= 2004 CONCACAF Men's Pre-Olympic Tournament =

North American football tournament

Tournament details
- Host country: Mexico
- Dates: 2–12 February
- Teams: 8 (from 1 confederation)
- Venue: 2 (in 2 host cities)

Final positions
- Champions: Mexico (5th title)
- Runners-up: Costa Rica
- Third place: Honduras
- Fourth place: United States

Tournament statistics
- Matches played: 16
- Goals scored: 53 (3.31 per match)
- Top scorer(s): (Honduras) Emil Martínez (United States) Bobby Convey (United States) Alecko Eskandarian (4 goals each)

The 2004 CONCACAF Men's Pre-Olympic Tournament was the eleventh edition of the CONCACAF Pre-Olympic Tournament, the quadrennial, international, age-restricted football tournament organised by CONCACAF to determine which men's under-23 national teams from the North, Central America and Caribbean region qualify for the Olympic football tournament. It was held in Mexico, from 2 and 12 February 2004.

Host nation, Mexico, won the title after a 1–0 win over Costa Rica in the final. As the top two teams, Mexico and Costa Rica both qualified for the 2004 Summer Olympics in Greece as the CONCACAF representatives.

== Qualification ==
=== Qualified teams ===
The following teams qualified for the final tournament.

Zone	Country	Method of qualification	Appearance^{1}	Last appearance	Previous best performance	Previous Olympic appearances (last)
North America	Mexico (hosts)	Automatic	8th	2000	Winners (1964, 1972, 1976, 1996)	8 (1996)
North America	Canada	Second round winners	5th	2000	Runners-up (1984, 1996)	3 (1984)
North America	United States	Second round winners	7th	2000	Winners (1988, 1992)	13 (2000)
Central America	Panama	Second round winners	3rd	2000	Fourth place (1964)	0
Central America	Honduras (title holders)	Second round winners	3rd	2000	Winners (2000, 2008)	1 (2000)
Central America	Costa Rica	Second round winners	5th	1996	Winners (1980, 1984)	2 (1984)
Caribbean	Jamaica	Second round winners	3rd	1996	Fourth place (1972, 1996)	0
Caribbean	Trinidad and Tobago	Second round winners	4th	1996	Runners-up (1968)	0

^{1} Only final tournament.

== Venues ==
Two cities served as the venues for tournament.

Guadalajara	2004 CONCACAF Men's Pre-Olympic Tournament is located in Mexico	Zapopan
Estadio Jalisco	2004 CONCACAF Men's Pre-Olympic Tournament is located in Mexico	Estadio Tres de Marzo
Capacity: 55,110	2004 CONCACAF Men's Pre-Olympic Tournament is located in Mexico	Capacity: 18,779

== Group stage ==
=== Group A ===
Pos	Team	Pld	W	D	L	GF	GA	GD	Pts	Qualification
1	United States	3	3	0	0	10	6	+4	9	Advance to knockout stage
2	Honduras	3	2	0	1	7	5	+2	6	Advance to knockout stage
3	Panama	3	1	0	2	6	8	−2	3	
4	Canada	3	0	0	3	1	5	−4	0	

Source: CONCACAF
3 February 2004

Canada	0–1	Honduras
		Martínez 57'

Estadio Tres de Marzo, Zapopan
Attendance: 2,500
Referee: Greivin Porras (CRC)
3 February 2004

Panama	3–4	United States
Garcés 52' 70'; Henríquez 56'		Convey 7' 80'; Davis 27'; Donovan 28'

Estadio Tres de Marzo, Zapopan
Attendance: 2,500
Referee: Gilberto Alcalá (MEX)

5 February 2004

Honduras	3–1	Panama
Martínez 12' 27'; Palacios 77'		Bernárdez 24' (o.g.)

Estadio Tres de Marzo, Zapopan
Attendance: 1,500
Referee: Grevivin Porras (CRC)
5 February 2004

Canada	0–2	United States
		Convey 30' 72'

Estadio Tres de Marzo, Zapopan
Attendance: 1,500
Referee: Neal Brizan (TRI)

7 February 2004

Canada	1–2	Panama
Friend 19'	Report	Garcés 12'; Miranda 74'

Estadio Tres de Marzo, Zapopan
Attendance: 1,000
Referee: Victor Stewart (JAM)
7 February 2004

Honduras	3–4	United States
Maradiaga 31' (pen.) 72' (pen.); Azrú 77'	Report	Eskandarian 27' 57' 69'; Beckerman 47'

Estadio Tres de Marzo, Zapopan
Attendance: 1,000
Referee: Gilberto Alcalá (MEX)

=== Group B ===
Pos	Team	Pld	W	D	L	GF	GA	GD	Pts	Qualification
1	Costa Rica	3	2	1	0	8	1	+7	7	Advance to knockout stage
2	Mexico (H)	3	2	1	0	8	2	+6	7	Advance to knockout stage
3	Trinidad and Tobago	3	1	0	2	3	8	−5	3	
4	Jamaica	3	0	0	3	1	9	−8	0	

Source: CONCACAF
(H) Hosts
2 February 2004

Costa Rica	3–0	Jamaica
Myrie 68' 73'; Araya 90'

Estadio Jalisco, Guadalajara
Attendance: 15,000
Referee: Neal Brizan (TRI)
2 February 2004

Mexico	3–1	Trinidad and Tobago
Rodríguez 44'; Pérez 60'; Cacho 90+4'		Mitchell 19'

Estadio Jalisco, Guadalajara
Attendance: 15,000
Referee: Victor Stewart (JAM)

4 February 2004

Costa Rica	4–0	Trinidad and Tobago
Saborío 29'; Scott 63' 69'; Parks 78'

Estadio Jalisco, Guadalajara
Attendance: 4,000
Referee: Alex Prus (USA)
4 February 2004

Mexico	4–0	Jamaica
Martínez 5' (pen.); Pérez 17'; García 24'; Márquez 90+2'

Estadio Jalisco, Guadalajara
Attendance: 19,000
Referee: Rodolfo Sibrián (SLV)

6 February 2004

Jamaica	1–2	Trinidad and Tobago
Kelly 72'	Report	Sealy 5'; Spann 86' (pen.)

Estadio Jalisco, Guadalajara
Attendance: 50,000
Referee: Alex Prus (USA)
6 February 2004

Mexico	1–1	Costa Rica
Pérez 12'	Report	Díaz 8'

Estadio Jalisco, Guadalajara
Attendance: 50,000
Referee: Rodolfo Sibrián (SLV)

== Knockout stage ==
All match times listed are CDT (UTC−5), as listed by CONCACAF.

=== Bracket ===
Semi-finals
10 February – Guadalajara
Costa Rica	2
Honduras	0
10 February – Guadalajara
United States	0
Mexico	4

Final
12 February – Guadalajara
Costa Rica	0
Mexico (a.e.t.)	1
Third place play-off
12 February – Guadalajara
United States	1 (3)
Honduras (p)	1 (4)

=== Semi-finals ===
The semi-final winners qualified for the 2004 Summer Olympics.

10 February 2004
17:30

Costa Rica	2–0	Honduras
López 21'; Saborío 77'	Report

Estadio Jalisco, Guadalajara
Attendance: 60,000
Referee: Gilberto Alcalá (Mexico)

10 February 2004
20:00

United States	0–4	Mexico
	Report	Márquez 26', 55'; Martínez 28'; Iñiguez 90+1'

Estadio Jalisco, Guadalajara
Attendance: 60,000
Referee: Neal Brizan (Trinidad and Tobago)

=== Third place play-off ===
12 February 2004
17:30

United States	1–1 (a.e.t.)	Honduras
Eskandarian 50'	Report	Martínez 75' (pen.)
Penalties
Eskandarian (penalty scored); Gaven (penalty scored); Johnson (penalty scored); Davis (penalty missed); Pause (penalty missed)	3–4	Solís (penalty scored); Castro (penalty scored); Maradiaga (penalty scored); Mendoza (penalty scored)

Estadio Jalisco, Guadalajara
Attendance: 1,500
Referee: Rodolfo Sibrián (Jamaica)

=== Final ===
12 February 2004
20:00

Costa Rica	0–1 (a.e.t.)	Mexico
	Report	Martínez 101'

Estadio Jalisco, Guadalajara
Attendance: 40,000
Referee: Victor Stewart (Jamaica)

== Statistics ==
=== Awards ===
The following awards were given at the conclusion of the tournament.

Best XI
Goalkeeper	Defenders	Midfielders	Forwards
(Costa Rica) Adrián De Lemos	(Mexico) Aarón Galindo (Mexico) Francisco Rodríguez (Costa Rica) Michael Umaña	(United States) Bobby Convey (Costa Rica) Jose López López (Mexico) Diego Martínez (Mexico) Luis Ernesto Pérez	(United States) Landon Donovan (Mexico) Rafael Márquez Lugo (Honduras) Emil Martínez

=== Final ranking ===
Pos	Team	Pld	W	D	L	GF	GA	GD	Pts	Final result
1st place, gold medalist(s)	Mexico (H)	5	4	1	0	13	2	+11	13	Winners
2nd place, silver medalist(s)	Costa Rica	5	3	1	1	10	2	+8	10	Runner-ups
3rd place, bronze medalist(s)	Honduras	5	2	1	2	8	8	0	7	Third place
4	United States	5	3	1	1	11	11	0	10	Fourth place
5	Panama	3	1	0	2	6	8	−2	3	Eliminated in group stage
6	Trinidad and Tobago	3	1	0	2	3	8	−5	3	Eliminated in group stage
7	Canada	3	0	0	3	1	5	−4	0	Eliminated in group stage
8	Jamaica	3	0	0	3	1	9	−8	0	Eliminated in group stage

(H) Hosts

== Qualified teams for Summer Olympics ==
The following two teams from CONCACAF qualified for the 2004 Summer Olympics.

Team	Qualified on	Previous appearances in Summer Olympics^{1}
Costa Rica	10 February 2004	2 (1904, 1984)
Mexico	10 February 2004	8 (1928, 1948, 1964, 1968, 1972, 1976, 1992, 1996)

^{1} Bold indicates champions for that year. Italic indicates hosts for that year.
