= 2004 CONCACAF Men's Pre-Olympic Tournament squads =

The 2004 CONCACAF Men's Pre-Olympic Tournament was an international football tournament that was held in Mexico from 2 to 10 February 2004. The eight national teams involved in the tournament were required to register a squad of twenty players, three of whom had to be goalkeepers.

The final lists were published by CONCACAF on 1 February 2004.

The age listed for each player is on 2 February 2004, the first day of the tournament. A flag is included for coaches who are of a different nationality than their own national team. Players marked in bold have been capped at full international level.

== Group A ==
=== Canada ===
Coach: Bruce Twanley

No.	Pos.	Player	Date of birth (age)	Caps	Goals	Club
1	GK	Andrew Olivieri	27 March 1981 (aged 22)			(Canadian Soccer Association) Montreal Impact
2	DF	Adam Braz	7 June 1981 (aged 22)			(Canadian Soccer Association) Montreal Impact
3	DF	Winston Marshall	26 February 1983 (aged 20)			(United States Soccer Federation) Wright State University
4	DF	Victor Oppong	4 September 1981 (aged 22)			(German Football Association) 1. FC Saarbrücken
5	DF	Chris Pozniak	10 January 1981 (aged 23)			(Swedish Football Association) Örebro
6	MF	Tam Nsaliwa	28 January 1982 (aged 22)			(German Football Association) Jahn Regensburg
7	MF	Chris Williams	1 June 1981 (aged 22)			(Canadian Soccer Association) Montreal Impact
8	MF	Rocco Placentino	25 February 1982 (aged 21)			(Italian Football Federation) Avellino
9	DF	Kevin Harmse	4 July 1984 (aged 19)			(Norwegian Football Federation) Tromsø
10	MF	Julian de Guzman	25 March 1981 (aged 22)			(German Football Association) Hannover 96
11	FW	Rob Friend	23 January 1981 (aged 23)			(Norwegian Football Federation) Moss
12	MF	David Masciantonio	17 December 1981 (aged 22)			(Italian Football Federation) Isola Liri
13	MF	Atiba Hutchinson	8 February 1983 (aged 20)			(Swedish Football Association) Östers
14	FW	Stephen Ademolu	20 November 1982 (aged 21)			(United States Soccer Federation) Cleveland State Vikings
15	MF	Joshua Simpson	15 May 1983 (aged 20)			(United States Soccer Federation) University of Portland
16	FW	Elliott Godfrey	22 February 1983 (aged 20)			(The Football Association) Watford
17	MF	Sita-Taty Matondo	28 December 1984 (aged 19)			(Canadian Soccer Association) Montreal Impact
18	DF	Justin Thompson	9 January 1981 (aged 23)			(The Football Association) Bury
19	MF	Mathieu Savaria	14 May 1981 (aged 22)			(United States Soccer Federation) Fairleigh Dickinson University
22	GK	Alim Karim	20 April 1983 (aged 20)			(United States Soccer Federation) Syracuse University

=== Honduras ===
Coach: Edwin Pavón

No.	Pos.	Player	Date of birth (age)	Caps	Goals	Club
1	GK	Donis Escober	3 February 1981 (aged 22)			(National Autonomous Federation of Football of Honduras) Olimpia
3	DF	Maynor Figueroa	2 May 1983 (aged 20)			(National Autonomous Federation of Football of Honduras) Olimpia
4	MF	Clifford Laign	20 September 1982 (aged 21)			No club
5	DF	Nery Medina	5 August 1982 (aged 21)			(National Autonomous Federation of Football of Honduras) Motagua
6	DF	Sergio Mendoza	23 May 1981 (aged 22)			(National Autonomous Federation of Football of Honduras) Real España
7	MF	Emil Martínez	17 September 1982 (aged 21)			(National Autonomous Federation of Football of Honduras) Marathón
8	DF	Wilson Palacios	19 July 1984 (aged 19)			(National Autonomous Federation of Football of Honduras) Olimpia
9	MF	Alex Andino	2 August 1982 (aged 21)			(National Autonomous Federation of Football of Honduras) Platense
10	MF	Walter Martínez	24 March 1982 (aged 21)			(National Autonomous Federation of Football of Honduras) Victoria
11	FW	Abidán Solís	10 July 1984 (aged 19)			(National Autonomous Federation of Football of Honduras) Motagua
12	GK	John Bodden	3 October 1981 (aged 22)			(National Autonomous Federation of Football of Honduras) Victoria
13	MF	Samir Arzú	19 March 1981 (aged 22)			(National Autonomous Federation of Football of Honduras) Real España
15	MF	Ronald Maradiaga	4 December 1982 (aged 21)			(National Autonomous Federation of Football of Honduras) Victoria
16	MF	Mauricio Castro	11 August 1981 (aged 22)			(National Autonomous Federation of Football of Honduras) Motagua
17	DF	Roy Posas	14 March 1984 (aged 19)			(National Autonomous Federation of Football of Honduras) Motagua
18	FW	Jeffrey Brooks	2 March 1981 (aged 22)			No club
19	DF	Mario Berríos	29 January 1982 (aged 22)			(National Autonomous Federation of Football of Honduras) Marathón
20	MF	Hendry Thomas	23 February 1985 (aged 18)			(National Autonomous Federation of Football of Honduras) Olimpia
21	FW	Jerry Palacios	13 May 1982 (aged 21)			(National Autonomous Federation of Football of Honduras) Olimpia
24	DF	Víctor Bernárdez	24 May 1982 (aged 21)			(National Autonomous Federation of Football of Honduras) Vida

=== Panama ===
Coach: (Colombia) José Hernández

No.	Pos.	Player	Date of birth (age)	Caps	Goals	Club
1	GK	Jaime Penedo	26 November 1981 (aged 22)			(Panamanian Football Federation) Arabe Unido
2	DF	Roberto Stewart	19 May 1981 (aged 22)			(Panamanian Football Federation) Plaza Amador
3	DF	Luis Moreno	19 March 1981 (aged 22)			(Panamanian Football Federation) Tauro
4	MF	Engie Mitre	16 October 1981 (aged 22)			(Panamanian Football Federation) Plaza Amador
5	DF	Felipe Baloy	24 February 1981 (aged 22)			(Brazilian Football Confederation) Grêmio
6	MF	Gustavo Avila	21 August 1981 (aged 22)			(Panamanian Football Federation) Tauro
7	MF	William Aguilar	8 May 1982 (aged 21)			(Panamanian Football Federation) Tauro
8	MF	Rolando Escobar	24 October 1981 (aged 22)			(Panamanian Football Federation) Chorrillo
9	FW	José Garcés	6 May 1981 (aged 22)			(Panamanian Football Federation) Arabe Unido
10	FW	Luis Tejada	28 March 1982 (aged 21)			(Panamanian Football Federation) Tauro
11	DF	Luis Henríquez	23 November 1981 (aged 22)			(Panamanian Football Federation) Arabe Unido
12	GK	Francisco Portillo	25 February 1981 (aged 22)			(Panamanian Football Federation) San Francisco
13	DF	Víctor Miranda	27 July 1982 (aged 21)			(Panamanian Football Federation) San Francisco
14	DF	Francisco López	3 July 1981 (aged 22)			(Panamanian Football Federation) Alianza
15	FW	José Justavino	2 December 1981 (aged 22)			(Argentine Football Association) Racing Club
16	FW	Blas Pérez	13 March 1981 (aged 22)			(Colombian Football Federation) Envigado
17	MF	Wess Torres	4 August 1981 (aged 22)			(Panamanian Football Federation) Chorrillo
18	DF	Leonel Parris	13 June 1982 (aged 21)			(Panamanian Football Federation) Plaza Amador
19	FW	Nicolás Muñoz	12 December 1981 (aged 22)			(Panamanian Football Federation) Chorrillo

=== United States ===
Coach: Glenn Myernick

No.	Pos.	Player	Date of birth (age)	Caps	Goals	Club
1	GK	Delvin Countess	9 January 1982 (aged 22)			(United States Soccer Federation) Dallas Burn
2	DF	Jose Burciaga	16 November 1981 (aged 22)			(United States Soccer Federation) Kansas City Wizards
3	DF	Ricky Lewis	29 May 1982 (aged 21)			(United States Soccer Federation) Los Angeles Galaxy
4	DF	David Stokes	28 May 1982 (aged 21)			(United States Soccer Federation) D.C. United
5	MF	Kyle Beckerman	3 April 1982 (aged 21)			(United States Soccer Federation) Colorado Rapids
6	DF	Nat Borchers	13 April 1981 (aged 22)			(United States Soccer Federation) Colorado Rapids
7	MF	DaMarcus Beasley	24 May 1982 (aged 21)			(United States Soccer Federation) Chicago Fire
8	MF	Logan Pause	22 August 1981 (aged 22)			(United States Soccer Federation) Chicago Fire
9	MF	Brad Davis	8 November 1981 (aged 22)			(United States Soccer Federation) Dallas Burn
10	FW	Landon Donovan	4 March 1982 (aged 21)			(United States Soccer Federation) San Jose Earthquakes
11	FW	Alecko Eskandarian	9 July 1982 (aged 21)			(United States Soccer Federation) D.C. United
12	MF	Brian Carroll	20 July 1981 (aged 22)			(United States Soccer Federation) D.C. United
13	DF	Zak Whitbread	10 January 1984 (aged 20)			(The Football Association) Liverpool
14	DF	Chad Marshall	22 August 1984 (aged 19)			(United States Soccer Federation) Columbus Crew
15	MF	Bobby Convey	27 May 1983 (aged 20)			(United States Soccer Federation) D.C. United
16	DF	Chris Wingert	16 June 1982 (aged 21)			(United States Soccer Federation) Columbus Crew
17	MF	Eddie Gaven	25 October 1986 (aged 17)			(United States Soccer Federation) NY MetroStars
18	GK	Doug Warren	18 March 1981 (aged 22)			(United States Soccer Federation) D.C. United
19	FW	David Testo	7 August 1981 (aged 22)			(United States Soccer Federation) Richmond Kickers
20	FW	Edward Johnson	31 March 1984 (aged 19)			(United States Soccer Federation) Dallas Burn

== Group B ==
=== Costa Rica ===
Coach: Rodrigo Kenton

No.	Pos.	Player	Date of birth (age)	Caps	Goals	Club
1	GK	Adrián De Lemos	13 October 1982 (aged 21)			(Costa Rican Football Federation) Herediano
2	DF	Michael Rodríguez	30 December 1981 (aged 22)			(Costa Rican Football Federation) Alajuelense
3	DF	Pablo Salazar	21 November 1982 (aged 21)			(Costa Rican Football Federation) Cartaginés
5	DF	Michael Umaña	16 July 1982 (aged 21)			(Costa Rican Football Federation) Herediano
7	FW	Erick Scott	29 May 1981 (aged 22)			(Costa Rican Football Federation) Alajuelense
8	MF	José López	31 March 1981 (aged 22)			(Costa Rican Football Federation) Saprissa
9	MF	Pablo Brenes	4 August 1982 (aged 21)			(Costa Rican Football Federation) Pérez Zeledón
10	MF	Warren Granados	6 December 1981 (aged 22)			(Costa Rican Football Federation) Alajuelense
12	MF	Leonardo Araya	15 December 1982 (aged 21)			(Costa Rican Football Federation) Santos
13	MF	Luis Vallejos	27 May 1981 (aged 22)			(Costa Rican Football Federation) Herediano
14	DF	José Villalobos	5 June 1981 (aged 22)			(Costa Rican Football Federation) Cartaginés
15	DF	Júnior Díaz	12 September 1983 (aged 20)			(Costa Rican Football Federation) Herediano
16	MF	Carlos Hernández	9 April 1982 (aged 21)			(Costa Rican Football Federation) Alajuelense
17	FW	Berny Scott	4 August 1982 (aged 21)			(National Football Federation of Guatemala) Comunicaciones
18	GK	Víctor Bolívar	23 July 1981 (aged 22)			(Costa Rican Football Federation) Municipal Liberia
19	FW	Álvaro Saborío	25 March 1982 (aged 21)			(Costa Rican Football Federation) Saprissa
20	DF	Roy Myrie	21 August 1982 (aged 21)			(Costa Rican Football Federation) Alajuelense
21	FW	Winston Parks	12 October 1981 (aged 22)			(Russian Football Union) Lokomotiv Moscow
22	FW	Jairo Arrieta	25 August 1983 (aged 20)			(Costa Rican Football Federation) Guanacasteca
23	GK	Neighel Drummond	2 February 1982 (aged 22)			(Costa Rican Football Federation) Alajuelense

=== Jamaica ===
Coach: Peter Cargill

No.	Pos.	Player	Date of birth (age)	Caps	Goals	Club
1	GK	Richard McCallum	24 April 1984 (aged 19)			(Jamaica Football Federation) Invaders United
3	DF	Shavar Thomas	29 January 1981 (aged 23)			(United States Soccer Federation) Dallas Burn
4	DF	Tyrone Sawyers	22 May 1981 (aged 22)			(Jamaica Football Federation) Portmore United
5	DF	Bradley Thomas	29 March 1984 (aged 19)			No club
6	DF	Wayne Ellis	13 November 1981 (aged 22)			(Jamaica Football Federation) Arnett Gardens
7	MF	Demar Phillips	23 August 1983 (aged 20)			(Jamaica Football Federation) Waterhouse
8	MF	Keith Kelly	5 March 1983 (aged 20)			(Jamaica Football Federation) Arnett Gardens
10	FW	Roland Dean	13 October 1981 (aged 22)			(Jamaica Football Federation) Tivoli Gardens
11	MF	Damion Williams	26 February 1981 (aged 22)			(Jamaica Football Federation) Seba United
14	DF	Desmond Breakenridge	30 January 1981 (aged 23)			(Jamaica Football Federation) Waterhouse
15	MF	Simeon Howell	26 August 1985 (aged 18)			(The Football Association) Reading
16	DF	Christopher Harvey	9 October 1982 (aged 21)			(Jamaica Football Federation) Harbour View
18	FW	Christopher Nicholas	16 January 1981 (aged 23)			(Jamaica Football Federation) Tivoli Gardens
19	DF	Garfield Reid	14 January 1981 (aged 23)			(Jamaica Football Federation) Rivoli United
20	MF	Omar Daley	25 April 1981 (aged 22)			(The Football Association) Reading
24	FW	Nicholas Addlery	9 September 1983 (aged 20)			(Trinidad and Tobago Football Association) South Starworld Strikers
30	GK	Maurice Evans	31 March 1983 (aged 20)			(Jamaica Football Federation) Portmore United
31	MF	Khari Stephenson	1 January 1981 (aged 23)			(Jamaica Football Federation) Real Mona

=== Mexico ===
Coach: (Argentina) Ricardo La Volpe

No.	Pos.	Player	Date of birth (age)	Club
1	GK	José de Jesús Corona	26 July 1981 (aged 22)	(Mexican Football Federation) Atlas
12	GK	Cirilo Saucedo	5 January 1981 (aged 23)	(Mexican Football Federation) León
2	DF	Omar Monjaraz	11 May 1981 (aged 22)	(Mexican Football Federation) Jaguares
3	DF	Mario Pérez	17 June 1982 (aged 21)	(Mexican Football Federation) Necaxa
4	DF	Aarón Galindo	8 May 1982 (aged 21)	(Mexican Football Federation) Cruz Azul
6	DF	Ismael Rodríguez	10 January 1981 (aged 23)	(Mexican Football Federation) Monterrey
7	DF	Gonzalo Pineda	19 October 1982 (aged 21)	(Mexican Football Federation) Pumas
8	DF	Diego Martínez	15 February 1981 (aged 22)	(Mexican Football Federation) Necaxa
14	DF	Francisco Javier Rodríguez	10 October 1981 (aged 22)	(Mexican Football Federation) Guadalajara
19	DF	Jaime Durán	2 December 1981 (aged 22)	(Mexican Football Federation) Atlas
20	DF	Hugo Sánchez Guerrero	8 May 1981 (aged 22)	(Mexican Football Federation) Tigres
18	MF	Ismael Íñiguez	23 July 1981 (aged 22)	(Mexican Football Federation) Pumas
21	MF	Rodolfo Espinoza	14 June 1981 (aged 22)	(Mexican Football Federation) Necaxa
23	MF	Luis Ernesto Pérez	12 January 1981 (aged 23)	(Mexican Football Federation) Monterrey
5	FW	Gerardo Espinoza	3 October 1981 (aged 22)	(Mexican Football Federation) Atlas
9	FW	Juan Carlos Cacho	3 May 1982 (aged 21)	(Mexican Football Federation) Monterrey
10	FW	Juan Pablo García	24 November 1981 (aged 22)	(Mexican Football Federation) Atlas
11	FW	Rafael Márquez Lugo	2 November 1981 (aged 22)	(Mexican Football Federation) Morelia
15	FW	Sergio Amaury Ponce	13 August 1981 (aged 22)	(Mexican Football Federation) Toluca
17	FW	Luis Alonso Sandoval	27 September 1981 (aged 22)	(Mexican Football Federation) Guadalajara

=== Trinidad and Tobago ===
Coach: (Curaçao) Stuart Charles-Fevrier
