= 1996 CONCACAF Pre-Olympic Tournament =

North American football tournament

Tournament details
- Host country: Canada
- Dates: 10–19 May
- Teams: 6 (from 1 confederation)
- Venue: 1 (in 1 host city)

Final positions
- Champions: Mexico (4th title)
- Runners-up: Canada

Tournament statistics
- Matches played: 15
- Goals scored: 48 (3.2 per match)
- Top scorer: (Costa Rica) Rónald Gómez (4 goals)

The 1996 CONCACAF Pre-Olympic Tournament was the ninth edition of the CONCACAF Pre-Olympic Tournament, the quadrennial, international, age-restricted association football tournament organized by CONCACAF to determine which men's under-23 national teams from the North, Central America and Caribbean region qualify for the Olympic football tournament. It was held in Canada, from 10 and 19 May 1996.

It was the first time in which teams that qualified for the Olympics were permitted to supplement their rosters with three players not restricted by age in its 18-man final list.

Mexico, as winners qualified for the 1996 Summer Olympics together with the United States who automatically qualified as hosts. Second-placed Canada later lost to Australia in the CONCACAF–OFC play-off and failed to qualify for the Olympics for the third consecutive time.

== Qualification ==
=== Qualified teams ===
The following teams qualified for the final tournament.

Zone	Country	Method of qualification	Appearance^{1}	Last appearance	Previous best performance	Previous Olympic appearances (last)
North America	Canada (hosts)	Automatic	3rd	1992	Runners-up (1984)	1
North America	Mexico	First round winner	6th	1992	Winners (1964, 1972, 1976)	7
Central America	Costa Rica	First round winner	4th	1984	Winners (1980, 1984)	2
Central America	El Salvador	First round winner	3rd	1988	Winners (1968)	1
Caribbean	Jamaica	First round winner	2nd	1972	Fourth place (1972)	0
Caribbean	Trinidad and Tobago	First round winner	3rd	1988	Runners-up (1968)	0

^{1} Only final tournament.

== Venues ==
The matches were played in Edmonton.

Edmonton		1996 CONCACAF Pre-Olympic Tournament is located in Canada
Commonwealth Stadium	Clarke Stadium	1996 CONCACAF Pre-Olympic Tournament is located in Canada
Capacity: 60,081	Capacity: 20,000	1996 CONCACAF Pre-Olympic Tournament is located in Canada

== Final round ==
Pos	Team	Pld	W	D	L	GF	GA	GD	Pts	Qualification
1	Mexico (C)	5	5	0	0	12	1	+11	15	Qualification to 1996 Summer Olympics
2	Canada (H)	5	2	2	1	7	3	+4	8	Advance to play-offs
3	Costa Rica	5	2	1	2	9	9	0	7	
4	Jamaica	5	2	0	3	7	11	−4	6	
5	Trinidad and Tobago	5	1	1	3	6	10	−4	4	
6	El Salvador	5	1	0	4	7	14	−7	3	

Source: RSSSF
(C) Champions; (H) Hosts
10 May 1996

Canada	3–0	Jamaica
	Report

Commonwealth Stadium, Edmonton
Attendance: 7,029
Referee: Zimmermann Boulos (United States)
11 May 1996

Mexico	3–0	El Salvador
	Report

Commonwealth Stadium, Edmonton
Attendance: 4,112
Referee: Nelson Rutilio Cálix Turcios (Honduras)
11 May 1996

Costa Rica	4–1	Trinidad and Tobago
	Report

Commonwealth Stadium, Edmonton
Attendance: 4,112
Referee: Brian Hall (United States)

13 May 1996

El Salvador	3–1	Jamaica
	Report

Clarke Stadium, Edmonton
Attendance: 4,952
Referee: Brian Hall (United States)
13 May 1996

Canada	0–0	Trinidad and Tobago

Commonwealth Stadium, Edmonton
Attendance: 4,952
Referee: Vanroy Burnes
13 May 1996

Mexico	4–0	Costa Rica

Commonwealth Stadium, Edmonton
Attendance: 4,952
Referee: Mario Efrain Escobar López

15 May 1996

Jamaica	2–1	Costa Rica
	Report

Clarke Stadium, Edmonton
15 May 1996

Canada	4–2	El Salvador
	Report

Commonwealth Stadium, Edmonton
Referee: Nelson Rutilio Cálix Turcios (Honduras)
15 May 1996

Mexico	2–0	Trinidad and Tobago
	Report

Commonwealth Stadium, Edmonton
Referee: Zimmermann Boulos (United States)

17 May 1996

Trinidad and Tobago	2–1	El Salvador
	Report

Clarke Stadium, Edmonton
Referee: Brian Hall (United States)
17 May 1996

Canada	0–0	Costa Rica

Commonwealth Stadium, Edmonton
17 May 1996

Mexico	2–1	Jamaica
	Report

Commonwealth Stadium, Edmonton

19 May 1996

Jamaica	3–2	Trinidad and Tobago
	Report

Clarke Stadium, Edmonton
19 May 1996

Costa Rica	4–1	El Salvador
	Report

Clarke Stadium, Edmonton
19 May 1996

Canada	0–1	Mexico
	Report

Commonwealth Stadium, Edmonton
Attendance: 19,401
Referee: Mario Efrain Escobar López (Guatemala)

== Statistics ==
=== Goalscorers ===
There were 48 goals scored in 15 matches, for an average of 3.2 goals per match.

6 goals

- (Costa Rica) Rónald Gómez

4 goals

- (Mexico) Cuauhtémoc Blanco
- (Jamaica) Onandi Lowe

3 goals

- (Mexico) José Manuel Abundis
- (Mexico) Jesús Arellano

== Qualified teams for Summer Olympics ==
The following two teams from CONCACAF qualified for the 1996 Summer Olympics, including the United States which qualified as hosts.

Team	Qualified on	Previous appearances in Summer Olympics^{1}
United States	18 September 1990	11 (1904, 1924, 1928, 1936, 1948, 1952, 1956, 1972, 1984, 1988, 1992)
Mexico	17 May 1996	7 (1928, 1948, 1964, 1968, 1972, 1976, 1992)

^{1} Bold indicates champions for that year. Italic indicates hosts for that year.
