= United States men's national under-23 soccer team =

National under-23 soccer team

United States Olympic
- Nickname(s): Team USA; The Stars and Stripes; The Yanks
- Association: United States Soccer Federation
- Confederation: CONCACAF
- Head coach: Steve Cherundolo
- Captain: Tanner Tessmann
| First colors | Second colors |

First international
- United States 1–2 Italy (Barcelona, Spain; July 24, 1992)

Biggest win
- United States 6–0 Cuba (Nashville, United States; March 22, 2012)

Biggest defeat
- Mexico 4–0 United States (Guadalajara, Mexico; February 10, 2004); Morocco 4–0 United States (Paris, France; August 2, 2024) Records for competitive matches only

Olympic Games
- Appearances: 5 (first in 1992)
- Best result: Fourth place (2000)

Pan American Games
- Appearances: 1 (first in 1999)
- Best result: Bronze (1999)
Medal record
Pan American Games
| Bronze medal – third place | 1999 Winnipeg | Team |

The United States U-23 men's national soccer team, also known as the United States men's Olympic soccer team, is a youth soccer team operated under the auspices of U.S. Soccer. Its primary role is qualification into and competition at the quadrennial Olympic Football Tournament, with the next one to be held during the 2028 Summer Olympics in Los Angeles, which the team has already qualified for as hosts.

Its most recent major tournament was the 2024 edition at the Paris Olympics, in which the team made it to the quarter-finals before being eliminated by Morocco.

In accordance with FIFA regulations, the roster can be augmented with three "overage" players during Olympic competition.

== History ==
Men's Olympic soccer became an under-23 competition for the 1992 Summer Olympics in Barcelona, Spain. In the group stage, the Americans defeated Kuwait but lost to Italy and only managed a draw with Poland. As a result, they were eliminated in the first round. Several U.S. players on the roster, however, would go on to have a major influence with the United States men's national soccer team in the 1994 FIFA World Cup, which the United States would host.

The 1996 Summer Olympics in Atlanta, Georgia would be the first time that teams could add overage players to their rosters. Being the host nation and with Major League Soccer in the middle of its inaugural season, the USSF tapped then-D.C. United head coach Bruce Arena to manage the Olympic team. They would fall short again, however, as a loss to eventual-silver medalists Argentina offset a win against Tunisia and a draw with Portugal.

The 2000 Summer Olympics in Sydney, Australia marked a significant turnaround in the fortunes of the team. This time, the United States, led by head coach Clive Charles, won their group on goal difference on the strength of draws with the Czech Republic and eventual-gold medalists Cameroon and a win over Kuwait. A tense quarterfinal match against Japan ended in a penalty shoot-out which the United States won. Losses to Spain in the semifinals and Chile in the bronze medal match left the Americans short of medal dreams, but the fourth-place finish in a sixteen-team tournament was the program's greatest youth team.

The team did not compete at the 2004 Summer Olympics in Athens, Greece; the United States, led by head coach Glenn Myernick, failed to qualify after a defeat to Mexico in the semifinals of the 2004 CONCACAF Men's Pre-Olympic Tournament.

In late 2006, former Chivas USA head coach Bob Bradley was given the reins to both the senior national team and under-23 national team. His tenure would be brief as his elevation to full-time head coach of the senior team would result in him handing control of the under-23 team to his assistant head coach, Piotr Nowak. Under Nowak, the United States qualified for the 2008 Summer Olympics after a 3–0 win over Canada in the 2008 CONCACAF Men's Pre-Olympic Tournament, thanks to goals by Freddy Adu and Sacha Kljestan. The Olympics began promisingly; the Americans defeated Japan and led Holland late. However, a stoppage time goal equalized for the Dutch, and the Americans followed up with a loss to Nigeria.

Under the leadership of new coach Caleb Porter in the 2012 CONCACAF Men's Olympic Qualifying Tournament, the Americans defeated Cuba but were then beaten by Canada and surrendered a late lead against El Salvador, causing them to miss the Olympics for the second time in three tournaments.

During the 2024 Summer Olympics, the team made it to the quarterfinals of the tournament for the first time since 2000, after they beat Guinea 3–0. They would be eliminated in their next match by Morocco.

== Coaches ==
- 1988–1992: Lothar Osiander
- 1994–1995: Timo Liekoski
- 1995–1996: Bruce Arena
- 1996–2003: Clive Charles
- 2003–2004: Glenn Myernick
- 2006–2007: Bob Bradley
- 2007–2009: Piotr Nowak
- 2011–2012: Caleb Porter
- 2013–2014: Tab Ramos
- 2015–2016: Andreas Herzog
- 2019–2021: Jason Kreis
- 2023–2025: Marko Mitrović
- 2026: Russell Payne (interim)
- 2026–present: Steve Cherundolo

== Recent schedule and results ==
The following is a list of match results in the last 12 months, as well as any future matches that have been scheduled.

Win Draw Loss Fixture

=== 2025 ===
| November 14 Friendly | Denmark | 1–1 | United States | Vejle, Denmark |
| | | Report | Hopkins 23' | Stadium: Vejle Stadium |

| November 18 Friendly | Serbia | 1–0 | United States | Bačka Topola, Serbia |
| | | | | Stadium: TSC Arena |

=== 2026 ===
| March 27 Friendly | Japan | 0–2 | United States | Cheonan, South Korea |
| 2:00 am EDT | | Report | Yapi; Downs | Stadium: Korea Football Park |

| March 31 Friendly | South Korea | 1–4 | United States | Cheonan, South Korea |
| | | Report | Baker-Whiting, Brennan; Castañeda | Stadium: Korea Football Park |

| June 5 Friendly | Ukraine | 1–3 | United States | Rogaška Slatina, Slovenia |
| | Husol 19' | Report | Brennan 28'; Downs 43'; Campbell 57' | Stadium: Nogometno igrišče Stadium; Attendance: 0 Referee: Armin Avdihodžić |

| June 9 Friendly | Uzbekistan | 1–0 | United States | Rogaška Slatina, Slovenia |
| | | Report | | Stadium: Nogometno igrišče Stadium |

== Current squad ==
The following 24 players were called up for friendly matches against Scotland on November 15, 2026 and against Ukraine on November 17, 2026.

Caps and goals correct as of November 18, 2025, after the match against Serbia.

| No. | Pos. | Player | Date of birth (age) | Caps | Goals | Club |
|---|---|---|---|---|---|---|
| | GK | Julian Eyestone | April 21, 2006 (age 20) | 0 | 0 | (The Football Association) Brentford |
| | GK | Duran Ferree | September 28, 2006 (age 20) | 1 | 0 | (United States Soccer Federation) San Diego FC |
| | GK | Andrew Rick | January 30, 2006 (age 20) | 0 | 0 | (United States Soccer Federation) Philadelphia Union |
| | DF | Luca Bombino | July 10, 2006 (age 20) | 0 | 0 | (The Football Association) Stoke City |
| | DF | Robert Deziel Jr. | June 30, 2005 (age 21) | 0 | 0 | (Polish Football Association) Legia Warsaw |
| | DF | Tate Johnson | July 10, 2005 (age 21) | 0 | 0 | (Canadian Soccer Association) Vancouver Whitecaps |
| | DF | Ethan Kohler | May 20, 2005 (age 21) | 2 | 0 | (United States Soccer Federation) New England Revolution |
| | DF | Drew Murray | October 27, 2005 (age 21) | 0 | 0 | (Austrian Football Association) WSG Tirol |
| | DF | Nolan Norris | February 17, 2005 (age 21) | 2 | 0 | (United States Soccer Federation) Dallas |
| | DF | Frankie Westfield | December 9, 2005 (age 20) | 0 | 0 | (United States Soccer Federation) Philadelphia Union |
| | DF | Joshua Wynder | May 2, 2005 (age 21) | 0 | 0 | (United States Soccer Federation) New England Revolution |
| | MF | Snyder Brunell | March 27, 2007 (age 19) | 0 | 0 | (United States Soccer Federation) Seattle Sounders |
| | MF | Matthew Corcoran | February 17, 2006 (age 20) | 0 | 0 | (United States Soccer Federation) Nashville |
| | MF | Benjamin Cremaschi | March 2, 2005 (age 21) | 7 | 1 | (Italian Football Federation) Parma |
| | MF | Taha Habroune | February 5, 2006 (age 20) | 0 | 0 | (United States Soccer Federation) Columbus Crew |
| | MF | Brooklyn Raines | March 11, 2005 (age 21) | 2 | 0 | (United States Soccer Federation) New England Revolution |
| | MF | Niko Tsakiris | June 19, 2005 (age 21) | 2 | 0 | (United States Soccer Federation) San Jose Earthquakes |
| | FW | Cole Campbell | February 20, 2006 (age 20) | 2 | 0 | (German Football Association) SV Elversberg |
| | FW | Damion Downs | July 6, 2004 (age 22) | 1 | 0 | (German Football Association) Hamburger SV |
| | FW | Sebastian Gomez | May 21, 2006 (age 20) | 0 | 0 | (United States Soccer Federation) Seattle Sounders |
| | FW | Andre Gitau | November 26, 2006 (age 19) | 0 | 0 | (German Football Association) Mainz |
| | FW | Marvin Dills | April 25, 2007 (age 19) | 0 | 0 | (German Football Association) Eintracht Frankfurt |
| | FW | David Vazquez | February 22, 2006 (age 20) | 0 | 0 | (United States Soccer Federation) San Diego FC |

=== Recent call-ups ===
The following players have been called up for the team within the last 12 months.

- March 2026 friendlies.
- November 2025 friendlies.

| Pos. | Player | Date of birth (age) | Caps | Goals | Club | Latest call-up |
|---|---|---|---|---|---|---|
| GK | Gabriel Slonina | May 15, 2004 (age 22) | 1 | 0 | (England) Chelsea | March 2026 friendlies |
| GK | Diego Kochen | March 19, 2006 (age 20) | 1 | 0 | (Spain) Barcelona | March 2026 friendlies |
| DF | Reed Baker-Whiting | March 31, 2005 (age 21) | 1 | 0 | (United States) Nashville | June 2026 friendlies |
| DF | Thomas Williams | August 15, 2004 (age 22) | 1 | 0 | (United States) Nashville | June 2026 friendlies |
| DF | Peyton Miller | November 8, 2007 (age 19) | 1 | 0 | (United States) New England Revolution | June 2026 friendlies |
| DF | Justin Reynolds | August 4, 2004 (age 22) | 0 | 0 | (United States) Sporting Kansas City | June 2026 friendlies |
| DF | Noah Cobb | July 20, 2005 (age 21) | 1 | 0 | (United States) Colorado Rapids | March 2026 friendlies |
| DF | Brandan Craig | April 7, 2004 (age 22) | 3 | 0 | (Canada) Montréal | November 2025 friendlies |
| MF | Rokas Pukštas | August 25, 2004 (age 22) | 1 | 0 | (England) Middlesbrough | June 2026 friendlies |
| MF | Santiago Castañeda | November 13, 2004 (age 22) | 1 | 0 | (Germany) Paderborn 07 | June 2026 friendlies |
| MF | Jackson Hopkins | July 1, 2004 (age 22) | 2 | 1 | (United States) DC United | June 2026 friendlies |
| MF | Sergio Oregel | May 16, 2005 (age 21) | 0 | 0 | (United States) Chicago Fire | June 2026 friendlies |
| MF | Gerardo Valenzuela | September 28, 2004 (age 22) | 1 | 0 | (United States) Cincinnati | March 2026 friendlies |
| MF | MyKhi Joyner | August 30, 2006 (age 20) | 1 | 0 | (United States) St. Louis City | November 2025 friendlies |
| FW | Luke Brennan | February 24, 2005 (age 21) | 0 | 0 | (United States) Atlanta United | June 2026 friendlies |
| FW | Zach Booth | February 17, 2004 (age 22) | 0 | 0 | (United States) Real Salt Lake | June 2026 friendlies |
| FW | Alan Carleton | March 20, 2005 (age 21) | 0 | 0 | (Sweden) Sandvikens | June 2026 friendlies |
| FW | Korede Osundina | February 13, 2004 (age 22) | 0 | 0 | (Portugal) Casa Pia | June 2026 friendlies |
| FW | Darren Yapi | November 19, 2004 (age 22) | 2 | 0 | (United States) Colorado Rapids | March 2026 friendlies |
| FW | Brandon Powell | October 17, 2005 (age 21) | 0 | 0 | (England) Barrow | March 2026 friendlies |
| FW | Zavier Gozo | March 22, 2007 (age 19) | 2 | 0 | (England) Crystal Palace | November 2025 friendlies |

Notes:

- INJ: Withdrew due to injury

=== Overage players in Olympic Games ===
| Tournament | Player 1 | Player 2 | Player 3 |
|---|---|---|---|
| 1996 | Kasey Keller (GK) | Alexi Lalas (DF) | did not select |
| 2000 | Brad Friedel (GK) | Jeff Agoos (DF) | Frankie Hejduk (MF) |
| 2008 | Brad Guzan (GK) | Michael Parkhurst (DF) | Brian McBride (FW) |
| 2024 | Walker Zimmerman (DF) | Miles Robinson (DF) | Djordje Mihailovic (MF) |

== Honors ==
- CONCACAF Olympic Qualifying Tournament
  - Winners (1): 1992
  - Runners-up (2): 2000, 2008
  - Third place (1): 2015
- Pan American Games
  - Gold medalists (1): 1991

== Top goalscorers ==
| Rank | Player | Year(s) | U-23 Goals |
|---|---|---|---|
| 1 | Steve Snow | 1992 | 10 |
| 2 | Landon Donovan | 2000–2004 | 9 |
| 3 | Jordan Morris | 2014–2016 | 7 |
| 4 | Jerome Kiesewetter | 2011–2015 | 6 |
| 4 | Brent Goulet | 1988 | 6 |
| 6 | Freddy Adu | 2008–2012 | 5 |
| 7 | Joe Corona | 2012 | 4 |
| 7 | Luis Gil | 2011–2016 | 4 |
| 7 | Bobby Convey | 2004 | 4 |
| 7 | Sacha Kljestan | 2007–2008 | 4 |
| 7 | Alecko Eskandarian | 2002–2004 | 4 |
| 7 | Chris Albright | 2000 | 4 |
| 7 | Mike Seerey | 1972 | 4 |
| 7 | Carl Gentile | 1964 | 4 |

== Competitive record ==
=== Olympic Games ===
| Summer Olympics record | | | | | | | | | | Qualification record | | | | | | Manager |
| Year | Result | Pos | Pld | W | D | L | GF | GA | Squad | Pld | W | D | L | GF | GA | Manager |
|---|---|---|---|---|---|---|---|---|---|---|---|---|---|---|---|---|
| Through 1988 | See United States men's national soccer team | | | | | | | | | 1988 Pre-Olympic Tournament | | | | | | Osiander |
| (Spain) 1992 | Group stage | 9th | 3 | 1 | 1 | 1 | 6 | 5 | Squad | 6 | 5 | 0 | 1 | 17 | 10 | Osiander |
| (United States) 1996 | Group stage | 10th | 3 | 1 | 1 | 1 | 4 | 4 | Squad | Qualified as hosts | | | | | | Arena |
| (Australia) 2000 | Fourth place | 4th | 6 | 1 | 3 | 2 | 9 | 11 | Squad | 4 | 2 | 1 | 1 | 8 | 2 | Charles |
| (Greece) 2004 | Did not qualify | | | | | | | | | 5 | 3 | 1 | 1 | 11 | 7 | Myernick |
| (China) 2008 | Group stage | 9th | 3 | 1 | 1 | 1 | 4 | 4 | Squad | 5 | 3 | 1 | 1 | 6 | 1 | Nowak |
| (United Kingdom) 2012 | Did not qualify | | | | | | | | | 3 | 1 | 1 | 1 | 9 | 5 | Porter |
| (Brazil) 2016 | Did not qualify | | | | | | | | | 5 | 4 | 0 | 1 | 15 | 4 | Herzog |
| (Japan) 2020 | Did not qualify | | | | | | | | | 4 | 2 | 0 | 2 | 6 | 3 | Kreis |
| (France) 2024 | Quarter-finals | 8th | 4 | 2 | 0 | 2 | 7 | 8 | Squad | 7 | 6 | 1 | 0 | 31 | 2 | Mitrović |
| (United States) 2028 | Qualified as hosts | | | | | | | | | Qualified as hosts | | | | | | TBD |
| (Australia) 2032 | To be determined | | | | | | | | | To be determined | | | | | | TBD |
| Total | Fourth place | 4th | 19 | 6 | 6 | 7 | 30 | 32 | 6/11 | 39 | 23 | 5 | 8 | 103 | 34 | — |

Summer Olympics history
| First Match | Italy 2–1 United States (July 24, 1992; Barcelona, Spain) |
| Biggest Win | United States 4–1 New Zealand (July 27, 2024; Marseille, France); United States 3–0 Guinea (July 30, 2024; Saint-Étienne, France) |
| Biggest Defeat | Morocco 4–0 United States (August 2, 2024; Paris, France) |
| Best Result | Fourth place in 2000 |
| Worst Result | Tenth place in 1996 |

=== Pan American Games ===
| Pan American Games record | | | | | | | | | | Qualification Record | | | | | | Manager |
| Year | Result | Pos | Pld | W | D | L | F | A | Squad | Pld | W | D | L | F | A | Manager |
|---|---|---|---|---|---|---|---|---|---|---|---|---|---|---|---|---|
| Through 1995 | See United States men's national under-20 soccer team | | | | | | | | | Qualified automatically | | | | | | Liekoski |
| (Canada) 1999 | Bronze medal | 3rd | 6 | 3 | 1 | 2 | 6 | 8 | Squad | Qualified automatically | | | | | | Charles |
| (Dominican Republic) 2003 | Did not enter | | | | | | | | | Did not enter | | | | | | Myernick |
| (Brazil) 2007 | See United States men's national under-18 soccer team | | | | | | | | | Qualified automatically | | | | | | Bradley |
| (Mexico) 2011 | Did not enter | | | | | | | | | Did not enter | | | | | | Porter |
| (Canada) 2015 | Did not enter | | | | | | | | | Did not enter | | | | | | Herzog |
| (Peru) 2019 | Did not enter | | | | | | | | | Did not enter | | | | | | Kreis |
| (Chile) 2023 | See United States men's national under-19 soccer team | | | | | | | | | 2022 U-20 Championship | | | | | | Mitrović |
| (Peru) 2027 | Qualifed | | | | | | | | | 2026 CONCACAF U-20 Championship | | | | | | TBD |
| Total | — | — | 6 | 3 | 1 | 2 | 6 | 8 | — | — | — | — | — | — | — | — |

Pan American Games history
| First Match | United States 1–0 Cuba (July 23, 1999; Winnipeg, Canada) |
| Biggest Win | United States 1–0 Cuba (July 23, 1999; Winnipeg, Canada); United States 2–1 Jamaica (July 27, 1999; Winnipeg, Canada); United States 2–1 Canada (August 6, 1999; Winnipeg, Canada) |
| Biggest Defeat | Mexico 4–0 United States (August 4, 1999; Winnipeg, Canada) |
| Best Result | Bronze medal in 1999 |
| Worst Result | Bronze medal in 1999 |

=== Pre-Olympic Tournament ===
| Olympic Qualifying Championship results | | | | | | | | | | Qualification | | | | | | Manager |
| Year | Result | Pos | Pld | W | D | L | GF | GA | Squad | Pld | W | D | L | GF | GA | Manager |
|---|---|---|---|---|---|---|---|---|---|---|---|---|---|---|---|---|
| Through 1988 | See United States men's national soccer team | | | | | | | | | See United States men's national soccer team | | | | | | Osiander |
| 1992 | Champions | 1st | 6 | 5 | 0 | 1 | 17 | 10 | Squad | 4 | 3 | 1 | 0 | 18 | 2 | Osiander |
| (Canada) 1996 | Qualified as hosts | | | | | | | | | No qualification | | | | | | Arena |
| (United States) 2000 | Runners-up | 2nd | 4 | 2 | 1 | 1 | 8 | 2 | Squad | Qualified automatically | | | | | | Charles |
| (Mexico) 2004 | Fourth place | 4th | 5 | 3 | 1 | 1 | 11 | 11 | Squad | 2 | 2 | 0 | 0 | 10 | 0 | Myernick |
| (United States) 2008 | Runners-up | 2nd | 5 | 3 | 1 | 1 | 6 | 2 | Squad | Qualified automatically | | | | | | Nowak |
| (United States) 2012 | Group stage | 5th | 3 | 1 | 1 | 1 | 9 | 5 | Squad | Qualified automatically | | | | | | Porter |
| (United States) 2015 | Third place | 3rd | 5 | 4 | 0 | 1 | 15 | 4 | Squad | Qualified automatically | | | | | | Herzog |
| (Mexico) 2020 | Third place | 3rd | 4 | 2 | 0 | 2 | 6 | 3 | Squad | Qualified automatically | | | | | | Kreis |
| Total | — | — | 32 | 20 | 4 | 8 | 72 | 37 | — | 6 | 5 | 1 | 0 | 28 | 2 | — |

Olympic Qualifying Championship history
| First Match | United States 2–1 Mexico (March 25, 1992; Mexico City, Mexico) |
| Biggest Win | United States 6–0 Cuba (March 22, 2012; Nashville, United States) |
| Biggest Defeat | Mexico 4–0 United States (February 10, 2004; Guadalajara, Mexico) |
| Best Result | Champions in 1992 |
| Worst Result | Group stage in 2012 |

== See also ==
- United States Soccer Federation
- United States men's national soccer team
- United States men's national under-17 soccer team
- United States men's national under-20 soccer team
- Football at the Summer Olympics
