= Richard McCallum =

Richard McCallum may refer to:

- Richard McCallum (politician) (1863–1940), New Zealand politician
- Rick McCallum (born 1954), film producer
- Richard McCallum (footballer) (born 1984), Jamaican international footballer
