= Football at the 1996 Summer Olympics – Men's qualification =

The men's qualification for football tournament at the 1996 Summer Olympics.

== Qualifications ==
The following 16 teams qualified for the 1996 Olympic men's football tournament:

Means of qualification	Berths	Qualified
Host nation	1	United States
AFC Preliminary Competition	3	South Korea (winner); Japan (runner-up); Saudi Arabia (third-place)
CAF Preliminary Competition	3	Ghana; Tunisia; Nigeria
CONCACAF Preliminary Competition	1	Mexico (winner)
CONMEBOL Preliminary Competition	2	Brazil (winner); Argentina (runner-up)
1996 UEFA European Under-21 Football Championship	5	Italy (winner); Spain (runner-up); France (third-place); Hungary (5th); Portugal (6th)
1996 CONCACAF–OFC play-off	1	Australia
Total	16	
