= Omar Monjaraz =

Mexican footballer (born 1981)

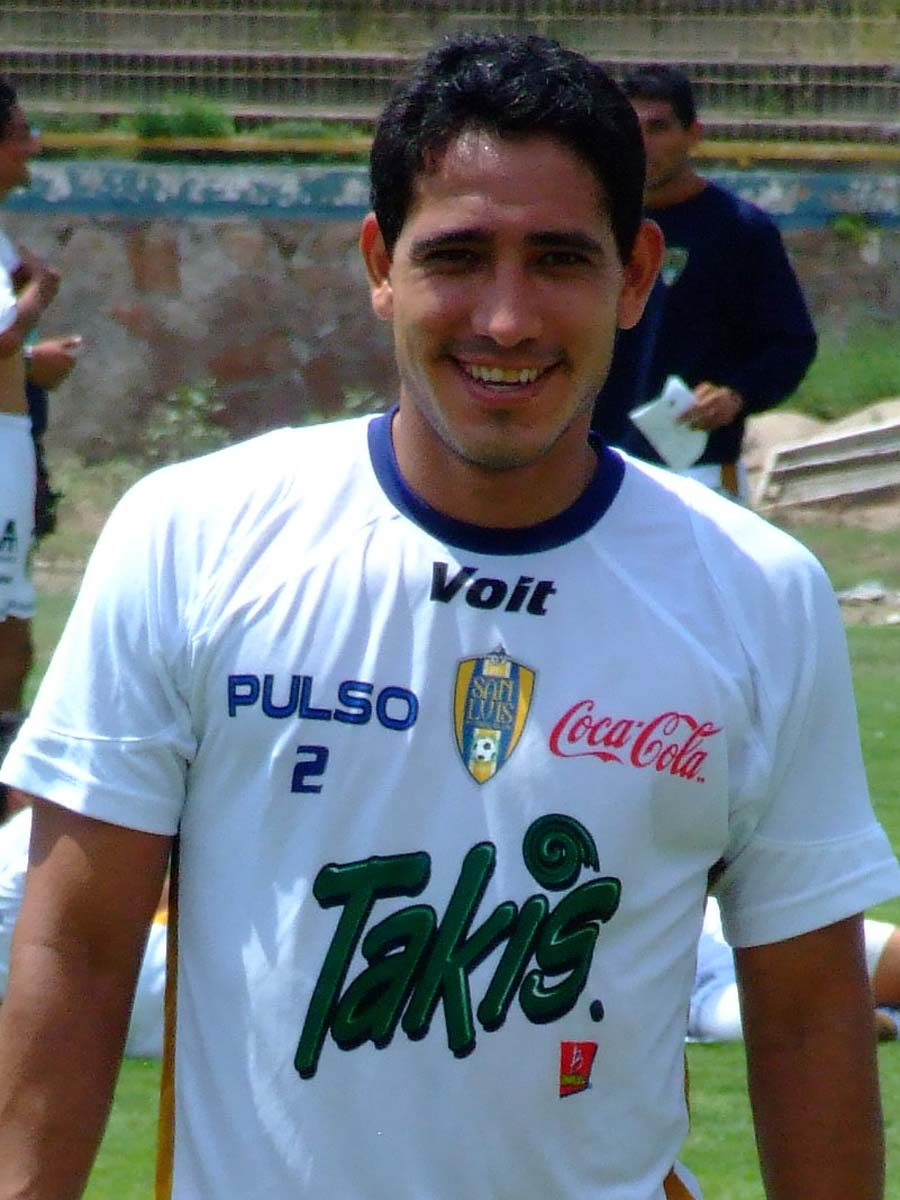

Personal information
- Full name: Omar Monjaraz Campos
- Date of birth: 11 May 1981 (age 45)
- Place of birth: León, Guanajuato, Mexico
- Height: 1.78 m (5 ft 10 in)
- Position: Defender

Senior career*
Years	Team	Apps	(Gls)
1999	León	1	(0)
2001–2002	La Piedad	26	(2)
2002–2003	Jaguares	47	(0)
2004	Tapachula		
2004–2005	Puebla	22	(1)
2005–2007	Jaguares	15	(0)
2006	Petroleros		
2007–2009	San Luis	26	(2)
2010–2011	Lobos		
Medal record
Representing Mexico
Men's Football
Central American and Caribbean Games
Silver medal – second place	2002 San Salvador	Team competition
- * Club domestic league appearances and goals as of 4 March 2008

Omar Monjaraz Campos (born 11 May 1981) is a Mexican football defender.

== Career ==
Born in León, Guanajuato, Monjaraz began playing football with local side Club León. He debuted in the Mexican Primera División with León in 1999, and would feature for C.F. La Piedad, Chiapas, Puebla F.C. and San Luis F.C. in the league until 2009. While with San Luis, Monjaraz participated in the Copa Libertadores, the club's first entry into international club competition.

== Honours ==
Mexico U23

- CONCACAF Olympic Qualifying Championship: 2004
