= Jalal Cheraghpour =

Iranian football manager (born 1950)

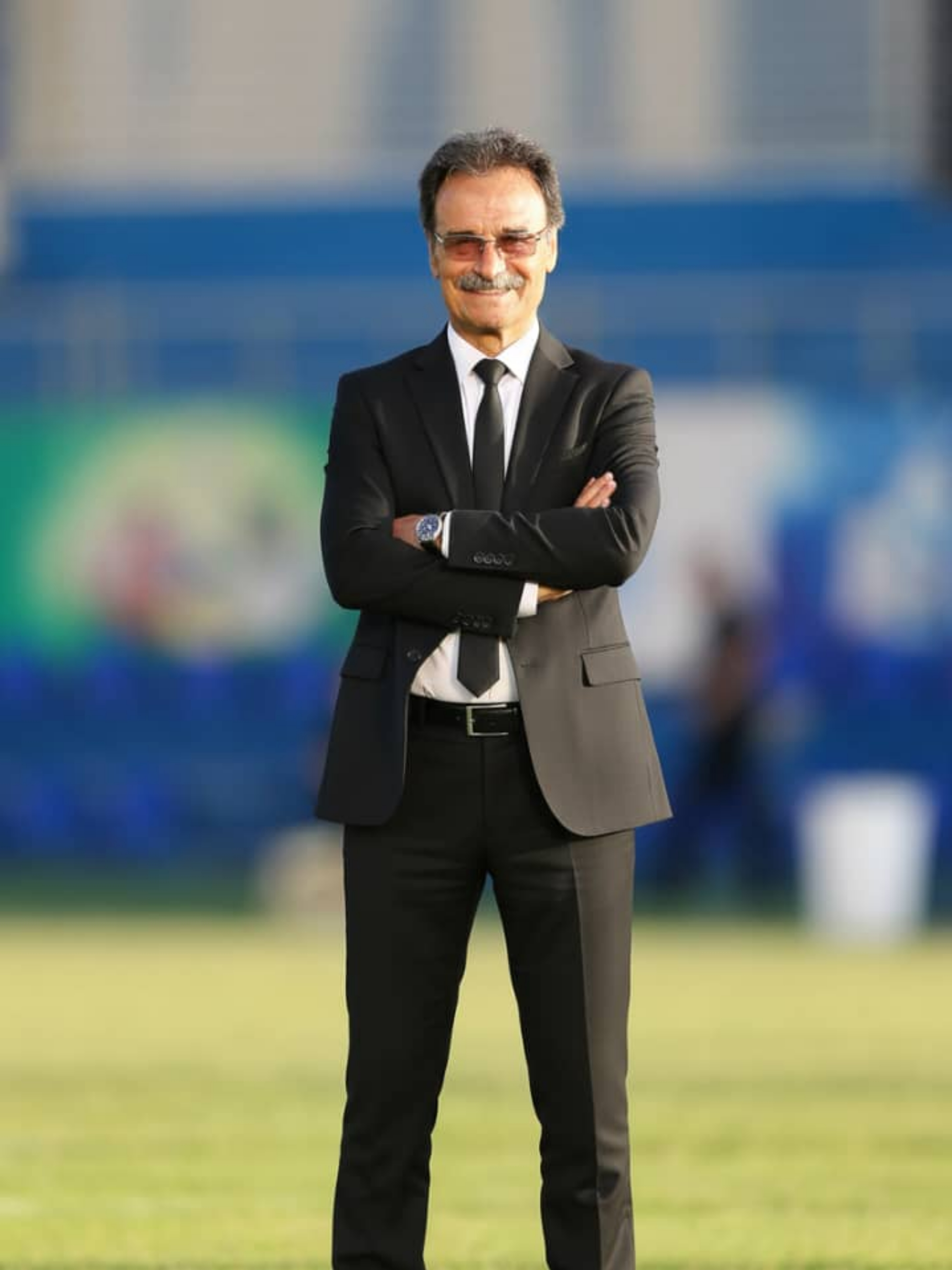
- Jalalcheraghpour in 2025

Personal information
- Date of birth: 22 December 1950 (age 75)
- Place of birth: Tehran, Iran
- Position: Defender

Senior career*
Years	Team	Apps	(Gls)
1975	Rah Ahan Tehran		

Managerial career
- 1970s–1980s: Various (see below)
- 1982: Iran national football team
- 1993: Bank Tejarat
- 1994: Bank Sepah
- 1994: Iran U23 (assistant)
- 1995–1996: Persepolis (technical manager)
- 1996: Iran U23 (assistant)
- 1997–1998: Esteghlal Ahvaz
- 2000–2004: Niroye Zamini
- 2004–2005: Esteghlal Rasht (technical manager)
- 2005–2006: Tractor Sazi Tabriz (technical manager)
- 2007: Pas Hamedan (technical manager)
- 2008: Shirin Faraz (technical manager)
- 2008–2012: Mes Kerman (academy manager)
- 2013–2016: Esteghlal Ahvaz (academy manager)
- 2019: Shahrdari Bandar Abbas (technical manager)
- 2025: Esteghlal (technical manager)
- 2025: Mes Kerman (academy manager)
- 2025–: Mes Rafsanjan (technical manager)
- * Club domestic league appearances and goals

Jalal Cheraghpour' (born 22 December 1950) is an Iranian football manager and former player.

== Early life and education ==
Cheraghpour was born on 22 December 1950 in the Arbab Mahdi Nezamabad neighborhood of Tehran, Iran. He graduated from Tehran's Teachers' Training College (Daneshsaray-e Aali), later working as a teacher in Iran's Ministry of Education.

== Playing career ==
Cheraghpour began his football career in the late 1960s, playing in Tehran's local football scene as a defender. In 1971, he was selected by Frank O'Farrell for the Iran U-23 national team, marking a significant milestone. By 1975, he played for Rah Ahan Tehran under coach Parviz Aboutaleb. Renowned for his man-marking skills against prominent players such as Ali Parvin, Nasser Nooraei, and Parviz Ghelichkhani, Cheraghpour was frequently featured in newspapers and regularly named to the "Team of the Week." A meniscus injury forced his early retirement, prompting a transition to coaching.

== Coaching career ==
Cheraghpour completed FIFA and AFC coaching courses and attended advanced training programs in Hungary and Malaysia. His coaching and administrative career includes:

- 1970s–1980s: Head coach for clubs including Payam and Kheybar Khorramabad.
- 1982: Head coach of the Iran national football team for the 1982 Asian Games in Delhi, appointed at age 31.
- 1980s: Head of the Education Committee of the Islamic Republic of Iran Football Federation.
- 1993: Head coach of Bank Tejarat.
- 1994: Head coach of Bank Sepah.
- 1994: Assistant coach to Hassan Habibi for the Iran U-23 team, alongside Homayoun Shahrokhi and Saleh Nia, under the presidency of Dariush Mostafavi.
- 1995–1996: Technical manager of Persepolis.
- 1996: Assistant coach under Hagi Pedis Anvar for Iran's Olympic qualifying campaign for the 1996 Atlanta Olympics, working with Mohammad Reza Karbakhsh and Jamshid Rashidi.
- 1997–1998: Head coach of Esteghlal Ahvaz.
- 2000–2004: Head coach of Niroye Zamini.
- 2004–2005: Technical manager of Esteghlal Rasht.
- 2005–2006: Technical manager of Tractor Sazi Tabriz.
- 2007: Technical manager of Pas Hamedan.
- 2008: Technical manager of Shirin Faraz.
- 2008–2012: Academy manager of Mes Kerman.
- 2013–2016: Academy manager of Esteghlal Ahvaz.
- 2019: Technical manager of Shahrdari Bandar Abbas.
- 2020s: Appointed Head of the Education Committee of the Islamic Republic of Iran Football Federation under President Shahab Azizi Khadem.
- 2025–present: Assistant manager of Esteghlal.

== Personal life ==
In 2005, Cheraghpour underwent open-heart surgery at Kasra Hospital in Tehran, performed by Dr. Mandegar. Following medical advice to avoid pollution, he relocated to Gilan, Iran, where he currently resides.

== Legacy ==
Cheraghpour's extensive career in Iranian football, spanning playing, coaching, and administrative roles, has significantly influenced the sport's development in Iran. His expertise in player development and tactical coaching remains widely recognized.
