= 2004 CONCACAF Men's Pre-Olympic Tournament qualification =

North American football tournament

The qualifying competition for the 2004 CONCACAF Men's Pre-Olympic Tournament determined the remaining seven teams for the final tournament.

== First round ==
Team 1	Agg.	Team 2	1st leg	2nd leg
Trinidad and Tobago	6–1	Bahamas	3–0	3–1
Nicaragua	3–6	Panama	2–2	1–4
Grenada	10–1	Cayman Islands	5–0	5–1
U.S. Virgin Islands	0–24	Canada	0–10	0–14
Dominican Republic	0–2	Haiti	0–1	0–1
Dominica	1–4	Saint Kitts and Nevis	0–1	1–3
Cuba	1–2	Jamaica	1–1	0–1
Suriname	0–8	Guatemala	0–2	0–6
Guyana	5–3	Barbados	4–1	1–2
Costa Rica	23–0	Belize	15–0	8–0

5 September 2003

Trinidad and Tobago	3–0	Bahamas

Thomas Robinson Stadium, Nassau
7 September 2003

Bahamas	1–3	Trinidad and Tobago

Thomas Robinson Stadium, Nassau

6 September 2003

Nicaragua	2–2	Panama

Estadio Stanley Cayasso, Managua
10 September 2003

Panama	4–1	Nicaragua

Estadio Rommel Fernández, Panama City

6 September 2003

Grenada	5–0	Cayman Islands

Grenada National Stadium, St. George's
12 October 2003

Cayman Islands	1–5	Grenada

Truman Bodden Sports Complex, George Town

7 September 2003

U.S. Virgin Islands	0–10	Canada

Paul E. Joseph Stadium, Fredericksted
10 September 2003

Canada	14–0	U.S. Virgin Islands

Canada Games Stadium, St. Johns

7 September 2003

Dominican Republic	0–1	Haiti

Estadio Parque del Este, Santo Domingo Este
12 October 2003

Haiti	1–0	Dominican Republic

Miami Orange Bowl, Miami

7 September 2003

Dominica	0–1	Saint Kitts and Nevis

Geneva Playing Field, Grand Bay
11 October 2003

Saint Kitts and Nevis	3–1`	Dominica

Warner Park, Basseterre

7 September 2003

Cuba	1–1	Jamaica

Estadio Pedro Marrero, Habana
12 October 2003

Jamaica	1–0	Cuba

Tony Spaulding Sports Complex, Kingston

7 September 2003

Suriname	0–2	Guatemala

André Kamperveen Stadion, Paramaribo
12 October 2003

Guatemala	6–0	Suriname

Estadio Marquesa de la Ensenada, San Marcos

7 September 2003

Guyana	4–1	Barbados

Blairmont Community Centre Ground, Blairmont
12 October 2003

Barbados	2–1	Guyana

Barbados National Stadium, Waterford

13 September 2003

Costa Rica	15–0	Belize

Estadio Eladio Rosabal Cordero, Heredia
15 September 2003

Belize	0–8	Costa Rica

Estadio José Rafael "Fello" Meza Ivankovich , Cartago

== Second round ==
Team 1	Agg.	Team 2	1st leg	2nd leg
Saint Lucia	1–13	Panama	1–6	0–7
El Salvador	1–1 (pen 4-5)	Canada	1–0	0–1
Saint Kitts and Nevis	0–10	United States	0–6	0–4
Grenada	1–4	Trinidad and Tobago	1–1	0–3
Costa Rica	10–1	Guyana	7–0	3–1
Haiti	2–3	Honduras	0–1	2–2
Jamaica	3–2	Guatemala	2–0	1–2

25 October 2003

Saint Lucia	1–6	Panama

Estadio Rommel Fernández, Panama City
28 October 2003

Panama	7–0	Saint Lucia

Estadio Rommel Fernández, Panama City

15 November 2003

El Salvador	1–0	Canada

Estadio Cuscatlán, San Salvador
19 November 2003

Canada	1-0	El Salvador
Penalties
	5–4

Apple Bowl, Kelowna

15 November 2003

Saint Kitts and Nevis	0–6	United States

Warner Park, Basseterre
19 November 2003

United States	4–0	Saint Kitts and Nevis

Maryland SoccerPlex, Georgetown, Maryland

15 November 2003

Grenada	1–1	Trinidad and Tobago

Grenada National Stadium St. George's
19 November 2003

Trinidad and Tobago	3–0	Grenada

Hasely Crawford Stadium, Port of Spain

15 November 2003

Costa Rica	7–0	Guyana

Estadio José Rafael "Fello" Meza Ivancovich, Cartago
23 November 2003

Guyana	1–3	Costa Rica

Blairmont Community Centre Ground, Blairmont

16 November 2003

Haiti	0–1	Honduras

Miami Orange Bowl, Miami
19 November 2003

Honduras	2–2	Haiti

Estadio Nilmo Edwards, La Ceiba

16 November 2003

Jamaica	2–0	Guatemala

Independence Park, Kingston
19 November 2003

Guatemala	2–1 (a.e.t.)	Jamaica

Estadio Marquesa de la Ensenada, San Marcos
