= 1984 CONCACAF Pre-Olympic Tournament =

North American football tournament

Tournament details
- Dates: 1 March – 18 April
- Teams: 3 (from 1 confederation)

Final positions
- Champions: Costa Rica (2nd title)
- Runners-up: Canada
- Third place: Cuba

Tournament statistics
- Matches played: 5
- Top scorer(s): (Canada) Mike Sweeney (2 goals)

The 1984 CONCACAF Pre-Olympic Tournament was the sixth edition of the CONCACAF Pre-Olympic Tournament, the quadrennial, international football tournament organised by the CONCACAF to determine which national teams from the North, Central America and Caribbean region qualify for the Olympic football tournament.

As the top two teams, champions, Costa Rica and Canada qualified for the 1984 Summer Olympics as representatives of CONCACAF.

== Qualification ==
=== Qualified teams ===
The following teams qualified for the final tournament.

| Zone | Country | Method of qualification | Appearance^{1} | Last appearance | Previous best performance | Previous Olympic appearances (last) |
|---|---|---|---|---|---|---|
| North America | Canada | Second round winners | 1st | 0 (debut) | Debutant | |
| Central America | Costa Rica (title holders) | Second round winners | 3rd | 1980 | Winners (1980) | |
| Caribbean | Cuba | Second round winners | 2nd | 1976 | Third place (1976) | |

^{1} Only final tournament.

== Final round ==
| Pos | Team | Pld | W | D | L | GF | GA | GD | Pts | Qualification |
|---|---|---|---|---|---|---|---|---|---|---|
| 1 | Costa Rica (C) | 4 | 1 | 3 | 0 | 1 | 0 | +1 | 5 | Qualification to 1984 Summer Olympics |
| 2 | Canada | 3 | 1 | 2 | 0 | 3 | 0 | +3 | 4 | Qualification to 1984 Summer Olympics |
| 3 | Cuba | 3 | 0 | 1 | 2 | 0 | 4 | −4 | 1 | |

Source: RSSSF
(C) Champions
1 March 1984

| Costa Rica | 1–0 | Cuba |

Estadio Nacional de Costa Rica, San Jose
16 March 1984

| Cuba | 0–0 | Costa Rica |

Estadio Pedro Marrero, Habana
1 April 1984

| Costa Rica | 0–0 | Canada |

Estadio Nacional de Costa Rica, San Jose
14 April 1984

| Canada | 3–0 | Cuba |

Royal Athletic Park, Victoria, British Columbia
18 April 1984

| Canada | 0–0 | Costa Rica |

Royal Athletic Park, Victoria, British Columbia

Canada and Costa Rica qualified for the Olympics as a result of this match, and Cuba were eliminated; therefore, the final Cuba v Canada match was scratched.
