= Rafael Márquez Lugo =

Mexican footballer (born 1981)

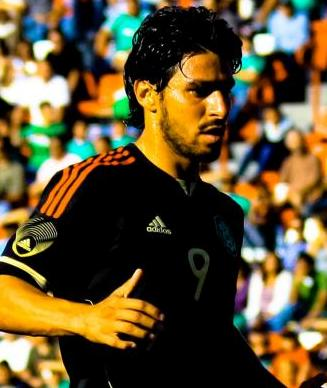
- Márquez Lugo with Mexico in 2011

Personal information
- Full name: Rafael Márquez Lugo
- Date of birth: 2 November 1981 (age 44)
- Place of birth: Mexico City, Mexico
- Height: 1.76 m (5 ft 9 in)
- Position: Forward

Youth career
- UNAM

Senior career*
Years	Team	Apps	(Gls)
2000–2002	UNAM	39	(9)
2003	Chiapas	31	(3)
2004–2007	Morelia	96	(34)
2006	Morelia Primera A	2	(1)
2007–2009	Pachuca	14	(2)
2008	→ Tecos (loan)	13	(2)
2008	→ América (loan)	9	(2)
2009–2011	Atlante	44	(14)
2010–2011	→ Morelia (loan)	39	(15)
2011–2012	Morelia	37	(9)
2012–2014	Guadalajara	54	(21)
Total		378	(113)

International career
2004	Mexico U23	3	(1)
2004–2013	Mexico	16	(1)
Medal record
Representing Mexico
Men's Football
Central American and Caribbean Games
Silver medal – second place	2002 San Salvador	Team competition
- * Club domestic league appearances and goals

Rafael Márquez Lugo (born 2 November 1981) is a Mexican sports analyst and former professional footballer who played as a forward.

== Club career ==
=== Club Universidad Nacional ===
Márquez Lugo joined the Pumas UNAM youth academy when he was six years old. He made his debut in the Primera División on 10 September 2000 against Monterrey. Márquez Lugo played infrequently over the next two years, often as a substitute, making 38 appearances and scoring 9 goals.

=== Chiapas ===
On 23 November 2003 Jaguares de Chiapas announced they had signed Márquez to a three-year contract. Márquez only managed to score three goals in 28 appearances.

=== Morelia ===
In search of more playing time, he signed a three-year deal with Morelia in 2003. In the 2003 Clausura season, he scored seven goals in 13 appearances, and followed that with a team-leading 11 goals in 16 games during the Apertura 2004 season. In the Clausura 2005 season he scored 6 goals. Márquez's contract expired in 2007 and the club chose not to renew him despite his 34 goals in 96 appearances.

=== Pachuca ===
Márquez was transferred to Pachuca in 2007. Coach Enrique Meza chose to place him on the loan list after his poor season with the team, where he only managed to net 3 times.

==== Loan to UAG Tecos ====
On January 11, 2008, he was loaned to UAG Tecos for six months. After his stint at Tecos, Márquez was loaned to América.

==== Loan to Club América ====
Márquez Lugo was loaned to América for six months. He scored 2 goals in 9 appearances

=== Atlante ===
Atlante F.C. announced they had signed Márquez Lugo for the Clausura 2009 season. Márquez Lugo scored 14 goals during his time with "Los Potros".

=== Return to Monarcas ===
In 2010, Márquez Lugo returned to Morelia. In his first season, he scored two goals with the club. His return debut goal was scored in a 6–0 victory against Querétaro. His second goal of the season came in a 1–0 home win against Club Necaxa.

In the 2011 Clausura season, Marquez Lugo was a regular starter for Morelia. His first goal of the season against C.D. Guadalajara. It was the equalizer in the 1–1 tie. His second goal came in the very next match against Querétaro. The game ended in a 3–0 away victory. His third goal of the season came against América in the 2–1 away victory. On the 6 of March 2011, he scored a hat-trick for the first time in his career. It came in the 6–1 away victory against Toluca. With this hat-trick he reached 6 goals. On 19 March 2011 he made his seventh goal of the tournament against Santos Laguna in a 1–0 away win for Morelia. His eighth goal of the tournament came on the 9 of April against Cruz Azul. He scored the 1–1 draw for Morelia in an eventual 3–2 away win. On April 12 against Jaguares he scored his ninth goal. He scored the equalizer and eventually Monarcas Morelia won 2–1. He scored the first goal of the Clausura 2012 against Club Tijuana. His performances earned him a call-up to the Selección de fútbol de México (Mexico national football team). After playing the best football of his career with Morelia, C.D. Guadalajara announced that they had reached an agreement to sign him.

=== C.D. Guadalajara ===
On June 6, 2012, it was announced that C.D. Guadalajara purchased him as their second signing of the transfer window. On July 22, 2012, he made his first official appearance with Guadalajara during an away game against Club Toluca. He netted his first goal during his first appearance in a 2–1 loss. On September 14, 2012, on a visit to Club León, he scored a goal, giving Guadalajara their second win of the season. He led Guadalajara with seven goals in the 2012 Apertura season. In November 2012, the club announced Márquez Lugo was going to have surgery on his left knee after suffering an injury and he was ruled out of action for 3 months. After his return from injury, Márquez Lugo once again led the club's scoring sheet by scoring 14 more goals in all of 2013. In March 2014, Guadalajara had announced that Márquez Lugo had injured the same left knee. He was successfully operated on April 1 and was expected to return in 3–4 months. During physical therapy Márquez Lugo complained that the pain would not alleviate and after further examination from the club doctor, Dr. Rafael Ortega, it was announced that he needed to have a cartilage transplant. Surgery was performed on 19 August 2014 and Dr. Ortega informed the public that Márquez Lugo would be ruled out of action for approximately 6 months. Márquez Lugo's recovery was taking longer than the doctor expected, and his knee was not improving.

On April 22, 2015, during a news interview with TDN Deportes, Márquez Lugo announced his retirement from play after three surgeries and a year-long battle he had failed to win against his knee injury.

== International career ==
Márquez Lugo made numerous appearances for Mexico youth national teams, including the U-20 and U-23 levels. He appeared in the 2004 Summer Olympics with the Under-23 squad. He has also was called up by Ricardo Lavolpe to play for the Mexico national football team, which included call-ups to the 2005 FIFA Confederations Cup and the 2005 CONCACAF Gold Cup. Márquez Lugo was announced as one of the 3 over-aged players named to the U-22 team that represented Mexico in the 2011 Copa América. Márquez Lugo appeared in all three of Mexico's matches before they were eliminated.

== Career statistics ==
=== International ===
As of match played 25 July 2013

National team	Year	Apps	Goals
Mexico	2004	1	0
Mexico	2005	4	0
Mexico	2006	1	0
Mexico	2007	0	0
Mexico	2008	0	0
Mexico	2009	0	0
Mexico	2010	0	0
Mexico	2011	3	0
Mexico	2012	1	1
Mexico	2013	6	0
Total		16	1

=== Internationals goals ===
No.	Date	Venue	Opponent	Score	Result	Competition
1	January 25, 2012	Reliant Stadium, Houston, United States	Venezuela	2–1	3–1	Friendly

== Personal life ==
Márquez Lugo is married to Mexican television personality, actor, and beauty pageant Marisol González who was part of the 2003 Miss Universe and winner of the 2002 Nuestra Belleza México. Márquez Lugo and González have two daughters together and have been married since 2014.

== Honours ==
Pachuca

- North American SuperLiga: 2007

Atlante

- CONCACAF Champions League: 2008–09

Morelia

- North American SuperLiga: 2010

Mexico U23

- CONCACAF Olympic Qualifying Championship: 2004

Individual

- CONCACAF Men's Olympic Qualifying Championship Best XI: 2004
- Mexican Primera División Best Forward: Clausura 2011
