= Hermann Trophy =

Award annually given to American college soccer players

Missouri Athletic Club Hermann Trophy
- Awarded for: Honoring the top collegiate soccer players in the United States.

History
- First award: 1986
- Website: www.machermanntrophy.org

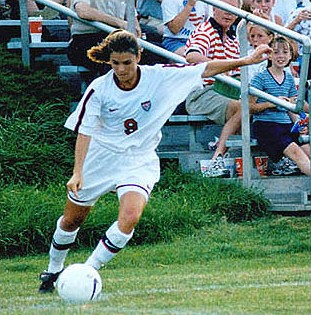
Two-time Hermann Trophy recipient Mia Hamm (1992–93) during a United States women's national soccer team match (1995)

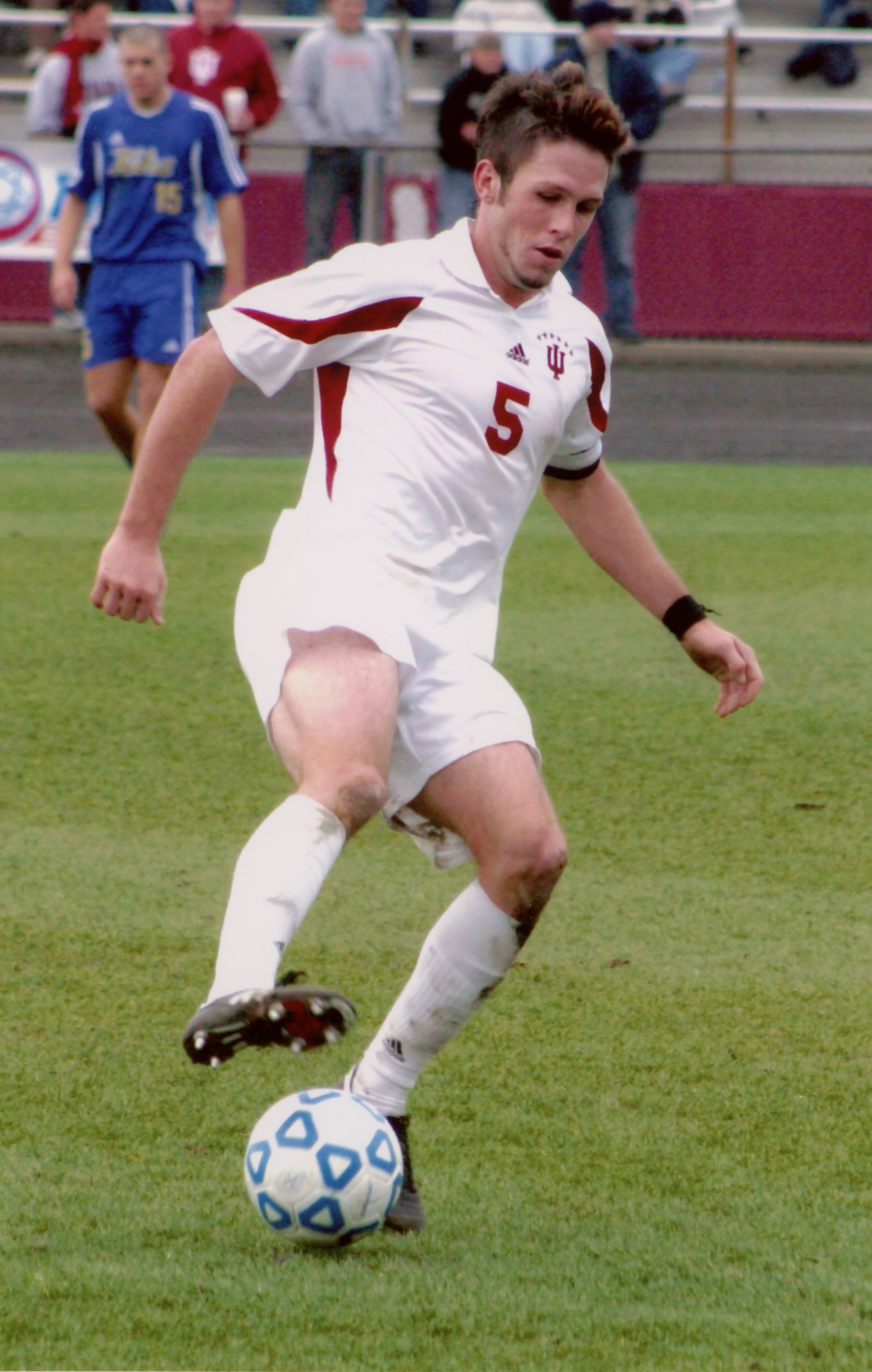
2004 Hermann Trophy winner Danny O'Rourke playing for the Indiana Hoosiers in 2004

The Hermann Trophy is awarded annually by the Missouri Athletic Club to the United States's top men's and women's college soccer players.

== History ==
In 1967, Bob Hermann, the president of the National Professional Soccer League (NPSL) and the Chairman of the Executive Committee of the NPSL's successor, the North American Soccer League, established a trophy to annually recognize the top men's collegiate soccer player. The trophy, which was first announced in the December 9, 1967 issue of The Sporting News, was named the Hermann Trophy and has been awarded each year since. In 1988, a second Hermann Trophy was inaugurated to recognize the top women's collegiate player of the year.

In 1986, the Missouri Athletic Club (MAC) began naming an annual player of the year as a rival to the Hermann Trophy. Then in 1996, the National Soccer Coaches Association of America (NSCAA) initiated its own annual player of the year award. These three competing awards began merging three years later when the NSCAA and MAC agreed to cooperate on naming a combined collegiate player of the year. Finally, beginning in 2002, the MAC/NSCAA and Hermann Trophy organization merged to create a unified trophy for the top college soccer player of the year.

The original Hermann Award Trophy is on display in the Hermann Atrium located in the McDonnell Athletic Center at MICDS in Ladue, Missouri. The original trophy was donated to the school by Hermann in 2003.

The current MAC Hermann Trophy is on display in the lobbies of the Missouri Athletic Club's Downtown and West County Clubhouses.

== Selection process ==
Today, the process of selecting a winner begins at the start of the college soccer season when a list of potential nominees is compiled by a nominating committee. Near the end of the collegiate regular season, 15 players whom the committee considers the best in Division I soccer are announced as semifinalists for the award. That list is then voted on through an online voting process by men's and women's Division I soccer coaches whose teams are current NSCAA College Services members. In early December the top three vote-getters for both the men's and women's trophy are announced as finalists for the award. These six individuals are invited to an annual banquet held at the Missouri Athletic Club of St. Louis. That evening, the winners of the two awards are announced and receive a 10-pound crystal replica soccer ball made by Tyrone Crystal of County Tyrone, Northern Ireland.

== Hermann Trophy (men's) ==
| Year | Hermann Trophy | MAC Player of the Year | NSCAA Player of the Year |
|---|---|---|---|
| 2025 | Donavan Phillip, NC State | | |
| 2024 | Michael Adedokun, Ohio State | | |
| 2023 | Ousmane Sylla, Clemson | | |
| 2022 | Duncan McGuire, Creighton | | |
| 2021 | Dante Polvara, Georgetown | | |
| 2020 | Gloire Amanda, Oregon State | | |
| 2019 | Robbie Robinson, Clemson | | |
| 2018 | Andrew Gutman, Indiana | | |
| 2017 | Jon Bakero, Wake Forest | | |
| 2016 | Ian Harkes, Wake Forest | | |
| 2015 | Jordan Morris, Stanford | | |
| 2014 | Leo Stolz, UCLA | | |
| 2013 | Patrick Mullins, Maryland | | |
| 2012 | Patrick Mullins, Maryland | | |
| 2011 | Andrew Wenger, Duke | | |
| 2010 | Darlington Nagbe, Akron | | |
| 2009 | Teal Bunbury, Akron | | |
| 2008 | Marcus Tracy, Wake Forest | | |
| 2007 | O'Brian White, UConn | | |
| 2006 | Joseph Lapira, Notre Dame | | |
| 2005 | Jason Garey, Maryland | | |
| 2004 | Danny O'Rourke, Indiana | | |
| 2003 | Chris Wingert, St. John's | | |
| 2002 | Alecko Eskandarian, Virginia | | |
| 2001 | Luchi Gonzalez, SMU | Luchi Gonzalez, SMU | |
| 2000 | Chris Gbandi, UConn | Ali Curtis, Duke | |
| 1999 | Ali Curtis, Duke | Sasha Victorine, UCLA | |
| 1998 | Wojtek Krakowiak, Clemson | Jay Heaps, Duke | Dema Kovalenko, Indiana |
| 1997 | Johnny Torres, Creighton | Johnny Torres, Creighton | Daniel Hernandez, SMU |
| 1996 | Mike Fisher, Virginia | Mike Fisher, Virginia | Mike Fisher, Virginia |
| 1995 | Mike Fisher, Virginia | Matt McKeon, St. Louis | |
| 1994 | Brian Maisonneuve, Indiana | Todd Yeagley, Indiana | |
| 1993 | Claudio Reyna, Virginia | Claudio Reyna, Virginia | |
| 1992 | Brad Friedel, UCLA | Claudio Reyna, Virginia | |
| 1991 | Alexi Lalas, Rutgers | Alexi Lalas, Rutgers | |
| 1990 | Ken Snow, Indiana | Ken Snow, Indiana | |
| 1989 | Tony Meola, Virginia | Tony Meola, Virginia | |
| 1988 | Ken Snow, Indiana | Ken Snow, Indiana | |
| 1987 | Bruce Murray, Clemson | John Harkes, Virginia | |
| 1986 | John Kerr, Duke | John Kerr, Duke | |
| 1985 | Tom Kain, Duke | | |
| 1984 | Amr Aly, Columbia | | |
| 1983 | Mike Jeffries, Duke | | |
| 1982 | Joe Ulrich, Duke | | |
| 1981 | Armando Betancourt, Indiana | | |
| 1980 | Joe Morrone, UConn | | |
| 1979 | Jim Stamatis, Penn State | | |
| 1978 | Angelo DiBernardo, Indiana | | |
| 1977 | Billy Gazonas, Hartwick | | |
| 1976 | Glenn Myernick, Hartwick | | |
| 1975 | Steve Ralbovsky, Brown | | |
| 1974 | Farrukh Quarishi, SUNY Oneonta | | |
| 1973 | Dan Counce, St. Louis | | |
| 1972 | Mike Seerey, St. Louis | | |
| 1971 | Mike Seerey, St. Louis | | |
| 1970 | Al Trost, St. Louis | | |
| 1969 | Al Trost, St. Louis | | |
| 1968 | Manuel Hernandez, San Jose State | | |
| 1967 | Dov Markus, Long Island | | |

Unified with Hermann Trophy Award
Unified with MAC Award
Not awarded

== Hermann Trophy (women's) ==
| Year | Hermann Trophy | MAC Player of the Year | NSCAA Player of the Year |
|---|---|---|---|
| 2025 | Jasmine Aikey, Stanford | | |
| 2024 | Kate Faasse, North Carolina | | |
| 2023 | Onyi Echegini, Florida State | | |
| 2022 | Michelle Cooper, Duke | | |
| 2021 | Jaelin Howell, Florida State | | |
| 2020 | Jaelin Howell, Florida State | | |
| 2019 | Catarina Macario, Stanford | | |
| 2018 | Catarina Macario, Stanford | | |
| 2017 | Andi Sullivan, Stanford | | |
| 2016 | Kadeisha Buchanan, West Virginia | | |
| 2015 | Raquel Rodríguez, Penn State | | |
| 2014 | Morgan Brian, Virginia | | |
| 2013 | Morgan Brian, Virginia | | |
| 2012 | Crystal Dunn, North Carolina | | |
| 2011 | Teresa Noyola, Stanford | | |
| 2010 | Christen Press, Stanford | | |
| 2009 | Kelley O'Hara, Stanford | | |
| 2008 | Kerri Hanks, Notre Dame | | |
| 2007 | Mami Yamaguchi, Florida State | | |
| 2006 | Kerri Hanks, Notre Dame | | |
| 2005 | Christine Sinclair, Portland | | |
| 2004 | Christine Sinclair, Portland | | |
| 2003 | Cat Reddick, North Carolina | | |
| 2002 | Aly Wagner, Santa Clara | | |
| 2001 | Christie Welsh, Penn State | Christie Welsh, Penn State | |
| 2000 | Anne Mäkinen, Notre Dame | Anne Mäkinen, Notre Dame | |
| 1999 | Mandy Clemens, Santa Clara | Mandy Clemens, Santa Clara | |
| 1998 | Cindy Parlow, North Carolina | Cindy Parlow, North Carolina | Danielle Fotopoulos, Florida |
| 1997 | Cindy Parlow, North Carolina | Cindy Parlow, North Carolina | Sara Whalen, UConn |
| 1996 | Cindy Daws, Notre Dame | Cindy Daws, Notre Dame | Jennifer Renola, Notre Dame |
| 1995 | Shannon MacMillan, Portland | Shannon MacMillan, Portland | |
| 1994 | Tisha Venturini, North Carolina | Tisha Venturini, North Carolina | |
| 1993 | Mia Hamm, North Carolina | Mia Hamm, North Carolina | |
| 1992 | Mia Hamm, North Carolina | Mia Hamm, North Carolina | |
| 1991 | Kristine Lilly, North Carolina | Kristine Lilly, North Carolina | |
| 1990 | April Kater, Massachusetts | April Kater, Massachusetts | |
| 1989 | Shannon Higgins, North Carolina | Shannon Higgins, North Carolina | |
| 1988 | Michelle Akers, UCF | Michelle Akers, UCF | |

Unified with Hermann Trophy Award
Unified with MAC Award
Not awarded

== See also ==
- Soccer America Player of the Year Award
- TopDrawerSoccer.com National Player of the Year Award
- ISAA Player of the Year (discontinued)
- List of sports awards honoring women
