= 1980 CONCACAF Pre-Olympic Tournament qualification =

North American football tournament

The qualifying competition for the 1980 CONCACAF Men's Pre-Olympic Tournament determined the three teams for the final tournament.

== North American Zone ==
=== First round ===
1 April 1979

Bermuda	3–0	Canada

Bermuda National Stadium, Hamilton
27 May 1979

Canada	2–5	Bermuda

TD Place Stadium, Ottawa, Ontario

23 May 1979

Mexico	0–2 (Note: Forfeited)	United States

Estadio La Martinica, León
3 June 1979

United States	2–0 (Note: Forfeited)	Mexico

Giant Stadium, East Rutherford

=== Second round ===
2 December 1979

Bermuda	0–3	United States

Bermuda National Stadium, Hamilton
12 December 1979

United States	5–0	Bermuda

Lockhart Stadium, Fort Lauderdale, Florida

== Central American Zone ==
=== First round ===
22 May 1979

Costa Rica	4–0	Panama
Gutiérrez; Ulate

Estadio Ricardo Saprissa Aymá, San Juan de Tibás
Attendance: 6,987
25 May 1979

Panama	0–2	Costa Rica

Estadio Nacional de Costa Rica, San José

13 May 1979

Guatemala	2–0	El Salvador

Estadio Doroteo Guamuch Flores, Ciudad de Guatemala
20 May 1979

El Salvador	1–0	Guatemala

Estadio Jorge "Mágico" González, San Salvador

=== Second round ===
25 July 1979

Costa Rica	1–2	Guatemala

Estadio Nacional de Costa Rica, San José
5 August 1979

Guatemala	0–1	Costa Rica

Estadio Doroteo Guamuch Flores, Ciudad de Guatemala

==== Playoff ====
26 August 1979

Costa Rica	1–0	Guatemala

Estadio Cuscatlán, Salvador

== Caribbean Zone ==
=== First round ===
31 March 1979

Haiti	4–1	Dominican Republic

Stade Sylvio Cator, Port-au-Prince
27 May 1979

Dominican Republic	0–3	Haiti

Stade Sylvio Cator, Port-au-Prince

1 April 1979

Jamaica	0–3	Cuba

Independence Park, Kingston
27 May 1979

Cuba	2–0	Jamaica

Estadio Pedro Marrero, Havana

1 April 1979

Barbados	1–2	Suriname

Barbados National Stadium, Bridgetown
27 May 1979

Suriname	5–1	Barbados

André Kamperveen Stadion, Paramaribo

1 April 1979

Curaçao	2–3	Trinidad and Tobago

Trinidad Stadium "Wilhelminastadion", Oranjestad
27 May 1979

Trinidad and Tobago	6–1	Curaçao

Skinner Park, San Fernando

=== Second round ===
2 December 1979

Haiti	0–0	Cuba

Stade Sylvio Cator, Port-au-Prince
12 December 1979

Cuba	0–1	Haiti

Estadio Pedro Marrero, Habana

2 December 1979

Trinidad and Tobago	2–0	Suriname

Skinner Park, San Fernando
12 December 1979

Suriname	3–1	Trinidad and Tobago

André Kamperveen Stadion, Paramaribo

==== Playoff ====
19 December 1979

Trinidad and Tobago	0–2	Suriname

Georgetown Cricket Club Ground "Bourda", Georgetown

=== Third round ===
1 March 1980

Haiti	2–0	Suriname

Stade Sylvio Cator, Port-au-Prince
5 March 1980

Suriname	2–0	Haiti

André Kamperveen Stadion, Paramaribo

==== Playoff ====
7 March 1980

Haiti	0–2	Suriname

Queen's Park Oval, Port of Spain
