= 1972 CONCACAF Pre-Olympic Tournament qualification =

North American football tournament

The qualifying competition for the 1972 CONCACAF Pre-Olympic Tournament determined the four teams for the final tournament.

== First round ==
=== Group 1 ===
Pos	Team	Pld	W	D	L	GF	GA	GD	Pts
1	Mexico	4	3	0	1	6	1	+5	6
2	Canada	4	2	1	1	5	2	+3	5
3	Bermuda	4	0	1	3	1	9	−8	1

30 May 1971

Bermuda	0–3	Canada

Bermuda National Stadium, Hamilton
8 June 1971

Mexico	1–0	Canada

Estadio Azteca, Ciudad de México
13 June 1971

Canada	1–1	Bermuda

Varsity Stadium, Toronto
24 August 1971

Canada	1–0	Mexico

Empire Stadium, Vancouver
6 October 1971

Bermuda	0–2	Mexico

Bermuda National Stadium, Hamilton
13 October 1971

Mexico	3–0	Bermuda

Estadio Azteca, Ciudad de México

=== Group 2 ===
Pos	Team	Pld	W	D	L	GF	GA	GD	Pts
1	Guatemala	3	2	1	0	7	3	+4	5
2	Suriname	4	1	1	2	6	7	−1	3
3	Panama	3	1	0	2	5	8	−3	2

18 July 1971

Guatemala	2–2	Suriname

Estadio Doroteo Guamuch Flores, Ciudad de Guatemala
22 July 1971

Guatemala	4–1	Panama

Estadio Doroteo Guamuch Flores, Ciudad de Guatemala
25 July 1971

Panama	4–1	Suriname

Estadio Doroteo Guamuch Flores, Ciudad de Guatemala
27 July 1971

Suriname	3–0	Panama

Estadio Doroteo Guamuch Flores, Ciudad de Guatemala
30 July 1971

Suriname	0–1	Guatemala

Estadio Doroteo Guamuch Flores, Ciudad de Guatemala
2 August 1971

Panama	1-3	Guatemala

Estadio Doroteo Guamuch Flores, Ciudad de Guatemala

=== Group 3 ===
Pos	Team	Pld	W	D	L	GF	GA	GD	Pts
1	United States	4	2	2	0	8	3	+5	6
2	El Salvador	4	2	2	0	9	4	+5	6
3	Barbados	4	0	0	4	3	13	−10	0

18 July 1971

United States	1–1	El Salvador

Hialeah Stadium, Hialeah
25 July 1971

United States	3–0	Barbados

Hialeah Stadium, Hialeah
1 August 1971

Barbados	0–3	El Salvador

Bermuda National Stadium, Hamilton
8 August 1971

El Salvador	4–2	Barbados

Estadio Jorge "Mágico" González, San Salvador
15 August 1971

El Salvador	1–1	United States

Estadio Jorge "Mágico" González, San Salvador
22 August 1971

Barbados	1–3	United States

Bermuda National Stadium, Hamilton

==== Playoff ====
18 September 1971

El Salvador	1–1	United States
Penalties
	5–6

USA qualify for the final round.

=== Group 4 ===
Pos	Team	Pld	W	D	L	GF	GA	GD	Pts
1	Jamaica	2	1	1	0	3	1	+2	3
2	Netherlands Antilles	2	0	1	1	1	3	−2	1
3	Costa Rica withdrawn	0	0	0	0	0	0	0	0

29 May 1971

Jamaica	2–1	Netherlands Antilles

Independence Park, Kingston
24 July 1971

Netherlands Antilles	1–1	Jamaica

Ergilio Hato Stadium, Willemstad
