= Diego Martínez (Mexican footballer, born 1981) =

Mexican footballer

Personal information
- Full name: Diego Alfonso Martínez Balderas
- Date of birth: 15 February 1981 (age 45)
- Place of birth: Mexico City, Mexico
- Height: 1.83 m (6 ft 0 in)
- Position: Right-back

Senior career*
Years	Team	Apps	(Gls)
2001–2006	Club Necaxa	147	(17)
2006–2012	Guadalajara	64	(3)
2007	→ Morelia (loan)	21	(0)
2008	→ Tigres UANL (loan)	19	(0)
2009	→ C.F. Monterrey (loan)	15	(0)
2010	→ San Luis (loan)	0	(0)
2010–2011	→ Veracruz (loan)	?	(0)
2011	→ La Piedad (loan)	0	(0)
2013	Querétaro	0	(0)

International career^{‡}
2004	Mexico U23	3	(0)
2003–2009	Mexico	12	(3)

Managerial career
- 2019–2020: Puebla Reserves and Academy
- * Club domestic league appearances and goals as of 30 March 2015 ‡ National team caps and goals as of 28 January 2009

Diego Alfonso Martínez Balderas (born 15 February 1981) is a Mexican former professional footballer who played as a right-back.

== Biography ==
Martínez made his debut in the Invierno 2001 season with Necaxa. His ability to attack made him a fan favorite and quickly earned him a starting position. He signed with Chivas in 2006, where he immediately became an important part of the team. Martínez usually played in the right wingback position with Chivas, providing the team with crosses and through passes in the attack. However, he excelled more in his defending duties.

Martínez lost favor with Chivas and was sent out on loan with various teams such as Morelia, Tigres, C.F. Monterrey, San Luis, Tiburones Rojos de Veracruz, and most recently CF La Piedad, until July 2012, when he received a second shot with Chivas, which included Diego in the squad for the next Apertura tournament. He was then released from his contract and he signed with Querétaro. He was only featured in the Copa MX. After his release of yet another team, Martínez chose to retire. In 2014, he joined an organization named Glorias del Deporte, aimed to get kids to play football and get away from drugs. He is one of the head coaches, and the organization travels all over Mexico.

== International career ==
Martínez has played in several national Mexican youth teams, and was captain of the Mexican National U-23 Team during the 2004 Olympic Trials. He received his first summons for the senior Mexico national team in 2003. Martínez was called upon by former Mexico national team coach Ricardo Antonio Lavolpe on several occasions in search for the team that would play in the 2006 FIFA World Cup.

== Career statistics ==
=== International goals ===
No.	Date	Venue	Opponent	Score	Result	Competition	Ref.
1.	March 10, 2004	Tuxtla Gutierrez, Mexico	Ecuador	2–1	Win	Friendly	
2.	March 31, 2004	Carson, California, United States	Costa Rica	2–0	Win	Friendly	
3.	October 26, 2005	Guadalajara, Jalisco, Mexico	Uruguay	3–1	Win	Friendly	

=== International caps ===
As of 28 January 2009

International appearances
#	Date	Venue	Opponent	Result	Competition
1.	February 4, 2003	Los Angeles Memorial Coliseum, Los Angeles, United States	Argentina	0–1	Friendly
2.	October 15, 2003	Soldier Field, Chicago, United States	Uruguay	0–2	Friendly
3.	18 February 2004	The Home Depot Center, Carson, United States	Chile	1–1	Friendly
4.	10 March 2004	Estadio Víctor Manuel Reyna, Tuxtla Gutiérrez, Mexico	Ecuador	2–1	Friendly
5.	March 31, 2004	The Home Depot Center, Carson, United States	Costa Rica	2–0	Friendly
6.	28 April 2004	Cotton Bowl, Dallas, United States	United States	0–1	Friendly
7.	26 October 2005	Estadio Jalisco, Guadalajara, Mexico	Uruguay	3–1	Friendly
8.	17 November 2005	Reliant Stadium, Houston, United States	Bulgaria	0–3	Friendly
9.	1 March 2006	Pizza Hut Park, Frisco, Texas, United States	Ghana	1–0	Friendly
10.	24 September 2008	Memorial Coliseum, Los Angeles, United States	Chile	0–1	Friendly
11.	12 November 2008	Chase Field, Phoenix, Arizona, United States	Ecuador	2–1	Friendly
12.	28 January 2009	Oakland–Alameda County Coliseum, Oakland, California, United States	Sweden	0–1	Friendly

== Honours ==
Mexico U23

- CONCACAF Olympic Qualifying Championship: 2004

Individual

- CONCACAF Men's Olympic Qualifying Championship Best XI: 2004
