= 1984 CONCACAF Pre-Olympic Tournament qualification =

North American football tournament

The qualifying competition for the 1984 CONCACAF Pre-Olympic Tournament determined the three teams for the final tournament.

== North American Zone ==
=== First round ===
8 March 1983

Canada	6–0	Bermuda

Swangard Stadium, Burnaby, British Columbia,
15 March 1983

Bermuda	1–1	Canada

Bermuda National Stadium, Hamilton

8 March 1983

Mexico	6–0	Bahamas

Estadio Nemesio Díez, Toluca
29 March 1983

Bahamas	0–0	Mexico

Thomas Robinson Stadium, Nassau

=== Second round ===
23 October 1983

Canada	1–0	Mexico

Royal Athletic Park, Victoria, British Columbia
6 November 1983

Mexico	2–1	Canada

Estadio Nemesio Díez, Toluca

==== Playoff ====
20 December 1983

Mexico	0–1	Canada

Lockhart Stadium, Fort Lauderdale, Florida

== Central American Zone ==
=== First round ===
22 May 1983

El Salvador	0–2	Guatemala
		Fernández; Pérez

Estadio Cuscatlán, San Salvador
Attendance: 22,000
25 May 1983

Guatemala	4–0	El Salvador

Estadio Doroteo Guamuch Flores, Ciudad de Guatemala

11 May 1983

Honduras	0–1	Costa Rica

Estadio Nacional Chelato Uclés, Tegucigalpa
18 May 1983

Costa Rica	3–2	Honduras

Estadio Nacional de Costa Rica, San José

=== Second round ===
23 October 1983

Costa Rica	1–0	Guatemala

Estadio Nacional de Costa Rica, San José
30 October 1983

Guatemala	1–1	Costa Rica

Estadio Doroteo Guamuch Flores, Ciudad de Guatemala

== Caribbean Zone ==
=== Preliminary round ===
1 March 1983

Antigua and Barbuda	0–1	Barbados

Antigua Recreation Ground, St. John's, Antigua and Barbuda
8 March 1983

Barbados	2–1	Antigua and Barbuda

Barbados National Stadium, Bridgetown

1 March 1983

Jamaica	1–0	Cuba

Jarrett Park, Montego Bay
8 March 1983

Cuba	4–1	Jamaica

Estadio Pedro Marrero, Havana

==== Playoff ====
22 March 1983

Cuba	2–0	Barbados

Estadio Pedro Marrero, Havana
29 March 1983

Barbados	0–0	Cuba

Barbados National Stadium, Bridgetown

=== First round ===
8 May 1983

Suriname	1–0	Cuba

André Kamperveen Stadion, Paramaribo
15 May 1983

Cuba	3–0	Suriname

Estadio Pedro Marrero, Habana

8 May 1983

Trinidad and Tobago	1–0	Curaçao

Arima Velodrome, Arima
15 May 1983

Curaçao	0–0	Trinidad and Tobago

Ergilio Hato Stadium, Willemstad

=== Second round ===
1 November 1983

Cuba	2–0	Trinidad and Tobago

Estadio Pedro Marrero, Havana
8 November 1983

Trinidad and Tobago	2–0	Cuba

Hasely Crawford Stadium, Port of Spain

==== Playoff ====
15 November 1983

Cuba	1–0	Trinidad and Tobago

Estadio Nacional de Costa Rica, San José
