= 1988 CONCACAF Pre-Olympic Tournament =

North American football tournament

Tournament details
- Dates: 5 September 1987 – 25 May 1988
- Teams: 6 (from 1 confederation)

Tournament statistics
- Matches played: 11
- Top scorer: (United States) Brent Goulet (6 goals)

The 1988 CONCACAF Pre-Olympic Tournament was the seventh edition of the CONCACAF Pre-Olympic Tournament, the quadrennial, international football tournament organised by the CONCACAF to determine which national teams from the North, Central America and Caribbean region qualify for the Olympic football tournament.

United States and Guatemala qualified for the 1988 Summer Olympics: Mexico had originally qualified, but were disqualified after receiving a two-year suspension by FIFA arising from the Cachirules scandal.

== Qualification ==
=== Qualified teams ===
The following teams qualified for the final tournament.

Zone	Country	Method of qualification	Appearance^{1}	Last appearance	Previous best performance	Previous Olympic appearances (last)
North America	Mexico	First round winners	4th	1976	Winners (1964, 1972, 1976)	
North America	United States	First round winners	4th	1980	Runners-up (1972, 1980)	
Central America	El Salvador	First round winners	2nd	1968	Final round winner without outright champions (1968)	
Central America	Guatemala	First round winners	4th	1976	Runners-up (1976)	
Caribbean	Guyana	Second round winners	1st	0 (debut)	Debutant	
Caribbean	Trinidad and Tobago	Second round winners	2nd	1968	Final round (1968)	

^{1} Only final tournament.

== Final round ==
=== Group A ===
Pos	Team	Pld	W	D	L	GF	GA	GD	Pts	Qualification
1	United States	4	4	0	0	13	4	+9	8	Qualification to 1988 Summer Olympics
2	Trinidad and Tobago	3	1	0	2	2	5	−3	2	
3	El Salvador	3	0	0	3	3	9	−6	0	

Source: CONCACAF
5 September 1987

United States	4–1	Trinidad and Tobago

West Community Stadium, Fenton
Referee: J. Chinchilla (Guatemala)
20 September 1987

Trinidad and Tobago	0–1	United States

Queen's Park Oval, Port of Spain
Referee: R. Paz Escoto (Honduras)
18 October 1987

El Salvador	2–4	United States

Estadio Cuscatlán, San Salvador
Referee: D. Douglas (Canada)
15 May 1988

El Salvador	0–1	Trinidad and Tobago

Estadio Cuscatlán, San Salvador
Referee: D. Brumitt (Canada)
25 May 1988

United States	4–1	El Salvador

Referee: E. Codesal (Mexico)

Note: The match between Trinidad and Tobago and El Salvador scheduled for 29 May 1988 was scratched by mutual agreement between the two countries.

=== Group B ===
Pos	Team	Pld	W	D	L	GF	GA	GD	Pts	Qualification
1	Mexico	4	4	0	0	16	1	+15	8	Disqualified
2	Guatemala	4	2	0	2	10	5	+5	4	Qualification to 1988 Summer Olympics
3	Guyana	4	0	0	4	0	20	−20	0	

Source: CONCACAF
18 October 1987

Guatemala	6–0	Guyana

Estadio del Ejército, Guatemala City
Referee: R . Osborne (Bermuda)
25 October 1987

Guyana	0–3	Guatemala

Estadio del Ejército, Guatemala City
Referee: G. Arrowsmith (Canada)
2 December 1987

Guyana	0–9	Mexico

Santa Ana Stadium, Santa Ana
Referee: F. Fuksman (United States)
9 December 1987

Mexico	2–0 Awarded	Guyana
	w/o

3 February 1988

Mexico	2–1	Guatemala

Estadio Nemesio Díez, Toluca
Referee: L. Sirjuesingh (Trinidad and Tobago)
14 February 1988

Guatemala	0–3	Mexico

Estadio del Ejército, Guatemala City
Referee: O. Brea Ramos (Cuba)

Notes

- The match between Mexico and Guyana, scheduled for 9 December 1987, was abandoned after fifteen members of the Guyanese squad defected and asked for political asylum while on a training camp in California, leaving them unable to field a team for the match. Mexico were awarded a 2–0 victory by CONCACAF.
- As Mexico were disqualified after their federation received a two-year suspension by FIFA, Guatemala took their place in the final tournament.
