= Football at the 1996 Summer Olympics – Men's qualification (CONCACAF–OFC play-off) =

CONCACAF–OFC play-off for the 1996 Summer Olympics
- Event: Football at the 1996 Summer Olympics – Men's qualification
Canada	Australia
(Canada)	(Australia)
2	7

First leg
Canada	Australia
2	2
- Date: 26 May 1996
- Venue: Commonwealth Stadium, Edmonton
- Referee: Kim Milton Nielsen (Denmark)
- Attendance: 13,049

Second leg
Australia	Canada
5	0
- Date: 2 June 1996
- Venue: Sydney Football Stadium, Sydney
- Referee: Ali Bujsaim (United Arab Emirates)
- Attendance: 25,809

The CONCACAF–OFC play-off for the 1996 Summer Olympics was a men's under-23 international football play-off between a team from CONCACAF (North, Central America and Caribbean) and a team from OFC (Oceania), with the winner qualifying for the final berth in the Men's Football Tournament at the 1996 Summer Olympics.

Australia qualified to the Olympics with a 7–2 aggregate win over Canada, after a 2–2 draw in the first leg and a 5–0 win in the second leg.

== Qualified teams ==
Country	Confederation	Qualified as
Canada	CONCACAF	1996 CONCACAF Men's Pre-Olympic Tournament runner-ups
Australia	OFC	1996 OFC Men's Olympic Qualifying Tournament winners

== Matches ==
=== First leg ===
26 May 1996

Canada	2–2	Australia
Xausa 21', 88'	Report	Lozanovski 31'; Spiteri 53'

Commonwealth Stadium, Edmonton
Attendance: 13,049
Referee: Kim Milton Nielsen (Denmark)

=== Second leg ===
2 June 1996

Australia	5–0	Canada
Foxe 16'; Lozanovski 58'; Viduka 82'; Agostino 85'; Muscat 87'	Report

Sydney Football Stadium, Sydney
Attendance: 25,809
Referee: Ali Bujsaim (United Arab Emirates)

== Goalscorers ==
There were 9 goals scored in 2 matches, for an average of 4.5 goals per match.

2 goals

- (Australia) Goran Lozanovski
- (Canada) Davide Xausa

1 goal

- (Australia) Paul Agostino
- (Australia) Hayden Foxe
- (Australia) Kevin Muscat
- (Australia) Joe Spiteri
- (Australia) Mark Viduka
