= 1988 CONCACAF Pre-Olympic Tournament qualification =

North American football tournament

The qualifying competition for the 1988 CONCACAF Pre-Olympic Tournament determined the three teams for the final tournament.

== First round ==
The winners from Group A would qualify for the second round. The Group B, and Group C winners would qualify for the final round automatically.

=== Group A ===
25 January 1987

Bahamas	1–3	Guyana

Thomas Robinson Stadium, Nassau
Referee: R. Hernandez C. (Puerto Rico)
22 February 1987

Guyana	3–0	Bahamas

Georgetown Cricket Club Ground "Bourda", Georgetown
Referee: R. Ramcharan (Trinidad and Tobago)

26 April 1987

Antigua and Barbuda	1–1	Dominican Republic

Antigua Recreation Ground, St. John's
Referee: R. Ramcharan (Trinidad and Tobago)
3 May 1987

Dominican Republic	0–0	Antigua and Barbuda

Estadio Olímpico Félix Sánchez, Santo Domingo
Referee: W.J. Campbell (Jamaica)

22 March 1987

Barbados	0–0	Jamaica

Barbados National Stadium, St. Michael
Referee: G.N. Laurie (Guyana)
5 April 1987

Jamaica	0–1	Barbados

Independence Park, Kingston
Referee: O. Brea Ramos (Cuba)

Notes

- Surinam were originally drawn against Trinidad and Tobago but withdrew from the competition. Trinidad and Tobago received a bye to the second round

=== Group B ===
23 May 1987

Canada	2–0	United States

Canada Games Stadium, Saint John, New Brunswick
Referee: A. Cliff (Bermuda)
30 May 1987

United States	3–0	Canada

West Community Stadium, Fenton
Referee: A. Brizio (Mexico)

1 April 1987

Bermuda	2–1	Mexico

Bermuda National Stadium, Hamilton
Referee: D. Perez Bouret (Dominican Republic)
24 May 1987

Mexico	6–0	Bermuda

Estadio Nemesio Díez, Toluca
Referee: E. Bellion (United States)

=== Group C ===
19 April 1987

Panama	1–1	El Salvador

Estadio Rommel Fernández, Panama City
Referee: Jose Chinchilla (Guatemala)
17 May 1987

El Salvador	3–2	Panama

Estadio Cuscatlán, San Salvador
Referee: Jorge Urias (Honduras)

17 May 1987

Honduras	1–2	Guatemala

Estadio Nacional Chelato Uclés, Tegucigalpa
Referee: B. Ulloa (Costa Rica)
31 May 1987

Guatemala	2–2	Honduras

Estadio Doroteo Guamuch Flores, Guatemala City
Referee: T. Herrera (El Salvador)

== Second round ==
31 May 1987

Guyana	4–0	Dominican Republic

Georgetown Cricket Club Ground "Bourda", Georgetown
Referee: J. Melville (Trinidad and Tobago)
7 June 1987

Dominican Republic	1–2	Guyana

Estadio Olímpico Félix Sánchez, Santo Domingo
Referee: O.T. Monson (Puerto Rico)

10 May 1987

Trinidad and Tobago	2–0	Barbados

Hasely Crawford Stadium, Port of Spain
Referee: B. Ulloa (Costa Rica)
24 May 1987

Barbados	1–1	Trinidad and Tobago

Barbados National Stadium, Bridgetown
Referee: H.A. Ignacio (Netherlands Antilles)
