= 1976 CONCACAF Pre-Olympic Tournament qualification =

North American football tournament

The qualifying competition for the 1976 CONCACAF Men's Pre-Olympic Tournament determined the three teams for the final tournament.

== Preliminary round ==
13 March 1975

Barbados	1–1	Trinidad and Tobago

Kensington Oval, Bridgetown
20 March 1975

Trinidad and Tobago	0–0	Barbados

Queen's Park Oval, Port of Spain
27 March 1975

Barbados	1–3	Trinidad and Tobago

Queen's Park Oval, Port of Spain

17 April 1975

El Salvador	4–0	Nicaragua

Estadio Jorge "Mágico" González, San Salvador
20 April 1975

Nicaragua	1–2	El Salvador

Estadio Jorge "Mágico" González, San Salvador

13 March 1975

Jamaica	1–0	Dominican Republic

Independence Park, Kingston
20 March 1975

Dominican Republic	1–3	Jamaica

Estadio Olímpico Félix Sánchez, Santo Domingo

== First round ==
20 April 1975

Bermuda	3–2	United States

Bermuda National Stadium, Hamilton
27 April 1975

United States	2–0	Bermuda

Balboa Park, San Francisco

27 July 1975

Costa Rica	1–0	El Salvador

Estadio Nacional de Costa Rica, San José
3 August 1975

El Salvador	1–2	Costa Rica

Estadio Jorge "Mágico" González, San Salvador

20 April 1975

Cuba	1–0	Jamaica

Estadio Pedro Marrero, Habana
27 April 1975

Jamaica	1–0	Cuba

Independence Park, Kingston
5 May 1975

Cuba	4–1	Jamaica

Estadio Rommel Fernández, Panama City

20 April 1975

Honduras	0–0	Guatemala

Estadio Nacional Chelato Uclés, Tegucigalpa
27 April 1975

Guatemala	2–0	Honduras

Estadio Doroteo Guamuch Flores, Ciudad de Guatemala

20 April 1975

Suriname	2–0	Trinidad and Tobago

André Kamperveen Stadion, Paramaribo
27 April 1975

Trinidad and Tobago	1–0	Suriname

Queen's Park Oval, Port of Spain

== Second round ==
30 November 1975

Costa Rica	1–1	Guatemala

Estadio Nacional de Costa Rica, San José
7 December 1975

Guatemala	2–1	Costa Rica

Estadio Doroteo Guamuch Flores, Ciudad de Guatemala

25 August 1975

Mexico	8–0	United States

Estadio Nemesio Díez, Toluca
28 August 1975

United States	2–4	Mexico

Baynard Stadium, Wilmington, Delaware

25 August 1975

Suriname	0–1	Cuba

André Kamperveen Stadion, Paramaribo
28 August 1975

Cuba	6–1	Suriname

Estadio Pedro Marrero, Habana
