= CONCACAF Men's Olympic Qualifying Championship =

Qualification for the Summer Olympics

The CONCACAF Men's Olympic Qualifying Championship was an association football competition organized by CONCACAF as its continental qualifying tournament for the men's olympic teams from North America, Central America and the Caribbean, to determine the qualified teams for the Olympic football tournament. The olympic teams were represented by amateur players (1964–1988) and later by under-23 players since 1992. The tournament was held from 1964 to 2020.

On 16 September 2021, CONCACAF announced that the representatives at the 2024 Summer Olympic Games will qualify through the 2022 CONCACAF U-20 Championship. The two finalists at the U-20 tournament will qualify for the Olympics in 2024.

== Results ==
Ed.	Year	Hosts	Champions	Results	Runners-up	Third place	Results	Fourth place
Olympic teams (amateur)
1	1964	Mexico	Mexico	Round-Robin	Suriname	United States	Round-Robin	Panama
2	1968	North America	No champions were awarded, only qualified teams					
3	1972	North America	Mexico	Round-Robin	United States	Guatemala	Round-Robin	Jamaica
4	1976	North America	Mexico	Round-Robin	Guatemala	Cuba	Round-Robin	–
5	1980	North America	Costa Rica	Round-Robin	United States	Suriname	Round-Robin	–
6	1984	North America	Costa Rica	Round-Robin	Canada	Cuba	Round-Robin	–
7	1988	North America	No champions were awarded, only qualified teams					
Olympic teams (U-23)
8	1992	North America	United States	Round-Robin	Mexico	Canada	Round-Robin	Honduras
9	1996	Canada	Mexico	Round-Robin	Canada	Costa Rica	Round-Robin	Jamaica
10	2000	United States	Honduras	2–1	United States	Mexico	5–0	Guatemala
11	2004	Mexico	Mexico	1–0 (a.e.t.)	Costa Rica	Honduras	1–1 (4–3 p)	United States
12	2008	United States	Honduras	1–0 (a.e.t.)	United States	Canada	0–0 (5–3 p)	Guatemala
13	2012	United States	Mexico	2–1 (a.e.t.)	Honduras	El Salvador	–	Canada
14	2015	United States	Mexico	2–0	Honduras	United States	2–0	Canada
15	2020	Mexico	Mexico	1–1 (5–4 p)	Honduras	United States	–	Canada

== Performances ==
Team	Champions	Runners-up	Third place	Fourth place	Total
Mexico	8 (1964, 1972, 1976, 1996, 2004, 2012, 2015, 2020)	1 (1992)	1 (2000)	–	10
Honduras	2 (2000, 2008)	3 (2012, 2015, 2020)	1 (2004)	1 (1992)	7
Costa Rica	2 (1980, 1984)	1 (2004)	1 (1996)	–	4
United States	1 (1992)	4 (1972, 1980, 2000, 2008)	2 (2015, 2020)	–	7
Canada	–	2 (1984, 1996)	2 (1992, 2008)	3 (2012, 2015, 2021)	7
Guatemala	–	1 (1976)	1 (1972)	2 (2000, 2008)	4
Suriname	–	1 (1964)	1 (1980)	–	2
Cuba	–	–	2 (1976, 1984)	–	2
El Salvador	–	–	1 (2012)	–	1
Jamaica	–	–	–	2 (1972, 1996)	2
Panama	–	–	–	1 (1964)	1

== Top goalscorers ==
=== Top goalscorers by edition ===
1964

- (United States) Carl Gentile (4 goals)
- (Mexico) Aaron Padilla (4 goals)

1968

- (El Salvador) Juan Ramon Martinez (3 goals)

1972

- (Mexico) Leonard Cuellar (4 goals)
- (United States) Mike Seeray (4 goals)

1976

- (Mexico) Hugo Sanchez (4 goals)

1980

- (United States) Don Ebert (3 goals)
- (Costa Rica) Javier Jimenez (3 goals)

1984

- (Canada) Mike Sweeney (2 goals)

1988

- (United States) Brent Goulet (6 goals)

1992

- (United States) Steve Snow (8 goals)

1996

- (Costa Rica) Ronald Gomez (6 goals)

2000

- (United States) Chris Albright (2 goals)
- (United States) Josh Wolff (2 goals)
- (Mexico) Joaquin Beltran (2 goals)
- (Guatemala) Carlos Ruiz (2 goals)
- (Honduras) David Suazo (2 goals)

2004

- (United States) Alecko Eskandarian
- (United States) Bobby Convey
- (Honduras) Emil Martinez

2008

- (United States) Freddy Adu (4 goals)

2012

- (Mexico) Marco Fabian (5 goals)
- (Mexico) Alan Pulido (5 goals)

2015

- (Honduras) Alberth Elis (4 goals)
- (United States) Jerome Kiesewetter (4 goals)

2020

- (Mexico) Sebastián Córdova (4 goals)

=== Overall top goalscorers ===
Rank	Player	Country	Year(s)	U-23 Goals
1	Steve Snow	(United States) USA	1992	8
2	Brent Goulet	(United States) USA	1988	6
2	Ronald Gomez	Costa Rica	1996	6
4	Freddy Adu	(United States) USA	2008–2012	5
4	Marco Fabián	Mexico	2012	5
4	Alan Pulido	Mexico	2012	5
7	Carl Gentile	(United States) USA	1964	4
7	Aaron Padilla	Mexico	1964	4
7	Leonard Cuellar	Mexico	1972	4
7	Mike Seeray	(United States) USA	1972	4
7	Hugo Sanchez	Mexico	1976	4
7	Alecko Eskandarian	(United States) USA	2004	4
7	Bobby Convey	(United States) USA	2004	4
7	Emil Martínez	Honduras	2004	4
7	Joe Corona	(United States) USA	2012	4
7	Anthony Lozano	Honduras	2012–2015	4
7	Erick Torres	Mexico	2012–2015	4
7	Alberth Elis	Honduras	2015	4
7	Jerome Kiesewetter	(United States) USA	2015	4
7	Sebastián Córdova	Mexico	2020	4

== Olympic qualification by nation ==
As of 2024

Rank	Nation	OQ	Years qualified
1	United States	15	1904, 1924, 1928, 1936, 1948, 1952, 1956, 1972, 1984, 1988, 1992, 1996, 2000, 2008, 2024
2	Mexico	12	1928, 1948, 1964, 1968, 1972, 1976, 1992, 1996, 2004, 2012, 2016, 2020
3	Honduras	5	2000, 2008, 2012, 2016, 2020
4	Canada	3	1904, 1976, 1984
4	Costa Rica	3	1980, 1984, 2004
4	Guatemala	3	1968, 1976, 1988
7	Cuba	2	1976, 1980
8	El Salvador	1	1968
8	Dominican Republic	1	2024
8	Curaçao	1	1952

Curaçao have been expelled by IOC, but participant record is recognized by FIFA.

== See also ==
- CONCACAF
- CONCACAF Under-20 Championship
- CONCACAF Under-17 World Cup Qualification
- CONCACAF Boys' Under-15 Championship
