= Richard McCallum (footballer) =

Jamaican footballer (born 1984)

Personal information
- Date of birth: 24 April 1984 (age 42)
- Position: Goalkeeper

Team information
- Current team: Waterhouse

Senior career*
Years	Team	Apps	(Gls)
2002–2003	Wadadah		
2003–2004	Invaders United		
2004–	Waterhouse		

International career^{‡}
1998 – 1999	Jamaica U17		
2000–2003	Jamaica U20		
2004	Jamaica U23		
2006–	Jamaica	8	(0)
- * Club domestic league appearances and goals as of 7 September 2011 ‡ National team caps and goals as of 7 September 2011

Richard McCallum (born 24 April 1984) is a Jamaican international footballer who plays for Waterhouse, as a goalkeeper.

== Career ==
=== Club ===
McCallum has played club football for Wadadah, Invaders United and Waterhouse. McCallum was named CHEC Player of the Month for April 2014.

=== International ===
He made his international debut for Jamaica in 2006. McCallum has also featured for Jamaica at under-17, under-20 and under-23 levels.
