= Keith Kelly (footballer) =

Jamaican footballer (born 1983)

Personal information
- Date of birth: 5 March 1983 (age 43)
- Place of birth: Port Royal, Jamaica
- Height: 1.76 m (5 ft 9 in)
- Position: Midfielder

Team information
- Current team: Greenbay Hoppers

Youth career
- 1997–1999: Port Royal FC
- 1999–2000: Harbour View

Senior career*
Years	Team	Apps	(Gls)
2000–2003	Paris Saint-Germain B	13	(3)
2002–2003	→ Mons (loan)	13	(0)
2003–2005	Arnett Gardens		
2005–2007	San Juan Jabloteh	3+	(0+)
2007–2010	Harbour View		
2010–2013	Sporting Central Academy	47	(3)
2013–2014	Harbour View	22	(1)
2014–	Greenbay Hoppers		

International career
- Jamaica U17
- Jamaica U20
2000–2005	Jamaica	9	(0)
- * Club domestic league appearances and goals as of 26 March 2020

Keith Kelly (born 5 March 1983) is a Jamaican professional footballer who plays as a midfielder for Antiguan club Greenbay Hoppers. Between 2000 and 2005 he made nine appearances for the Jamaica national team.

== Club career ==
A midfielder, Kelly was once regarded as one of the brightest Jamaican talents. He played at the 1999 FIFA U-17 World Championship and caught the eye of French giants Paris St Germain. He also played in the 2001 FIFA World Youth Championship. However, he never made the grade at PSG and was loaned out to Belgian side Mons before returning to Jamaica in 2003. After a several month battle over his contract rights, Kelly finally signed a contract to play for Arnett Gardens. His time at Arnett Gardens was marked by poor fitness and motivation but he was able to earn a few national team caps during his time. In 2005, it was rumored that Kelly would return to Harbour View as a replacement for Jermaine Hue, however it did not materialize. He then picked up a severe injury while playing for Trinidadian outfit CL Financial San Juan Jabloteh in November 2005 and after almost two years in the wilderness with a broken foot, Kelly returned to Jamaican football with Harbour View in summer 2007. In January 2011, Kelly moved to Sporting Central Academy in Clarendon. Kelly returned to Harbour View ahead of the 2013–14 season.

== International career ==
Kelly led Jamaica to appearances in the 1999 U-17 World Cup in New Zealand and the 2001 U-20 World Cup in Argentina. He made his senior debut for Jamaica in a November 2001 World Cup qualifying match against Costa Rica. He has collected ten more caps since, his last international match being a February 2005 CONCACAF Gold Cup qualifying game against Barbados.

== Honours ==
Jamaica

- Caribbean Cup: 2005

Harbour View

- Digicel Premier League: 2010
