= Leonardo Araya =

Costa Rican footballer (born 1982)

Leonardo Araya (born 15 February 1982) is a Costa Rican former footballer who played as a defender. He was a member of the Costa Rica national squad that competed at the 2004 Olympic men's football tournament.
