= Víctor Miranda =

Panamanian footballer (born 1982)

Personal information
- Full name: Victor Manuel Miranda
- Date of birth: July 27, 1982 (age 44)
- Place of birth: La Chorrera, Panama
- Height: 1.75 m (5 ft 9 in)
- Position: Defender

Senior career*
Years	Team	Apps	(Gls)
2000	Pan de Azúcar		
2001–2004	San Francisco		
2005	Árabe Unido		
2007	Tauro	10	(0)
2007–2008	UCR		
2008	Sporting San Miguelito		
2009–2010	Alianza		

International career^{‡}
2001–2005	Panama	17	(0)
- * Club domestic league appearances and goals ‡ National team caps and goals as of 10 June 2015

Víctor Manuel Miranda (born 27 July 1982) is a Panamanian football defender.

== Club career ==
Miranda played 10 matches for Universidad Costa Rica in the Primera Division de Costa Rica in the 2007-08 season.

He was released by Alianza in summer 2010.

== International career ==
Miranda played for the Panama U-23 squad during qualifying for the 2004 Olympics.

Miranda has made 17 appearances for the full Panama national football team, including six qualifying matches for the 2006 FIFA World Cup. He made his debut in a friendly against Trinidad and Tobago on June 10, 2001.

His final international was a January 2005 friendly match against Ecuador.
