= 1976 CONCACAF Pre-Olympic Tournament =

North American football tournament

Tournament details
- Dates: 1–11 March
- Teams: 3 (from 1 confederation)

Final positions
- Champions: Mexico (3rd title)
- Runners-up: Guatemala
- Third place: Cuba

Tournament statistics
- Matches played: 6
- Top scorer(s): (Mexico) Hugo Sánchez (4 goals)

The 1976 CONCACAF Pre-Olympic Tournament was the fourth edition of the CONCACAF Pre-Olympic Tournament, the quadrennial, international football tournament organised by the CONCACAF to determine which national teams from the North, Central America and Caribbean region qualify for the Olympic football tournament.

Mexico successfully defended their title, and qualified for the 1976 Summer Olympics together with runners-up Guatemala and the host nation, Canada, as representatives of CONCACAF. Cuba was invited after the withdrawal of Uruguay, the refusal of Argentina and Colombia to replace them.

== Qualification ==
The three berths were allocated as follows:

- The four winners from the second round

=== Qualified teams ===
The following teams qualified for the final tournament.

Zone	Country	Method of qualification	Appearance^{1}	Last appearance	Previous best performance	Previous Olympic appearances (last)
North America	Mexico (title holders)	Second round winners	3rd	1972	Winners (1964, 1972)	5 (1972)
Central America	Guatemala	Second round winners	3rd	1972	Final round winner without outright champions (1968)	1 (1968)
Caribbean	Cuba	Second round winners	1st	0 (debut)	Debutant	0

^{1} Only final tournament.

== Final round ==
Pos	Team	Pld	W	D	L	GF	GA	GD	Pts	Qualification
1	Mexico (C)	4	2	1	1	11	7	+4	5	Qualification to 1976 Summer Olympics
2	Guatemala	4	1	2	1	6	8	−2	4	Qualification to 1976 Summer Olympics
3	Cuba	4	0	3	1	5	7	−2	3	Qualification to 1976 Summer Olympics

Source: RSSSF
(C) Champions
1 March 1976

Mexico	4–1	Guatemala

Estadio Nemesio Díez, Toluca
3 March 1976

Mexico	4–2	Cuba

Toluca

5 March 1976

Guatemala	3–2	Mexico

Estadio Doroteo Guamuch Flores, Guatemala City
7 March 1976

Guatemala	1–1	Cuba

Estadio Doroteo Guamuch Flores, Guatemala City

9 March 1976

Cuba	1–1	Mexico

Estadio Latinoamericano, Havana
11 March 1976

Cuba	1–1	Guatemala

Estadio Latinoamericano, Havana

== Qualified teams for the Summer Olympics ==
The following four teams from CONCACAF qualified for the 1976 Summer Olympics, including Canada which qualified as the hosts.

Team	Qualified on	Previous appearances in the Summer Olympics^{2}
Canada	12 May 1970	1 (1904)
Mexico	11 March 1976	5 (1928, 1948, 1964, 1968, 1972)
Guatemala	11 March 1976	1 (1968)
Cuba	July 1976	0 (debut)

^{2} Bold indicates champions for that year. Italic indicates hosts for that year.
