= Mike Seerey =

American soccer player

Personal information
- Full name: Michael Kevin Seerey
- Date of birth: October 23, 1950 (age 76)
- Place of birth: St. Louis, Missouri, United States
- Height: 6 ft 0 in (1.83 m)
- Position: Forward

College career
Years	Team	Apps	(Gls)
1969–1972	Saint Louis Billikens		

Senior career*
Years	Team	Apps	(Gls)
1973	Miami Toros	14	(3)
1974–1976	St. Louis Stars	42	(1)
- * Club domestic league appearances and goals

Mike Seerey (born October 23, 1950, in St. Louis, Missouri) is a former U.S. soccer forward, and a two-time recipient of the Hermann Trophy as the outstanding collegiate soccer player of the year. He played four seasons in the North American Soccer League and was a member of the U.S. soccer team at the 1972 Summer Olympics.

== Youth ==
Seerey was a standout U.S. collegiate soccer player at St. Louis University where he starred for the school's men's soccer team from 1969 to 1972. During his four years with the Billikens, the team won the NCAA championship three times. In 1971, Seerey was a first team All American. He also won the Hermann Trophy as the top collegiate player of the year. Ironically, he was named the NCAA Tournament's Offensive MVP although this was the only year St. Louis did not win the championship during Seerey's four seasons. Seerey repeated as the Hermann Trophy winner in 1972, making him the second two-time winner after fellow St. Louis teammate Al Trost. However, he was not named to the All American list his senior year. As of 2007, he is ranked fourth on the season points list at St. Louis with 55 in the 1971 season.

== Olympics ==
In addition to playing collegiate soccer, Seerey was also a member of the 1972 U.S. Olympic soccer team. He began playing with the Olympic team while in 1971 while still in college. That year, the team went 3–2–2 in first-round qualifications. In 1972, the U.S. qualified for its first Olympics in twelve years. Seerey scored two goals in a 2–0 victory over Guatemala and another two goals in a 2–2 tie with Mexico. The U.S. finished the second-round qualifications with a 2-1-3 record and a berth in the 1972 Summer Olympics. Seerey started and played all 90 minutes in the first two U.S. games at the Olympics. In the first game, the U.S. held Morocco scoreless in a 0–0 tie. However, the next game brought the team back to Earth as Malaysia easily won 3–0. The U.S. coach sent out his reserves for the last game against host West Germany and Seerey watched his teammates get humbled 7–0.

== Professional ==
After the Olympics, Seerey turned pro with the Miami Toros of the North American Soccer League (NASL). The Toros selected him in the first round (second overall) of the 1973 NASL draft. He played 14 games and scored 3 goals, adding 4 assists. The next year, he moved to the Saint Louis Stars, also of the NASL, where he played for the next three years. He never found his scoring touch with the Stars and when he retired from the NASL after the 1976 season, he had only scored 1 goal in 43 games with that team.
