= 1980 CONCACAF Pre-Olympic Tournament =

North American football tournament

Tournament details
- Dates: 12 March – 2 April
- Teams: 3 (from 1 confederation)

Final positions
- Champions: Costa Rica (1st title)
- Runners-up: United States
- Third place: Suriname

Tournament statistics
- Matches played: 6
- Top scorer(s): (Costa Rica) Javier Jiménez (United States) Don Ebert (3 goals each)

The 1980 CONCACAF Pre-Olympic Tournament was the fifth edition of the CONCACAF Pre-Olympic Tournament, the quadrennial, international football tournament organised by the CONCACAF to determine which national teams from the North, Central America and Caribbean region qualify for the Olympic football tournament.

The top two teams, champions, Costa Rica and the United States, qualified for the 1980 Summer Olympics. However, the United States boycotted the Olympic games and they were replaced by Cuba.

== Qualification ==
The three berths were allocated as follows:

- The three winners from their respective regional zone at the qualifying stage

=== Qualified teams ===
The following teams qualified for the final tournament.

Zone	Country	Method of qualification	Appearance^{1}	Last appearance	Previous best performance	Previous Olympic appearances (last)
North America	United States	Second round winners	3rd	1972	Runners-up (1972)	
Central America	Costa Rica	Second round winners	2nd	1968	Final round (1968)	
Caribbean	Suriname	Third round winners	2nd	1964	Runners-up (1964)	

^{1} Only final tournament.

== Final round ==
Pos	Team	Pld	W	D	L	GF	GA	GD	Pts	Qualification
1	Costa Rica (C)	4	2	1	1	11	7	+4	5	Qualification to 1980 Summer Olympics
2	United States	4	2	1	1	6	8	−2	5	
3	Suriname	4	1	0	3	5	7	−2	2	

Source: RSSSF
(C) Champions
12 March 1980

Costa Rica	3–2	Suriname

Estadio Nacional de Costa Rica, San José
16 March 1980

United States	2–1	Suriname

Camping World Stadium, Orlando, Florida
20 March 1980

Costa Rica	0–1	United States

Estadio Nacional de Costa Rica, San José
25 March 1980

United States	1–1	Costa Rica

Cougar Softball Field, Edwardsville, Illinois
30 March 1980

Suriname	2–3	Costa Rica

André Kamperveen Stadion, Paramaribo
2 April 1980

Suriname	4–2	United States

André Kamperveen Stadion, Paramaribo

== Qualified teams for the Summer Olympics ==
The following four teams from CONCACAF qualified for the 1980 Summer Olympics.

Team	Qualified on	Previous appearances in the Summer Olympics^{1}
Costa Rica	Winner of the final tournament	
Cuba	Replaced the United States	

^{1} Bold indicates champions for that year. Italic indicates hosts for that year.
