= 1972 CONCACAF Pre-Olympic Tournament =

North American football tournament

Tournament details
- Dates: 16 January – 14 May
- Teams: 4 (from 1 confederation)

Final positions
- Champions: Mexico (2nd title)
- Runners-up: United States

Tournament statistics
- Matches played: 12
- Top scorer(s): (Mexico) Leonardo Cuéllar (United States) Mike Seerey (4 goals each)

The 1972 CONCACAF Pre-Olympic Tournament was the third edition of the CONCACAF Pre-Olympic Tournament, the quadrennial, international football tournament organised by the CONCACAF to determine which national teams from the North, Central America and Caribbean region qualify for the Olympic football tournament.

Mexico, won their second title, and qualified for the 1972 Summer Olympics together with runners-up United States as CONCACAF representatives.

== Qualification ==
=== Qualified teams ===
The following teams qualified for the final tournament.

Zone	Country	Method of qualification	Appearance^{1}	Last appearance	Previous best performance	Previous Olympic appearances (last)
North America	Mexico	First round winners	2nd	1964	Winners (1964)	4 (1968)
North America	United States	First round winners	2nd	1964	Third place (1964)	7 (1956)
Central America	Guatemala	First round winners	2nd	1968	Final round winner without outright champions (1968)	1 (1968)
Caribbean	Jamaica	First round winners	1st	0 (debut)	Debutant	0

^{1} Only final tournament.

== Final round ==
Pos	Team	Pld	W	D	L	GF	GA	GD	Pts	Qualification
1	Mexico (C)	6	3	2	1	12	6	+6	8	Qualification to 1972 Summer Olympics
2	United States	6	2	3	1	10	9	+1	7	Qualification to 1972 Summer Olympics
3	Guatemala	6	2	1	3	3	7	−4	5	
4	Jamaica	6	1	2	3	3	8	−5	4	

Source: RSSSF
(C) Champions
16 January 1972

Guatemala	1–2	Mexico

Estadio Doroteo Guamuch Flores, Ciudad de Guatemala
16 January 1972

Jamaica	1–1	United States

Independence Park, Kingston

23 January 1972

Mexico	1–1	United States

Estadio Jalisco, Guadalajara
9 April 1972

Guatemala	1–0	Jamaica

Estadio Doroteo Guamuch Flores, Ciudad de Guatemala

13 April 1972

Mexico	4–0	Jamaica

Estadio Olímpico Universitario, Ciudad de México
16 April 1972

Guatemala	3–2	United States

Estadio Doroteo Guamuch Flores, Ciudad de Guatemala

25 April 1972

United States	2–1	Guatemala

Hialeah Stadium, Hialeah
29 April 1972

Jamaica	0–0	Guatemala

Independence Park, Kingston

7 May 1972

Jamaica	1–0	Mexico

Independence Park, Kingston
10 May 1972

United States	2–2	Mexico

Kezar Stadium, San Francisco

14 May 1972

Mexico	3–1	Guatemala

Estadio Nemesio Díez, Toluca
14 May 1972

United States	2–1	Jamaica

West Community Stadium, Fenton

== Qualified teams for Summer Olympics ==
The following two teams from CONCACAF qualified for the 1972 Summer Olympics.

Team	Qualified on	Previous appearances in Summer Olympics^{2}
Mexico	14 May 1972	4 (1928, 1948, 1964, 1968)
United States	14 May 1972	7 (1904, 1924, 1928, 1936, 1948, 1952, 1956)

^{2} Bold indicates champions for that year. Italic indicates hosts for that year.
