= Jamaica national under-23 football team =

Jamaica U-23
- Association: Jamaica Football Federation
- Confederation: CONCACAF (North America)
- Sub-confederation: CFU (Caribbean)
- Head coach: Heimir Hallgrimsson

The Jamaica national under-23 football team (also known as Jamaica under-23, Jamaica U23) represents Jamaica in international football competitions during and Pan American Games. The selection is limited to players under the age of 23, The team is controlled by the Jamaica Football Federation (JFF). The team took part in preliminary matches, it has never qualified for the final stages of an Olympic football tournament.

== Results and fixtures ==
Legend

Win Draw Lose Void or Postponed Fixture

== See also ==
- Sport in Jamaica
  - Football in Jamaica
    - Women's football in Jamaica
- Jamaica national football team
- Jamaica national under-20 football team
- Jamaica national under-17 football team
- Jamaica national beach soccer team
- Jamaica women's national football team
