= Football at the 2020 Summer Olympics – Men's tournament – Group B =

Football at the Olympics

Group B of the men's football tournament at the 2020 Summer Olympics was played from 22 to 28 July 2021 in Kashima's Kashima Stadium, Sapporo's Sapporo Dome and Yokohama's International Stadium Yokohama. The group consistsed of Honduras, New Zealand, Romania and South Korea. The top two teams, South Korea and New Zealand, advanced to the knockout stage.

== Teams ==
Draw position	Team	Pot	Confederation	Method of qualification	Date of qualification	Olympic appearance	Last appearance	Previous best performance
B1	New Zealand	3	OFC	2019 OFC Men's Olympic Qualifying Tournament champions	5 October 2019	3rd	2012	14th place (2008)
B2	South Korea	1	AFC	2020 AFC U-23 Championship champions	26 January 2020	11th	2016	Bronze medalists (2012)
B3	Honduras	2	CONCACAF	2020 CONCACAF Men's Olympic Qualifying Championship runners-up	30 March 2021	5th	2016	Fourth place (2016)
B4	Romania	4	UEFA	2019 UEFA European Under-21 Championship semi-finalists	27 June 2019	4th	1964	Fifth place (1964)

== Standings ==
Pos	Team	Pld	W	D	L	GF	GA	GD	Pts	Qualification
1	South Korea	3	2	0	1	10	1	+9	6	Advance to knockout stage
2	New Zealand	3	1	1	1	3	3	0	4	Advance to knockout stage
3	Romania	3	1	1	1	1	4	−3	4	
4	Honduras	3	1	0	2	3	9	−6	3	

Source: TOCOG and FIFA
Rules for classification: Group stage tiebreakers

In the quarter-finals,

- The winners of Group B, South Korea, advanced to play the runners-up of Group A, Mexico.
- The runners-up of Group B, New Zealand, advanced to play the winners of Group A, Japan.

== Matches ==
=== New Zealand vs South Korea ===
22 July 2021
17:00

New Zealand	1–0	South Korea
Wood 70'	Report (TOCOG); Report (FIFA)

Kashima Stadium, Kashima
Referee: Victor Gomes (South Africa)

New Zealand	South Korea

GK	1	Michael Woud
CB	16	Gianni Stensness
CB	2	Winston Reid (c)
CB	4	Nando Pijnaker
RM	15	Dane Ingham
CM	8	Joe Bell
CM	6	Clayton Lewis	(yellow card) 78'	(substituted off) 90+4'
LM	3	Liberato Cacace
RF	7	Elijah Just		(substituted off) 71'
CF	9	Chris Wood
LF	12	Callum McCowatt		(substituted off) 85'
Substitutions:
FW	18	Ben Waine		(substituted on) 71'
MF	10	Marko Stamenic		(substituted on) 85'
DF	17	Callan Elliot		(substituted on) 90+4'
Head coach:
Danny Hay

GK	1	Song Bum-keun
RB	2	Lee You-hyeon
CB	5	Jeong Tae-uk
CB	20	Lee Sang-min (c)
LB	19	Kang Yoon-sung	(substituted off) 87'
CM	15	Won Du-jae
CM	14	Kim Dong-hyun	(substituted off) 78'
RW	17	Um Won-sang	(substituted off) 59'
AM	8	Lee Kang-in	(substituted off) 59'
LW	7	Kwon Chang-hoon	(substituted off) 59'
CF	16	Hwang Ui-jo
Substitutions:
FW	11	Lee Dong-jun	(substituted on) 59'
MF	10	Lee Dong-gyeong	(substituted on) 59'
FW	9	Song Min-kyu	(substituted on) 59'
FW	6	Jeong Seung-won	(substituted on) 78'
DF	4	Park Ji-soo	(substituted on) 87'
Head coach:
Kim Hak-bum

Assistant referees:
Arsenio Marengula (Mozambique)
Souru Phatsoane (Lesotho)
Fourth official:
Artur Soares Dias (Portugal)
Video assistant referee:
Benoît Millot (France)
Assistant video assistant referee:
Guillermo Cuadra Fernández (Spain)

=== Honduras vs Romania ===
22 July 2021
20:00

Honduras	0–1	Romania
	Report (TOCOG); Report (FIFA)	Oliva 45+1' (o.g.)

Kashima Stadium, Kashima
Referee: Leodán González (Uruguay)

Honduras	Romania

GK	1	Alex Güity		(substituted off) 46'
CB	16	José García
CB	20	Jorge Álvarez	(yellow card) 48'
CB	2	Denil Maldonado (c)		(substituted off) 88'
RWB	21	Elvin Oliva	(yellow card) 26'	(substituted off) 88'
LWB	3	Wesly Decas
CM	10	Rigoberto Rivas		(substituted off) 57'
CM	15	Carlos Pineda
CM	8	Edwin Rodríguez		(substituted off) 57'
CF	19	Douglas Martínez
CF	9	Jorge Benguché
Substitutions:
GK	12	Michael Perreló		(substituted on) 46'
FW	17	Luis Palma		(substituted on) 57'
MF	7	José Alejandro Reyes		(substituted on) 57'
DF	4	Carlos Meléndez		(substituted on) 88'
DF	5	Cristopher Meléndez		(substituted on) 88'
Head coach:
(Uruguay) Miguel Falero

GK	12	Mihai Aioani
RB	18	Marco Dulca	(yellow card) 71'
CB	4	Alex Pașcanu
CB	6	Virgil Ghiță
LB	3	Florin Ștefan		(substituted off) 46'
DM	8	Marius Marin (c)
RM	14	Andrei Rațiu		(substituted off) 75'
CM	10	Andrei Ciobanu		(substituted off) 69'
LM	11	Valentin Gheorghe		(substituted off) 55'
CF	20	Alex Dobre	(yellow card) 44'
CF	9	George Ganea		(substituted off) 68'
Substitutions:
DF	2	Radu Boboc		(substituted on) 46'
FW	21	Antonio Sefer		(substituted on) 55'
MF	19	Andrei Sîntean	(yellow card) 82'	(substituted on) 68'
MF	5	Tudor Băluță		(substituted on) 69'
DF	17	Ricardo Grigore		(substituted on) 75'
Head coach:
Mirel Rădoi

Assistant referees:
Nicolás Taran (Uruguay)
Richard Trinidad (Uruguay)
Fourth official:
Ismail Elfath (United States)
Video assistant referee:
Andrés Cunha (Uruguay)
Assistant video assistant referee:
Bibiana Steinhaus (Germany)

=== New Zealand vs Honduras ===
25 July 2021
17:00

New Zealand	2–3	Honduras
Cacace 10'; Wood 49'	Report (TOCOG); Report (FIFA)	Palma 45+1'; Obregón 78'; Rivas 87'

Kashima Stadium, Kashima
Referee: Orel Grinfeld (Israel)

New Zealand	Honduras

GK	1	Michael Woud
CB	16	Gianni Stensness
CB	2	Winston Reid (c)		(substituted off) 6'
CB	4	Nando Pijnaker
RM	15	Dane Ingham
CM	8	Joe Bell
CM	6	Clayton Lewis		(substituted off) 65'
LM	3	Liberato Cacace
RF	7	Elijah Just		(substituted off) 86'
CF	9	Chris Wood
LF	12	Callum McCowatt		(substituted off) 65'
Substitutions:
DF	14	George Stanger		(substituted on) 6'
MF	10	Marko Stamenic	(yellow card) 86'	(substituted on) 65'
FW	18	Ben Waine	(yellow card) 75'	(substituted on) 65'
FW	11	Joe Champness		(substituted on) 86'
Head coach:
Danny Hay

GK	1	Alex Güity
RB	5	Cristopher Meléndez		(substituted off) 63'
CB	16	José García
CB	2	Denil Maldonado (c)		(substituted off) 63'
LB	3	Wesly Decas	(yellow card) 37'
DM	20	Jorge Álvarez		(substituted off) 63'
RM	8	Edwin Rodríguez
LM	17	Luis Palma
AM	7	José Alejandro Reyes
CF	19	Douglas Martínez		(substituted off) 71'
CF	9	Jorge Benguché		(substituted off) 46'
Substitutions:
MF	15	Carlos Pineda		(substituted on) 46'
DF	21	Elvin Oliva		(substituted on) 63'
FW	10	Rigoberto Rivas		(substituted on) 63'
DF	4	Carlos Meléndez		(substituted on) 63'
FW	18	Juan Obregón		(substituted on) 71'
Head coach:
(Uruguay) Miguel Falero

Assistant referees:
Roy Hassan (Israel)
Idan Yarkoni (Israel)
Fourth official:
Chris Beath (Australia)
Video assistant referee:
Roi Reinshreiber (Israel)
Assistant video assistant referee:
Benoît Millot (France)

=== Romania vs South Korea ===
25 July 2021
20:00

Romania	0–4	South Korea
	Report (TOCOG); Report (FIFA)	Marin 27' (o.g.); Um Won-sang 59'; Lee Kang-in 84' (pen.), 90'

Kashima Stadium, Kashima
Referee: Jesús Valenzuela (Venezuela)

Romania	South Korea

GK	12	Mihai Aioani
RB	2	Radu Boboc		(substituted off) 56'
CB	4	Alex Pașcanu	(yellow card) 67'
CB	6	Virgil Ghiță
LB	18	Marco Dulca		(substituted off) 77'
DM	8	Marius Marin (c)
RM	21	Antonio Sefer		(substituted off) 64'
CM	10	Andrei Ciobanu		(substituted off) 76'
LM	7	Ion Gheorghe	(yellow card) 25' (yellow-red card) 45+1'
CF	20	Alex Dobre
CF	9	George Ganea		(substituted off) 56'
Substitutions:
MF	19	Andrei Sîntean		(substituted on) 56'
FW	11	Valentin Gheorghe		(substituted on) 56'
DF	17	Ricardo Grigore		(substituted on) 64'
FW	13	Eduard Florescu		(substituted on) 76'
MF	5	Tudor Băluță		(substituted on) 77'
Head coach:
Mirel Rădoi

GK	1	Song Bum-keun
RB	6	Jeong Seung-won	(yellow card) 9'	(substituted off) 46'
CB	5	Jeong Tae-uk (c)
CB	4	Park Ji-soo
LB	15	Won Du-jae
CM	12	Seol Young-woo
CM	19	Kang Yoon-sung
RW	17	Um Won-sang		(substituted off) 90+1'
AM	10	Lee Dong-gyeong		(substituted off) 78'
LW	11	Lee Dong-jun		(substituted off) 65'
CF	16	Hwang Ui-jo		(substituted off) 79'
Substitutions:
FW	7	Kwon Chang-hoon		(substituted on) 46'
FW	9	Song Min-kyu		(substituted on) 65'
MF	21	Kim Jin-kyu		(substituted on) 78'
MF	8	Lee Kang-in		(substituted on) 79'
DF	3	Kim Jae-woo		(substituted on) 90+1'
Head coach:
Kim Hak-bum

Assistant referees:
Tulio Moreno (Venezuela)
Lubin Torrealba (Venezuela)
Fourth official:
Iván Barton (El Salvador)
Video assistant referee:
Mauro Vigliano (Argentina)
Assistant video assistant referee:
Wagner Reway (Brazil)

=== Romania vs New Zealand ===
28 July 2021
17:30

Romania	0–0	New Zealand
	Report (TOCOG); Report (FIFA)

Sapporo Dome, Sapporo
Referee: Kevin Ortega (Peru)

Romania	New Zealand

GK	12	Mihai Aioani
CB	17	Ricardo Grigore
CB	15	Andrei Chindriș	(yellow card) 28'	(substituted off) 78'
CB	6	Virgil Ghiță
RM	14	Andrei Rațiu
CM	8	Marius Marin (c)
CM	18	Marco Dulca	(yellow card) 30'	(substituted off) 78'
LM	3	Florin Ștefan
AM	19	Andrei Sîntean		(substituted off) 59'
CF	20	Alex Dobre		(substituted off) 78'
CF	13	Eduard Florescu		(substituted off) 87'
Substitutions:
FW	9	George Ganea		(substituted on) 59'
MF	10	Andrei Ciobanu		(substituted on) 78'
MF	16	Ronaldo Deaconu		(substituted on) 78'
FW	11	Valentin Gheorghe		(substituted on) 78'
FW	21	Antonio Sefer		(substituted on) 87'
Head coach:
Mirel Rădoi

GK	1	Michael Woud
RB	17	Callan Elliot	(yellow card) 42'	(substituted off) 46'
CB	16	Gianni Stensness
CB	4	Nando Pijnaker
LB	3	Liberato Cacace
DM	8	Joe Bell
CM	19	Matthew Garbett	(yellow card) 21'	(substituted off) 72'
CM	10	Marko Stamenic	(yellow card) 89'
RW	7	Elijah Just
LW	11	Joe Champness		(substituted off) 46'
CF	9	Chris Wood (c)
Substitutions:
FW	12	Callum McCowatt		(substituted on) 46'
DF	15	Dane Ingham		(substituted on) 46'
MF	6	Clayton Lewis		(substituted on) 72'
Head coach:
Danny Hay

Assistant referees:
Michael Orué (Peru)
Jesús Sánchez (Peru)
Fourth official:
Hiroyuki Kimura (Japan)
Video assistant referee:
Andrés Cunha (Uruguay)
Assistant video assistant referee:
Erick Miranda (Mexico)

=== South Korea vs Honduras ===
28 July 2021
17:30

South Korea	6–0	Honduras
Hwang Ui-jo 12' (pen.), 45+5', 52' (pen.); Won Du-jae 19' (pen.); Kim Jin-ya 64'; Lee Kang-in 82'	Report (TOCOG); Report (FIFA)

International Stadium Yokohama, Yokohama
Referee: Georgi Kabakov (Bulgaria)

South Korea	Honduras

GK	1	Song Bum-keun
RB	12	Seol Young-woo
CB	5	Jeong Tae-uk (c)
CB	4	Park Ji-soo
LB	19	Kang Yoon-sung		(substituted off) 57'
DM	15	Won Du-jae		(substituted off) 72'
RM	7	Kwon Chang-hoon		(substituted off) 73'
CM	21	Kim Jin-gyu
LM	13	Kim Jin-ya
SS	11	Lee Dong-jun		(substituted off) 46'
CF	16	Hwang Ui-jo		(substituted off) 57'
Substitutions:
FW	17	Um Won-sang		(substituted on) 46'
DF	3	Kim Jae-woo		(substituted on) 57'
MF	8	Lee Kang-in	(yellow card) 65'	(substituted on) 57'
MF	14	Kim Dong-hyun		(substituted on) 72'
MF	10	Lee Dong-gyeong		(substituted on) 73'
Head coach:
Kim Hak-bum

GK	1	Alex Güity
CB	4	Carlos Meléndez	(yellow card) 17' (red card) 39'
CB	6	Jonathan Núñez	(yellow card) 27'
CB	2	Denil Maldonado (c)
RWB	21	Elvin Oliva
LWB	3	Wesly Decas
CM	7	José Alejandro Reyes
CM	15	Carlos Pineda		(substituted off) 46'
CM	17	Luis Palma		(substituted off) 43'
SS	8	Edwin Rodríguez		(substituted off) 70'
CF	19	Douglas Martínez		(substituted off) 46'
Substitutions:
DF	5	Cristopher Meléndez	(yellow card) 51'	(substituted on) 43'
FW	10	Rigoberto Rivas		(substituted on) 46'
MF	13	Brayan Moya		(substituted on) 46'
MF	20	Jorge Álvarez		(substituted on) 70'
Head coach:
(Uruguay) Miguel Falero

Assistant referees:
Diyan Valkov (Bulgaria)
Martin Margaritov (Bulgaria)
Fourth official:
Victor Gomes (South Africa)
Video assistant referee:
Adil Zourak (Morocco)
Assistant video assistant referee:
Abdulkadir Bitigen (Turkey)

== Discipline ==
Fair play points would have been used as a tiebreaker if the overall and head-to-head records of teams were tied. These were calculated based on yellow and red cards received in all group matches as follows:

- first yellow card: minus 1 point;
- indirect red card (second yellow card): minus 3 points;
- direct red card: minus 4 points;
- yellow card and direct red card: minus 5 points;

Only one of the above deductions is applied to a player in a single match.

Team	Match 1				Match 2				Match 3				Points
Team	Booked	(yellow card) (yellow-red card)	Sent off (straight red)	(yellow card) (red card)	Booked	(yellow card) (yellow-red card)	Sent off (straight red)	(yellow card) (red card)	Booked	(yellow card) (yellow-red card)	Sent off (straight red)	(yellow card) (red card)	Points
South Korea					1				1				−2
New Zealand	1				2				3				–6
Romania	3				1	1			2				–9
Honduras	2				1				3			1	–11
