= 2020 CONCACAF Men's Olympic Qualifying Championship =

North American football tournament

2020 CONCACAF Men's Olympic Qualifying
Tournament details
- Host country: Mexico
- Dates: 18–30 March 2021
- Teams: 8 (from 1 confederation)
- Venues: 2 (in 2 host cities)

Final positions
- Champions: Mexico (8th title)
- Runners-up: Honduras

Tournament statistics
- Matches played: 15
- Goals scored: 38 (2.53 per match)
- Top scorer: (Mexico) Sebastián Córdova (4 goals)
- Best player: (Mexico) Alexis Vega
- Best goalkeeper: (Honduras) Alex Güity
- Fair play award: Mexico

The 2020 CONCACAF Men's Olympic Qualifying Championship was the fifteenth and final edition of the CONCACAF Men's Olympic Qualifying, the quadrennial, international, age-restricted football tournament organised by CONCACAF to determine which men's under-23 national teams from the North, Central America and Caribbean region qualify for the Olympic football tournament.

In August 2019, it was announced that the tournament would be hosted in Guadalajara and Zapopan, both cities in the state of Jalisco, Mexico, with the tournament originally scheduled to take place between 20 March and 1 April 2020.

On 13 March 2020, CONCACAF suspended all upcoming competitions scheduled to take place over the next thirty days due to the COVID-19 pandemic in North America. On 14 January 2021, CONCACAF announced that the Men's Olympic Qualifiers would now take place between 18 and 30 March 2021, as the Olympics had been postponed to July 2021.

Host nation, Mexico successfully defended their title after defeating Honduras on penalties in the final. It was their eight Pre-Olympic title and third in a row, after previous wins in 1964, 1972, 1976, 1996, 2004, 2012 and 2015. As the top two teams, Mexico and Honduras both qualified for the 2020 Summer Olympics in Japan as the CONCACAF representatives, just as the same sides had in the previous two Summer Olympics.

On 16 September 2021, CONCACAF announced that the representatives at the 2024 Summer Olympic Games in France will qualify through the 2022 CONCACAF U-20 Championship.

== Qualification ==
The eight berths were allocated to the three regional zones as follows:

- Three teams from the North American Zone (NAFU), i.e., Canada, Mexico and United States, who all qualified automatically due to them being the only teams in the region
- Three teams from the Central American Zone (UNCAF)
- Two teams from the Caribbean Zone (CFU)

Regional qualification tournaments were held in Central America and Caribbean to determine the five teams joining Canada, Mexico, and the United States at the final tournament.

=== Qualified teams ===
The following teams qualified for the final tournament.

Zone	Country	Method of qualification	Appearance	Last appearance	Previous best performance	Previous Olympic appearances (last)
North America	Mexico (hosts & title holders)	Automatic	12th	2015	Winners (1964, 1972, 1976, 1996, 2004, 2012, 2015)	11 (2016)
North America	Canada	Automatic	9th	2015	Runners-up (1984, 1996)	3 (1984)
North America	United States	Automatic	11th	2015	Winners (1988, 1992)	14 (2008)
Central America	Costa Rica	Central America play-off winners	7th	2004	Winners (1980, 1984)	3 (2004)
Central America	El Salvador	Central America play-off winners	5th	2012	Final round winner without outright champions (1968)	1 (1968)
Central America	Honduras	Central America play-off winners	7th	2015	Winners (2000, 2008)	4 (2016)
Caribbean	Dominican Republic	Caribbean play-in round winners	1st	0 (debut)	Debutant	0
Caribbean	Haiti	Caribbean play-in round winners	3rd	2015	Group stage (2008, 2015)	0

== Venues ==
The matches were played in two stadiums in the following cities:

Guadalajara	Zapopan (Guadalajara Area)	Location of the 2020 CONCACAF Men's Olympic Qualifying Championship.
Estadio Jalisco	Estadio Akron	Location of the 2020 CONCACAF Men's Olympic Qualifying Championship.
Capacity: 55,110	Capacity: 49,850	Location of the 2020 CONCACAF Men's Olympic Qualifying Championship.

== Draw ==
The draw for the tournament took place on 9 January 2020, 19:00 CST (UTC−6) at the Estadio Akron, in Zapopan, Mexico.

The eight teams were drawn into two groups of four teams. The teams were seeded into four pots for the draw. Pot 1 contained Mexico, seeded in Group A as the host nation, and Honduras, seeded in Group B as the best performing team in the last editions among the other teams. Pot 2 contained the two remaining teams from North America, Canada and United States, Pot 3 contained the two remaining teams from Central America, Costa Rica and El Salvador, while Pot 4 contained the two teams from the Caribbean, Dominican Republic and Haiti.

Pot 1	Pot 2	Pot 3	Pot 4
Mexico (position A1); Honduras (position B1)	Canada; United States	Costa Rica; El Salvador	Dominican Republic; Haiti

== Squads ==
Players born on or after 1 January 1997 were eligible to compete in the tournament.

== Match officials ==
The match officials appointed for the 2020 CONCACAF Men's Olympic Qualifying Championship were announced by CONCACAF on 23 February 2021.

Referees

- (Costa Rica) Juan Gabriel Calderón
- (El Salvador) Iván Barton
- (Grenada) Reon Radix
- (Guatemala) Mario Escobar
- (Honduras) Said Martínez
- (Jamaica) Daneon Parchment
- (Mexico) Fernando Guerrero
- (Mexico) César Ramos
- (United States) Jair Marrufo

Assistants referees

- (Antigua and Barbuda) Iroots Appleton
- (Costa Rica) Juan Carlos Mora
- (El Salvador) David Morán
- (Guatemala) Gerson López
- (Guatemala) Humberto Panjoj
- (Honduras) Walter López
- (Jamaica) Nicholas Anderson
- (Jamaica) Ojay Duhaney
- (Mexico) Christian Kiabek Espinoza
- (Mexico) Alberto Morin
- (Nicaragua) Henri Pupiro
- (Panama) Ronald Bruna
- (United States) Frank Anderson

== Group stage ==
The top two teams from each group advanced to the semi-finals.

All times are local, CST (UTC−6).

=== Group A ===
Pos	Team	Pld	W	D	L	GF	GA	GD	Pts	Qualification
1	Mexico (H)	3	3	0	0	8	1	+7	9	Advance to knockout stage
2	United States	3	2	0	1	5	1	+4	6	Advance to knockout stage
3	Costa Rica	3	1	0	2	5	4	+1	3	
4	Dominican Republic	3	0	0	3	1	13	−12	0	

Source: CONCACAF
(H) Hosts
18 March 2021
15:30

United States	1–0	Costa Rica
Ferreira 35'	Report

Estadio Jalisco, Guadalajara
Referee: Said Martínez (Honduras)
18 March 2021
18:00

Mexico	4–1	Dominican Republic
Rodríguez 22'; Córdova 51', 69', 90+4'	Report	Azcona 73' (pen.)

Estadio Jalisco, Guadalajara
Referee: Reon Radix (Grenada)

21 March 2021
17:00

Dominican Republic	0–4	United States
	Report	Yueill 60'; Dotson 73', 78'; Mihailovic 90'

Estadio Akron, Zapopan
Referee: Daneon Parchment (Jamaica)
21 March 2021
19:30

Costa Rica	0–3	Mexico
	Report	Antuna 6'; Vega 52'; Córdova 69'

Estadio Akron, Zapopan
Referee: Iván Barton (El Salvador)

24 March 2021
17:00

Costa Rica	5–0	Dominican Republic
Ugalde 30'; Alfaro 43'; Leal 60', 70'; Salazar 72'	Report

Estadio Jalisco, Guadalajara
Referee: Fernando Guerrero (Mexico)
24 March 2021
19:30

Mexico	1–0	United States
Antuna 45'	Report

Estadio Jalisco, Guadalajara
Referee: Daneon Parchment (Jamaica)

=== Group B ===
Pos	Team	Pld	W	D	L	GF	GA	GD	Pts	Qualification
1	Honduras	3	1	2	0	5	2	+3	5	Advance to knockout stage
2	Canada	3	1	2	0	3	1	+2	5	Advance to knockout stage
3	El Salvador	3	1	1	1	3	4	−1	4	
4	Haiti	3	0	1	2	1	5	−4	1	

Source: CONCACAF
19 March 2021
13:30

Honduras	3–0	Haiti
Vuelto 14' (pen.), 38'; Rodríguez 18'	Report

Estadio Jalisco, Guadalajara
Referee: Jair Marrufo (United States)
19 March 2021
16:00

Canada	2–0	El Salvador
Buchanan 17', 21'	Report

Estadio Jalisco, Guadalajara
Referee: Fernando Guerrero (Mexico)

22 March 2021
16:00

Haiti	0–0	Canada
	Report

Estadio Akron, Zapopan
Referee: Juan Gabriel Calderón (Costa Rica)
22 March 2021
18:30

El Salvador	1–1	Honduras
Márquez 64'	Report	Martinez 46'

Estadio Akron, Zapopan
Referee: César Ramos (Mexico)

25 March 2021
17:30

El Salvador	2–1	Haiti
Pérez 19', 45+3'	Report	Louima 21'

Estadio Jalisco, Guadalajara
Referee: Jair Marrufo (United States)
25 March 2021
20:00

Honduras	1–1	Canada
Maldonado 30'	Report	Cornelius 28'

Estadio Jalisco, Guadalajara
Referee: César Ramos (Mexico)

== Knockout stage ==
In the knockout stage, if a match is level at the end of normal playing time, extra time is played (two periods of 15 minutes each) and followed, if necessary, by a penalty shoot-out to determine the winners.

=== Bracket ===
Semi-finals
28 March – Guadalajara
Honduras	2
United States	1
28 March – Guadalajara
Mexico	2
Canada	0

Final
30 April – Zapopan
Honduras	1 (4)
Mexico (p)	1 (5)

=== Semi-finals ===
The semi-final winners qualified for the 2020 Summer Olympics.

28 March 2021
16:00

Honduras	2–1	United States
Obregón 45+4'; Palma 47'	Report	Yueill 52'

Estadio Jalisco, Guadalajara
Referee: Iván Barton (El Salvador)

28 March 2021
19:00

Mexico	2–0	Canada
Antuna 58'; Vásquez 65'	Report

Estadio Jalisco, Guadalajara
Referee: Juan Gabriel Calderón (Costa Rica)

=== Final ===
30 March 2021
19:00

Honduras	1–1 (a.e.t.)	Mexico
Rodríguez 71'	Report	Macías 80' (pen.)
Penalties
Obregón (penalty missed); Rodríguez (penalty scored); Rivas (penalty scored); Meléndez (penalty scored); Reyes (penalty scored)	4–5	(penalty scored) Vásquez; (penalty scored) Mozo; (penalty scored) Antuna; (penalty scored) Angulo; (penalty scored) Vega

Estadio Akron, Zapopan
Referee: Daneon Parchment (Jamaica)

== Statistics ==
=== Goalscorers ===
There were 38 goals scored in 15 matches, for an average of 2.53 goals per match.

4 goals

- (Mexico) Sebastián Córdova

3 goals

- (Mexico) Uriel Antuna

2 goals

- (Costa Rica) Randall Leal
- (Canada) Tajon Buchanan
- (El Salvador) Joshua Pérez
- (Honduras) Edwin Rodríguez
- (Honduras) Darixon Vuelto
- (United States) Hassani Dotson
- (United States) Jackson Yueill

1 goal

- (Canada) Derek Cornelius
- (Costa Rica) Manfred Ugalde
- (Costa Rica) Bernald Alfaro
- (Costa Rica) Aarón Salazar
- (Dominican Republic) Edison Azcona
- (El Salvador) Marvin Márquez
- (Haiti) Roberto Louima
- (Honduras) Denil Maldonado
- (Honduras) Douglas Martínez
- (Honduras) Juan Carlos Obregón
- (Honduras) Luis Palma
- (Mexico) José Juan Macías
- (Mexico) Carlos Rodríguez
- (Mexico) Johan Vásquez
- (Mexico) Alexis Vega
- (United States) Jesús Ferreira
- (United States) Djordje Mihailovic

=== Awards ===
The following awards were given at the conclusion of the tournament.

Best Player	Best Goalkeeper	Top Goal Scorer
(Mexico) Alexis Vega	(Honduras) Alex Güity	(Mexico) Sebastián Córdova (4 goals, 2 assists)
Fair Play Award
Mexico

Best XI
Goalkeeper	Defenders	Midfielders	Forwards
(Honduras) Alex Güity	(Canada) Derek Cornelius (Mexico) Johan Vásquez (Honduras) Denil Maldonado (United States) Justen Glad	(Mexico) Sebastián Córdova (United States) Jackson Yueill (Honduras) Edwin Rodríguez	(Honduras) Luis Palma (Mexico) Alexis Vega (Mexico) Uriel Antuna

=== Final ranking ===
As per statistical convention in football, matches decided in extra time were counted as wins and losses, while matches decided by a penalty shoot-out were counted as draws.

Pos	Team	Pld	W	D	L	GF	GA	GD	Pts	Final result
1st place, gold medalist(s)	Mexico (H)	5	4	1	0	11	2	+9	13	Winners
2nd place, silver medalist(s)	Honduras	5	2	3	0	8	4	+4	9	Runner-ups
3	United States	4	2	0	2	6	3	+3	6	Eliminated in semi-finals
4	Canada	4	1	2	1	3	3	0	5	Eliminated in semi-finals
5	El Salvador	3	1	1	1	3	4	−1	4	Eliminated in group stage
6	Costa Rica	3	1	0	2	5	4	+1	3	Eliminated in group stage
7	Haiti	3	0	1	2	1	5	−4	1	Eliminated in group stage
8	Dominican Republic	3	0	0	3	1	13	−12	0	Eliminated in group stage

Source: CONCACAF
(H) Hosts

== Qualified teams for 2020 Summer Olympics ==
The following two teams from CONCACAF qualified for the 2020 Summer Olympic Men's football tournament.

Team	Qualified on	Previous appearances in Summer Olympics^{1}
Honduras	28 March 2021	4 (2000, 2008, 2012, 2016)
Mexico	28 March 2021	11 (1928, 1948, 1964, 1968, 1972, 1976, 1992, 1996, 2004, **2012**, 2016)

^{1} Bold indicates champions for that year. Italic indicates hosts for that year.

== Broadcasting ==
=== Television ===
Country	Broadcaster		Ref.
Country	Free	Pay	Ref.
Mexico **(Host)**	Canal 5 ∙ Las Estrellas	TUDN	
Canada		OneSoccer	
Costa Rica			
Dominican Republic			
El Salvador			
Haiti			
Honduras	Televicentro		
United States		FS1 ∙ FS2	
United States	UniMás	TUDN	

=== Radio ===
Country	Broadcaster	Ref.
United States	TUDN Radio	
