= Soccer at the 1999 Pan American Games – Men's tournament =

Football (Soccer) – Men's tournament at the 1999 Pan American Games
- Venue: Winnipeg Soccer Complex
- Dates: 23 July – 7 August

Medalists
Gold medal	Mexico
Silver medal	Honduras
Bronze medal	United States

The thirteenth edition of the Men's Football Tournament (soccer) at the Pan American Games was held in Winnipeg, Manitoba, Canada from July 23 to August 7, 1999. Since this edition, U-23 teams competed, with title defender Argentina missing. Mexico won their 3rd. gold medal after beating Honduras 3–1 in the final.

For the first time there was also a Women's Football Tournament included in the Pan Am Games.

== Group stage ==
=== Group A ===
Pos	Team	Pld	W	D	L	GF	GA	GD	Pts	Qualification
1	Mexico	4	2	2	0	7	4	+3	8	Semifinals
2	Canada	4	2	2	0	5	2	+3	8	Semifinals
3	Costa Rica	4	1	3	0	5	4	+1	6	
4	Guatemala	4	1	1	2	4	5	−1	4	
5	Trinidad and Tobago	4	0	0	4	2	8	−6	0	

- Mexico and Canada qualified to semifinals.
July 24, 1999

Canada	1–1	Costa Rica
De Rosario 34'		Bryce 75'

Winnipeg Soccer Complex, Winnipeg
Referee: Neftalí Recinos (SLV)

July 24, 1999

Mexico	2–1	Trinidad and Tobago
Ortiz 3'; Mendoza 21'		Pierre 11'

Winnipeg Soccer Complex, Winnipeg
Referee: Owen Powell (JAM)

July 26, 1999

Canada	2–0	Trinidad and Tobago
De Rosario 39', 71'

Winnipeg Soccer Complex, Winnipeg
Referee: Carlos Batres (GUA)

July 26, 1999

Guatemala	1–3	Mexico
Rivera 19'		Mendoza 22', 24', 38'

Winnipeg Soccer Complex, Winnipeg
Referee: Peter Prendergast (JAM)

July 28, 1999

Canada	2–1	Guatemala
Kindel 32'; Mathot 67' (pen.)		C. Ruiz 90'

Winnipeg Soccer Complex, Winnipeg
Referee: Richard Grady (USA)

July 28, 1999

Costa Rica	2–1	Trinidad and Tobago
Bryce 14'; Bolaños 32'		Peters 9'

Winnipeg Soccer Complex, Winnipeg
Referee: Neftalí Recinos (SLV)

July 30, 1999

Guatemala	2–0	Trinidad and Tobago
W. Alegria 58'; Rivera 78'

Winnipeg Soccer Complex, Winnipeg
Referee: Owen Powell (JAM)

July 30, 1999

Costa Rica	2–2	Mexico
Bolaños 15' (pen.); Bryce 84'		J. Rodríguez 27'; Mendoza 71'

Winnipeg Soccer Complex, Winnipeg
Referee: José Farías (CAN)

August 1, 1999

Costa Rica	0–0	Guatemala

Winnipeg Soccer Complex, Winnipeg
Referee: Carlos Batres (GUA)

August 1, 1999

Canada	0–0	Mexico

Winnipeg Soccer Complex, Winnipeg
Referee: Richard Gray (USA)

=== Group B ===
Pos	Team	Pld	W	D	L	GF	GA	GD	Pts	Qualification
1	Honduras	4	4	0	0	10	3	+7	12	Semifinals
2	United States	4	2	1	1	4	3	+1	7	Semifinals
3	Jamaica	4	2	0	2	6	4	+2	6	
4	Cuba	4	1	0	3	3	6	−3	3	
5	Uruguay	4	0	1	3	2	9	−7	1	

- Honduras and USA qualified to semifinals.
July 23, 1999

Cuba	0–1	United States
	Report	Vagenas 57'

Winnipeg Soccer Complex, Winnipeg
Referee: Olger Mejias (CRC)

July 23, 1999

Jamaica	2–0	Uruguay
Green 11' (pen.); Fuller 67'

Winnipeg Soccer Complex, Winnipeg
Referee: Alejandro Cruz (MEX)

July 25, 1999

Honduras	2–1	United States
J. Martínez 15'; Ramírez 78'	Report	Vagenas 56'

Winnipeg Soccer Complex, Winnipeg
Referee: Carlos Batres (GUA)

July 25, 1999

Cuba	3–1	Uruguay
A. Martínez 27', 74'; Lay 34'

Winnipeg Soccer Complex, Winnipeg
Referee: Peter Prendergast (JAM)

July 27, 1999

Honduras	4–1	Uruguay
J. Martínez 2' 69' de León 39' (pen.); Izaguirre 46'		G. Rodríguez 27'

Winnipeg Soccer Complex, Winnipeg
Referee: Olger Mejias (CRC)

July 27, 1999

Cuba	0–2	Jamaica
		L. Ruíz 24' (o.g.); Williams 88'

Winnipeg Soccer Complex, Winnipeg
Referee: Jose Farias (CAN)

July 29, 1999

Cuba	0–2	Honduras
		Pavón 6'; Pineda 79'

Winnipeg Soccer Complex, Winnipeg
Referee: Peter Prendergast (JAM)

July 29, 1999

Jamaica	1–2	United States
Fuller 57'	Report	Victorine 37'; Twellman 75'

Winnipeg Soccer Complex, Winnipeg
Referee: Carlos Batres (GUA)

July 31, 1999

United States	0–0	Uruguay
	Report

Winnipeg Soccer Complex, Winnipeg
Referee: Alejandro Cruz (MEX)

July 31, 1999

Honduras	2–1	Jamaica
Rosales 13'; Ramírez 56'		Griffiths 88'

Winnipeg Soccer Complex, Winnipeg
Referee: Olger Mejias (CRC)

== Knockout stage ==
Semi-finals
August 4 – Winnipeg
Mexico	4
United States	0
August 4 – Winnipeg
Honduras	2
Canada	0

Final
August 7 – Winnipeg
Mexico	3
Honduras	1
Third place
August 6 – Winnipeg
United States	2
Canada	1

=== Semi finals ===
August 3, 1999

Canada	0–2	Honduras
		Turcios 59'; Ramírez 89'

Winnipeg Soccer Complex, Winnipeg
Referee: Olger Mejia (CRC)

August 4, 1999

Mexico	4–0	United States
Ortiz 7', 19'; Mora 43'; Mendoza 84'	Report

Winnipeg Soccer Complex, Winnipeg
Attendance: 9,000
Referee: Carlos Batres (Guatemala)

=== Bronze medal match ===
August 6, 1999

Canada	1–2	United States
Pozniak 84'	Report	Bocanegra 6'; Donovan 59'

Winnipeg Soccer Complex, Winnipeg
Attendance: 10,000
Referee: Alejandro Cruz (MEX)

=== Gold Medal match ===
August 7, 1999

Mexico	3–1	Honduras
Altamirano 7'; Mora 55', 75'		Francisco Pavón 41'

Winnipeg Soccer Complex, Winnipeg
Attendance: 12,000
Referee: Peter Prendergast (Jamaica)

Team details

Mexico
Honduras

1999 Pan American Games winners

Mexico
Third title

== Medalists ==
Event	Gold	Silver	Bronze
Men's football	Mexico	Honduras	United States

== Goalscorers ==
There were 60 goals scored in 26 matches, for an average of 2.31 goals per match.

6 goals

- (Mexico) Jesús Mendoza

3 goals

- (Canada) Dwayne De Rosario
- (Costa Rica) Steven Bryce
- (Honduras) Jairo Martínez
- (Honduras) Luis Ramírez
- (Mexico) Emilio Mora
- (Mexico) Álvaro Ortiz

2 goals

- (Costa Rica) Jonathan Bolaños
- (Cuba) Ángel Martínez
- (Guatemala) Andrés Rivera
- (Honduras) Francisco Pavón
- (Jamaica) Ricardo Fuller
- (United States) Peter Vagenas

1 goal

- (Canada) Steve Kindel
- (Canada) Jason Mathot
- (Canada) Chris Pozniak
- (Cuba) Rudy Lay
- (Guatemala) Wálter Alegria
- (Guatemala) Carlos Ruiz
- (Honduras) Julio César de León
- (Honduras) Júnior Izaguirre
- (Honduras) Reynaldo Pineda
- (Honduras) Jaime Rosales
- (Honduras) Danilo Turcios
- (Jamaica) Steve Green
- (Jamaica) Winston Griffiths
- (Jamaica) Andy Williams
- (Mexico) Héctor Altamirano
- (Mexico) Juan Pablo Rodríguez
- (Trinidad and Tobago) Joseph Peters
- (Trinidad and Tobago) Nigel Pierre
- (United States) Carlos Bocanegra
- (United States) Landon Donovan
- (United States) Taylor Twellman
- (United States) Sasha Victorine
- (Uruguay) Gerardo Rodríguez

1 own goal

- (Cuba) Lázaro Ruíz (against Jamaica)
