= 2008 CONCACAF Men's Olympic Qualifying qualification =

Qualifying rounds for the 2008 CONCACAF Men's Pre-Olympic Tournament were held for the Central American and the Caribbean zones, narrowing the field from each zone to three nations and two nations, respectively.

In the following tables:

- P = total games played
- W = total games won
- D = total games drawn (tied)
- L = total games lost
- GF = total goals scored (goals for)
- GA = total goals conceded (goals against)
- Pts = total points accumulated

| Team qualified for the final round. |
| Team did not qualify for the final round |
| Team advances to playoff |

== North American zone ==
The 3 members of the North American zone automatically qualified to the final round:

Team
Canada
Mexico
United States

== Central American zone ==
Six teams were divided into two groups of three, or triangulars, and played a round of matches in round-robin format. The winner of each triangular advanced to the finals, and the runners-up played each other in a home-and-away playoff.

=== Triangular 1 ===
| Team | Pts | Pld | W | D | L | GF | GA | GD |
|---|---|---|---|---|---|---|---|---|
| Honduras | 4 | 2 | 1 | 1 | 0 | 4 | 1 | +3 |
| Panama | 4 | 2 | 1 | 1 | 0 | 3 | 2 | +1 |
| El Salvador | 0 | 2 | 0 | 0 | 2 | 1 | 5 | -4 |

November 7, 2007

| Panama | 2–1 | El Salvador |
|---|---|---|
| Torres 53'; Barahona 80' | (Report) | Flores 90' |

Estadio Nacional de Panamá, Panama City
Referee: Jimenez (Costa Rica)

November 9, 2007

| El Salvador | 0–3 | Honduras |
|---|---|---|
| | (Report) | Núñez 21'; Thomas 74'; Norales 90' |

Estadio Nacional de Panamá, Panama City
Attendance: 100
Referee: Guerrero (Nicaragua)

November 11, 2007

| Panama | 1–1 | Honduras |
|---|---|---|
| Aguilar 67' | (Report) | Bernárdez 28' |

Estadio Nacional de Panamá, Panama City
Attendance: 2,867
Referee: Walter López (Guatemala)

=== Triangular 2 ===
| Team | Pts | Pld | W | D | L | GF | GA | GD |
|---|---|---|---|---|---|---|---|---|
| Guatemala | 6 | 2 | 2 | 0 | 0 | 5 | 1 | +4 |
| Costa Rica | 3 | 2 | 1 | 0 | 1 | 10 | 3 | +7 |
| Nicaragua | 0 | 2 | 0 | 0 | 2 | 1 | 12 | -11 |

November 14, 2007

| Guatemala | 3–0 | Nicaragua |
|---|---|---|
| Noriega 39', 45'; Arreola 52' | (Report) |

Estadio Mateo Flores, Guatemala City
Attendance: 2,000
Referee: Zelaya (Honduras)

November 16, 2007

| Nicaragua | 1–9 | Costa Rica |
|---|---|---|
| Vanegas 44' | (Report) | Guerrero 8', 36', 40'; Ruiz 14', 16', 20'; Borges 25', 78'; Pérez 61' |

Estadio Mateo Flores, Guatemala City
Attendance: 100
Referee: Rodríguez (Panama)

November 18, 2007

| Costa Rica | 1–2 | Guatemala |
|---|---|---|
| Solorzano 14' | (Report) | Lalín 3'; Contreras 63' |

Estadio Mateo Flores, Guatemala City
Attendance: 8,000
Referee: Aguilar (El Salvador)

=== Play-off ===
The runners-up of each triangular met in a play-off to qualify for a spot in the final round.

November 30, 2007

| Panama | 0–1 | Costa Rica |
|---|---|---|
| | (Report) | Santana 56' |

Estadio Nacional de Panamá, Panama City
Attendance: 7,000
Referee: Wijngaarde (Suriname)

December 6, 2007

| Costa Rica | 0–1 (a.e.t.) | Panama |
|---|---|---|
| | (Report) | Quintero 63' |
Penalties
| Angulo (penalty scored); Santana (penalty scored); Sanchez (penalty scored); Chan (penalty missed); Borges (penalty missed) | 3 – 4 | (penalty scored) Torres; (penalty scored) Vazquez; (penalty scored) Quintero; (penalty missed) Bonilla; (penalty scored) Cooper |

Estadio Ricardo Saprissa, San José
Attendance: 5,800
Referee: Archundia (Mexico)

Panama 1–1 Costa Rica on aggregate. Panama won 4–3 on penalties.

== Caribbean zone ==
The Caribbean zone qualifiers were divided into two rounds. In the first round, 22 teams were divided into six groups, Groups A through F, and the six group winners advanced to the second round. The six second round teams were divided into two groups of three, Groups G and H, and the winners advanced to the finals.

=== First round ===
==== Group A - André Kamperveen Stadion, Paramaribo, Suriname ====
| Team | Pts | Pld | W | D | L | GF | GA | GD |
|---|---|---|---|---|---|---|---|---|
| Trinidad and Tobago | 7 | 3 | 2 | 1 | 0 | 7 | 0 | +7 |
| Suriname | 4 | 3 | 1 | 1 | 1 | 2 | 2 | 0 |
| Guyana | 4 | 3 | 1 | 1 | 1 | 4 | 7 | −3 |
| Netherlands Antilles | 1 | 3 | 0 | 1 | 2 | 2 | 6 | −4 |

August 31, 2007

| Trinidad and Tobago | 4–0 | Guyana |
| Suriname | 1–0 | Netherlands Antilles |

September 2, 2007

| Netherlands Antilles | 0–3 | Trinidad and Tobago |
| Suriname | 1–2 | Guyana |

September 4, 2007

| Guyana | 2–2 | Netherlands Antilles |
| Suriname | 0–0 | Trinidad and Tobago |

==== Group B - Guillermo Prospero Trinidad Stadium, Oranjestad, Aruba ====
| Team | Pts | Pld | W | D | L | GF | GA | GD |
|---|---|---|---|---|---|---|---|---|
| Jamaica | 9 | 3 | 3 | 0 | 0 | 12 | 1 | +11 |
| Antigua and Barbuda | 6 | 3 | 2 | 0 | 1 | 5 | 7 | −2 |
| Barbados | 3 | 3 | 1 | 0 | 2 | 3 | 3 | 0 |
| Aruba | 0 | 3 | 0 | 0 | 3 | 0 | 9 | −9 |

September 9, 2007

| Antigua and Barbuda | 1–6 | Jamaica |
| Aruba | 0–2 | Barbados |

September 11, 2007

| Jamaica | 1–0 | Barbados |
| Aruba | 0–2 | Antigua and Barbuda |

September 13, 2007

| Barbados | 1–2 | Antigua and Barbuda |
| Aruba | 0–5 | Jamaica |

==== Group C - Estadio Pedro Marrero, Havana, Cuba ====
| Team | Pts | Pld | W | D | L | GF | GA | GD |
|---|---|---|---|---|---|---|---|---|
| Cuba | 9 | 3 | 3 | 0 | 0 | 20 | 0 | +20 |
| Puerto Rico | 6 | 3 | 2 | 0 | 1 | 6 | 9 | −3 |
| Bermuda | 1 | 3 | 0 | 1 | 2 | 0 | 8 | −8 |
| Cayman Islands | 1 | 3 | 0 | 1 | 2 | 1 | 10 | −9 |

September 9, 2007

| Puerto Rico | 4–1 | Cayman Islands |
| Cuba | 6–0 | Bermuda |

September 11, 2007

| Cayman Islands | 0–0 | Bermuda |
| Cuba | 8–0 | Puerto Rico |

September 13, 2007

| Bermuda | 0–2 | Puerto Rico |
| Cuba | 6–0 | Cayman Islands |

==== Group D - Warner Park, Basseterre, St. Kitts and Nevis ====
| Team | Pts | Pld | W | D | L | GF | GA | GD |
|---|---|---|---|---|---|---|---|---|
| Haiti | 4 | 2 | 1 | 1 | 0 | 1 | 0 | +1 |
| Dominican Republic | 2 | 2 | 0 | 2 | 0 | 1 | 1 | 0 |
| Saint Kitts and Nevis | 1 | 2 | 0 | 1 | 1 | 1 | 2 | −1 |

September 9, 2007

| Saint Kitts and Nevis | 1–1 | Dominican Republic |

September 11, 2007

| Haiti | 0–0 | Dominican Republic |

September 13, 2007

| Saint Kitts and Nevis | 0–1 | Haiti |

==== Group E - Victoria Park, Kingstown, St. Vincent and the Grenadines ====
| Team | Pts | Pld | W | D | L | GF | GA | GD |
|---|---|---|---|---|---|---|---|---|
| Grenada | 5 | 3 | 1 | 2 | 0 | 9 | 6 | +3 |
| Saint Vincent and the Grenadines | 5 | 3 | 1 | 2 | 0 | 7 | 4 | +3 |
| Dominica | 3 | 3 | 1 | 0 | 2 | 3 | 8 | −5 |
| Saint Lucia | 2 | 3 | 0 | 2 | 1 | 4 | 5 | −1 |

September 9, 2007

| Saint Lucia | 3–3 | Grenada |
| Saint Vincent and the Grenadines | 4–1 | Dominica |

September 11, 2007

| Grenada | 3–0 | Dominica |
| Saint Vincent and the Grenadines | 0–0 | Saint Lucia |

September 13, 2007

| Dominica | 2–1 | Saint Lucia |
| Saint Vincent and the Grenadines | 3–3 | Grenada |

==== Group F - Thomas Robinson Stadium, Nassau, Bahamas ====
| Team | Pts | Pld | W | D | L | GF | GA | GD |
|---|---|---|---|---|---|---|---|---|
| Bahamas | 3 | 1 | 1 | 0 | 0 | 6 | 1 | +5 |
| U.S. Virgin Islands | 0 | 1 | 0 | 0 | 1 | 1 | 6 | −5 |
| British Virgin Islands | - | - | - | - | - | - | - | - |

September 2, 2007

| Bahamas | 6–1 | U.S. Virgin Islands |

- The British Virgin Islands withdrew at the last minute, leaving the Bahamas as the group champion.

=== Second round ===
==== Group G ====
| Team | Pts | Pld | W | D | L | GF | GA | GD |
|---|---|---|---|---|---|---|---|---|
| Cuba | 6 | 2 | 2 | 0 | 0 | 5 | 1 | +4 |
| Grenada | 3 | 2 | 1 | 0 | 1 | 4 | 4 | 0 |
| Trinidad and Tobago | 0 | 2 | 0 | 0 | 2 | 2 | 6 | -4 |

October 9, 2007

| Trinidad and Tobago | 0 – 3 | Cuba |
|---|---|---|
| | (Report) | 16' OG; 42' Duarte; 44' Yalmacida |

Marvin Lee Stadium, Macoya, Trinidad and Tobago
Attendance: 500
Referee: Rodríguez (MEX)
October 11, 2007

| Cuba | 2 – 1 | Grenada |
|---|---|---|
| Yalmacida 15' 67' | (Report) | 24' Antoine |

Marvin Lee Stadium, Macoya, Trinidad and Tobago
Attendance: 100
Referee: Garcia (MEX)
October 13, 2007

| Trinidad and Tobago | 2 – 3 | Grenada |
|---|---|---|
| Mitchell 77' 79' | report | 7' 34' Antoine; 46' pen Rennie |

Marvin Lee Stadium, Macoya, Trinidad and Tobago
Attendance: 200
Referee: Rodríguez (MEX)

==== Group H ====
| Team | Pts | Pld | W | D | L | GF | GA | GD |
|---|---|---|---|---|---|---|---|---|
| Haiti | 6 | 2 | 2 | 0 | 0 | 8 | 1 | +6 |
| Bahamas | 3 | 2 | 1 | 0 | 1 | 1 | 6 | -5 |
| Jamaica | 0 | 2 | 0 | 0 | 2 | 1 | 3 | -2 |

October 9, 2007

| Haiti | 6 – 0 | Bahamas |
|---|---|---|
| Vubert 34' 45'; Slcenat 44'; Saint Preux 53' 90+'; Norde 81' | (Report) |

Stade Sylvio Cator, Port-au-Prince, Haiti
Referee: Moreno (PAN)
October 11, 2007

| Bahamas | 1 – 0 | Jamaica |
|---|---|---|
| St. Fleur 84' | (Report) |

Stade Sylvio Cator, Port-au-Prince, Haiti
Referee: Quesada (CRC)
October 13, 2007

| Haiti | 2 – 1 | Jamaica |
|---|---|---|
| Azor 48'; Noel 76' | report | 20' Austin |

Stade Sylvio Cator, Port-au-Prince, Haiti
Attendance: 1,500
Referee: Moreno (PAN)
