= 2008 CONCACAF Men's Olympic Qualifying =

North American football tournament

CONCACAF MEN'S OLYMPIC QUALIFYING BEIJING 2008

Tournament details
- Host country: United States
- Dates: 11–23 March
- Teams: 8 (from 1 confederation)
- Venue: 3 (in 3 host cities)

Final positions
- Champions: Honduras (2nd title)
- Runners-up: United States
- Third place: Canada
- Fourth place: Guatemala

Tournament statistics
- Matches played: 16
- Goals scored: 36 (2.25 per match)
- Top scorer: (United States) Freddy Adu
- All statistics correct as of 27 April 2009.

The 2008 CONCACAF Men's Olympic Qualifying was the twelfth edition of the CONCACAF Men's Olympic Qualifying, the quadrennial, international, age-restricted football tournament organized by CONCACAF to determine which men's under-23 national teams from the North, Central America and Caribbean region qualify for the Olympic football tournament. It was held in the United States, from 11 and 23 March 2008.

Honduras won the title after with a 1–0 win over the United States in the final. As the top two teams, Honduras and the United States both qualified for the 2008 Summer Olympics in China as the CONCACAF representatives.

== Qualification ==
=== Qualified teams ===
The following teams qualified for the final tournament.

Zone	Country	Method of qualification	Appearance^{1}	Last appearance	Previous best performance	Previous Olympic appearances (last)
North America	Mexico (title holders)	Automatic	9th	2004	Winners (1964, 1972, 1976, 1996, 2004)	9 (2004)
North America	Canada	Automatic	6th	2004	Runners-up (1984, 1996)	3 (1984)
North America	United States (hosts)	Automatic	8th	2004	Winners (1988, 1992)	13 (2000)
Central America	Honduras	Triangular 1 winners	4th	2004	Winners (2000)	1 (2000)
Central America	Guatemala	Triangular 2 winners	6th	2000	Final round winner without outright champions (1968)	3 (1988)
Central America	Panama	Play-off winners	4th	2004	Fourth place (1964)	0
Caribbean	Cuba	Second round winners	3rd	1984	Third place (1976, 1984)	2 (1980)
Caribbean	Haiti	Second round winners	1st	0 (debut)	Debutant	0

^{1} Only final tournament.

== Venues ==
Three cities served as the venues for the tournament.

Tampa, Florida (Tampa Bay Area)	Carson, California (Los Angeles Area)	Nashville, Tennessee
Raymond James Stadium	The Home Depot Center	LP Field
Capacity: 65,856	Capacity: 27,000	Capacity: 69,143
Location of the host cities of the 2008 CONCACAF Men's Olympic Qualifying.

== Group stage ==
=== Group A ===
Pos	Team	Pld	W	D	L	GF	GA	GD	Pts	Qualification
1	United States (H)	3	2	1	0	3	1	+2	7	Advance to knockout stage
2	Honduras	3	2	0	1	3	1	+2	6	Advance to knockout stage
3	Panama	3	1	0	2	4	3	+1	3	
4	Cuba	3	0	1	2	2	7	−5	1	

Source: CONCACAF
(H) Hosts
11 March 2008
17:30

Panama	0–1	Honduras
	(Report)	Thomas 90'

Raymond James Stadium, Tampa, Florida
Attendance: 1,000
Referee: Enrico Wijngaarde (Suriname)
11 March 2008
20:00

United States	1–1	Cuba
Adu 13'	(Report)	Linares 42'

Raymond James Stadium, Tampa, Florida
Attendance: 4,359
Referee: Walter Adolfo López (Guatemala)

13 March 2008
17:30

Honduras	2–0	Cuba
Sánchez 68'; Thomas 76'	(Report)

Raymond James Stadium, Tampa, Florida
Attendance: 1,050
Referee: Roberto García Orozco (Mexico)
13 March 2008
20:00

United States	1–0	Panama
Adu 41' (pen.)	(Report)

Raymond James Stadium, Tampa, Florida
Attendance: 3,855
Referee: Dave Peterkin (Jamaica)

15 March 2008
16:30

Cuba	1–4	Panama
Duarte 64'	(Report)	Aguilar 18', 65'; Barahona 26'; Urgelles 31' (o.g.)

Raymond James Stadium, Tampa, Florida
Attendance: 10,974
Referee: Neal Brizan (Trinidad and Tobago)
15 March 2008
19:00

United States	1–0	Honduras
Gaven 90+5' (pen.)	(Report)

Raymond James Stadium, Tampa, Florida
Attendance: 10,974
Referee: Enrico Wijngaarde (Suriname)

=== Group B ===
Pos	Team	Pld	W	D	L	GF	GA	GD	Pts	Qualification
1	Guatemala	3	2	0	1	3	6	−3	6	Advance to knockout stage
2	Canada	3	1	1	1	7	3	+4	4	Advance to knockout stage
3	Mexico	3	1	1	1	7	4	+3	4	
4	Haiti	3	1	0	2	3	7	−4	3	

Source: CONCACAF
12 March 2008
17:30

Haiti	0–1	Guatemala
	(Report)	Ávila 27'

The Home Depot Center, Carson, California
Attendance: 9,949
Referee: Roberto Moreno (Panama)
12 March 2008
20:00

Canada	1–1	Mexico
Johnson 3'	(Report)	Landín 22' (pen.)

The Home Depot Center, Carson, California
Attendance: 9,949
Referee: Joel Aguilar (El Salvador)

14 March 2008
17:30

Canada	1–2	Haiti
Rosenlund 17'	(Report)	Gustave 72'; Saint-Preux 84'

The Home Depot Center, Carson, California
Attendance: 19,638
Referee: Jair Marrufo (United States)
14 March 2008
20:00

Mexico	1–2	Guatemala
Castillo 9'	(Report)	Villa 40'; López 67'

The Home Depot Center, Carson, California
Attendance: 19,638
Referee: Wálter Quesada (Costa Rica)

16 March 2008
16:30

Guatemala	0–5	Canada
	(Report)	Johnson 45', 46'; Ricketts 57', 80'; Hall 90+1'

The Home Depot Center, Carson, California
Attendance: 8,651
Referee: José Guerrero (Nicaragua)
16 March 2008
19:00

Mexico	5–1	Haiti
Villaluz 17'; Andrade 61'; Fernández 70'; Esqueda 83'; Landín 90'	(Report)	Saint-Preux 63'

The Home Depot Center, Carson, California
Attendance: 12,824
Referee: Joel Aguilar (El Salvador)

== Knockout stage ==
=== Bracket ===
Semi-finals
20 March – Nashville, TN
Guatemala	0 (5)
Honduras (p)	0 (6)
20 March – Nashville, TN
United States	3
Canada	0

Final
23 March – Nashville, TN
Honduras (a.e.t.)	1
United States	0
Third place play-off
23 March – Nashville, TN
Guatemala	0 (3)
Canada (p)	0 (5)

=== Semi-finals ===
The semi-final winners qualified for the 2008 Summer Olympics.

20 March 2008
17:00

Guatemala	0–0 (a.e.t.)	Honduras
	Report
Penalties
Contreras (penalty scored); Leon (penalty missed); Ávila (penalty scored); Brown (penalty scored); Marquez (penalty scored); Lalin (penalty scored); Morales (penalty missed)	5–6	(penalty scored) Morales; (penalty scored) Thomas; (penalty scored) Reyna; (penalty missed) Guity; (penalty scored) Sánchez; (penalty scored) Padilla; (penalty scored) Norales

LP Field, Nashville, Tennessee
Attendance: 13,201
Referee: Neal Brizan (Trinidad and Tobago)

20 March 2008
20:00

United States	3–0	Canada
Adu 27', 47'; Kljestan 78'	Report

LP Field, Nashville, Tennessee
Attendance: 13,201
Referee: Wálter Quesada (Costa Rica)

=== Third place play-off ===
23 March 2008
13:00

Guatemala	0–0 (a.e.t.)	Canada
	Report
Penalties
Contreras (penalty scored); Arreola (penalty missed); Ávila (penalty scored); Brown (penalty scored)	3–5	(penalty scored) Sánchez; (penalty scored) Ledgerwood; (penalty scored) Ayre; (penalty scored) Hemming; (penalty scored) Hall

LP Field, Nashville, Tennessee
Attendance: 12,663
Referee: Enrico Wijngaarde (Suriname)

=== Final ===
23 March 2008
16:00

Honduras	1–0 (a.e.t.)	United States
Welcome 102'	Report

LP Field, Nashville, Tennessee
Attendance: 12,663
Referee: Joel Aguilar (El Salvador)

== Statistics ==
=== Goalscorers ===
4 goals

- (United States) Freddy Adu

3 goals

- (Canada) Will Johnson

2 goals

- (Panama) Edwin Aguilar
- (Canada) Tosaint Ricketts
- (Haiti) Leonel Saint-Preux
- (Honduras) Hendry Thomas
- (Mexico) Luis Ángel Landín

=== Awards ===
The following awards were given at the conclusion of the tournament.

Best XI
Goalkeeper	Defenders	Midfielders	Forwards
(Honduras) Kevin Hernández	(Guatemala) Carlos Castrillo (Honduras) Oscar Morales (United States) Michael Orozco	(Panama) Nelson Barahona (Guatemala) José Manuel Contreras (United States) Maurice Edu (United States) Dax McCarty	(United States) Freddy Adu (Cuba) Leonel Duarte (Canada) Will Johnson

=== Final ranking ===
Pos	Team	Pld	W	D	L	GF	GA	GD	Pts	Final result
1st place, gold medalist(s)	Honduras	5	3	1	1	4	1	+3	10	Winners
2nd place, silver medalist(s)	United States (H)	5	3	1	1	6	2	+4	10	Runner-ups
3rd place, bronze medalist(s)	Canada	5	1	2	2	7	6	+1	5	Third place
4	Guatemala	5	2	2	1	3	6	−3	8	Fourth place
5	Mexico	3	1	1	1	7	4	+3	4	Eliminated in group stage
6	Panama	3	1	0	2	3	4	−1	3	Eliminated in group stage
7	Haiti	3	1	0	2	3	7	−4	3	Eliminated in group stage
8	Cuba	3	0	1	2	2	7	−5	1	Eliminated in group stage

(H) Hosts

== Qualified teams for 2008 Summer Olympics ==
The following two teams from CONCACAF qualified for the 2008 Summer Olympics Men's football tournament.

Team	Qualified on	Previous appearances in Summer Olympics^{1}
Honduras	20 March 2008	1 (2000)
United States	20 March 2008	13 (1904, 1924, 1928, 1936, 1948, 1952, 1956, 1972, 1984, 1988, 1992, 1996, 2000)

^{1} Bold indicates champions for that year. Italic indicates hosts for that year.

== Cuban defections ==
Following the Cuban draw against the United States, seven Cuban players defected, leaving the team with only 11 players which was reduced to 10 against Honduras. Cuba played its final game against Panama with no players available as substitutes because Roberto Linares was sent off from Cuba's match against the United States causing him to be automatically suspended for the team's next match.
