= Óscar Morales =

Oscar Morales may refer to:

- Óscar Javier Morales (born 1975), Uruguayan football defensive midfielder
- Oscar Morales (footballer, born 1986), Honduran football defender
