= Winston Griffiths =

Winston Griffiths may refer to:

- Win Griffiths (born 1943), British politician
- Winston Griffiths (footballer) (1978–2011), Jamaican soccer player
