= Alex Güity =

Honduran footballer (born 1997)

Personal information
- Full name: Alex Naid Güity Barrios
- Date of birth: 20 September 1997 (age 29)
- Place of birth: Tegucigalpa, Honduras
- Height: 1.85 m (6 ft 1 in)
- Position: Goalkeeper

Team information
- Current team: UPNFM (on loan from Olimpia)
- Number: 12

Senior career*
Years	Team	Apps	(Gls)
2018–	Olimpia	15	(0)
2021	→ Victoria (loan)	0	(0)
2024	→ UPNFM (loan)	15	(0)
2025–	→ UPNFM (loan)	2	(0)

International career^{‡}
2019–2021	Honduras U23	13	(0)
2021	Honduras	1	(0)
Medal record
Men's football
Representing Honduras
CONCACAF Nations League
Bronze medal – third place	2021
Pan American Games
Silver medal – second place	2019 Lima	Team
- * Club domestic league appearances and goals as of 03:25, 30 August 2025 (UTC) ‡ National team caps and goals as of 25 July 2021

Alex Naid Güity Barrios (Note: In this Spanish name, the first or paternal surname is Güity and the second or maternal family name is Barrios.) (born 20 September 1997) is a Honduran professional footballer who plays as a goalkeeper for Liga Nacional club Lobos UPNFM, on loan from Olimpia.

== Club career ==
Güity made his professional debut with Olimpia on 8 April 2019, starting in the 0–0 Liga Nacional draw with fierce rivals Motagua, filling in for the injured Donis Escober and absent Edrick Menjívar.

On 8 August 2021, Güity was presented as a new loan singing by Lobos UPNFM, however his parent club Olimpia disputed this and shortly after announced that Güity had in fact been loaned to Victoria, despite Güity already having signed a contract with UPNFM. The official loan move to Victoria was made official the following 10 August. Ultimately, Güity was recalled to Olimpia one month later, as Victoria could not register him.

On 28 December 2023, Lobos UPNFM was able to finalize a successful loan deal for Güity ahead of the 2024 Clausura season. He would make his debut for Lobos the following 28 January 2024, in the 3–0 home victory against Vida.

On 22 June 2025, Güity once again returned to Lobos on a season-long loan deal, after failing to register any minutes due to competition with first choice goalkeeper at Olimpia, Menjívar.

== International career ==
Güity made his debut for Honduras national football team on 12 June 2021 in a friendly against Mexico. Later he was selected for the Honduras Olympic team and appeared in all three games they played at the Olympics.

== Honours ==
Honduras U23

- Pan American Silver Medal: 2019

Honduras

- CONCACAF Nations League third place: 2021

Individual

- CONCACAF Men's Olympic Qualifying Tournament Golden Glove: 2020
- CONCACAF Men's Olympic Qualifying Tournament Best XI: 2020

== Personal life ==
Güity's half-brother, Ricardo Barrios, is also a professional footballer.
