= Oscar Morales (footballer, born 1986) =

Honduran footballer

Óscar Morales
Personal information
- Full name: Óscar Andrés Morales Guifarro
- Date of birth: 12 May 1986 (age 40)
- Place of birth: Guarizama, Honduras
- Height: 1.78 m (5 ft 10 in)
- Position: Defender

Team information
- Current team: Juticalpa

Senior career*
| Years | Team | Apps | (Gls) |
| 2006–2007 | Atlético Olanchano | | |
| 2007–2010 | Real España | | |
| 2011 | Platense | | |
| 2012 | Vida | | |
| 2013– | Juticalpa | | |

International career^{‡}
| 2007–2008 | Honduras U23 | 9 | (0) |
- * Club domestic league appearances and goals as of 2008 ‡ National team caps and goals as of 13 August 2008

Óscar Andrés Morales Guifarro (born 12 May 1986) is a Honduran footballer who plays for Juticalpa in the Honduran Second Division.

== Club career ==
Morales started his career at Atletico Olanchano and joined Real España in October 2007. He then signed for Platense at the end of 2010 but left them already after the 2011 Clausura season.

He joined Vida for the 2012 Clausura championship and moved to Juticalpa in January 2013.

== International career ==
Morales was also part of the U-23 Honduras national team that won the 2008 CONCACAF Men's Pre-Olympic Tournament and qualified to the 2008 Summer Olympics, where he played in two games.
