= Michael Perelló =

Honduran footballer (born 1998)

Personal information
- Date of birth: 11 July 1998 (age 28)
- Place of birth: Puerto Cortés, Honduras
- Height: 1.82 m (6 ft 0 in)
- Position: Goalkeeper

Team information
- Current team: Club Deportivo Victoria
- Number: 1

Youth career
- 2012–2016: Platense
- 2016–2018: Marathón

Senior career*
Years	Team	Apps	(Gls)
2018–	Real España	16	(0)

International career^{‡}
2013-2015	Honduras U17	10	(0)
2017	Honduras U20	2	(0)
2021–	Honduras U23	1	(0)
- * Club domestic league appearances and goals as of 25 July 2021 ‡ National team caps and goals as of 25 July 2021

Michael Alexandru Perelló López (born 11 July 1998) is a Honduran professional footballer who plays as a goalkeeper for Real España.
