= Christian Bolaños =

Costa Rican footballer (born 1984)

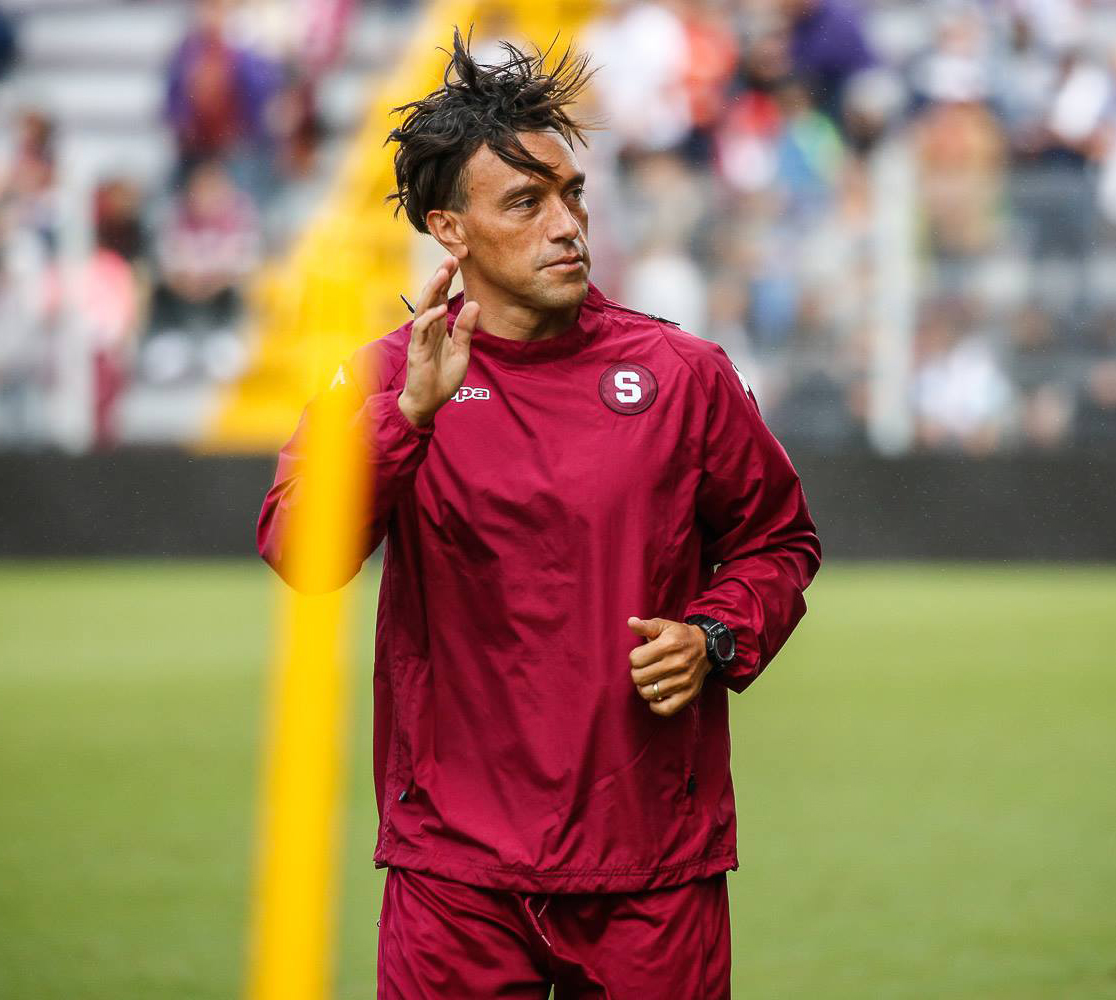
- Bolaños with Saprissa in 2018

Personal information
- Full name: Christian Bolaños Navarro
- Date of birth: 17 May 1984 (age 42)
- Place of birth: Hatillo de San José, Costa Rica
- Height: 1.78 m (5 ft 10 in)
- Position: Right winger

Youth career
- Saprissa

Senior career*
Years	Team	Apps	(Gls)
2001–2007	Saprissa	154	(12)
2007–2008	OB	24	(3)
2008–2010	Start	45	(13)
2010–2014	Copenhagen	101	(14)
2014	Cartaginés	12	(0)
2015	Al Gharafa	11	(4)
2015	Saprissa	13	(5)
2016–2017	Vancouver Whitecaps FC	48	(5)
2018–2020	Saprissa	98	(34)
2020–2021	Start	12	(2)
2021–2023	Saprissa	69	(15)
Total		587	(107)

International career
2001	Costa Rica U17	4	(0)
2005–2021	Costa Rica	87	(6)
- * Club domestic league appearances and goals

Christian Bolaños Navarro (born 17 May 1984) is a Costa Rican former professional footballer who played as a right winger. After his international debut with the Costa Rica national team in 2005, Bolaños earned over 80 international caps and played at three FIFA World Cups.

His brother Jonathan is also a footballer.

== Club career ==
=== Deportivo Saprissa ===
With Saprissa Bolaños won various national championships as well as a UNCAF Cup title and a CONCACAF Champions Cup title. Bolaños participated in the 2005 FIFA Club World Championship with his team, and was awarded by FIFA as the third best player of the tournament. Following this success he was invited to attend a ten-day trial with Liverpool, although he was not signed on a permanent basis.

On 9 August 2006, he signed a one-year loan deal with Premier League side Charlton Athletic. However, he failed to obtain a work permit having not played enough games for his country, and the deal fell through.

=== OB ===
On 2 June 2007, Bolaños signed a three-year contract with the Danish side OB in the top-flight Danish Superliga championship. Struggling to make an impact on the strong Danish midfield, Bolaños was a target for other clubs.

=== Start ===
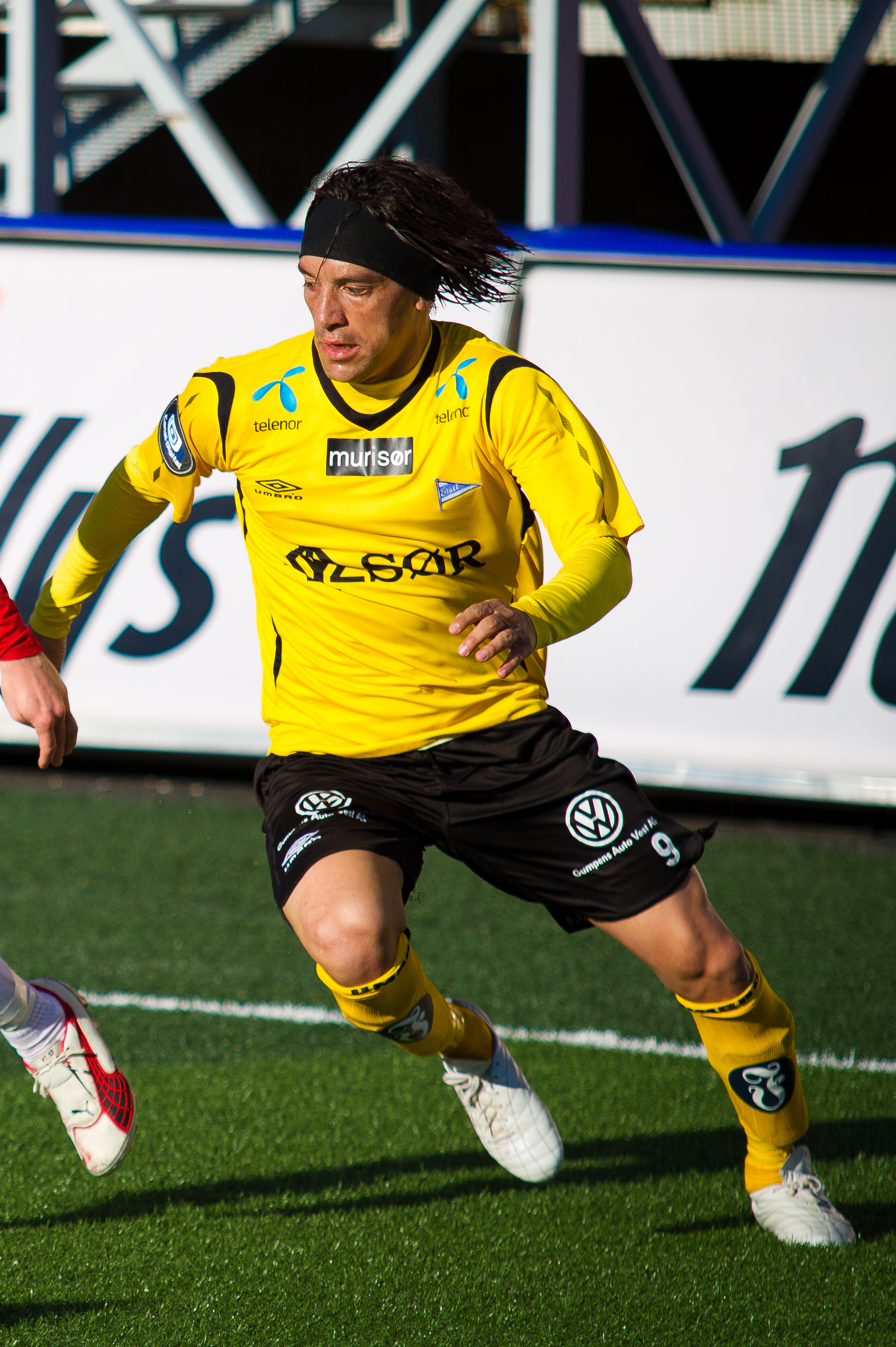
Bolaños playing for IK Start in 2010

On 6 November 2008, Bolaños signed a contract with newly promoted Norwegian side Start starting 1 January 2009.

In IK Start's first test against a Tippeligaen side, Bolaños received rave reviews from the media after outplaying Norwegian international Trond Erik Bertelsen of Viking, who a few days earlier had controlled Bastian Schweinsteiger during Norway's] win against Germany. Start coach Knut Tørum said after the game that he will be playing on the right wing during the 2009 season. In his first official match for Start, Bolaños scored two goals against Strømsgodset.

=== FC Copenhagen ===
On 30 August 2010, Bolaños signed a three-year contract with the defending champions of Denmark, FC Copenhagen at a cost of €1 million or 7.5 mio. DK kroner.

On 22 August 2012, Bolaños was linked with a £3 million move to English side Wolverhampton Wanderers, which could re-unite him with former Copenhagen manager Ståle Solbakken.

=== Cartaginés ===
On 8 September 2014, Bolaños signed with Cartaginés, only to leave them for Qatari side Al Gharafa after the winter championship.

=== Vancouver Whitecaps FC ===
On 20 January 2016, Bolaños signed a multi-year contract with Vancouver Whitecaps FC of Major League Soccer for an undisclosed amount.

=== Saprissa ===
Following two years with Vancouver, Bolaños returned to Saprissa again after his option was declined following the 2017 season.

== International career ==
Bolaños played in the 2001 FIFA U-17 World Championship held in Trinidad and Tobago.

He made his debut for the Costa Rica senior national team in a May 2005 friendly match against Norway and by November 2016 had collected a total of 71 caps, scoring 6 goals. He has represented his country in 25 FIFA World Cup qualification matches and played at both the 2006 FIFA World Cup and the 2014 FIFA World Cup as well as at the 2005, 2007 and 2011 CONCACAF Gold Cups.

In May 2018 he was named in Costa Rica's 23-man squad for the 2018 FIFA World Cup in Russia. By entering as a substitute in the first matchday defeat against Serbia, Bolaños became the only Costa Rican to play at three different FIFA World Cups, and overtook Michael Umaña as the Costa Rican with most matches played at the competition.

== Career statistics ==
=== Club ===
Appearances and goals by club, season and competition
Club	Season	League			National cup (Note: Includes Danish Cup, Norwegian Cup.)		Continental		Total	
Club	Season	Division	Apps	Goals	Apps	Goals	Apps	Goals	Apps	Goals
Saprissa	2001–02	Liga FPD	17	1	–		2	0	19	1
Saprissa	2002–03	Liga FPD	21	1	–		–		21	1
Saprissa	2003–04	Liga FPD	16	2	–		–		16	2
Saprissa	2004–05	Liga FPD	33	1	–		10	1	43	2
Saprissa	2005–06	Liga FPD	34	2	–		14	1	48	3
Saprissa	2006–07	Liga FPD	33	5	–		1	0	34	5
Saprissa	Total		154	12	0	0	27	2	181	14
OB	2007–08	Danish Superliga	22	3	1	0	4	0	27	3
OB	2008–09	Danish Superliga	2	0			3	0	5	0
OB	Total		24	3	1	0	7	0	32	3
Start	2009	Tippeligaen	25	7	2	1	–		27	8
Start	2010	Tippeligaen	20	6	5	0			25	6
Start	Total		45	13	7	1	0	0	52	14
Copenhagen	2010–11	Danish Superliga	24	6	3	0	8	0	35	6
Copenhagen	2011–12	Danish Superliga	32	3	4	0	10	2	46	5
Copenhagen	2012–13	Danish Superliga	23	2	1	1	8	1	32	4
Copenhagen	2013–14	Danish Superliga	22	3	3	0	6	0	31	3
Copenhagen	Total		101	14	11	1	32	3	144	18
Cartaginés	2014–15	Liga FPD	12	0	–		–		12	0
Al-Gharafa	2014–15	Qatar Stars League	11	4	–		–		11	4
Saprissa	2015–16	Liga FPD	13	5	–		1	0	14	5
Vancouver Whitecaps	2016	MLS	27	5	2	0	–		29	5
Vancouver Whitecaps	2017	MLS	24	0	–		2	0	26	0
Vancouver Whitecaps	Total		51	5	2	0	2	0	55	5
Saprissa	2017–18	Liga FPD	10	0	–		2	0	12	0
Saprissa	2018–19	Liga FPD	49	10	–		2	0	51	10
Saprissa	2019–20	Liga FPD	39	23	–		12	1	51	24
Saprissa	Total		98	33	0	0	16	1	114	34
Start	2020	Eliteserien	12	2	–		–		12	2
Saprissa	2020–21	Liga FPD	18	8	–		4	2	22	10
Saprissa	2021–22	Liga FPD	36	10	1	1	6	4	43	15
Saprissa	2022–23	Liga FPD	19	1	5	1	2	2	26	4
Career total			594	110	27	4	97	14	718	128

=== International ===
Appearances and goals by national team and year
National team	Year	Apps	Goals
Costa Rica	2005	12	1
Costa Rica	2006	6	0
Costa Rica	2007	4	0
Costa Rica	2008	1	0
Costa Rica	2009	8	0
Costa Rica	2010	2	0
Costa Rica	2011	8	0
Costa Rica	2012	4	1
Costa Rica	2013	8	0
Costa Rica	2014	7	0
Costa Rica	2015	2	0
Costa Rica	2016	10	4
Costa Rica	2017	8	0
Costa Rica	2018	4	0
Costa Rica	2019	2	0
Costa Rica	2021	1	0
Total		87	6

Scores and results list Costa Rica's goal tally first, score column indicates score after each Bolaños goal.

List of international goals scored by Christian Bolaños
No.	Date	Venue	Opponent	Score	Result	Competition
1	16 July 2005	Gillette Stadium, Foxborough, United States	Honduras	1–3	2–3	2005 CONCACAF Gold Cup
2	16 October 2012	Estadio Nacional, San José, Costa Rica	Guyana	5–0	7–0	2014 FIFA World Cup qualification
3	6 September 2016	Estadio Nacional, San José, Costa Rica	Panama	1–0	3–1	2018 FIFA World Cup qualification
4	6 September 2016	Estadio Nacional, San José, Costa Rica	Panama	2–0	3–1	2018 FIFA World Cup qualification
5	11 November 2016	Hasely Crawford Stadium, Port of Spain, Trinidad and Tobago	Trinidad and Tobago	1–0	2–0	2018 FIFA World Cup qualification
6	15 November 2016	Estadio Nacional, San José, Costa Rica	United States	2–0	4–0	2018 FIFA World Cup qualification

== Honours ==
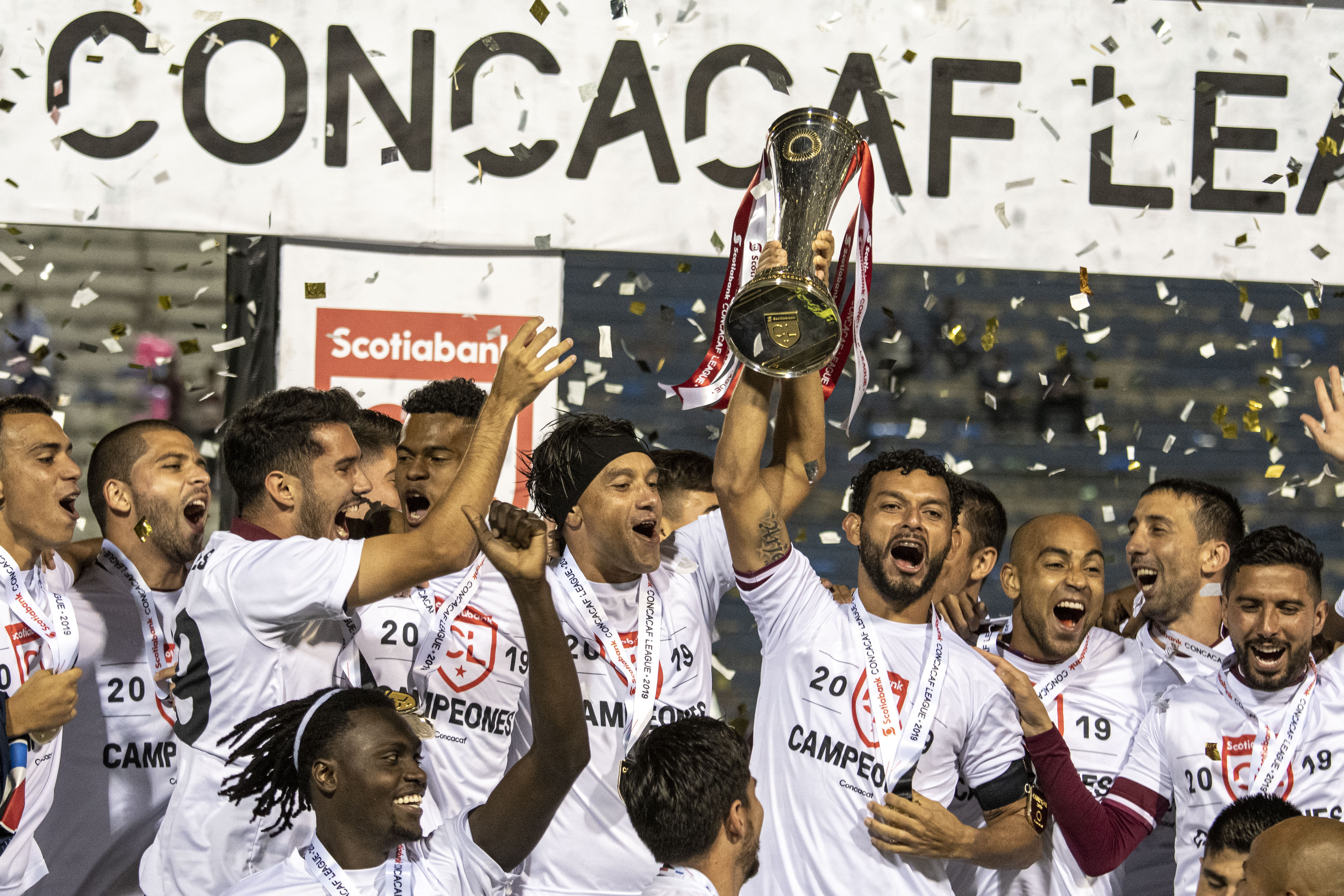
Bolaños holding the 2019 CONCACAF League trophy with Michael Barrantes

Saprissa

- Primera División: 2003–04, 2005–06, 2006–07
- Costa Rican short championship: 2003–04 Apertura, 2005–06 Apertura, 2005–06 Clausura, 2006–07 Apertura, 2006–07 Clausura, 2015–16 Apertura, 2017–18 Clausura, 2019–20 Clausura, 2020–21 Clausura
- FIFA Club World Cup third place: 2005
- CONCACAF Champions League: 2005; runner-up: 2004
- Copa Interclubes UNCAF: 2003; runner-up: 2007

Copenhagen

- Danish Superliga: 2010–11, 2012–13
- Danish Cup: 2011–12

Individual

- FIFA Club World Cup Bronze Ball: 2005
- CONCACAF Best XI: 2016

== See also ==
- List of Vancouver Whitecaps FC players
