= Ricardo Barrios =

Honduran footballer (born 1994)

Personal information
- Full name: Marvin Ricardo Barrios Alvarez
- Date of birth: 22 February 1994 (age 32)
- Place of birth: Corozal, Honduras
- Position: Midfielder

Team information
- Current team: Olimpia
- Number: 36

Senior career*
Years	Team	Apps	(Gls)
2012–2015	Motagua	63	(1)
2015–2017	Olimpia	3	(0)
2017–	Juticalpa	17	(1)

International career^{‡}
2012	Honduras U20	1	(0)
- * Club domestic league appearances and goals as of 23:02, 24 March 2021 (UTC) ‡ National team caps and goals as of 23:02, 24 March 2021 (UTC)

Marvin Ricardo Barrios Alvarez (born 22 February 1994) is a Honduran professional footballer who plays as a goalkeeper for Olimpia in the Honduran Liga Nacional.

== Career ==
Barrios made his professional debut with Motagua in a 2–0 Liga Nacional win over Platense F.C. on 5 August 2012.

== Personal life ==
Barrios' half-brother, Alex Güity, is also a professional footballer.
