= 1964 CONCACAF Pre-Olympic Tournament qualification =

1964 CONCACAF Pre-Olympic Tournament (Preliminary round)
Netherlands Antilles	Suriname
(Netherlands Antilles)	(Suriname (Kingdom of the Netherlands))
2	4

First leg
Netherlands Antilles	Suriname
2	1
- Date: 4 August 1963
- Venue: Rifstadion, Willemstad

Second leg
Suriname	Netherlands Antilles
3	0
- Date: 13 October 1963
- Venue: Suriname Stadion, Paramaribo

The preliminary round for the 1964 CONCACAF Pre-Olympic Tournament was a men's international football play-off between Suriname and Netherlands Antilles, with the winner qualifying for the final berth in the final tournament.

Suriname qualified for the final tournament with a 4–2 aggregate win over Netherlands Antilles, after a 1–2 loss in the first leg and a 3–0 win in the second leg.

== Matches ==
=== First leg ===
4 August 1963

Netherlands Antilles	2–1	Suriname
Albertsz 48'; Sillie 75' (pen.)	Report	Watson 56'

Rifstadion, Willemstad
Attendance: 3,000
Referee: José Isabel Morán (Panama)

=== Second leg ===
13 October 1963

Suriname	3–0	Netherlands Antilles
Reumel 29'; Haltman 44', 75'	Report

Suriname Stadion, Paramaribo
Attendance: 10,000
Referee: Benito Jackson (Venezuela)
