= Robert Arias =

Costa Rican footballer (born 1980)

Personal information
- Full name: Robert Alberto Arias Sancho
- Date of birth: 16 March 1980 (age 46)
- Place of birth: Heredia, Costa Rica
- Height: 1.78 m (5 ft 10 in)
- Position: Defender

Senior career*
Years	Team	Apps	(Gls)
1998-2011	Herediano	271	(18)
2011-2012	Municipal Pérez Zeledón	45	(6)
2012-2014	Heredia Jaguares	43	(2)
2014	Municipal Pérez Zeledón	5	(0)

International career
2001	Costa Rica	7	(0)
- * Club domestic league appearances and goals

Robert Alberto Arias Sancho (born 16 March 1980) is a Costa Rican retired footballer.

== Career ==
Arias started his career with Herediano, playing for them until 2011 despite offers from Alajuelense and Saprissa, the most successful team in Costa Rica.

While coaching Suchitepéquez in Guatemala, he claimed it was impossible to win in an away game against Sololá, due to death threats and the referee's bias.

== Personal life ==
Arias' nephew, Aarón Salazar, is also a professional footballer.
