= Carlos Villa (footballer) =

Guatemalan footballer (born 1986)

Personal information
- Full name: Carlos Andrés Villa Perdomo
- Date of birth: 18 July 1986 (age 40)
- Place of birth: Guatemala
- Height: 6 ft 1 in (1.85 m)
- Position: Forward

College career
| Years | Team | Apps | (Gls) |
| 2006–2007 | San Jacinto College | | |
| 2008–2009 | Hartford Hawks | | |

Senior career*
| Years | Team | Apps | (Gls) |
| 2012 | Xelajú | 13 | (0) |

International career
| 2011 | Guatemala | 1 | (0) |
- * Club domestic league appearances and goals

Carlos Andrés Villa Perdomo (born 18 July 1986) is a Guatemalan former professional footballer, who made one appearance for Guatemala in 2011.

Villa started his career at CSD Municipal, being the son of the club's former president, Ernesto Villa. In 2008 and 2009, he played at the University of Hartford in West Hartford, Connecticut. In September 2011 he was loaned from Municipal to Antigua GFC in Guatemala's Primera División de Ascenso. In February and March 2012, he was a part of a mid-season camp at Romanian Liga 1 club CS Concordia Chiajna.

In 2007 and 2008, he was a member of the Guatemala U-23 national team, playing at the 2008 Pre-Olympic tournament, where he scored one goal. His senior national team debut occurred on 11 November 2011 in a World Cup qualification match against Grenada.
