= Lyndon Antoine =

Grenadian football player

Personal information
- Date of birth: 18 March 1986 (age 40)
- Height: 1.78 m (5 ft 10 in)
- Position: Forward

Senior career*
Years	Team	Apps	(Gls)
2008–2009	Dulwich Hamlet		

International career
2006–2009	Grenada	5	(0)
Medal record
Second place	Caribbean Cup	2008
- * Club domestic league appearances and goals

Lyndon Antoine (born 18 March 1986) is a Grenadian footballer who served as midfielder for the Grenada national football team. His last international game was on 12 July 2009 where he played for Grenada under Thomas Taylor against Honduras.
