= Jonathan Bolaños =

Costa Rican footballer (born 1978)

Personal information
- Full name: Jonathan Bolaños Navarro
- Date of birth: April 22, 1978 (age 48)
- Place of birth: San José, Costa Rica
- Height: 1.78 m (5 ft 10 in)
- Positions: Midfielder; forward

Senior career*
Years	Team	Apps	(Gls)
1997–2000	Herediano		
2000–2001	La Piedad		
2001–2002	Saprissa	21	(2)
2002	Municipal Liberia		
2002–2003	Alajuelense	4	(0)
2003	Chicago Fire	2	(0)
2003–2004	Cartaginés		
2004	Seattle Sounders	14	(2)
2005–2006	Rochester Rhinos	20	(5)
2007–2008	Herediano	4	(0)

International career
2000	Costa Rica	3	(0)

Managerial career
- 2013–: Atlético Junior
- * Club domestic league appearances and goals

Jonathan Bolaños Navarro (born April 22, 1978) is a Costa Rican footballer who played as a striker.

Bolaños last played for Herediano in the Primera División de Costa Rica. His brother is Christian Bolaños, who currently plays as a midfielder for Vancouver Whitecaps FC of Major League Soccer and for the Costa Rica national football team. They were teammates in Saprissa.

== Club career ==
Bolaños began his career with Herediano, a team in the Primera División de Costa Rica, then he was sold to La Piedad (in Mexico), where he led the team to the 2002 Clausura Championship. Bolaños was transferred to the MLS, but he did not have a lot of opportunities so he moved back to Costa Rica and there he played for Saprissa and LD Alajuelense in 2002 and 2003, the two most important teams along the country in the Primera División de Costa Rica.

Bolaños made his Major League Soccer debut on October 4, 2003 with the Chicago Fire. In his first MLS start on October 26, Bolaños earned his first point on an assist just three minutes after getting into the match, but he did not get enough minutes and after a couple of years in Costa Rica, he returned to USA and played at the USL First Division first for Miami FC and then for Seattle Sounders and Rochester Raging Rhinos. He missed the entire 2006 season due to injury. He stayed there and played for a few seasons, but he recently received an offer from the team where he started up and debuted in the Primera División de Costa Rica, CS Herediano, so he moved back again to Costa Rica.

On June 8, 2009, Norwegian top-flight team Start, where Bolaños's brother, Christian, played at that time, took him on a two-week trial. He was not offered a contract with the club.

== International career ==
Bolaños played at the 1997 FIFA World Youth Championship in Malaysia and was a member of the 2000 Costa Rica Olympic team.

Bolaños made his debut for the senior national team in a June 2000 friendly match against Paraguay and collected a total of 3 caps, scoring no goals. He has represented his country in 1 FIFA World Cup qualification match, which proved to be his final international.

== Managerial career ==
Five years after retiring as a player, Bolaños took the reins of third division side Atlético Junior de Hatillo 8 in October 2013.
