= 1964 CONCACAF Pre-Olympic Tournament =

North American football tournament

Tournament details
- Host country: Mexico
- Dates: 16–20 March
- Teams: 4 (from 1 confederation)
- Venue: 1 (in 1 host city)

Final positions
- Champions: Mexico (1st title)
- Runners-up: Suriname

Tournament statistics
- Matches played: 6
- Goals scored: 29 (4.83 per match)
- Top scorer(s): (United States) Carl Gentile (Mexico) Aarón Padilla (3 goals each)

The 1964 CONCACAF Pre-Olympic Tournament was the first edition of the CONCACAF Pre-Olympic Tournament, the quadrennial, international football tournament organised by CONCACAF to determine which national teams from the North, Central America and Caribbean region qualify for the Olympic football tournament. It was held in Mexico, from 16 and 20 March 1964.

Host nation, Mexico, won the tournament and qualified for the 1964 Summer Olympics as the sole representative of CONCACAF.

== Qualification ==
=== Qualified teams ===
The following teams qualified for the final tournament.

Zone	Country	Method of qualification	Appearance^{1}	Last appearance	Previous best performance	Previous Olympic appearances (last)
North America	Mexico (hosts)	Automatic	1st	0 (debut)	Debutant	2 (1948)
North America	United States	Automatic	1st	0 (debut)	Debutant	7 (1956)
Central America	Panama	Automatic	1st	0 (debut)	Debutant	0
Caribbean	Suriname	Preliminary round winners	1st	0 (debut)	Debutant	0

^{1} Only final tournament.

== Venue ==
Mexico City hosted the tournament.

Mexico City	1964 CONCACAF Pre-Olympic Tournament is located in Mexico
Estadio Olímpico Universitario	1964 CONCACAF Pre-Olympic Tournament is located in Mexico
Capacity: 72,000	1964 CONCACAF Pre-Olympic Tournament is located in Mexico

== Final round ==
Pos	Team	Pld	W	D	L	GF	GA	GD	Pts	Qualification
1	Mexico (H, C)	3	3	0	0	13	2	+11	6	Qualification for 1964 Summer Olympics
2	Suriname	3	2	0	1	7	7	0	4	
3	United States	3	1	0	2	5	5	0	2	
4	Panama	3	0	0	3	4	15	−11	0	

Source: CONCACAF
(C) Champions; (H) Hosts
16 March 1964

Suriname	1–0	United States
Kluivert 17'	Report

Estadio Olímpico Universitario, Mexico City
Attendance: 10,000
Referee: Fernando Buergo (Mexico)
16 March 1964

Mexico	5–1	Panama
Ayala 9', 42'; Escalante 37', 51'; Padilla 57'	Report	Tapia 53'

Estadio Olímpico Universitario, Mexico City
Attendance: 10,000
Referee: Juan Soto Paris (Costa Rica)

18 March 1964

United States	4–2	Panama
Schweinert 48'; Wostl 59'; Gentile 67', 83'	Report	Díaz; Sanchez 58'

Estadio Olímpico Universitario, Mexico City
Attendance: 12,000
Referee: Zanger Goedheart (Suriname)
18 March 1964

Mexico	6–0	Suriname
Padilla 47', 50'; Vázquez 52'; Fragoso 66', 70'; González 76'	Report

Estadio Olímpico Universitario, Mexico City
Attendance: 12,000
Referee: Richard Gelner (United States)

20 March 1964

Panama	1–6	Suriname
De Garcia 35'	Report	Kluivert 16'; Waterval 20'; Reumel 38', 77'; Haltman 48', 82'

Estadio Olímpico Universitario, Mexico City
Attendance: 10,000
Referee: Jorge Méndez (Guatemala)
20 March 1964

Mexico	2–1	United States
Vázquez 3'; Padilla 62'	Report	Gentile 54'

Estadio Olímpico Universitario, Mexico City
Attendance: 10,000
Referee: Aristóteles Gómez (Honduras)

== Statistics ==
=== Goalscorers ===
There were 29 goals scored in 6 matches, for an average of 4.83 goals per match.

3 goals

- (United States) Carl Gentile
- (Mexico) Aarón Padilla

2 goals

- (Mexico) Mario Ayala
- (Mexico) Roberto Escalante
- (Mexico) Javier Fragoso
- (Mexico) Juan González
- (Suriname (Kingdom of the Netherlands)) Arnold Haltman
- (Suriname (Kingdom of the Netherlands)) Kenneth Kluivert
- (Suriname (Kingdom of the Netherlands)) Harold Reumel
- (Mexico) Guillermo Vázquez

1 goal

- (Panama) Juan De Gracia
- (Panama) Adolfo Díaz
- (Panama) Cirilo Sanchez
- (United States) Dick Schweinert
- (Panama) Luis Ernesto Tapia
- (Suriname (Kingdom of the Netherlands)) Edmund Waterval
- (United States) Wolfgang Wostl

== Qualified team for Summer Olympics ==
The following team from CONCACAF qualified for the 1964 Summer Olympics.

Team	Qualified on	Previous appearances in Summer Olympics^{2}
Mexico	20 March 1964	2 (1928, 1948)

^{2} Bold indicates champions for that year. Italic indicates hosts for that year.
