= Illinois Hispanic Chamber of Commerce =

U.S. state business organization

- Founded: 1990
- Type: Advocacy group
- Purpose: Business Advocacy
- Location: Chicago, IL
- Region served: Illinois
- Key people: Omar Duque President and CEO Roberto Escalante Chief Operating Officer
- Website: Illinois Hispanic Chamber of Commerce Official Website

The Illinois Hispanic Chamber of Commerce (IHCC) is the Illinois affiliate of the United States Hispanic Chamber of Commerce. Founded in 1990, the branch is the largest Hispanic business group in the state of Illinois.

== See also ==
- United States Hispanic Chamber of Commerce
- Greater Philadelphia Hispanic Chamber of Commerce
