= Steve Green (footballer) =

Jamaican footballer (born 1976)

Personal information
- Full name: Steve Green
- Date of birth: 2 July 1976 (age 50)
- Place of birth: Kingston, Jamaica
- Height: 1.80 m (5 ft 11 in)
- Position: Midfielder

Youth career
- 1988-1993: Tivoli Gardens High School

Senior career*
Years	Team	Apps	(Gls)
1992-2012	Tivoli Gardens	+300	(+100)
2012	Highgate United F.C.	10	(1)

International career
1998–2000	Jamaica	14	(0)
- * Club domestic league appearances and goals

Steve Green (born 2 July 1976) is a Jamaican former professional footballer Green spent the majority of his playing career as a central midfielder for Tivoli Gardens FC and also repented the Jamaica National team

== Early life ==
Steve Green was born on 2 July 1976 and grew up in the Western Kingston, Tivoli Gardens neighbourhood.

== Club career ==
Schoolboy Stardom: Green rose to national prominence during the 1990/1991 Manning Cup campaign, where he was a 14-year-old standout for Tivoli High School. and subsequently made his Seniors debut for Tivoli Gardens in following 1992/1993 season at the age of 15 year old while he was still attending high school. Green is frequently cited as a player who first represented the club as a schoolboy, bypassing a traditional youth team structure.

Senior Debut:

Green made his first-team debut for Tivoli in the 1992-93, In his first few seasons in the National Premier League the speedy Green was utilised strictly as a Forward. It was during this time period where Green eared the nickname “Askel45” which was due to his thunderous long range capabilities from either foot as well as his number 45 jersey he wore throughout his career. During his years in the national team set up was when National Technical Director René Simões noticed his high work rate. Simões eventually began experimenting with Green in deeper roles because his "energy and fight" were too valuable to keep solely at the top of the pitch. By the time Green won his first Premier League title in 1998-99, he had begun the transition from a pure striker to the utility midfielder/defender role he would occupy for the remainder of his 19-year career. Green became one of the longest serving Premier League players on the eve of the 2010/2011 season, his 19th season at the top level. He is the only player to have won four league titles with Tivoli.

Highgate United: Final season

Green's time at Highgate United was a brief but significant final chapter in his pricey career, occurring during the 2011-12 season. After a legendary 19-year tenure at Tivoli Gardens, he joined the newly promoted St. Mary-based club during the January transfer window to assist in their battle against relegation. While widely known as a "one-club man" for Tivoli Gardens, Green made a immediate impact upon joining Highgate in early 2012. On 8 February, Green made his debut for Highgate against Harbour View winning 3-0; He scored once, in the 12th minute. He officially hung up his boots following the end of this campaign, transitioning out of professional football as of July 1, 2012.

== International career ==
Nicknamed Askel 45, Green made his senior debut for Jamaica in a February 1998 friendly match against Nigeria, coming on as a substitute for Dean Sewell. He was included in the Jamaican squad in the build-up to the 1998 FIFA World Cup but did not make the final squad. He has not represented his country in any FIFA World Cup qualification match but did play at the 2000 CONCACAF Gold Cup. He also made the squad for the 1999 Copa Caribe and played at the 1999 Panamerican Games.

His final international game was a May 2000 friendly match against Colombia.

== Personal life ==
Green, as well as among others Tivoli Gardens teammate Owen Powell, was given a huge scare when detained by security forces during the Summer 2010 search for Christopher Coke in Tivoli Gardens community.

== Honours ==
- National Premier League: 4

1999, 2004, 2009, 2011
