= Carl Gentile =

American soccer player

Personal information
- Full name: Carl S. Gentile
- Date of birth: February 23, 1944 (age 82)
- Place of birth: St. Louis, Missouri, United States
- Position: Forward

Youth career
- 1963–1965: St. Louis Billikens

Senior career*
Years	Team	Apps	(Gls)
1967–1968	St. Louis Stars	40	(3)
1971	St. Louis Stars	3	(0)

International career
1968	United States	6	(0)
- * Club domestic league appearances and goals

Carl Gentile is a former U.S. soccer forward. He played one season in the National Professional Soccer League and two in the North American Soccer League, all three with the St. Louis Stars. He also earned six caps with the U.S. national team in 1968.

== Youth ==
Gentile grew up in St. Louis, Missouri where he graduated from Christian Brothers College High School in 1962. He is a member of the CBC Alumni Hall of Fame. Gentile went on to play for St. Louis University, gaining first team All-American recognition in 1965. That year St. Louis also won the NCAA championship. In 2009, Gentile was named to the St. Louis University Men's Soccer Half-Century Team.

== Professional ==
In 1967, Gentile signed with the St. Louis Stars of the National Professional Soccer League (NPSL). When the NPSL merged with the United Soccer Association in 1968 to form the North American Soccer League (NASL), the Stars moved to the NASL. Gentile played the 1968 NASL season, then left the team. He returned for the 1971 NASL season.

== Olympic and national teams ==
In 1964, Gentile joined the U.S. Olympic team as it attempted, but ultimately failed, to qualify for the 1964 Summer Olympics. The U.S. lost its first match of qualifying on March 16 when Surinam defeated the U.S. 1-0. Gentile scored three goals two days later in a 4–2 win over Panama. He scored again two days later in a 2–1 loss to Mexico which put the U.S. out of contention for the tournament.

Gentile earned his first cap with the U.S. national team on September 15, 1968. A month later he earned his second cap, this time as a defender in a 6–3 victory over Haiti. He then played three 1970 FIFA World Cup qualification matches, all three wins, the first over Canada and the next two over Bermuda.

== Other sports ==
Gentile played professional baseball in the New York Mets farm system and attempted to become a professional American football kicker, trying out for the Houston Oilers in 1970. He remained on the Oiler taxi squad for one season.

== Coaching ==
Gentile now coaches with the St. Louis Soccer Club, now known as Saint Louis Scott Gallagher.

He was inducted into the St. Louis Soccer Hall of Fame on October 20, 1995.
