= Aarón Salazar =

Costa Rican football player (born 1999)

Personal information
- Full name: Aarón Salazar Arias
- Date of birth: 15 May 1999 (age 27)
- Place of birth: Heredia, Costa Rica
- Height: 1.86 m (6 ft 1 in)
- Position: Defender

Team information
- Current team: Alajuelense
- Number: 24

Youth career
- 2006–2017: Herediano

Senior career*
Years	Team	Apps	(Gls)
2017–2024	Herediano	150	(12)
2018–2019	→ San Carlos (loan)	36	(1)
2024	→ San Carlos (loan)	18	(1)
2025–	Alajuelense	37	(0)

International career^{‡}
2021	Costa Rica U23	3	(1)
2021–	Costa Rica	6	(0)
- * Club domestic league appearances and goals as of 13 September 2026 ‡ National team caps and goals as of 10 June 2026

Aarón Salazar Arias (born 15 May 1999) is a Costa Rican footballer who plays as a defender for Alajuelense and the Costa Rica national team.

== Career ==
Salazar joined the youth academy of Herediano at the age of 7. He made his professional debut with Herediano in a 2–1 Liga FPD loss to Municipal Pérez Zeledón on 17 December 2017. He joined San Carlos on loan for 2 seasons, and after a successful stint was called back to the Herediano senior team.

== International career ==
Salazar debuted with the senior Costa Rica national team in a 4–0 friendly loss to the United States on 10 June 2021.

== Personal life ==
Salazar's uncle, Robert Arias, was also a professional footballer who represented the Costa Rica national team.

== Career statistics ==
=== International ===
As of match played 10 June 2026

Appearances and goals by national team and year
National team	Year	Apps	Goals
Costa Rica	2021	2	0
Costa Rica	2026	4	0
Total		6	0

== Honours ==
Herediano

- Costa Rican Primera División: 2017 Verano, 2019 Apertura
- Supercopa de Costa Rica: 2020

San Carlos

- Costa Rican Primera División: 2019 Clausura
