= Ariel Santana =

Costa Rican footballer (born 1988)

Personal information
- Full name: Ariel Santana Céspedes
- Date of birth: 21 January 1988 (age 38)
- Place of birth: San José, Costa Rica
- Height: 1.81 m (5 ft 11 1/2 in)
- Position: Striker

Youth career
- Saprissa

Senior career*
Years	Team	Apps	(Gls)
2008	UCR		
2008–2010	Saprissa	5	(1)
2009	→ Deportivo Pereira (loan)	6	(0)
2010	Ramonense		
2010–2011	Puntarenas	25	(5)
2011–	Belén	110	(25)

International career
2007	Costa Rica U-20		
- * Club domestic league appearances and goals as of 11 January 2013

Ariel Santana Céspedes (born 21 January 1988) is a Costa Rican professional footballer who plays as a striker for Belén.

== Club career ==
Santana started his career at Universidad, then played for Saprissa and had a loan spell at Colombian side Deportivo Pereira, before moving to Ramonense in January 2010 and then Puntarenas in summer 2010.

== Personal life ==
Ariel is a son of Carlos Santana, who played for Costa Rica during the 1984 Summer Olympics.
