= Andrei Sîntean =

Romanian footballer

Personal information
- Full name: Andrei Sîntean Mezin
- Date of birth: 16 June 1999 (age 27)
- Place of birth: Sânnicolau Mare, Romania
- Height: 1.76 m (5 ft 9 in)
- Position: Forward

Team information
- Current team: Pobeda Star Bîșnov

Youth career
- LPS Banatul Timișoara
- 2015–2017: ACS Poli Timișoara
- 2017–2018: Slavia Prague

Senior career*
Years	Team	Apps	(Gls)
2016–2017	Poli Timișoara	2	(0)
2017–2019	Slavia Prague	0	(0)
2018	→ Viktoria Žižkov (loan)	10	(1)
2019	→ Sepsi OSK (loan)	2	(0)
2019–2021	Hermannstadt	45	(4)
2022	Politehnica Timișoara	6	(0)
2022–2023	Avântul Periam	24	(10)
2023	Fužinar	5	(1)
2024	Gloria LT Cermei	13	(4)
2024–	Pobeda Star Bîșnov	10	(4)

International career^{‡}
2014	Romania U15	2	(0)
2014–2015	Romania U16	3	(2)
2015	Romania U17	3	(0)
2015	Romania U18	4	(0)
2017–2018	Romania U19	8	(1)
2017–2021	Romania U21	1	(0)
2021	Romania Olympic	5	(0)
- * Club domestic league appearances and goals as of 22:37, 6 January 2025 (UTC) ‡ National team caps and goals as of 12 August 2019

Andrei Sîntean (born 16 June 1999) is a Romanian professional footballer who plays as a forward for Pobeda Star Bîșnov.
