= Kang Yoon-sung (footballer) =

South Korean footballer (born 1997)

- Kang in 2026

Personal information
- Date of birth: 1 July 1997 (age 29)
- Place of birth: South Korea
- Height: 1.74 m (5 ft 8 1/2 in)
- Position: Midfielder

Team information
- Current team: Daejeon Hana Citizen
- Number: 6

Youth career
- 2013–2016: Daegu Technical High School

Senior career*
Years	Team	Apps	(Gls)
2016–2018	Daejeon Citizen	66	(3)
2019–2021	Jeju United	67	(3)
2022–2023	→ Gimcheon Sangmu (army)	37	(0)
2023–	Daejeon Citizen	73	(2)

International career^{‡}
2016–2017	South Korea U-20	1	(0)
2019–2021	South Korea U-23	17 (Note: Includes one appearance against another KFA team.)	(0)
Medal record
Men's football
Representing South Korea
AFC U-23 Championship
Gold medal – first place	2020 Thailand
- * Club domestic league appearances and goals as of 3 August 2026 ‡ National team caps and goals as of 31 July 2021

Kang Yoon-sung (Korean: 강윤성; born 1 July 1997) is a South Korean footballer who plays as midfielder for Daejeon Hana Citizen in K League 1.

== Career ==
Kang joined K League Challenge side Daejeon Citizen in January 2016.

== Honours ==
=== International ===
South Korea U23

- AFC U-23 Championship: 2020
