= Miguel Falero =

Uruguayan footballer (born 1957)

Miguel Falero Correa (born 17 May 1957) is a Uruguayan football manager and former footballer who manages Real España.

== Early life ==
Falero attended the Instituto Superior de Educación Física in Uruguay.

== Career ==
Falero played for Uruguayan side Peñarol, helping the club win the league.

== Style of play ==
Falero mainly operated as a midfielder and was known for his passing ability.

== Personal life ==
Falero has been married and has two children.
