= Douglas Martínez =

Honduran footballer (born 1997)

Personal information
- Full name: Douglas Francisco Martínez Juárez
- Date of birth: 5 June 1997 (age 29)
- Place of birth: Olanchito, Honduras
- Height: 1.83 m (6 ft 0 in)
- Positions: Forward; right-back

Team information
- Current team: Charleston Battery
- Number: 42

Youth career
- Vida

Senior career*
Years	Team	Apps	(Gls)
2013–2019	Vida	26	(3)
2017	→ New York Red Bulls II (loan)	15	(1)
2019–2021	Real Monarchs	32	(19)
2019–2021	Real Salt Lake	25	(2)
2021	→ San Diego Loyal (loan)	11	(2)
2022–2023	Sacramento Republic	28	(5)
2023–2024	Indy Eleven	59	(7)
2025–	Charleston Battery	53	(3)

International career^{‡}
2016–2017	Honduras U20	8	(1)
2018	Honduras U21	5	(3)
2019–2021	Honduras U23	12	(3)
2019–	Honduras	8	(1)
Medal record
Representing Honduras
Men's football
Pan American Games
Silver medal – second place	2019 Lima	Team competition
- * Club domestic league appearances and goals as of 4 November 2026 ‡ National team caps and goals as of 13 September 2025

Douglas Francisco Martínez Juárez (born 5 June 1997) is a Honduran professional footballer who plays as a forward for USL Championship club Charleston Battery and the Honduras national team. Although throughout his career he has operated as a forward, mainly a striker, he has also been deployed as a right-back.

== Club career ==
=== Early career ===
Born in Olanchito, Honduras, Martínez began his career in the youth ranks of Vida.

=== Vida (2013–2019) ===
On 7 September 2013, Martínez made his professional debut for Vida at the age of 16 in a Liga Nacional match against Real Sociedad. The match ended in a 2–2 draw. He scored his first professional goal on 31 July 2016, in a 1–1 draw with Real Sociedad at the Estadio Francisco Martínez Durón.

On 5 October 2016, it was confirmed that he would go on trial period for 10 days with United Soccer League side New York Red Bulls II. After his trial with the New York side, Martínez returned to Vida and featured 13 times during the 2016–17 season, starting in nine games and scoring one goal.

==== New York Red Bulls II (loan, 2017) ====
Having impressed the club during his trial in 2016, New York Red Bulls II announced the loan signing of Martínez on 26 April 2017. On 6 May 2017, Martínez made his debut, scoring his side's final goal in a 3–1 victory over Harrisburg City Islanders.

=== Real Monarchs (2019–2021) ===
On 23 January 2019, Martínez returned to the United States, permanently joining USL Championship side Real Monarchs. He made his debut in a 1–1 draw with Sacramento Republic. Martínez would go on to score 17 goals in 25 appearances for Real Monarchs, as his side won the USL Championship.

=== Real Salt Lake (2019–2021) ===
After impressing with Real Monarchs, Martínez moved to their MLS parent club Real Salt Lake in August 2019. He made his debut the following 11 September as a starter in a 1–0 home win over San Jose Earthquakes. He was replaced in the second-half by Jefferson Savarino. He scored his first goal on 27 July 2020 in the 5–2 round of 16 defeat to San Jose Earthquakes in the MLS is Back Tournament. He scored his first league goal in MLS on 14 October in the 2–1 home win against Portland Timbers. After having made only six appearances with no goals in the 2021 season, Martínez was demoted to the reserves once again. He made his second debut for Real Monarchs on 9 June 2021 in a 2–0 home win against Sacramento Republic FC. He scored the following 26 June in a 1–1 draw with San Antonio.

==== San Diego Loyal (loan, 2021) ====
On 23 August 2021, Martínez joined USL Championship side San Diego Loyal SC on loan until the end of the 2021 season. He made his debut in the 4–2 home win against LA Galaxy II. His first goal came on 9 October in a 2–1 home win against Sacramento Republic FC, after he came on as a substitute for Callum Montgomery.

Following the 2021 season, Martínez's contract option was declined by Real Salt Lake.

=== Sacramento Republic (2022–2023) ===
Martínez signed with USL Championship side Sacramento Republic on 27 January 2022 ahead of their 2022 season.

=== Indy Eleven (2023–2024) ===
USL Championship club Indy Eleven announced the signing of Martínez on 17 March 2023. Martínez played 31 matches in the 2023 USL Championship season and playoffs, scoring 4 goals and making 3 assists.

On 22 January 2024, Indy Eleven announced that Martínez's contract was extended through the 2024 USL Championship season.

Martínez scored his first goal in the 2024 USL Championship season on 16 March 2024, scoring the winning goal in a 2–1 away win against Memphis 901 FC. Martinez scored the only goal in a 1–0 victory over Chicago Fire FC II in the 4th minute on 17 April in the third round of the U.S. Open Cup. He additionally scored the winning goal for Indy Eleven in a 2–1 home victory over North Carolina FC on 27 April.

Martínez was released by Indy Eleven following the end of the 2024 season.

=== Charleston Battery (2024–present) ===
On 23 December 2024, USL Championship club Charleston Battery announced Martínez's signing to a multi-year deal.

== International career ==
Martínez featured regularly for his country's U-20 team, playing at 2017 CONCACAF U-20 Championship, starting five of the team's six matches notching one goal as Honduras qualified for the 2017 FIFA U-20 World Cup in South Korea with their second-place finish. He represented Honduras at the 2019 Pan American Games football tournament in Peru and scored twice in the competition winning silver with his country. Martínez was called up to the senior team for CONCACAF Nations League fixtures on 10 and 13 October 2019. He scored on his debut against Trinidad and Tobago in a 2–0 win away in Trinidad on 10 October 2019.

Martínez was called up for CONCACAF Nations League A fixtures on 6 and 10 September 2024 against Trinidad and Tobago and Jamaica.

== Career statistics ==
Scores and results list Honduras' goal tally first.

No.	Date	Venue	Opponent	Score	Result	Competition
1.	10 October 2019	Hasely Crawford Stadium, Port of Spain, Trinidad and Tobago	Trinidad and Tobago	2–0	2–0	2019–20 CONCACAF Nations League A

== Honours ==
Real Monarchs

- USL Cup: 2019

Honduras U23

- Pan American Silver Medal: 2019
