= Leonel Duarte =

Cuban footballer

Personal information
- Full name: Leonel Duarte Plat
- Date of birth: August 1, 1987 (age 39)
- Place of birth: Ciego de Ávila, Cuba
- Height: 1.80 m (5 ft 11 in)
- Position: Striker

Senior career*
Years	Team	Apps	(Gls)
2005–2015	Ciego de Ávila		
2012–2013	→ Einheit Worbis (loan)	18	(23)

International career
2005–2010	Cuba	40	(6)
- * Club domestic league appearances and goals

Leonel Duarte Plat (born 1 August 1987) is a Cuban retired footballer.

== Club career ==
Duarte played his entire career for his provincial side Ciego de Ávila, except for a season in Germany with amateur side SV Einheit 1875 Worbis.

== International career ==
He made his international debut for Cuba in a July 2005 CONCACAF Gold Cup match against the United States and has earned a total of 40 caps, scoring 6 goals. He represented his country in 7 FIFA World Cup qualification matches (1 goal) and played at 2 CONCACAF Gold Cup final tournaments.

His final international was a December 2010 Gold Cup qualification match against Grenada.

== Career statistics ==
=== International ===
Appearances and goals by national team and year
National team	Year	Apps	Goals
Cuba	2005	3	0
Cuba	2006	–	
Cuba	2007	11	2
Cuba	2008	18	4
Cuba	2009	–	
Cuba	2010	8	0
Total		40	6

Scores and results list Cuba's goal tally first, score column indicates score after each Duarte goal.

List of international goals scored by Leonel Duarte
No.	Date	Venue	Opponent	Score	Result	Competition
1	16 January 2007	Manny Ramjohn Stadium, Marabella, Trinidad and Tobago	Saint Vincent and the Grenadines	3–0	3–0	2007 Caribbean Cup
2	20 January 2007	Hasely Crawford Stadium, Port of Spain, Trinidad and Tobago	Trinidad and Tobago	1–3	1–3	2007 Caribbean Cup
3	17 June 2008	Sir Vivian Richards Stadium, North Sound, Antigua and Barbuda	Antigua and Barbuda	4–3	4–3	2010 FIFA World Cup qualification
4	23 October 2008	Estadio Pedro Marrero, Havana, Cuba	Netherlands Antilles	1–0	7–1	2008 Caribbean Cup qualification
5	23 October 2008	Estadio Pedro Marrero, Havana, Cuba	Netherlands Antilles	4–0	7–1	2008 Caribbean Cup qualification
6	27 October 2008	Estadio Pedro Marrero, Havana, Cuba	Suriname	5–0	6–0	2008 Caribbean Cup qualification
