= Honduras national under-23 football team =

Honduras Olympic
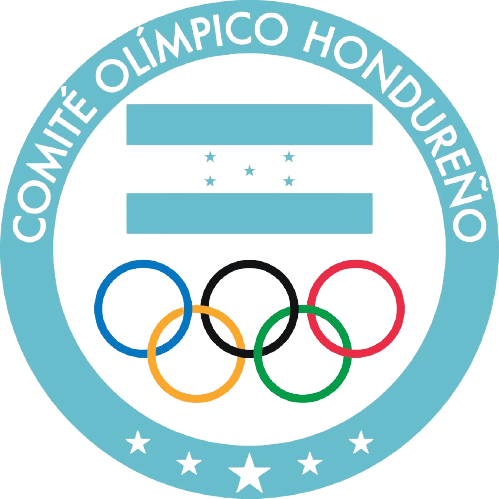
- Nickname(s): La Bicolor Olimpica (The Olympic Bicolor); Sub-23; La H U23
- Association: FFH
- Confederation: CONCACAF (North America)
- Sub-confederation: UNCAF (Central America)
- Head coach: Vacant
- FIFA code: HON
First colours	Second colours

First international
- Guatemala 2–2 Honduras (Guatemala; 16 March 1991)

Biggest win
- Honduras 5–0 Nicaragua (San Pedro Sula, Honduras; 25 September 2011)

Biggest defeat
- Brazil 6–0 Honduras (Rio de Janeiro, Brazil; 17 August 2016); South Korea 6–0 Honduras (Yokohama, Japan; 28 July 2021)

Olympic Games
- Appearances: 5 (first in 2000)
- Best result: Fourth place (2016)

Pan American Games
- Appearances: 5 (first in 1991)
- Best result: Silver medalist (1999, 2019)

The Honduras national under-23 football team represents Honduras in international football competitions (finals stage and qualifiers) in the Olympic Games and the Pan American Games. The selection is limited to players under the age of 23, except for three over-age players. The team is controlled by the Football Federation of Honduras (FFH).

Honduras have qualified for five Men's Olympic Football Tournaments, in Sydney 2000, Beijing 2008, London 2012, Rio de Janeiro 2016 and Tokyo 2020.

== Competitive record ==
=== Olympic Games ===
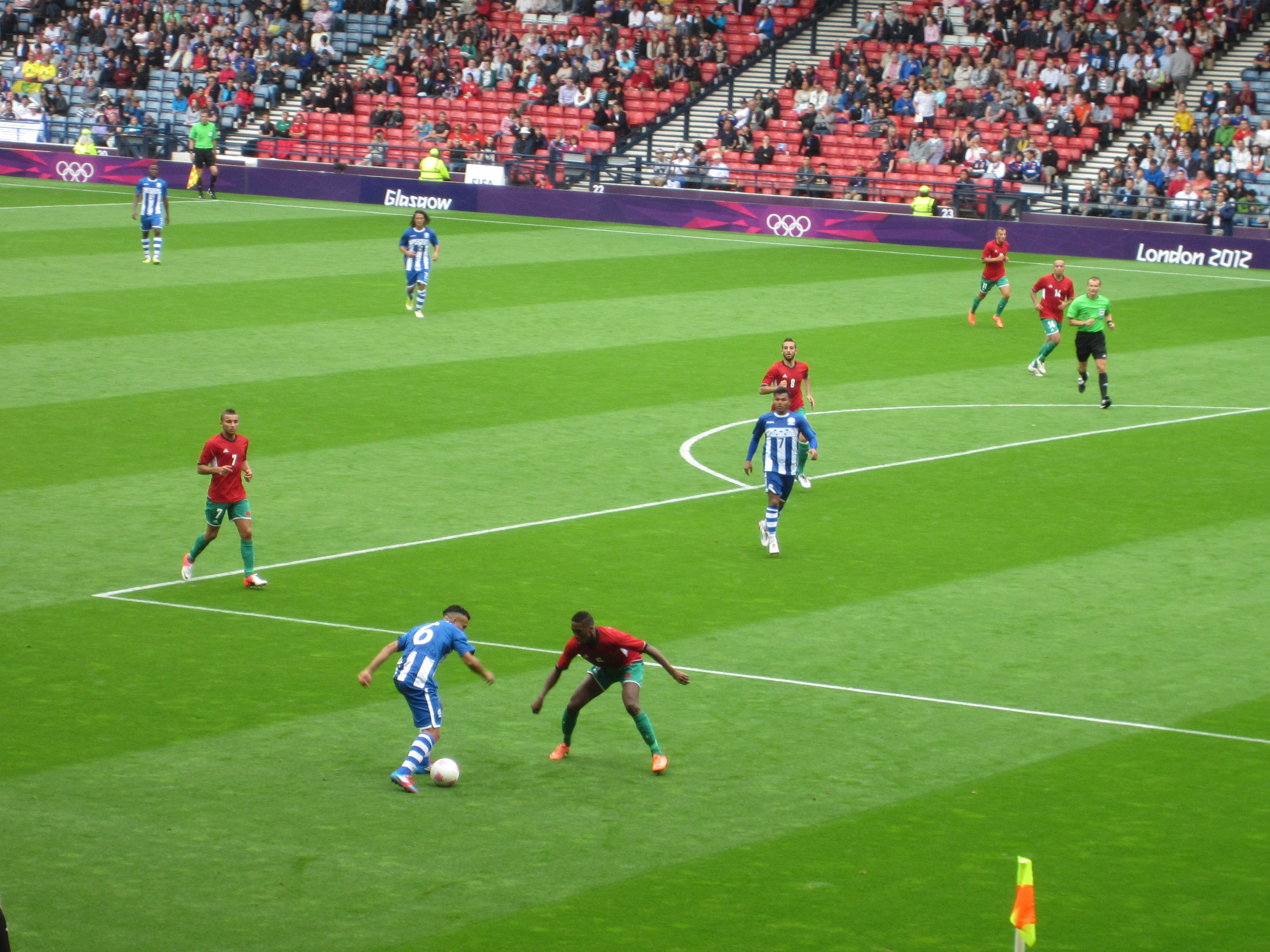
Honduras playing against Morocco at the 2012 Summer Olympics

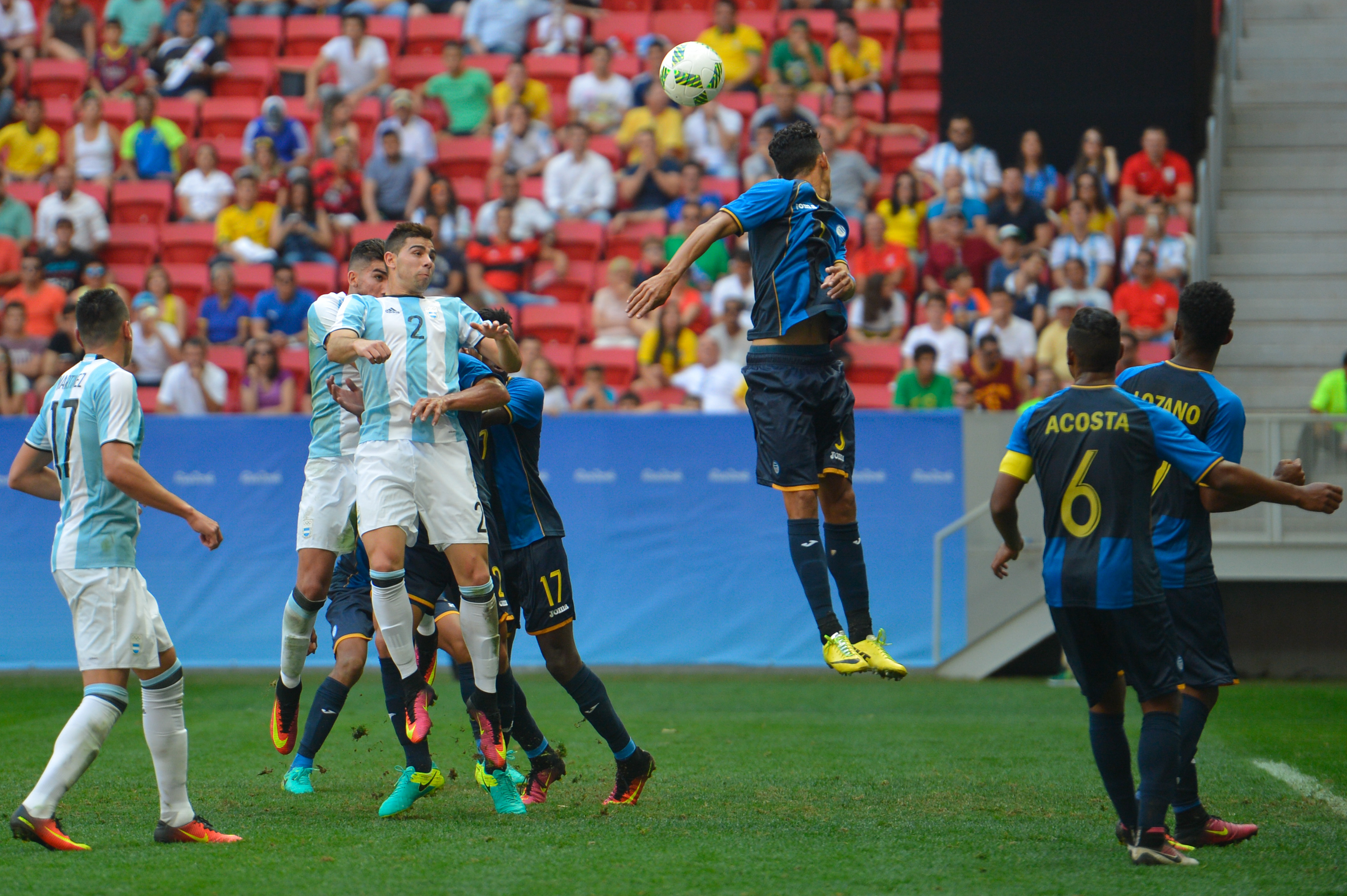
Honduras playing against Argentina at 2016 Summer Olympics

Olympic Games record
Year	Round	Position	Pld	W	D	L	GF	GA	Squad
(Spain) 1992	Did not qualify								
(United States) 1996	Did not enter								
(Australia) 2000	Group stage	10th	3	1	1	1	6	7	Squad
(Greece) 2004	Did not qualify								
(China) 2008	Group stage	16th	3	0	0	3	0	5	Squad
(United Kingdom) 2012	Quarter-finals	7th	4	1	2	1	5	5	Squad
(Brazil) 2016	Fourth place	4th	6	2	1	3	8	14	Squad
(Japan) 2020	Group stage	14th	3	1	0	2	3	9	Squad
(France) 2024	Did not qualify								
Total	Fourth place	5/9	19	5	4	10	22	40	—

=== CONCACAF Men's Olympic qualifying tournament ===
CONCACAF Men's Olympic Qualifying Tournament record
Year	Round	Pld	W	D	L	GF	GA
(Peru) 1960	Did not enter						
(Mexico) 1964	Did not enter						
1968	Withdrew						
1972	Did not enter						
1976	First round	2	0	1	1	0	2
1980	Did not enter						
1984	First round	2	0	0	2	2	4
1988	First round	2	0	1	1	3	4
1992	Fourth place	12	5	3	4	21	21
(Canada) 1996	Did not enter						
(United States) 2000	First place	9	5	3	1	19	9
(Mexico) 2004	Third place	7	3	2	2	11	10
(United States) 2008	First place	7	4	2	1	8	2
(United States) 2012	Second place	7	4	1	2	16	10
(United States) 2015	Second place	7	5	0	2	13	5
(Mexico) 2020	Second place	5	2	3	0	8	4
Total		60	28	16	16	101	71

=== Pan American Games ===
Pan American Games record
Year	Round	Position	Pld	W	D	L	GF	GA	Squad
Until 1995	See Honduras national football team								
(Canada) 1999	Silver medal	2nd	6	5	0	1	13	6	Squad
(Dominican Republic) 2003	Did not qualify								
(Brazil) 2007	Group stage	7th	3	1	0	2	4	7	Squad
(Mexico) 2011	Did not qualify								
(Canada) 2015	Did not qualify								
(Peru) 2019	Silver medal	2nd	5	1	2	2	7	11	Squad
(Chile) 2023	Seventh place	7th	4	1	0	3	4	8	Squad
Total	2 Silver medals	6/19	18	8	2	8	28	32	—

== Results and fixtures ==
Win Draw Loss Voided or Postponed Fixture

== Coaching staff ==
=== Current coaching staff ===
As of 16 June 2026

Name	Role
	Manager

=== Manager history ===
List of managers since 1975 to present:

- 1975: (Germany) Peter Lange
- 1983: (Honduras) Roberto González
- 1986–1987: (Honduras) Ángel Rodríguez
- 1991: (Spain) Luis López
- 1991–1992: (Brazil) Flavio Ortega
- 1999–2000: (Honduras) Ramón Maradiaga
- 2003–2004: (Honduras) Edwin Pavón
- 2007–2008: (Colombia) Alexis Mendoza
- 2008: (Honduras) Gilberto Yearwood
- 2011: (Uruguay) Miguel Falero
- 2012–2014: (Colombia) Luis Suárez
- 2015–2017: (Colombia) Jorge Pinto
- 2019: (Uruguay) Fabián Coito
- 2021: (Uruguay) Miguel Falero
- 2023: (Honduras) Luis Alvarado
- 2023: (Colombia) Bernardo Redin

== Players ==
=== Current squad ===
The following 18 players were called up for the 2023 Pan American Games.

No.	Pos.	Player	Date of birth (age)	Club
1	GK	Juergen García	28 January 2005 (aged 18)	(National Autonomous Federation of Football of Honduras) Lone FC
18	GK	Enrique Facussé^{*}	30 December 1998 (aged 24)	(National Autonomous Federation of Football of Honduras) Motagua
3	DF	Julián Martínez	1 December 2003 (aged 19)	(National Autonomous Federation of Football of Honduras) Olimpia
4	DF	André Orellana	11 March 2002 (aged 21)	(National Autonomous Federation of Football of Honduras) Marathón
5	DF	Luis Vega	28 February 2002 (aged 21)	(National Autonomous Federation of Football of Honduras) Motagua
6	DF	Javier Arriaga	1 August 2004 (aged 19)	(National Autonomous Federation of Football of Honduras) Marathón
15	DF	Afronit Tatum	2 June 2005 (aged 18)	(National Autonomous Federation of Football of Honduras) Real España
16	DF	Edson Palacios	11 June 2001 (aged 22)	(National Autonomous Federation of Football of Honduras) Vida
17	DF	Axel Maldonado	24 July 2001 (aged 22)	(National Autonomous Federation of Football of Honduras) Olimpia
2	MF	Deyron Martínez	20 December 1999 (aged 23)	(National Autonomous Federation of Football of Honduras) Real Sociedad
8	MF	Gerson Chávez	31 January 2000 (aged 23)	(National Autonomous Federation of Football of Honduras) Vida
10	MF	Antony García	29 October 2004 (aged 18)	(National Autonomous Federation of Football of Honduras) Motagua
11	MF	Jefryn Macías	2 January 2004 (aged 19)	(National Autonomous Federation of Football of Honduras) Lobos UPNFM
14	MF	David Ruiz	8 February 2004 (aged 19)	(United States Soccer Federation) Inter Miami
9	FW	Daniel Carter	12 September 2003 (aged 20)	(National Autonomous Federation of Football of Honduras) Real España
12	FW	Samuel Elvir	25 April 2001 (aged 22)	(National Autonomous Federation of Football of Honduras) Marathón
13	FW	Marco Aceituno	28 December 2003 (aged 19)	(National Autonomous Federation of Football of Honduras) Real España
^{*} Overage player.

=== Overage players in Olympic Games ===
Tournament	Player 1	Player 2	Player 3
2000	Did not select		
2008	Samuel Caballero (DF)	Emil Martínez (MF)	Carlos Pavón (FW)
2012	Maynor Figueroa (DF)	Roger Espinoza (MF)	Jerry Bengtson (FW)
2016	Johnny Palacios (DF)	Romell Quioto (FW)	Did not select
2020	Brayan Moya (MF)	Jorge Benguché (FW)	Did not select

== Records ==
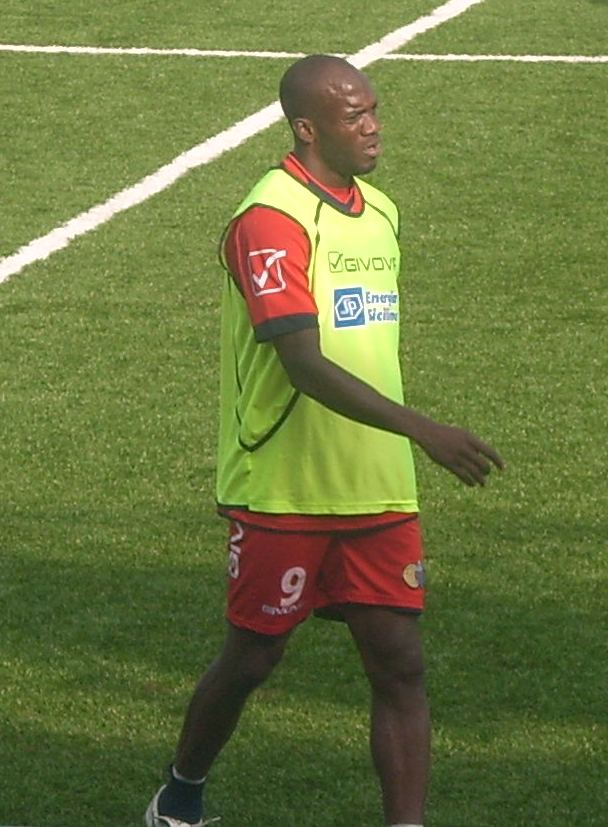
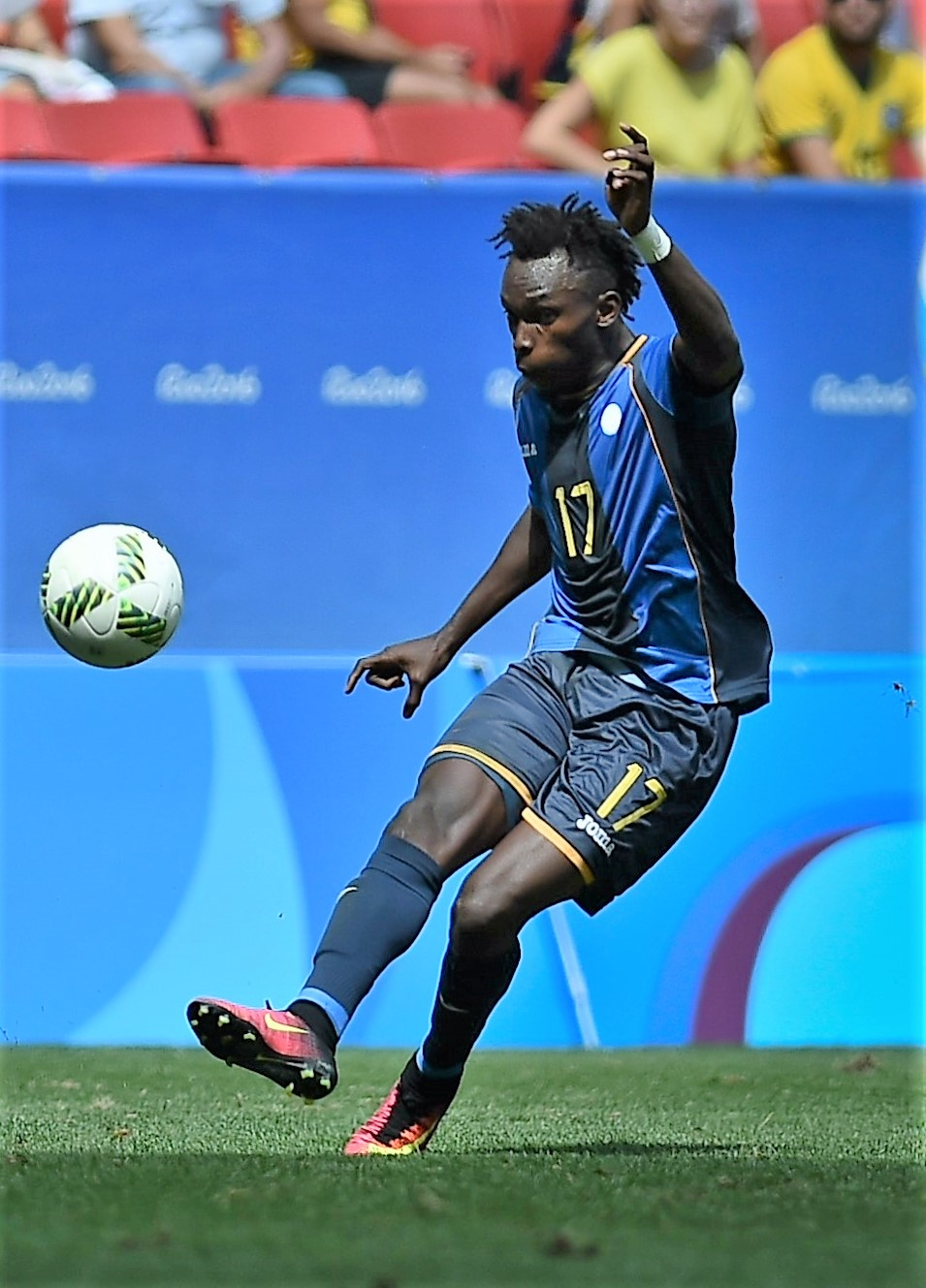
David Suazo (left) and Alberth Elis (right) are joint all-time top goalscorers of the Honduras U-23 national team with 6 goals each

=== Top goalscorers ===
Rank	Player	Year(s)	U-23 Goals
1	David Suazo	2000	6
2	Alberth Elis	2015–2016	6
3	Anthony Lozano	2012–2016	4
4	Eddie Hernández	2011–2012	3
5	Jerry Bengtson	2012	3
5	Roger Rojas	2012	3
5	Douglas Martínez	2019–2021	3

== Head-to-head record ==
The following table shows Honduras national under-23 football team's head-to-head record in the Football at the Summer Olympics.

Football at the Summer Olympics matches (by team)
Opponent	Pld	W	D	L	GF	GA	GD	Confederation
Algeria	1	1	0	0	3	2	+1	CAF
Argentina	1	0	1	0	1	1	0	CONMEBOL
Australia	1	1	0	0	2	1	+1	OFC*
Brazil	2	0	0	2	2	9	−7	CONMEBOL
Cameroon	1	0	0	1	0	1	−1	CAF
Italy	2	0	0	2	1	6	−5	UEFA
Japan	1	0	1	0	0	0	0	AFC
Morocco	1	0	1	0	2	2	0	CAF
New Zealand	1	1	0	0	3	2	+1	OFC
Nigeria	2	0	1	1	5	6	−1	CAF
Portugal	1	0	0	1	1	2	−1	UEFA
Romania	1	0	0	1	0	1	−1	UEFA
South Korea	3	1	0	2	1	7	−6	AFC
Spain	1	1	0	0	1	0	+1	UEFA
Total	19	5	4	10	22	40	−18	

*Australia was part of the Oceania Football Confederation until 2006.

== Honours ==
Major competitions

- Pan American Games
  - Silver medalists (2): 1999, 2019
- CONCACAF Olympic Qualifying Tournament
  - Winners (2): 2000, 2008
  - Runners-up (3): 2012, 2015, 2020
  - Third place (1): 2004

== See also ==
- Sport in Honduras
- Football in Honduras
- Honduras national football team
