= 2020 CONCACAF Men's Olympic Qualifying Championship squads =

International football tournament

The 2020 CONCACAF Men's Olympic Qualifying Championship was an international football tournament that was held in Mexico from 18 to 30 March 2021. The eight national teams involved in the tournament were required to register a squad of twenty players, three of whom had to be goalkeepers.

Each national team had to submit a provisional list with up to fifty players to FIFA and CONCACAF at least thirty days before their first match in the tournament. The final list of twenty players per national team had to be submitted to FIFA and CONCACAF up to ten days before the start of the tournament. Once the final lists had been submitted, teams were only permitted to make replacements in cases of force majeure or serious injuries up to 24 hours before their first match, where the replacement players needed to be in the preliminary squad.

The provisional lists were published by CONCACAF on 23 February 2021. The final lists were published by CONCACAF on 11 March 2021.

All registered players had to have been born on or after 1 January 1997 (Regulations Article 13). The age listed for each player is on 18 March 2021, the first day of the tournament. A flag is included for coaches who are of a different nationality than their own national team. Players marked in bold have been capped at full international level.

== Group A ==
=== Mexico ===
Head coach: Jaime Lozano

The 50-man provisional squad was announced on 23 February 2021. The 20-man final squad was announced on 11 March 2021.

No.	Pos.	Player	Date of birth (age)	Club
1	GK	Luis Malagón	2 March 1997 (aged 24)	(Mexican Football Federation) Necaxa
12	GK	Sebastián Jurado	28 September 1997 (aged 23)	(Mexican Football Federation) Cruz Azul
20	GK	Carlos Moreno	29 January 1998 (aged 23)	(Mexican Football Federation) Pachuca
2	DF	Vladimir Loroña	16 November 1998 (aged 22)	(Mexican Football Federation) Tijuana
3	DF	Alejandro Mayorga	29 May 1997 (aged 23)	(Mexican Football Federation) Guadalajara
4	DF	**Gilberto Sepúlveda**	4 February 1999 (aged 22)	(Mexican Football Federation) Guadalajara
5	DF	**Johan Vásquez**	22 October 1998 (aged 21)	(Mexican Football Federation) UNAM
13	DF	**Alan Mozo**	5 April 1997 (aged 23)	(Mexican Football Federation) UNAM
18	DF	**Alberto Angulo**	30 January 1998 (aged 23)	(Mexican Football Federation) Atlas
6	MF	**Alan Cervantes**	17 January 1998 (aged 23)	(Mexican Football Federation) Santos Laguna
8	MF	**Carlos Rodríguez**	3 January 1997 (aged 23)	(Mexican Football Federation) Monterrey
11	MF	**Roberto Alvarado**	7 September 1998 (aged 22)	(Mexican Football Federation) Cruz Azul
14	MF	**Érick Aguirre**	23 February 1997 (aged 24)	(Mexican Football Federation) Pachuca
15	MF	**Uriel Antuna**	21 August 1997 (aged 23)	(Mexican Football Federation) Guadalajara
16	MF	**José Joaquín Esquivel**	7 January 1998 (aged 23)	(Mexican Football Federation) Juárez
17	MF	**Sebastián Córdova**	12 June 1997 (aged 23)	(Mexican Football Federation) América
19	MF	**Ricardo Angulo**	20 February 1997 (aged 24)	(Mexican Football Federation) Guadalajara
7	FW	Santiago Muñoz	14 August 2002 (aged 18)	(Mexican Football Federation) Santos Laguna
9	FW	**José Juan Macías**	22 September 1999 (aged 21)	(Mexican Football Federation) Guadalajara
10	FW	**Alexis Vega**	25 November 1997 (aged 23)	(Mexican Football Federation) Guadalajara

=== United States ===
Head coach: Jason Kreis

The 48-man provisional squad was announced by CONCACAF on 23 February 2021, and was reduced to 31 players on 1 March 2021. The 20-man final squad was announced on 11 March 2021. On 18 March 2021, midfielder Ulysses Llanez was ruled out due to an ankle injury and was replaced by Tanner Tessmann.

No.	Pos.	Player	Date of birth (age)	Club
1	GK	JT Marcinkowski	9 May 1997 (aged 23)	(United States Soccer Federation) San Jose Earthquakes
12	GK	**Matt Freese**	2 September 1998 (aged 22)	(United States Soccer Federation) Philadelphia Union
20	GK	David Ochoa	16 January 2001 (aged 20)	(United States Soccer Federation) Real Salt Lake
2	DF	**Julián Araujo**	13 August 2001 (aged 19)	(United States Soccer Federation) LA Galaxy
3	DF	**Henry Kessler**	25 June 1998 (aged 22)	(United States Soccer Federation) New England Revolution
4	DF	Justen Glad	28 February 1997 (aged 24)	(United States Soccer Federation) Real Salt Lake
5	DF	Mauricio Pineda	17 October 1997 (aged 23)	(United States Soccer Federation) Chicago Fire FC
13	DF	**Sam Vines**	31 May 1999 (aged 21)	(United States Soccer Federation) Colorado Rapids
17	DF	**Aaron Herrera**	6 July 1997 (aged 23)	(United States Soccer Federation) Real Salt Lake
6	MF	**Jackson Yueill** (captain)	19 March 1997 (aged 23)	(United States Soccer Federation) San Jose Earthquakes
8	MF	**Djordje Mihailovic**	10 November 1998 (aged 22)	(Canadian Soccer Association) CF Montréal
10	MF	Sebastian Saucedo	22 January 1997 (aged 24)	(Mexican Football Federation) UNAM
11	MF	**Tanner Tessmann**	4 September 2001 (aged 19)	(United States Soccer Federation) FC Dallas
15	MF	**Andrés Perea**	14 November 2000 (aged 20)	(United States Soccer Federation) Orlando City SC
16	MF	**Johnny Cardoso**	20 September 2001 (aged 19)	(Brazilian Football Confederation) Internacional
18	MF	Hassani Dotson	6 August 1997 (aged 23)	(United States Soccer Federation) Minnesota United
7	FW	**Jonathan Lewis**	4 June 1997 (aged 23)	(United States Soccer Federation) Colorado Rapids
9	FW	**Jesús Ferreira**	24 December 2000 (aged 20)	(United States Soccer Federation) FC Dallas
14	FW	Benji Michel	23 October 1997 (aged 23)	(United States Soccer Federation) Orlando City SC
19	FW	**Sebastian Soto**	28 July 2000 (aged 20)	(The Football Association) Norwich City

=== Costa Rica ===
Head coach: Douglas Sequeira

The 50-man provisional squad was announced by CONCACAF on 23 February 2021, The 20-man final squad was announced on 10 March 2021.

No.	Pos.	Player	Date of birth (age)	Club
1	GK	Adonis Pineda	2 April 1997 (aged 23)	(Costa Rican Football Federation) Sporting FC
13	GK	Kevin Chamorro	8 April 2000 (aged 20)	(Costa Rican Football Federation) San Carlos
18	GK	Patrick Sequeira	1 March 1999 (aged 22)	(Royal Spanish Football Federation) Celta de Vigo
2	DF	**Aarón Salazar**	15 May 1999 (aged 21)	(Costa Rican Football Federation) Herediano
3	DF	Yurguin Román	19 January 1997 (aged 24)	(Costa Rican Football Federation) Alajuelense
4	DF	**Ian Smith**	6 March 1998 (aged 23)	(Costa Rican Football Federation) Alajuelense
6	DF	**Luis José Hernández**	7 February 1998 (aged 23)	(Costa Rican Football Federation) Saprissa
12	DF	Kevin Espinoza	11 February 1997 (aged 24)	(Costa Rican Football Federation) Guadalupe
15	DF	Alexis Gamboa	20 March 1999 (aged 21)	(Costa Rican Football Federation) Alajuelense
19	DF	Fernán Faerrón	22 August 2000 (aged 20)	(Costa Rican Football Federation) Alajuelense
5	MF	**Jefferson Brenes**	13 April 1997 (aged 23)	(Costa Rican Football Federation) Herediano
7	MF	**Marvin Loría**	24 April 1997 (aged 23)	(United States Soccer Federation) Portland Timbers
8	MF	**Bernald Alfaro**	26 January 1997 (aged 24)	(Costa Rican Football Federation) Alajuelense
10	MF	**Randall Leal**	14 January 1997 (aged 24)	(United States Soccer Federation) Nashville SC
11	MF	**Luis Díaz**	6 December 1998 (aged 22)	(United States Soccer Federation) Columbus Crew SC
16	MF	**Alonso Martínez**	15 October 1998 (aged 22)	(Costa Rican Football Federation) Alajuelense
17	MF	**Gerson Torres**	28 August 1997 (aged 23)	(Costa Rican Football Federation) Herediano
20	MF	**Jimmy Marín**	8 October 1997 (aged 23)	(Costa Rican Football Federation) Saprissa
9	FW	**Jurguens Montenegro**	13 December 2000 (aged 20)	(Costa Rican Football Federation) Alajuelense
14	FW	**Manfred Ugalde**	25 May 2002 (aged 18)	(Royal Belgian Football Association) Lommel

=== Dominican Republic ===
Coach: (Mexico) Jacques Passy

The 50-man provisional squad was announced by CONCACAF on 23 February 2020. The 20-man final squad was announced on 8 March 2021. Defender Lean Torres withdrew injured and was replaced by Josué Báez on 18 March 2021.

No.	Pos.	Player	Date of birth (age)	Club
1	GK	**Johan Guzmán** (captain)	3 July 1997 (aged 23)	(Royal Spanish Football Federation) Real Ávila
12	GK	Alessandro Baroni	14 August 1999 (aged 21)	(Dominican Football Federation) O&M
20	GK	Daniel Campana	2 July 1999 (aged 21)	(Dominican Football Federation) Atlántico
2	DF	Joao Urbáez	24 July 2002 (aged 18)	(Royal Spanish Football Federation) Alcorcón
3	DF	**José Luis de la Cruz**	5 July 2000 (aged 20)	(Royal Spanish Football Federation) Carabanchel
4	DF	**Brian López**	20 November 1999 (aged 21)	(Royal Spanish Football Federation) Atlético Porcuna
5	DF	**Álex Jiménez**	13 January 2002 (aged 19)	(Royal Spanish Football Federation) Cornellà
7	DF	**Edarlyn Reyes**	30 September 1997 (aged 23)	(Bolivian Football Federation) Real Santa Cruz
18	DF	Sebastián Mañón	13 February 2003 (aged 18)	(United States Soccer Federation) Black Rock FC
6	MF	Fabián Messina	16 September 2002 (aged 18)	(German Football Association) 1899 Hoffenheim
8	MF	**Gerard Lavergne**	25 January 1999 (aged 22)	(United States Soccer Federation) FC Tucson
10	MF	**Edison Azcona**	21 November 2003 (aged 17)	(United States Soccer Federation) Inter Miami
13	MF	**Kelvin Martínez**	11 September 1997 (aged 23)	(Dominican Football Federation) Jarabacoa
14	MF	**Juan Carlos Pineda**	12 January 2000 (aged 21)	(Royal Spanish Football Federation) Mirandés
15	MF	José Omar De la Cruz	26 August 2001 (aged 19)	(Royal Spanish Football Federation) Calahorra
9	FW	**Erick Japa**	6 April 1999 (aged 21)	(Dominican Football Federation) Atlético Pantoja
11	FW	**Nowend Lorenzo**	2 November 2002 (aged 18)	(Royal Spanish Football Federation) Osasuna
16	FW	Josué Báez	23 May 2002 (aged 18)	(Dominican Football Federation) Atlético Pantoja
17	FW	**Dorny Romero**	24 January 1998 (aged 23)	(Mexican Football Federation) Venados
19	FW	Rafael Núñez	25 January 2002 (aged 19)	(Royal Spanish Football Federation) Atlético Madrid

== Group B ==
=== Honduras ===
Head coach: (Uruguay) Fabián Coito

The 48-man provisional squad was announced by CONCACAF on 23 February 2021. The 20-man final squad was announced on 8 March 2021.

No.	Pos.	Player	Date of birth (age)	Club
1	GK	Alex Güity	20 September 1997 (aged 23)	(National Autonomous Federation of Football of Honduras) Olimpia
12	GK	Michael Perelló	11 July 1998 (aged 22)	(National Autonomous Federation of Football of Honduras) Real España
18	GK	Enrique Facussé	30 December 1998 (aged 22)	(United States Soccer Federation) University of Kentucky
2	DF	**Denil Maldonado**	26 May 1998 (aged 22)	(Football Federation of Chile) Everton
3	DF	Wesly Decas	11 August 1999 (aged 21)	(National Autonomous Federation of Football of Honduras) Motagua
4	DF	Carlos Meléndez	8 December 1997 (aged 23)	(National Autonomous Federation of Football of Honduras) Vida
5	DF	Cristopher Meléndez	25 November 1997 (aged 23)	(National Autonomous Federation of Football of Honduras) Motagua
16	DF	José Antonio García	21 September 1998 (aged 22)	(National Autonomous Federation of Football of Honduras) Olimpia
6	MF	Jonathan Núñez	26 November 2001 (aged 19)	(National Autonomous Federation of Football of Honduras) Motagua
7	MF	**Alejandro Reyes**	5 November 1997 (aged 23)	(National Autonomous Federation of Football of Honduras) Real España
8	MF	**Edwin Rodríguez**	25 September 1999 (aged 21)	(National Autonomous Federation of Football of Honduras) Olimpia
14	MF	Joseph Rosales	6 November 2000 (aged 20)	(Panamanian Football Federation) Independiente
15	MF	**Kervin Arriaga**	5 January 1998 (aged 23)	(National Autonomous Federation of Football of Honduras) Marathón
17	MF	José Pinto	27 September 1997 (aged 23)	(National Autonomous Federation of Football of Honduras) Olimpia
20	MF	Carlos Argueta	28 February 2002 (aged 19)	(National Autonomous Federation of Football of Honduras) Vida
9	FW	Juan Carlos Obregón	29 October 1997 (aged 23)	(United States Soccer Federation) Rio Grande Valley FC Toros
10	FW	**Rigoberto Rivas**	31 July 1998 (aged 22)	(Italian Football Federation) Reggina
11	FW	**Darixon Vuelto**	15 January 1998 (aged 23)	(National Autonomous Federation of Football of Honduras) Real España
13	FW	Luis Palma	17 January 2000 (aged 21)	(National Autonomous Federation of Football of Honduras) Vida
19	FW	**Douglas Martínez**	5 June 1997 (aged 23)	(United States Soccer Federation) Real Salt Lake

=== Canada ===
Head coach: Mauro Biello

The 50-man provisional squad was announced on 23 February 2021. The 20-man final squad was announced on 10 March 2021. On 19 March, defender Thomas Meilleur-Giguère and forward Kris Twardek were replaced on the roster by Diyaeddine Abzi and Mohamed Farsi for medical reasons.

No.	Pos.	Player	Date of birth (age)	Club
1	GK	James Pantemis	21 February 1997 (aged 24)	(Canadian Soccer Association) CF Montréal
18	GK	Matthew Nogueira	18 March 1998 (aged 23)	(Portuguese Football Federation) Marítimo
19	GK	Sebastian Breza	15 March 1998 (aged 23)	(Italian Football Federation) Bologna
2	DF	**Zachary Brault-Guillard**	30 December 1998 (aged 22)	(Canadian Soccer Association) CF Montréal
3	DF	**Zorhan Bassong**	7 May 1999 (aged 21)	(Canadian Soccer Association) CF Montréal
4	DF	Diyaeddine Abzi	23 November 1998 (aged 22)	(Canadian Soccer Association) York United
5	DF	**Derek Cornelius**	25 November 1997 (aged 23)	(Canadian Soccer Association) Vancouver Whitecaps FC
13	DF	**Marcus Godinho**	28 June 1997 (aged 23)	(German Football Association) FSV Zwickau
16	DF	Callum Montgomery	14 May 1997 (aged 23)	(United States Soccer Federation) Minnesota United
6	MF	Michael Baldisimo	13 April 2000 (aged 20)	(Canadian Soccer Association) Vancouver Whitecaps FC
8	MF	David Norman Jr.	31 May 1998 (aged 22)	(Canadian Soccer Association) Cavalry FC
10	MF	Aidan Daniels	6 September 1998 (aged 22)	(United States Soccer Federation) Colorado Springs Switchbacks
14	MF	Ryan Raposo	5 March 1999 (aged 22)	(Canadian Soccer Association) Vancouver Whitecaps FC
17	MF	Patrick Metcalfe	11 November 1998 (aged 22)	(Canadian Soccer Association) Vancouver Whitecaps FC
20	MF	Lucas Dias	18 January 2003 (aged 18)	(Portuguese Football Federation) Sporting CP
7	FW	Tajon Buchanan	8 February 1999 (aged 22)	(United States Soccer Federation) New England Revolution
9	FW	**Charles-Andreas Brym**	8 August 1998 (aged 22)	(Royal Belgian Football Association) Mouscron
11	FW	**Ballou Tabla**	31 March 1999 (aged 21)	(Canadian Soccer Association) CF Montréal
12	FW	Mohamed Farsi	16 December 1999 (aged 21)	(Canadian Soccer Association) Cavalry FC
15	FW	**Theo Bair**	27 August 1999 (aged 21)	(Canadian Soccer Association) Vancouver Whitecaps FC

=== El Salvador ===
Head coach: (United States) Hugo Pérez

The 33-man provisional squad was announced by CONCACAF on 23 February 2021. The 20-man final squad was announced on 7 March 2021.

No.	Pos.	Player	Date of birth (age)	Club
1	GK	Mario González	20 May 1997 (aged 23)	(Salvadoran Football Federation) Alianza
12	GK	Tomás Romero	19 December 2000 (aged 20)	(United States Soccer Federation) Los Angeles FC
18	GK	Damián Alguera	11 February 2004 (aged 17)	(United States Soccer Federation) San Jose Earthquakes
2	DF	Kevin Menjívar	23 September 2000 (aged 20)	(Salvadoran Football Federation) Once Deportivo
3	DF	Alexis Renderos	1 June 1998 (aged 22)	(Salvadoran Football Federation) Sonsonate
4	DF	Ronald Gómez	22 September 1998 (aged 22)	(Salvadoran Football Federation) Águila
5	DF	Rómulo Villalobos	1 September 1997 (aged 23)	(Salvadoran Football Federation) Once Deportivo
17	DF	Siliazar Henríquez	1 February 1999 (aged 22)	(Salvadoran Football Federation) FAS
19	DF	Lizandro Claros	25 January 1998 (aged 23)	(Salvadoran Football Federation) Luis Angel Firpo
6	MF	Melvin Cartagena	30 July 1999 (aged 21)	(Salvadoran Football Federation) Once Deportivo
7	MF	Elvin Alvarado	23 August 1998 (aged 22)	(Salvadoran Football Federation) Once Deportivo
8	MF	Marcelo Díaz	19 December 2000 (aged 20)	(Salvadoran Football Federation) Alianza
10	MF	Eric Calvillo	2 January 1998 (aged 23)	(United States Soccer Federation) San Jose Earthquakes
13	MF	Ezequiel Rivas	20 May 1998 (aged 22)	(Salvadoran Football Federation) Chalatenango
16	MF	José Portillo	14 November 1999 (aged 21)	(Salvadoran Football Federation) Alianza
20	MF	Fernando Castillo	9 July 1997 (aged 23)	(Salvadoran Football Federation) Isidro Metapán
9	FW	Marvin Márquez	12 March 1998 (aged 23)	(Salvadoran Football Federation) Isidro Metapán
11	FW	Joshua Pérez	21 January 1998 (aged 23)	(Royal Spanish Football Federation) Ibiza
14	FW	Gerber Chávez	15 October 1997 (aged 23)	(Salvadoran Football Federation) Isidro Metapán
15	FW	Enrico Hernández	23 February 2001 (aged 20)	(Royal Dutch Football Association) Vitesse

=== Haiti ===
Head coach: Webens Princimé

The 50-man provisional squad was announced on 21 February 2021. The 20-man final squad was announced on 10 March 2021. Cliford Thomas remplaced a Christopher Attys last minute.

No.	Pos.	Player	Date of birth (age)	Club
1	GK	Marc-Emy Florestal	6 January 2004 (aged 17)	(Haitian Football Federation) Baltimore
12	GK	Alan Jérome	22 August 2000 (aged 20)	(Haitian Football Federation) Don Bosco
20	GK	Pierre Alexandre	25 February 2001 (aged 20)	(French Football Federation) Strasbourg
2	DF	**Djimy Alexis**	8 October 1997 (aged 23)	(Football Federation of Armenia) Lori
3	DF	Odilon Jérôme	7 December 1999 (aged 21)	(Haitian Football Federation) Don Bosco
4	DF	Wendy St. Felix	1 October 1997 (aged 23)	(Haitian Football Federation) Real Hope
13	DF	Martin Expérience	9 March 1999 (aged 22)	(French Football Federation) Avranches
14	DF	Sébastien Lauture	7 April 2000 (aged 20)	(Royal Spanish Football Federation) Cultural Leonesa
15	DF	Denilson Pierre	21 January 1998 (aged 23)	(Haitian Football Federation) Violette
19	DF	Francois Dulysse	13 April 1999 (aged 21)	(United States Soccer Federation) New England Revolution
5	MF	**Bicou Bissainthe**	15 March 1999 (aged 22)	(Haitian Football Federation) Real Hope
6	MF	Eliader Dorlus	12 November 1997 (aged 23)	(Haitian Football Federation) Don Bosco
16	MF	Shelove Archelus	25 September 1999 (aged 21)	(Danish Football Association) Næstved Boldklub
8	MF	Cliford Thomas	9 October 1998 (aged 23)	(Haitian Football Federation) Arcahaie
10	MF	Dutherson Clerveaux	29 January 1999 (aged 22)	(Haitian Football Federation) Cavaly
7	MF	Emmanuel François	25 January 2000 (aged 21)	(French Football Federation) Rodez
17	MF	Danley Jean Jacques	20 May 2000 (aged 20)	(Haitian Football Federation) Don Bosco
9	FW	Karl Andy Bell	20 December 1997 (aged 23)	(Royal Spanish Football Federation) La Virgen del Camino
11	FW	Roberto Louima	3 April 1997 (aged 23)	(Haitian Football Federation) Violette
18	FW	Peterson Joseph	17 December 1997 (aged 23)	(Haitian Football Federation) Tempête
