= 2000 CONCACAF Men's Pre-Olympic Tournament qualification =

North American football tournament

The 2000 CONCACAF Men's Pre-Olympic Tournament qualification determined which five teams qualified for the 2000 CONCACAF Men's Pre-Olympic Tournament.

== First round ==
Team 1	Agg.	Team 2	1st leg	2nd leg
Saint Vincent and the Grenadines	1–9	Trinidad and Tobago	1–5	0–4
Saint Lucia	2–5	Barbados	2–1	1–4
Dominica	1–3	Saint Kitts and Nevis	1–1	0–2
Aruba	1–13	Curaçao	0–6	1–7
Guyana	7–5	Suriname	4–1	3–4
Haiti	3–3	Dominican Republic	3–2	0–1

27 January 1999

Saint Vincent and the Grenadines	1–5	Trinidad and Tobago

Kingstown
28 February 1999

Trinidad and Tobago	4–0	Saint Vincent and the Grenadines

Arima

21 March 1999

Saint Lucia	2–1	Barbados

Castries
11 April 1999

Barbados	4–1	Saint Lucia

Bridgetown

4 July 1999

Dominica	1–1	Saint Kitts and Nevis

Roseau
18 July 1999

Saint Kitts and Nevis	2–0	Dominica

Basseterre

25 July 1999

Aruba	0–6	Curaçao

Oranjestad
15 August 1999

Curaçao	7–1	Aruba

Brievenga

15 August 1999

Guyana	4–1	Suriname

Georgetown
29 August 1999

Suriname	4–3	Guyana

Paramaribo

22 August 1999

Haiti	3–2	Dominican Republic

Port-au-Prince
5 September 1999

Dominican Republic	1–0	Haiti

San Cristobal

== Second round ==
Team 1	Agg.	Team 2	1st leg	2nd leg
El Salvador	2–3	Panama	1–2	1–1
Nicaragua	2–10	Honduras	0–6	2–4
Guyana	1–1	Curaçao	1–1	0–0
Belize	2–9	Guatemala	1–3	1–6
Dominican Republic	0–7	Cuba	0–4	0–3
Saint Kitts and Nevis	3–4	Jamaica	1–3	2–1
Trinidad and Tobago	6–3	Barbados	4–1	2–2

5 September 1999

El Salvador	1–2	Panama

San Salvador
12 September 1999

Panama	1–1	El Salvador

Ciudad de Panama

5 September 1999

Nicaragua	0–6	Honduras

Diriamba
12 September 1999

Honduras	4–2	Nicaragua

San Pedro Sula

12 September 1999

Guyana	1–1	Curaçao

Georgetown
26 September 1999

Curaçao	0–0	Guyana

Willemstad

12 September 1999

Belize	1–3	Guatemala

San Ignacio
19 September 1999

Guatemala	6–1	Belize

Ciudad de GUA

19 September 1999

Dominican Republic	0–4	Cuba

Santo Domingo
24 October 1999

Cuba	3–0	Dominican Republic

La Habana

19 September 1999

Saint Kitts and Nevis	1–3	Jamaica

Basseterre
26 September 1999

Jamaica	2–1	Saint Kitts and Nevis

Kingston

3 October 1999

Trinidad and Tobago	4–1	Barbados

Port of Spain
17 October 1999

Barbados	2–2	Trinidad and Tobago

Bridgetown

== Third round ==
=== Group A ===
Pos	Team	Pld	W	D	L	GF	GA	GD	Pts	Qualification
1	Canada	3	2	1	0	3	0	+3	7	Advance to final round
2	Guatemala	3	1	2	0	9	1	+8	5	Advance to final round
3	Trinidad and Tobago (H)	3	1	1	1	6	2	+4	4	
4	Netherlands Antilles	3	0	0	3	1	16	−15	0	

(H) Hosts
21 March 2000

Canada	0–0	Guatemala

Hasely Crawford Stadium, Port of Spain
21 March 2000

Trinidad and Tobago	3–0	Netherlands Antilles

Hasely Crawford Stadium, Port of Spain

23 March 2000

Canada	1–0	Netherlands Antilles

Hasely Crawford Stadium, Port of Spain
23 March 2000

Trinidad and Tobago	0–0	Guatemala

Hasely Crawford Stadium, Port of Spain

25 March 2000

Guatemala	9–1	Netherlands Antilles

Hasely Crawford Stadium, Port of Spain
25 March 2000

Trinidad and Tobago	0–2	Canada

Hasely Crawford Stadium, Port of Spain

=== Group B ===
Pos	Team	Pld	W	D	L	GF	GA	GD	Pts	Qualification
1	Mexico (H)	3	2	1	0	12	3	+9	7	Advance to final round
2	Honduras	3	1	2	0	5	3	+2	5	Advance to final round
3	Costa Rica	3	1	1	1	4	7	−3	4	
4	Jamaica	3	0	0	3	1	9	−8	0	

(H) Hosts
4 April 2000

Costa Rica	2–1	Jamaica

Estadio Tres de Marzo, Zapopan
4 April 2000

Mexico	2–2	Honduras

Estadio Tres de Marzo, Zapopan

6 April 2000

Costa Rica	1–1	Honduras

Estadio Tres de Marzo, Zapopan
6 April 2000

Mexico	5–0	Jamaica

Estadio Tres de Marzo, Zapopan

8 April 2000

Honduras	2–0	Jamaica

Estadio Tres de Marzo, Zapopan
8 April 2000

Mexico	5–1	Costa Rica

Estadio Tres de Marzo, Zapopan

=== Group C ===
Pos	Team	Pld	W	D	L	GF	GA	GD	Pts	Qualification
1	Panama (H)	2	1	1	0	2	1	+1	4	Advance to final round
2	Cuba	2	0	2	0	1	1	0	2	
3	Bermuda	2	0	1	1	0	1	−1	1	

(H) Hosts
5 April 2000

Panama	1–0	Bermuda

Estadio Rommel Fernández, Panama City

7 April 2000

Bermuda	0–0	Cuba

Estadio Rommel Fernández, Panama City

9 April 2000

Panama	1–1	Cuba

Estadio Rommel Fernández, Panama City
