= El Salvador national under-23 football team =

El Salvador U-23
- Nickname: La Seleccion
- Association: Federación Salvadoreña de Fútbol
- Confederation: CONCACAF (North America)
- Sub-confederation: UNCAF (Central America)
- Head coach: Vacant
- FIFA code: SLV
First colours	Second colours

Olympic Games
- Appearances: 1 (first in 1968)
- Best result: Group stage (1968)

Pan American Games
- Appearances: 2 (first in 1975)
- Best result: Preliminary round (1975, 1987)

The El Salvador national under-23 football team represents El Salvador in international football competitions during Olympic Games and Pan American Games. The team is controlled by the Salvadoran Football Federation. The selection is limited to players under the age of 23, except for three overage players.

== Olympic history ==
At the 1968 CONCACAF Men's Pre-Olympic Tournament, El Salvador passed the first round with an aggregated score of 5–1 against Cuba. For the final round, the national team finished with an aggregate score of 4–1 against Trinidad and Tobago, three of them were scored by Juan Ramón Martínez.

In the 1972 CONCACAF Men's Pre-Olympic Tournament, El Salvador came close to clinching qualification for their second appearance at the Olympic Games. In the first round, the national team got an aggregate score of 2–2 against the United States and an aggregate score of 7–2 against Barbados. The group was tied between El Salvador and the United States, so they had to play in a neutral setting. In regulatory time, the two teams were tied at 0–0. At the end of extra time, the game was tied 1–1 with a goal from Victor Manuel Valencia (112'). The United States advanced after a crucial victory of 6–5 in a penalty shootout. The team was coached by Conrado Miranda.

At the 1976 CONCACAF Men's Pre-Olympic Tournament, El Salvador, at home, surpassed with an aggregate score of 6–1 the preliminary round. In the first round of series B, El Salvador lost with an aggregate score of 1–3 with only goal from Luis Ramírez Zapata.

In the 1980 CONCACAF Men's Pre-Olympic Tournament, El Salvador lost in an aggregate score of 1–2 (0–2,1–0) against Guatemala. The only goal was scored by Alex Cordero. Coached by Raúl Magaña, they did not participate for that Olympics.

In the 1984 CONCACAF Men's Pre-Olympic Tournament, El Salvador lost in an aggregate score of 0–6 (0–2,0–4) against Guatemala. Coached by Contreras Palma, they did not participate for that Olympics.

In the 1988 CONCACAF Men's Pre-Olympic Tournament, El Salvador won in an aggregate score of 4–3 (1–1,3–2) against Panama. They did not participate for that Olympics.

The El Salvador U-23 national football team has failed to qualify for the Olympic Games since it became a specifically under-23 competition during the 1992 Summer Olympics in Barcelona, Spain.

Previously El Salvador had only once participated at the Olympic Games. They achieved this in their first attempt in 1967 when they qualified to the 1968 Summer Olympics. This qualification was achieved after defeating both Cuba and Trinidad & Tobago in the qualifiers.

== Competitive record ==
=== Olympic Games ===
Olympic Games record
Year	Round	Position	Pld	W	D	L	GF	GA	Squad
Until 1988	See El Salvador national football team								
(Spain) 1992	Did not qualify								
(United States) 1996	Did not qualify								
(Australia) 2000	Did not qualify								
(Greece) 2004	Did not qualify								
(China) 2008	Did not qualify								
(United Kingdom) 2012	Did not qualify								
(Brazil) 2016	Did not qualify								
(Japan) 2020	Did not qualify								
(France) 2024	Did not qualify								
Total		0/9							

=== CONCACAF Men's Olympic qualifying tournament ===
CONCACAF Men's Olympic Qualifying Tournament record
Year	Round	Pld	W	D	L	GF	GA
1964	Did not enter						
1968	First place	4	3	0	1	8	3
1972	Play-offs	5	1	2	2	7	7
1976	Round 1	4	1	0	3	6	5
1980	Preliminary round	2	1	0	1	1	2
1984	Preliminary round	2	0	0	2	1	6
1988	Final round	5	1	1	3	7	12
1992	Group stage	6	4	0	1	10	7
(Canada) 1996	Final round	7	2	1	4	9	15
(United States) 2000	Preliminary round	2	0	0	2	2	3
(Mexico) 2004	Second round	2	1	0	1	1	1
(United States) 2008	Preliminary round	2	0	0	2	5	1
(United States) 2012	Third place	6	3	2	1	13	8
(United States) 2015	Preliminary round	3	0	2	1	3	4
(Mexico) 2020	Group stage	3	1	1	1	3	4
Total		53	18	9	25	76	78

=== Pan American Games ===
Pan American Games record
Year	Round	Position	Pld	W	D	L	GF	GA	Squad
Until 1995	See El Salvador national football team								
(Canada) 1999	Did not qualify								
(Dominican Republic) 2003	Did not qualify								
(Brazil) 2007	Did not qualify								
(Mexico) 2011	Did not qualify								
(Canada) 2015	Did not qualify								
(Peru) 2019	Did not qualify								
Total		0/6							

== Schedule and results ==
Win Draw Loss

== Players ==
=== Current squad ===
The following 20 players were called up for the 2020 CONCACAF Men's Olympic Qualifying Championship. The 33-man provisional squad was announced by CONCACAF on 23 February 2021. The 20-man final squad was announced on 7 March 2021.

No.	Pos.	Player	Date of birth (age)	Club
1	GK	Mario González	20 May 1997 (aged 23)	(Salvadoran Football Federation) Alianza
12	GK	Tomás Romero	19 December 2000 (aged 20)	(United States Soccer Federation) Los Angeles FC
18	GK	Damián Alguera	11 February 2004 (aged 17)	(United States Soccer Federation) San Jose Earthquakes
2	DF	Kevin Menjívar	23 September 2000 (aged 20)	(Salvadoran Football Federation) Once Deportivo
3	DF	Alexis Renderos	1 June 1998 (aged 22)	(Salvadoran Football Federation) Sonsonate
4	DF	Ronald Gómez	22 September 1998 (aged 22)	(Salvadoran Football Federation) Águila
5	DF	Rómulo Villalobos	1 September 1997 (aged 23)	(Salvadoran Football Federation) Once Deportivo
17	DF	Siliazar Henríquez	1 February 1999 (aged 22)	(Salvadoran Football Federation) FAS
19	DF	Lizandro Claros	25 January 1998 (aged 23)	(Salvadoran Football Federation) Luis Angel Firpo
6	MF	Melvin Cartagena	30 July 1999 (aged 21)	(Salvadoran Football Federation) Once Deportivo
7	MF	Elvin Alvarado	23 August 1998 (aged 22)	(Salvadoran Football Federation) Once Deportivo
8	MF	Marcelo Díaz	19 December 2000 (aged 20)	(Salvadoran Football Federation) Alianza
10	MF	Eric Calvillo	2 January 1998 (aged 23)	(United States Soccer Federation) San Jose Earthquakes
13	MF	Ezequiel Rivas	20 May 1998 (aged 22)	(Salvadoran Football Federation) Chalatenango
16	MF	José Portillo	14 November 1999 (aged 21)	(Salvadoran Football Federation) Alianza
20	MF	Fernando Castillo	9 July 1997 (aged 23)	(Salvadoran Football Federation) Isidro Metapán
9	FW	Marvin Márquez	12 March 1998 (aged 23)	(Salvadoran Football Federation) Isidro Metapán
11	FW	Joshua Pérez	21 January 1998 (aged 23)	(Royal Spanish Football Federation) Ibiza
14	FW	Gerber Chávez	15 October 1997 (aged 23)	(Salvadoran Football Federation) Isidro Metapán
15	FW	Enrico Hernández	23 February 2001 (aged 20)	(Royal Dutch Football Association) Vitesse

== Coaching staff ==
Position	Staff
Head coach	(El Salvador) Vacant
Assistant coach	(El Salvador) Vacant
Assistant coach	(El Salvador) Vacant
Fitness coach	(El Salvador) Vacant
Goalkeeping coach	(El Salvador) Vacant
Director of Football	(El Salvador) Vacant

== Coaches ==
- (El Salvador) Rigoberto Guzmán (1967–1968)
- (El Salvador) Conrado Miranda (1971–1972)
- (El Salvador) Marcelo Estrada and Rigoberto Guzmán (1976)
- (El Salvador) Raul Magana (1979)
- (El Salvador) Contreras Palma (1983)
- (El Salvador) Raul Magana and (Socialist Federal Republic of Yugoslavia) Milovan Đorić (1987-1988)
- (El Salvador) Óscar Benítez (1991)
- (El Salvador) Víctor Manuel Pacheco (1995–1996)
- (El Salvador) Juan Ramon Paredes (2003)
- (Mexico) Carlos de los Cobos (2007)
- (El Salvador) Mauricio Alfaro (2011–2012)
- (El Salvador) Juan Ramón Sánchez (2015)
- (El Salvador) Rodolfo Góchez (2019–2020)
- (El Salvador) Hugo Pérez (2020–2021)

== Record versus other nations ==
Records for competitive matches only from 1991. As of 03-31-12

Nat	P	W	D	L	GF	GA
Belize	2	2	0	0	5	0
Canada	6	2	1	3	6	10
Costa Rica	3	0	0	3	3	9
Cuba	1	1	0	0	4	0
Guatemala	5	3	1	1	6	5
Honduras	4	0	1	3	3	11
Jamaica	1	1	0	0	3	1
Mexico	1	0	0	1	0	3
Panama	4	1	1	2	5	6
Trinidad and Tobago	3	1	0	2	3	4
United States	1	0	1	0	3	3

== Honours ==
- CONCACAF Olympic Qualifying Championship
  - Third place (1): 2012

== See also ==
- El Salvador national football team
- El Salvador national under-21 football team
- El Salvador national under-20 football team
- El Salvador national under-17 football team
- Federación Salvadoreña de Fútbol
