= 1992 CONCACAF Pre-Olympic Tournament qualification =

North American football tournament

The qualifying competition for the 1992 CONCACAF Pre-Olympic Tournament determined the three teams for the final tournament.

== Preliminary stage ==
=== Caribbean Zone ===
==== First round ====
Team 1	Agg.	Team 2	1st leg	2nd leg
Trinidad and Tobago	Bye	N/A	—	—
Puerto Rico	0–5	Jamaica	0–3	0–2
Haiti	3–3 (a)	Cuba	1–1	2–2
Aruba	3–12	Saint Lucia	3–3	0–9
Antigua and Barbuda	0–5	Barbados	0–0	0–5
Netherlands Antilles	0–1	Suriname	0–1	0–0

28 October 1990

Puerto Rico	0–3	Jamaica

Estadio Sixto Escobar, San Juan (Puerto Rico)
12 November 1990

Jamaica	2–0	Puerto Rico

Independence Park, Kingston

21 October 1990

Haiti	1–1	Cuba

Stade Sylvio Cator, Port-au-Prince
28 October 1990

Cuba	2–2	Haiti

Estadio Pedro Marrero, Havana

28 October 1990

Aruba	3–3	Saint Lucia

Guillermo Prospero Trinidad Stadium, Oranjestad
11 November 1990

Saint Lucia	9–0	Aruba

Mindoo Phillip Park, Castries

29 October 1990

Antigua and Barbuda	0–0	Barbados

Antigua Recreation Ground, St. John's, Antigua and Barbuda
11 November 1990

Barbados	5–0	Antigua and Barbuda

Barbados National Stadium, Bridgetown

21 October 1990

Netherlands Antilles	0–1	Suriname

Ergilio Hato Stadium, Willemstad
4 November 1990

Suriname	0–0	Netherlands Antilles

André Kamperveen Stadion, Paramaribo

==== Second round ====
Team 1	Agg.	Team 2	1st leg	2nd leg	Play-off
Barbados	1–2	Suriname	0–0	1–2	
Trinidad and Tobago	2–2 (5–2 p)	Jamaica	1–0	0–1	1–1 (a.e.t.)
Saint Lucia	2–3	Haiti	1–1	1–2	

17 February 1991

Barbados	0–0	Suriname

Barbados National Stadium, Bridgetown
10 March 1991

Suriname	2–1	Barbados

André Kamperveen Stadion, Paramaribo

24 February 1991

Trinidad and Tobago	1–0	Jamaica

Arima Vélodrome, Arima
3 March 1991

Jamaica	1–0	Trinidad and Tobago

Independence Park, Kingston
24 March 1991

Trinidad and Tobago	1–1 (a.e.t.)	Jamaica
Penalties
	5–2

Estadio Sixto Escobar, San Juan

10 March 1991

Saint Lucia	1–1	Haiti

Mindoo Phillip Park, Castries
24 March 1991

Haiti	2–1	Saint Lucia

Stade Sylvio Cator, Port-au-Prince

=== Central American Zone ===
Team 1	Agg.	Team 2	1st leg	2nd leg
Guatemala	2–4	Honduras	2–2	0–2
Belize	0–5	El Salvador	0–2	0–3
Panama	w/o	Costa Rica	—	—

17 March 1991

Guatemala	2–2	Honduras

Estadio Doroteo Guamuch Flores, Guatemala City
3 April 1991

Honduras	2–0	Guatemala

Estadio Nacional Chelato Uclés, Tegucigalpa

17 March 1991

Belize	0–2	El Salvador

MCC Grounds (stadium), Belize City
24 March 1991

El Salvador	3–0	Belize

Estadio Cuscatlán, San Salvador

Panama	w/o	Costa Rica

- Costa Rica were disqualified for fielding overage players.

== Intermediary round ==
Each zone were granted three spots in the third round. The group winners and the best runner-up qualified for the final round.

=== Group A ===
Pos	Team	Pld	W	D	L	GF	GA	GD	Pts	Qualification
1	Honduras	4	3	1	0	6	1	+5	7	Advance to final round
2	Mexico	4	1	2	1	8	3	+5	4	Advance to final round
3	Suriname	4	0	1	3	1	11	−10	1	

Source: RSSSF
1 September 1991

Suriname	1–1	Mexico

André Kamperveen Stadion, Paramaribo
5 September 1991

Honduras	1–1	Mexico

Estadio Nacional Chelato Uclés, Tegucigalpa
11 September 1991

Mexico	0–1	Honduras

Estadio Nemesio Díez, Toluca
18 September 1991

Mexico	6–0	Suriname

Estadio Ciudad de los Deportes, México City
24 September 1991

Honduras	2–0	Suriname

Estadio Nacional Chelato Uclés, Tegucigalpa
6 October 1991

Suriname	0–2	Honduras

André Kamperveen Stadion, Paramaribo

=== Group B ===
Pos	Team	Pld	W	D	L	GF	GA	GD	Pts	Qualification
1	Canada	4	3	0	1	11	4	+7	6	Advance to final round
2	El Salvador	4	2	0	2	5	7	−2	4	
3	Trinidad and Tobago	4	1	0	3	3	8	−5	2	

Source: RSSSF
5 May 1991

Canada	3–0	Trinidad and Tobago

Swangard Stadium, Burnaby
12 May 1991

El Salvador	3–1	Canada

Estadio Cuscatlán, San Salvador
19 May 1991

Trinidad and Tobago	1–3	Canada

Hasely Crawford Stadium, Port of Spain
14 July 1991

El Salvador	2–0 Awarded	Trinidad and Tobago
	w/o

Estadio Cuscatlán, San Salvador
- Trinidad and Tobago did not report for the match. El Salvador were awarded a 2–0 victory.
28 July 1991

Trinidad and Tobago	2–0	El Salvador

Hasely Crawford Stadium, Port of Spain
31 August 1991

Canada	4–0	El Salvador

Swangard Stadium, Burnaby

=== Group C ===
Pos	Team	Pld	W	D	L	GF	GA	GD	Pts	Qualification
1	United States	4	3	1	0	18	2	+16	7	Advance to final round
2	Panama	3	0	2	1	4	10	−6	2	Withdrew
3	Haiti	3	0	1	2	2	12	−10	1	

Source: RSSSF
23 June 1991

United States	8–0	Haiti

Martin 'Ed' Ragain Field, Colorado Springs
14 July 1991

Panama	1–1	United States

Estadio Rommel Fernández, Panama City
20 July 1991

United States	7–1	Panama

High School Stadium, Dublin
25 August 1991

Haiti	0–2	United States

Stade Sylvio Cator, Port-au-Prince
21 September 1991

Panama	2–2	Haiti

Estadio Rommel Fernández, Panama City
1 October 1991

Haiti	Not played	Panama

Stade Sylvio Cator, Port-au-Prince

The Haiti v Panama match was not played as Panama withdrew from the competition, and Haiti were already eliminated (they could at best finish second in the group, and were unable to surpass Mexico in the ranking of second-placed teams).

=== Ranking of second-placed teams ===
Pos	Grp	Team	Pld	W	D	L	GF	GA	GD	Pts	Qualification
1	A	Mexico	4	1	2	1	8	3	+5	4	Advance to final round
2	B	El Salvador	4	2	0	2	5	7	−2	4	
3	C	Panama	3	0	2	1	3	10	−7	2	

Source: RSSSF
Rules for classification: 1) Points; 2) Goal difference; 3) Goals scored.
