= Julio Sibrián =

Salvadoran footballer

Personal information
- Full name: Julio Enrique Sibrián Molina
- Date of birth: 17 July 1996 (age 30)
- Place of birth: La Libertad, El Salvador
- Height: 1.84 m (6 ft 0 in)
- Position: Centre-back

Team information
- Current team: Águila
- Number: 2

Senior career*
Years	Team	Apps	(Gls)
2014–2015	Turín FESA		
2015–2016	FAS	0	(0)
2016–2017	Quequeisque		
2017–2020	Sonsonate	53	(3)
2020–2022	Once Deportivo	77	(0)
2022–	Águila	137	(5)

International career^{‡}
2012	El Salvador U17	4	(0)
2021–	El Salvador	29	(0)
- * Club domestic league appearances and goals as of 18:55, 27 December 2023 (UTC) ‡ National team caps and goals as of 18:55, 27 December 2023 (UTC)

Julio Enrique Sibrián Molina (born 17 July 1995) is a Salvadoran professional footballer who plays as a centre-back for Primera División club Águila and captains the El Salvador national team.

== International career ==
Sibrián debuted for the El Salvador national team in a 2–0 2022 FIFA World Cup qualification win over Grenada on 25 March 2021. He was an emergency callup to El Salvador for the 2021 CONCACAF Gold Cup after Rómulo Villalobos had to withdraw due to injury.
