= Jabari Hylton =

Jamaican footballer (born 1998)

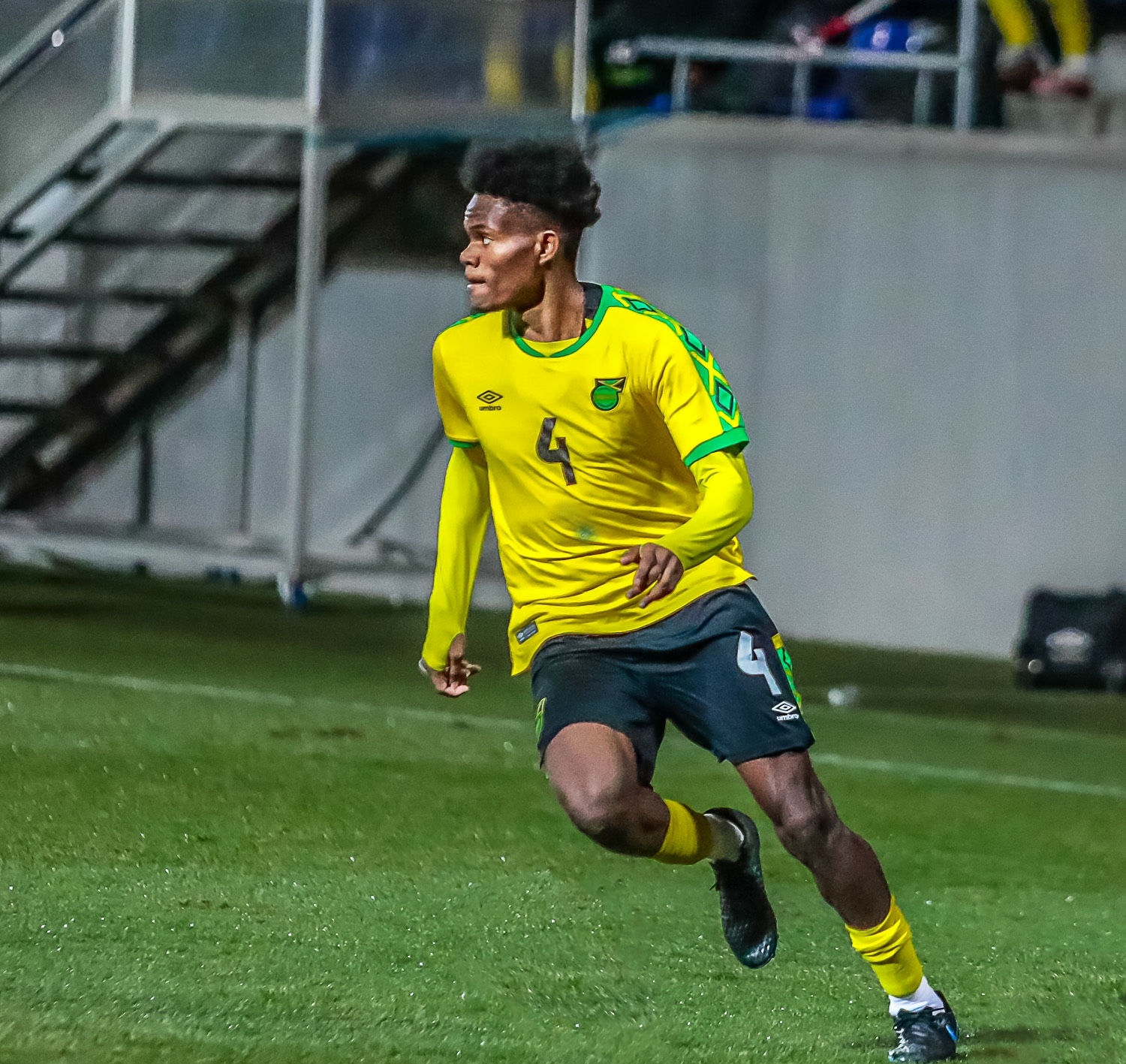
- Jabari in action for Jamaica on his debut in March 2021

Personal information
- Full name: Jabari Hylton
- Date of birth: 5 November 1998 (age 27)
- Place of birth: Atlanta, Georgia, U.S.
- Height: 1.75 m (5 ft 9 in)
- Position: Forward

Youth career
- 2007–2012: Oxford United
- 2012–2015: Swindon Town
- 2016–2017: West Ham Foundation Academy

Senior career*
Years	Team	Apps	(Gls)
2017	Histon	3	(0)
2019–2021	UWI	23	(5)
2021	Pensacola FC	11	(10)
2022	C.D. Once Deportivo	13	(2)

International career^{‡}
2014	Jamaica U17	4	(1)
2021–	Jamaica	1	(0)
- * Club domestic league appearances and goals as of 00:01, 9 December 2022 (UTC) ‡ National team caps and goals as of 00:01, 9 December 2022 (UTC)

Jabari Hylton (born 5 November 1998) is a footballer who last played for C.D. Once Deportivo of the Salvadoran Primera Division. Born in the United States, he has represented Jamaica internationally.

== Career statistics ==
=== Club ===
As of 9 December 2022.

Club	Season	League			Cup		Other		Total	
Club	Season	Division	Apps	Goals	Apps	Goals	Apps	Goals	Apps	Goals
Histon FC	2016–17	Southern Football League	3	0	0	0	0	0	3	0
UWI FC	2018–19	National Premier League	1	0	0	0	0	0	1	0
UWI FC	2019–20	National Premier League	22	5	0	0	0	0	22	5
Pensacola FC	2021	National Premier Soccer League	11	10	0	0	0	0	11	10
C.D. Once Deportivo	2022	Salvadoran Primera Division	13	2	-	-	-	-	13	2
Career total			50	17	0	0	0	0	50	17

=== International ===
As of 9 December 2022.

National team	Year	Apps	Goals
Jamaica	2021	1	0
Total		1	0
