= Hersheypark Stadium =

Stadium in Hershey, Pennsylvania

Coordinates: 40.29012°N 76.658134°W

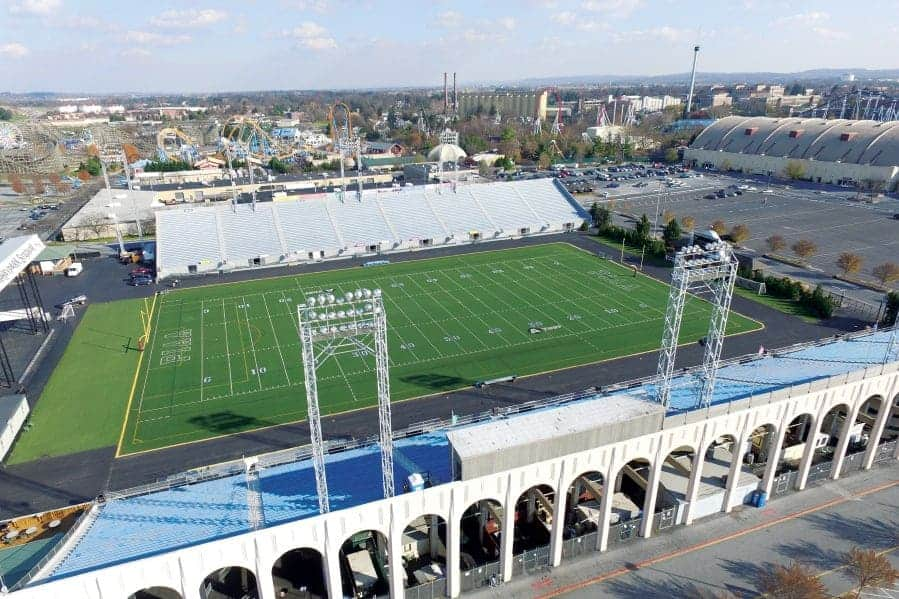
- Interactive map of Hersheypark Stadium
- Former names: Hershey Sports Stadium
- Location: Hershey, Pennsylvania
- Owner: Hershey Entertainment & Resorts Company
- Operator: Hershey Entertainment & Resorts Company
- Capacity: 15,641 Soccer & Football; 30,000 Concerts
- Surface: A-Turf Premier XP

Construction
- Groundbreaking: 1937
- Built: 1937–1939
- Opened: May 18, 1939
- Expanded: 1940
- Cost: $1.5 million

Tenants
- Hershey Wildcats (A-League) (1997–2001); Hershey FC (NPSL) (2013–present)

Hersheypark Stadium is a stadium in Hershey, Pennsylvania, on the grounds of Hersheypark. It opened on May 18, 1939.

It is used as a sporting facility, concert venue and location for various other large functions (including a birthday gala for President Dwight D. Eisenhower).

As a concert venue it was played by the Grateful Dead on June 28, 1985 and, as it was raining for the whole of the band's performance, Jerry Garcia (unusually) wore a jacket over his t-shirt all the while he was onstage.

It also hosts the Tournament of Bands Atlantic Coast Championship marching band competition every November. It formerly hosted the Cavalcade of Bands championship competition.

The Philadelphia Eagles held its preseason training camp at the stadium from 1951 to 1963 and 1965 to 1967.

The stadium hosted the final round of the 2000 CONCACAF Men's Pre-Olympic Tournament for the 2000 Summer Olympics. Two berths were afforded for the Olympics for CONCACAF members, and the United States and Honduras qualified by winning their semi-final matches in the qualification tournament. The stadium has hosted the U.S. men's national soccer team on one occasion, a 3–1 victory over Poland on May 9, 1990.

== Ice hockey ==
Hersheypark Stadium hosted the fourth annual AHL Outdoor Classic in 2013, with the local Hershey Bears facing the Wilkes-Barre/Scranton Penguins. The "Baby Pens" defeated the Bears in front of a capacity crowd of 17,311 fans by a score of 2–1.

Date	Away team	Score	Home team	Attendance
January 20, 2013	Wilkes-Barre/Scranton Penguins	2–1 (OT)	Hershey Bears	17,311
January 20, 2018	Lehigh Valley Phantoms	5–2	Hershey Bears	13,091

== International soccer ==
Date	Teams	Competition	Attendance
May 9, 1990	United States 3–0 Poland	International Friendly	–
April 22, 1999	United States 2–1 China	Women's International Friendly	15,257
April 21, 2000	United States 3–0 Honduras	2000 CONCACAF Men's Pre-Olympic Tournament Group D	–
April 23, 2000	Canada 0–2 Honduras	2000 CONCACAF Men's Pre-Olympic Tournament Group D	–
April 25, 2000	Canada 0–0 United States	2000 CONCACAF Men's Pre-Olympic Tournament Group D	–
April 28, 2000	United States 3–0 Guatemala	2000 CONCACAF Men's Pre-Olympic Tournament Semi-finals	–
April 28, 2000	Honduras 0–0 Mexico (5–4 p)	2000 CONCACAF Men's Pre-Olympic Tournament Semi-finals	–
April 30, 2000	Guatemala 0–5 Mexico	2000 CONCACAF Men's Pre-Olympic Tournament Third place	–
April 30, 2000	United States 1–2 Honduras	2000 CONCACAF Men's Pre-Olympic Tournament Final	–
June 23, 2000	United States 11–0 Trinidad and Tobago	2000 CONCACAF Women's Gold Cup	10,483

== Events ==
List of events held at the Stadium
Artist	Event	Date	Opening act(s)	Attendance
10,000 Maniacs	Our Time in Eden Tour	June 29, 1993	World Party	
Aerosmith	Back in the Saddle Tour	January 3, 1985	Poison Dollies	
Aerosmith	Done with Mirrors Tour	April 10, 1986	Ted Nugent	
Aerosmith	Pump Tour	January 28, 1990	Skid Row	
Aerosmith	Get a Grip Tour	August 10, 1994	Jackyl	
Aerosmith	Nine Lives Tour	July 31, 1997	Jonny Lang	
Aerosmith	Just Push Play Tour	June 22, 2001	Fuel	
Aerosmith	Girls of Summer Tour	August 17, 2002	Kid Rock & Run–D.M.C.	
Aerosmith	Honkin' on Bobo Tour	June 26, 2004	Cheap Trick	
Alabama	Farewell Tour	August 15, 2003	—N/a	
Alanis Morissette	Can't Not Tour	August 26, 1996	Radiohead	
—	All That! Music and More Festival	August 20, 2000	—N/a	
Ariana Grande	The Honeymoon Tour	July 26, 2015	Prince Royce	
Avril Lavigne	Greatest Hits Tour	June 7, 2025	We the Kings & Simple Plan	
Backstreet Boys	Black & Blue Tour	July 5, 2001	Shaggy & Krystal Harris	
Backstreet Boys	DNA World Tour	~~August 18, 2019~~^{1} September 16, 2019	Baylee Littrell	
Barry Manilow	Big Fun Tour de Force	August 12, 1988	—N/a	
The Beach Boys	Love You Tour	August 30, 1977	Ricci Martin	
The Beach Boys	The Beach Boys Tour	July 29, 1985	John Cafferty & The Beaver Brown Band	
The Beach Boys	1991 Tour	July 28, 1991	The Everly Brothers	
Beyoncé	The Formation World Tour	June 12, 2016	DJ Khaled	26,662 / 26,662
Big Time Rush & Victoria Justice	Summer Break Tour	July 19, 2013	Jackson Guthy & Olivia Somerlyn	
Billy Joel	2008 Tour	July 10, 2008	—N/a	
Black Sabbath	1999 Reunion Tour	August 12, 1999	Godsmack & Drain STH	
Blink-182	Blink-182 in Concert	August 12, 2009	Fall Out Boy, Panic! at the Disco & Chester French	
Blink-182	California Tour	August 27, 2016	A Day To Remember, All Time Low, DJ Spider	
Blink-182	Blink-182 and Lil Wayne Tour	July 5, 2019	Lil Wayne, Neck Deep	
Blink-182	World Tour 2023/2024	May 27, 2023	Turnstile & White Reaper	
Blink-182 & My Chemical Romance	10th Annual Honda Civic Tour	August 13, 2011	Manchester Orchestra	
Bon Jovi	Slippery When Wet Tour	July 23, 1987	Keel	
Bon Jovi	New Jersey Syndicate Tour	June 17, 1989	Skid Row	
Bon Jovi	One Wild Night Tour	July 22, 2001	Eve 6	
Bon Jovi	The Circle Tour	May 19, 2010	Fuel & Charm City Devils	
Brandon Lake & Phil Wickham	Summer Worship Nights Tour	July 18, 2025	Josiah Queen	
Breaking Benjamin, Chevelle, Three Days Grace, Dorothy, & Diamante	105.7 The X Summerfest	July 27, 2019	—N/a	
Britney Spears	Oops!... I Did It Again Tour	June 24, 2000	A-Teens, BBMak & Innosense	
Brooks & Dunn	Waitin' on Sundown Tour	July 5, 1994	Faith Hill & Wade Hayes	
Brooks & Dunn	Tight Rope Tour	July 28, 2000	Lonestar & Andy Griggs	
Brooks & Dunn	Neon Circus & Wild West Show Tour	July 27, 2002	Dwight Yoakam, Gary Allan, Chris Cagle & Trick Pony	
Brooks & Dunn	Neon Circus & Wild West Show Tour	July 11, 2003	Rascal Flatts, Brad Paisley, Aaron Lines & Jeff Bates	
Brooks & Dunn	Neon Circus & Wild West Show Tour	September 24, 2005	Big & Rich, The Warren Brothers & Cowboy Troy	
Bruce Springsteen & The E Street Band	Magic Tour	August 19, 2008	—N/a	
Bruce Springsteen & The E Street Band	Working on a Dream Tour	May 15, 2009	—N/a	29,745 / 29,745
Bruce Springsteen & The E Street Band	High Hopes Tour	May 14, 2014	—N/a	28,398 / 30,261
Bruno Mars	The Moonshine Jungle Tour	July 12, 2014	Aloe Blacc	27,351 / 27,351
Bush	Razorblade Suitcase Tour	July 4, 1997	Veruca Salt, The Jesus Lizard & Souls	
Chris Brown	Breezy Bowl XX	August 5, 2025	Summer Walker & Bryson Tiller	27,168 / 27,168
Chris Stapleton	All-American Road Show Tour	August 27, 2022	Elle King & Morgan Wade	
Coldplay	Viva la Vida Tour	May 24, 2009	Pete Yorn & Howling Bells	10,414 / 13,530
Counting Crows	Recovering the Satellites Tour	July 15, 1997	The Wallflowers	
Counting Crows	Saturday Nights & Sunday Mornings Tour	August 5, 2008	Maroon 5 & Sara Bareilles	
Counting Crows	Saturday Nights & Sunday Mornings Tour	August 6, 2008	Maroon 5 & Sara Bareilles	
Counting Crows & Live	25 Years and Counting Tour	August 10, 2018	—N/a	
Creed	Human Clay Tour	May 21, 2000	Sevendust & Finger Eleven	
Creed	Weathered Tour	August 24, 2002	Jerry Cantrell & 12 Stones	
Creed	Full Circle Reunion Tour	August 9, 2009	Skillet & Like a Storm	
Crosby, Stills & Nash	Daylight Again Tour	August 10, 1982	Kansas	
Crosby, Stills & Nash	1987 Tour	July 3, 1987	—N/a	
Crosby, Stills, Nash & Young	Freedom of Speech Tour	August 25, 2006	—N/a	
Dave Matthews Band	Crash Tour	September 29, 1996	Soul Coughing	
Dave Matthews Band	Before These Crowded Streets Tour	July 29, 1998	Agents of Good Roots	
Dave Matthews Band	1999 Tour	August 4, 1999	Boy Wonder	
Dave Matthews Band	2000 Tour	August 23, 2000	The Getaway People	
Dave Matthews Band	Everyday Tour	August 1, 2001	Corey Harris & The 5x5	
Dave Matthews Band	Busted Stuff Tour	July 21, 2002	Norah Jones	
Dave Matthews Band	2003 Tour	September 11, 2003	North Mississippi Allstars	
Dave Matthews Band	2004 Tour	July 10, 2004	Galactic	
Dave Matthews Band	Stand Up Tour	June 25, 2005	Blue Merle	
Dave Matthews Band	2006 Tour	June 23, 2006	O.A.R.	
Dave Matthews Band	2008 Tour	June 27, 2008	The Black Crowes	
Dave Matthews Band	Big Whiskey & the GrooGrux King Tour	July 24, 2009	Jason Mraz	
Dave Matthews Band	2010 Tour	July 9, 2010	Zac Brown Band	
Dave Matthews Band	Away from the World Tour	June 29, 2012	The Head and the Heart	
Dave Matthews Band	2013 Tour	July 13, 2013	Kool & the Gang	
David Bowie	Serious Moonlight Tour	August 29, 1983	—N/a	
David Bowie & Nine Inch Nails	Dissonance/Outside Tour Tour	September 17, 1995	Prick	
Def Leppard	Yeah! Tour	July 3, 2006	Journey & Stoll Vaughan	
Def Leppard	Downstage Thrust Tour	August 12, 2007	Styx & Foreigner	
Def Leppard	Mirrorball Tour	July 3, 2011	Heart & Evan Watson	
Def Leppard	Rock of Ages Tour	August 15, 2012	Poison & Lita Ford	
Def Leppard & Journey	Def Leppard & Journey 2018 Tour	May 25, 2018	—N/a	
Def Leppard & Journey	The Summer Stadium Tour	July 25, 2024	Steve Miller Band	
Def Leppard & Mötley Crüe	The Stadium Tour	July 12, 2022	Joan Jett & The Blackhearts & Poison	
Demi Lovato & Nick Jonas	Future Now Tour	July 16, 2016	Mike Posner	11,756 / 19,611
Destiny's Child	Total Request Live Tour	July 24, 2001	—N/a	15,000 / 29,100
Destiny's Child	Destiny Fulfilled... and Lovin' It	August 7, 2005	Mario, Amerie & Tyra Bolling	
~~Disturbed~~	~~The Sickness 20th Anniversary Tour~~	~~August 1, 2020~~ Cancelled – see COVID-19 pandemic	~~Staind & Bad Wolves~~	
Eagles	Hell Freezes Over Reunion Tour	September 14, 1994	—N/a	
Emerson, Lake & Powell	Emerson, Lake & Powell Tour	September 25, 1986	—N/a	
Fall Out Boy	Mania Tour	September 1, 2018	Machine Gun Kelly; Against the Current	
Fall Out Boy & Paramore	Monumentour	July 19, 2014	New Politics	
—	Farm Aid	September 22, 2012	—N/a	
Fleetwood Mac	Say You Will Tour	June 12, 2004	—N/a	
Florida Georgia Line	Smooth Tour	July 22, 2017	Chris Lane, & Morgan Wallen	
Florida Georgia Line	Can't Say I Ain't Country Tour	August 17, 2019	Dan + Shay, Morgan Wallen, & Canaan Smith	
Foo Fighters	Everything or Nothing at All Tour	July 23, 2024	The Hives; Amyl and the Sniffers	
—	Further Festival	July 11, 1997	—N/a	
George Strait	It Just Comes Natural Tour	January 18, 2007	Ronnie Milsap & Taylor Swift	
George Thorogood & The Destroyers	Maverick Tour	August 2, 1985	Johnny Winter	
George Thorogood and The Destroyers & Little Feat	1992 Tour	August 11, 1992	—N/a	
Gin Blossoms	1994 Tour	July 18, 1994	Cracker & Vinx	
Gloria Estefan	Into the Light Tour	September 8, 1991	—N/a	
Grateful Dead	1985 Tour	June 28, 1985	—N/a	
Green Day	The Saviors Tour	September 2, 2024 (Note: Originally scheduled for August 10, but was postponed due to Armstrong losing his voice.)	The Smashing Pumpkins; Rancid; The Linda Lindas	
Green Day, Fall Out Boy, & Weezer	Hella Mega Tour	August 13, 2021	The Interrupters	—N/a
Guns N' Roses	Use Your Illusion Tour	June 11, 1991	Skid Row	—N/a
Guns N' Roses	Not in This Lifetime... Tour	August 13, 2017	Live	31,087 / 31,087
Guns N' Roses	Guns N' Roses 2020 Tour	July 31, 2021	Mammoth WVH	23,908 / 25,000
Guns N' Roses	Guns N' Roses 2023 Tour	August 11, 2023	The Pretenders	—N/a
—	H.O.R.D.E.	August 23, 1996	—N/a	
Hanson	Albertane Tour	August 15, 1998	Admiral Twin	—N/a
Harry Styles	Harry Styles: Live on Tour	June 14, 2018	Kacey Musgraves	15,468 / 15,468
Hootie & The Blowfish	Group Therapy Tour	August 30, 2019	Barenaked Ladies	—N/a
Imagine Dragons	Evolve World Tour	June 16, 2018	Grace VanderWaal	30,440 / 30,632
Imagine Dragons	Mercury World Tour	August 12, 2022	Macklemore & Kings Elliot	27,916 / 27,916
Janet Jackson	Janet World Tour	July 3, 1994	—N/a	
Janet Jackson	State of the World Tour	July 20, 2018	—N/a	6,985 / 6,985
Janet Jackson	Together Again	July 6, 2024	Nelly	14,323 / 18,526
Jason Aldean	Night Train Tour	August 10, 2013	Jake Owen, Thomas Rhett & DeeJay Silver	
Jason Aldean	Burn It Down Tour	May 30, 2015	Cole Swindell, Tyler Farr, & DeeJay Silver	
Jason Aldean	Six String Circus Tour	September 15, 2017	Thomas Rhett, A Thousand Horses & Dee Jay Silver	
Jay Z & Justin Timberlake	Legends of the Summer Stadium Tour	August 4, 2013	DJ Cassidy	
John Mayer	Continuum Tour	July 21, 2007	Ben Folds & James Morrison	
John Mayer	Battle Studies World Tour	August 5, 2010	Train	
John Mellencamp	Cuttin' Heads Tour	September 15, 2001	The Wallflowers	
Jonas Brothers	2010 World Tour	August 14, 2010	Demi Lovato	
Jonas Brothers	Happiness Begins Tour	August 31, 2019	Bebe Rexha & Jordan McGraw	
Jonas Brothers	Remember This Tour	September 24, 2021	Kelsea Ballerini & Jordan McGraw	
Jonas Brothers	Jonas 20: Living the Dream Tour	August 17, 2025	The All-American Rejects & Marshmello	
Journey	Classic Rock's Main Event Tour	August 1, 2003	Styx & REO Speedwagon	
Journey	Revelation Tour	August 28, 2008	Cheap Trick & Heart	
Journey	Eclipse Tour	August 16, 2011	Foreigner & Night Ranger	
Judas Priest	Mercenaries of Metal Tour	August 10, 1988	Cinderella	
Justin Timberlake	The Forget Tomorrow World Tour	July 4, 2024		
Kelly Clarkson	Piece by Piece Tour	July 11, 2015	Pentatonix, Eric Hutchinson & Abi Ann	
Kendrick Lamar	The Championship Tour	June 2, 2018	Top Dawg Entertainment Artists	
Kendrick Lamar & SZA	Grand National Tour	June 16, 2025	Mustard	28,045 / 28,045
Kenny Chesney	No Shoes, No Shirt, No Problems Tour	June 21, 2002	Montgomery Gentry, Jamie O'Neal & Phil Vassar	
Kenny Chesney	The Road and the Radio Tour	May 28, 2006	Uncle Kracker, Sugarland & Jake Owen	
Kesha & Macklemore	The Adventures of Kesha and Macklemore	July 21, 2018	—N/a	
Kid Rock & Twisted Brown Trucker	Rock 'n' Rebels II Tour	July 31, 2009	Lynyrd Skynyrd & Black Stone Cherry	
Kid Rock & Twisted Brown Trucker	Born Free Part II Tour	July 10, 2011	Sheryl Crow	
KISS	Kiss Farewell Tour	July 5, 2000	Ted Nugent & Skid Row	
KISS	Rock the Nation Tour	July 18, 2004	Poison & ZO2	
KISS	The Hottest Show on Earth Tour	July 31, 2010	The Academy Is... & The Feens	
KISS	End of the Road World Tour	August 21, 2019	—N/a	
Kiss & Aerosmith	AeroKiss Tour	August 31, 2003	Saliva	
—	Lilith Fair	August 10, 1998	—N/a	
—	Lilith Fair	July 31, 1999	—N/a	
Lady Gaga	The Chromatica Ball	August 28, 2022	—N/a	
~~Linkin Park~~	~~One More Light World Tour~~	~~July 30, 2017~~; Cancelled – see death of Chester Bennginton	~~Blink-182 & Machine Gun Kelly~~	
Live	Throwing Copper Tour	July 21, 1995	Catherine Wheel & Buffalo Tom	
Live	Secret Samadhi Tour	July 25, 1997	Luscious Jackson & The Jellybricks	
Live	The Distance to Here Tour	August 26, 2000	Counting Crows & Galactic	
Luke Bryan	Kill The Lights Tour	June 4, 2016	Little Big Town & Dustin Lynch	
Luke Bryan	Huntin', Fishin' and Lovin' Every Day Tour	June 23, 2017	Brett Eldredge & Lauren Alaina	
Luke Bryan	Sunset Repeat Tour	June 6, 2019	Cole Swindell & Jon Langston	
Lynyrd Skynyrd	2006 Tour	July 16, 2006	3 Doors Down & Shooter Jennings	
Lynyrd Skynyrd	The Last of the Street Survivors Farewell Tour	July 28, 2018	Blackberry Smoke; Tom Hambridge; Hank Williams Jr.	
Lynyrd Skynyrd & ZZ Top	Sharp Dressed Simple Man Tour	September 9, 2023	Uncle Kracker	
Maroon 5	Maroon V Tour	August 15, 2015	Nick Jonas; Matt McAndrew	
Maroon 5	2021 Tour	September 5, 2021	blackbear Ava Max	
Matchbox 20	Mad Season Tour	August 15, 2001	Train & Seven Mary Three	
Matchbox 20 & Counting Crows	A Brief History Of Everything Tour	August 28, 2017	—N/a	
Megadeth	Cryptic Writings Tour	March 16, 1998	Life of Agony & Coal Chamber	
Michael Bolton	My Secret Passion: The Arias Tour	June 12, 1998	Wynonna Judd	
The Moody Blues	Octave Tour	November 24, 1978	Jimmie Spheeris	
The Moody Blues	Sur la Mer Tour	August 5, 1988	John Kilzer Band	
Morgan Wallen	One Night at a Time World Tour	May 9, 2024	Ernest & Bailey Zimmerman	
*NSYNC	Boys of Summer Tour	July 23, 1999	Jordan Knight & The Sugarhill Gang	
*NSYNC	No Strings Attached Tour	July 30, 2000	Sisqó & P!nk	
*NSYNC	PopOdyssey Tour	May 26, 2001	3LW, BBMak & Tonya Mitchell	
*NSYNC	PopOdyssey Tour	May 28, 2001	3LW, BBMak & Tonya Mitchell	
Neil Young & Crazy Horse	Broken Arrow Tour	August 23, 1996	—N/a	
Neil Young & The Friends and Relatives	Silver & Gold Tour	August 11, 2000	The Pretenders & Tegan and Sara	
New Kids on The Block	Mixtape Tour	July 6, 2019	Salt-N-Pepa, Tiffany, Debbie Gibson, & Naughty By Nature	
Nickelback	All the Right Reasons Tour	July 14, 2007	Staind & Daughtry	
Nickelback	Dark Horse Tour	July 17, 2009	Hinder, Papa Roach & Saving Abel	
Nickelback	Dark Horse Tour	September 25, 2010	Three Days Grace & Buckcherry	
Nickelback	Here and Now Tour	July 14, 2012	Bush, Seether & My Darkest Days	
Nickelback	Feed The Machine Tour	August 5, 2017	Daughtry & Shaman's Harvest	
NKOTBSB	NKOTBSB Tour	July 30, 2011	Matthew Morrison	
One Direction	Take Me Home Tour	July 5, 2013	5 Seconds of Summer	
One Direction	Take Me Home Tour	July 6, 2013	5 Seconds of Summer	
—	Outlaw Music Festival	September 10, 2017	—N/a	
Paul McCartney	One on One Tour	July 19, 2016	—N/a	
Pearl Jam	Riot Act Tour	July 12, 2003	Sleater-Kinney	
Pentatonix	PTX Summer Tour 2018	September 2, 2018	Echosmith; Calum Scott	
Phil Collins	Both Sides of the World Tour	July 9, 1994	—N/a	
Phish	Billy Breathes Tour	August 14, 1996	—N/a	
Phish	Farmhouse Tour	September 15, 2000	—N/a	
Phish	Joy Tour	June 13, 2010	—N/a	
Phish	2021 Summer Tour	August 10 & 11, 2021	—N/a	
Pink	P!NK: Summer Carnival	October 1, 2024	Sheryl Crow; KidCutUp; The Script	
Poison	Flesh & Blood Tour	June 7, 1991	Slaughter & BulletBoys	
Poison	20th Anniversary Tour	July 20, 2006	Cinderella & Endeverafter	
The Police	The Police Reunion Tour	July 20, 2007	Fiction Plane	
Post Malone & Jelly Roll	Big Ass Stadium Tour	May 28, 2025	Sierra Ferrell	
R.E.M.	Monster Tour	September 30, 1995	Radiohead	
Rascal Flatts	American Living Unstoppable Tour	August 29, 2009	Darius Rucker	
Rascal Flatts & Journey	Live & Loud Tour	August 1, 2013	The Band Perry & Cassadee Pope	
~~Rascal Flatts & Rick Springfield~~	~~Riot Tour~~	~~August 22, 2015~~; Cancelled	~~Ashley Monroe~~	
Reba McEntire & Martina McBride	Girl's Night Out Tour	August 6, 2001	Sara Evans, Jamie O'Neal & Carolyn Dawn Johnson	
Red Hot Chili Peppers	Californication Tour	July 17, 2000	Foo Fighters & Blonde Redhead	
REO Speedwagon	Wheels Are Turnin' Tour	June 19, 1985	Cheap Trick	
Rihanna	Last Girl on Earth Tour	August 21, 2010	Kesha & Travie McCoy	
Robert Plant	Now and Zen Tour	July 24, 1988	Cheap Trick (scheduled)	
—	Rock Allegiance Festival	September 1, 2012	—N/a	
Rod Stewart	Out of Order Tour	June 9, 1989	Tommy Conwell & The Young Rumblers	
Rod Stewart	A Night to Remember Tour	September 28, 1993	Patti Smith	
Rod Stewart	A Spanner in the Works Tour	May 18, 1996	—N/a	
Rod Stewart	Human Tour	July 28, 2001	—N/a	
The Rolling Stones	A Bigger Bang Tour	October 1, 2005	Beck	
Rush	Snakes & Arrows Tour	July 17, 2008	—N/a	
Sammy Hagar & The Waboritas	Heavyweight Champs of Rock 'n' Roll Tour	August 14, 2002	David Lee Roth	
Shania Twain	Come on Over Tour	May 30, 1999	Leahy	
Shania Twain	Queen of Me Tour	July 26, 2025	Andy Grammer	
Sheryl Crow	Sheryl Crow Tour	August 1, 1997	Wilco	
Slipknot	(sic)est Stadium Tour	July 28, 2027	Bring Me The Horizon; Lorna Shore	
—	Southern Ground Music Festival	August 30, 2014	—N/a	
—	Southern Ground Music Festival	August 31, 2014	—N/a	
Spin Doctors	1993 Tour	July 16, 1993	Soul Asylum & Screaming Trees	
Staind	Chapter V Tour	July 20, 2005	3 Doors Down, Breaking Benjamin & No Address	
Staind	The Illusion of Progress Tour	July 26, 2008	3 Doors Down, Hinder & Jet Black Stare	
Staind	The Illusion of Progress Tour	July 27, 2008	3 Doors Down, Hinder & Jet Black Stare	
Stevie Nicks	2024 Live in Concert Tour	September 28, 2024	-	
Sting	Brand New Day Tour	September 10, 2000	Jonny Lang	
Sting	Sacred Love Tour	July 28, 2004	Dominic Miller & Annie Lennox	
Styx	Return to Paradise Tour	June 21, 1996	Kansas	
—	Summer MixTape Festival	August 17, 2012	—N/a	
—	Summer MixTape Festival	August 18, 2012	—N/a	
—	Summer MixTape Festival	July 26, 2013	—N/a	
—	Summer MixTape Festival	July 27, 2013	—N/a	
Thomas Rhett	Very Hot Summer Tour	July 20, 2019	Dustin Lynch, Russell Dickerson, & Rhett Akins	
Three Days Grace & Breaking Benjamin	One-X Tour	September 22, 2007	Live, Collective Soul & Seether	
Tina Turner	Private Dancer Tour	August 10, 1985	Glenn Frey	
Train	Play That Song Tour	June 17, 2017	O.A.R. & Natasha Bedingfield	
Twenty One Pilots	Emotional Roadshow World Tour	June 19, 2016	Mutemath & Chef'Special	
Twenty One Pilots	The Clancy World Tour	September 27, 2025	Dayglow	
Toby Keith	Shock'n Y'all Tour	September 5, 2003	Blake Shelton	
Toby Keith	Big Throwdown Tour	September 3, 2004	Terri Clark & Scotty Emerick	
Toby Keith	Big Throwdown II Tour	August 26, 2005	Lee Ann Womack & Shooter Jennings	
Toby Keith	White Trash with Money Tour	August 27, 2006	Joe Nichols & Rushlow Harris	
Tom Petty and the Heartbreakers	Echo Tour	July 5, 1999	Lucinda Williams	
Tom Petty and the Heartbreakers	The Last DJ Tour	July 14, 2002	The Brian Setzer Orchestra	
U2	Zoo TV Tour	August 7, 1992	—N/a	
Usher	8701 Evolution Tour	June 28, 2002	Nas, Faith Evans & Mr. Cheeks	
Van Halen	2004 North American Tour	June 13, 2004	Silvertide	
Whitney Houston	Moment of Truth World Tour	August 13, 1987	Kenny G	
The Who	2002 North American Tour	July 29, 2002	Robert Plant	
ZZ Top	Recycler World Tour	February 7, 1991	The Black Crowes	
Zac Brown Band	Jekyll + Hyde Tour	September 5, 2015	Gregg Allman	
Zac Brown Band	Welcome Home Tour	September 3, 2017	Darrell Scott	
Zac Brown Band	Down the Rabbit Hole Live	June 22, 2018	Darrell Scott	
Zac Brown Band	The Owl Tour	August 29, 2019	Lukas Nelson & Promise of the Real	
Zac Brown Band	The Comeback Tour	August 21, 2021	Ashland Craft & Teddy Swims	
5 Seconds of Summer	Rock Out with Your Socks Out Tour	August 29, 2015	Hey Violet	
5 Seconds of Summer	Sounds Live Feels Live World Tour	July 2, 2016	Hey Violet & One Ok Rock	

^{1} Concert rescheduled due to thunderstorm evacuation.

== See also ==
- Big 33 Football Classic
- Hershey High School
- Star Pavilion
