= 2000 CONCACAF Pre-Olympic Tournament =

North American football tournament

Tournament details
- Host country: United States
- Dates: 21–30 April
- Teams: 6 (from 1 confederation)
- Venue: 1 (in 1 host city)

Final positions
- Champions: Honduras (1st title)
- Runners-up: United States
- Third place: Mexico
- Fourth place: Guatemala

Tournament statistics
- Matches played: 15
- Goals scored: 24 (1.6 per match)
- Top scorer(s): (Guatemala) Carlos Ruiz (Honduras) David Suazo (Mexico) Joaquín Beltrán (United States) Chris Albright (United States) Josh Wolff (2 goals each)

The 2000 CONCACAF Men's Pre-Olympic Tournament was the tenth edition of the CONCACAF Pre-Olympic Tournament, the quadrennial, international, age-restricted football tournament organized by CONCACAF to determine which men's under-23 national teams from the North, Central America and Caribbean region qualify for the Olympic football tournament. It was held in the United States, from 21 and 30 April 2000.

Honduras won the tournament with a 2–1 final win over the United States. As the top two teams, Honduras and the United States qualified for the 2000 Summer Olympics in Australia as CONCACAF representatives.

== Qualification ==
All 41 CONCACAF nations entered the competition, and with the hosts United States qualifying automatically, the other 40 teams competed in the qualifying competition to determine the remaining five spots in the final tournament.

- First round: A total of 12 teams played home-and-away over two legs in six ties. The six winners advanced to the second round.
- Second round: A total of 14 teams played home-and-away over two legs in seven ties. The seven winners advanced to the third round.
- Third round: A total of 11 teams were divided into two groups of four (Group A and B) and one group of three (Group C). In each group, teams played against each other once in a single round-robin format, for a total of three matches per team in Group A and B; two for Group C. The top two teams in Group A and B; and winner of Group C of each of the six groups advance to the final round.

=== Qualified teams ===
The following teams qualified for the final tournament.

Zone	Country	Method of qualification	Appearance^{1}	Last appearance	Previous best performance	Previous Olympic appearances (last)
North America	United States (hosts)	Automatic	6th	1992		
North America	Canada	Third round – Group A winners	4th	1996	Runners-up (1984, 1996)	
North America	Mexico (title holders)	Third round – Group B winners	7th	1996	Winners (1964, 1972, 1976, 1988, 1996)	
Central America	Guatemala	Third round – Group A runners-up	5th	1988	Winners (1968)	
Central America	Honduras	Third round – Group B runners-up	2nd	1992		
Central America	Panama	Third round – Group C winners	2nd	1964	Fourth place (1964)	

^{1} Only final tournament.

== Venue ==
The matches were played in Hershey.

Hershey
Hersheypark Stadium
Capacity: 16,000

== Squads ==
Each team has to submit a list of 18-man (two players have to be goalkeepers).

== Final round ==
=== Group D ===
Pos	Team	Pld	W	D	L	GF	GA	GD	Pts	Qualification
1	United States (H)	2	1	1	0	3	0	+3	4	Advance to knockout stage
2	Honduras	2	1	0	1	2	3	−1	3	Advance to knockout stage
3	Canada	2	0	1	1	0	2	−2	1	

Source: CONCACAF
(H) Hosts
21 April 2000

United States	3–0	Honduras
Albright 37', 77'; Thorrington 85'	Report

Hersheypark Stadium, Hershey
Attendance: 11,229
Referee: Peter Prendergast (Jamaica)

23 April 2000

Canada	0–2	Honduras
	Report	Phillips 33'; Ramírez 90'

Hersheypark Stadium, Hershey
Attendance: 8,580
Referee: William Mattus (Costa Rica)

25 April 2000

United States	0–0	Canada
	Report

Hersheypark Stadium, Hershey
Attendance: 5,798
Referee: Neftali Recinos (El Salvador)

=== Group E ===
Pos	Team	Pld	W	D	L	GF	GA	GD	Pts	Qualification
1	Mexico	2	1	1	0	4	1	+3	4	Advance to knockout stage
2	Guatemala	2	1	1	0	3	2	+1	4	Advance to knockout stage
3	Panama	2	0	0	2	1	5	−4	0	

Source: CONCACAF
21 April 2000

Panama	1–2	Guatemala
Ortega 68'	Report	Ruiz 27', 81'

Hersheypark Stadium, Hershey
Attendance: 11,241
Referee: Neftalí Recinos (El Salvador)

23 April 2000

Mexico	1–1	Guatemala
Beltrán 43'	Report	García 80'

Hersheypark Stadium, Hershey
Attendance: 8,580
Referee: Ramesh Ramdhan (Trinidad and Tobago)

25 April 2000

Mexico	3–0	Panama

Hersheypark Stadium, Hershey

== Knockout stage ==
=== Bracket ===
Semi-finals
28 April – Hershey
United States	4
Guatemala	0
28 April – Hershey
Honduras (p)	0 (5)
Mexico	0 (4)

Final
30 April – Hershey
United States	1
Honduras	2
Third place play-off
30 April – Hershey
Guatemala	0
Mexico	5

=== Semi-finals ===
The semi-final winners qualified for the 2000 Summer Olympics.

28 April 2000
20:25 EDT

United States	4–0	Guatemala
O'Brien 1'; Wolff 8'; Donovan 22', 90+1'	Report

Hersheypark Stadium, Hershey
Attendance: 12,299
Referee: Ramesh Ramdhan (Trinidad and Tobago)

28 April 2000

Honduras	0–0 (a.e.t.)	Mexico
	Report
Penalties
D. Suazo (penalty scored); Pavón (penalty scored); M. Suazo (penalty scored); Izaguirre (penalty scored); Gutiérrez (penalty scored)	5–4	Rodríguez (penalty missed); Márquez (penalty scored); Pérez (penalty scored); Collazo (penalty scored); Altamirano (penalty scored)

Hersheypark Stadium, Hershey

=== Third place play-off ===
30 April 2000

Mexico	5–0	Guatemala

Hersheypark Stadium, Hershey

=== Final ===
30 April 2000

United States	1–2	Honduras
Wolff 12'	Report	Suazo 29', 56'

Hersheypark Stadium, Hershey
Attendance: 12,126
Referee: Peter Prendergast (Jamaica)

== Final ranking ==
As per statistical convention in football, matches decided in extra time are counted as wins and losses, while matches decided by penalty shoot-outs are counted as draws.

Pos	Team	Pld	W	D	L	GF	GA	GD	Pts	Final result
1st place, gold medalist(s)	Honduras	4	2	1	1	4	4	0	7	Winners
2nd place, silver medalist(s)	United States (H)	4	2	1	1	8	1	+7	7	Runner-ups
3rd place, bronze medalist(s)	Mexico	4	2	2	0	9	1	+8	8	Third place
4	Guatemala	4	1	1	2	3	11	−8	4	Fourth place
5	Canada	2	0	1	1	0	2	−2	1	Eliminated in group stage
6	Panama	2	0	0	2	1	5	−4	0	Eliminated in group stage

(H) Hosts

== Qualified teams for Summer Olympics ==
The following two teams from CONCACAF qualified for the 2000 Summer Olympics.

Team	Qualified on	Previous appearances in Summer Olympics^{1}
United States	28 April 2000	12 (1904, 1924, 1928, 1936, 1948, 1952, 1956, 1972, 1984, 1988, 1992, 1996)
Honduras	28 April 2000	0 (debut)

^{1} Bold indicates champions for that year. Italic indicates hosts for that year.
