= António Fonseca =

Portuguese football manager and former player

Personal information
- Full name: António Manuel Tavares Fonseca
- Date of birth: 30 January 1965 (age 61)
- Place of birth: Lisbon, Portugal
- Height: 1.72 m (5 ft 8 in)
- Position: Left back

Youth career
- 1978–1979: Olivais
- 1979–1980: Sporting CP
- 1980–1981: Oriental
- 1981–1982: Torralta
- 1982–1983: Benfica

Senior career*
Years	Team	Apps	(Gls)
1983–1984	Cova Piedade	15	(0)
1984–1985	Alcobaça	24	(0)
1985–1987	Tirsense	54	(1)
1987–1990	Benfica	39	(1)
1990–1992	Vitória Guimarães	32	(0)
1992–1999	Estrela Amadora	160	(2)
1999–2001	Vancouver Whitecaps	15	(0)
Total		339	(4)

International career
1989–1990	Portugal	4	(0)

Managerial career
- 2002–2004: Vancouver Whitecaps
- 2007–2012: Canada (assistant)
- 2009–2012: Canada U23
- 2013: Canada (interim)
- * Club domestic league appearances and goals

António Manuel Tavares "Tony" Fonseca (born 30 January 1965) is a Portuguese former footballer who played as a left back, and a technical director for the Canadian Soccer Association.

Over 11 seasons, he amassed Primeira Liga totals of 199 games and two goals, representing in the competition Benfica, Vitória de Guimarães and Estrela da Amadora. He finished his career in Canada, where he started working as a manager in 1999.

== Club career ==
Born in Lisbon, Fonseca played youth football for five clubs, finishing his grooming at local Benfica. From 1983 to 1987 he competed in the Segunda Liga, after which the former bought him from Tirsense.

During his three-year tenure with Benfica, Fonseca was first-choice in the 1988–89 campaign as the team won the Primeira Liga championship and also reached the final of the Taça de Portugal, but played second-fiddle to Álvaro Magalhães and Samuel Quina in the other two. In eight of the following nine seasons he continued to play in the top flight, with Vitória de Guimarães and Estrela da Amadora, appearing regularly for both sides and reuniting at the latter with former Benfica teammates Edmundo, José Carlos, Fernando Mendes and Paulinho.

Fonseca retired from football in 2000 at the age of 35, after two years with the Vancouver Whitecaps in the USL A-League, with whom he later worked as a manager.

== International career ==
Fonseca earned four caps for Portugal, over one year. He made his debut on 29 March 1989, playing the entirety of a 6–0 friendly win over Angola with marked the 75th anniversary of the Portuguese Football Federation.

During five years, Fonseca served as assistant to Stephen Hart and Dale Mitchell at the Canada national team, while also being in charge of the under-23s. Already as a technical director for the Canadian Soccer Association, he acted as interim for the full side following the departure of Colin Miller, who later replaced him after two friendlies.

== Personal life ==
Fonseca married a Portuguese-Canadian woman, fathering two children.
