= 2000 CONCACAF Men's Pre-Olympic Tournament squads =

The 2000 CONCACAF Men's Pre-Olympic Tournament was an international football tournament that was held in the United States from 21 to 30 April 2000. The six national teams involved in the tournament were required to register a squad of eighteen players.

The age listed for each player is on 21 April 2000, the first day of the tournament. A flag is included for coaches who are of a different nationality than their own national team. Players marked in bold have been capped at full international level.

== Group D ==
=== Canada ===
Coach: (Canada) Bruce Twamley

No.	Pos.	Player	Date of birth (age)	Caps	Club
	GK	Lars Hirschfeld			
	GK	Mike Franks			
	DF	Kevan Cameron			
	DF	Jeff Clarke			
	DF	Steve McCauley			
	DF	Kevin McKenna			
	DF	Marco Reda			
	DF	Jeff Skinner			
	MF	Robbie Aristodemo			
	MF	Jason Bent			
	MF	Patrice Bernier			
	MF	Richard Hastings			
	MF	Steve Kindel			
	MF	Jason Mathot			
	FW	Dwayne de Rosario			
	FW	Paul Stalteri			
	FW	Alfredo Valente			

=== Honduras ===
Coach: Ramón Maradiaga

The 18-man final squad.

No.	Pos.	Player	Date of birth (age)	Club
	GK	Belarmino Rivera	5 February 1956 (aged 44)	(National Autonomous Federation of Football of Honduras) Olimpia
	GK	Noel Valladares	3 May 1977 (aged 22)	(National Autonomous Federation of Football of Honduras) Motagua
	DF	Iván Guerrero	30 November 1977 (aged 22)	(National Autonomous Federation of Football of Honduras) Motagua
	FW	Héctor Gutiérrez		(National Autonomous Federation of Football of Honduras) Real España
	DF	Júnior Izaguirre	12 August 1979 (aged 20)	(National Autonomous Federation of Football of Honduras) Motagua
	DF	Walter López	1 September 1977 (aged 22)	(National Autonomous Federation of Football of Honduras) Platense
	DF	Elmer Montoya	8 December 1977 (aged 22)	(National Autonomous Federation of Football of Honduras) Motagua
	DF	Jaime Rosales	8 June 1978 (aged 21)	(National Autonomous Federation of Football of Honduras) Marathón
	DF	Julio Suazo	5 October 1978 (aged 21)	(National Autonomous Federation of Football of Honduras) Victoria
	DF	Danilo Turcios	8 May 1978 (aged 21)	(National Autonomous Federation of Football of Honduras) Universidad
	MF	Mario Chirinos	29 July 1978 (aged 21)	(National Autonomous Federation of Football of Honduras) Motagua
	MF	Carlos Oliva	28 July 1979 (aged 20)	(National Autonomous Federation of Football of Honduras) Real España
	MF	Francisco Pavón	28 January 1977 (aged 23)	(National Autonomous Federation of Football of Honduras) Victoria
	MF	Maynor Suazo	10 August 1979 (aged 20)	(National Autonomous Federation of Football of Honduras) Marathón
	FW	Orvin Cabrera	20 February 1977 (aged 23)	(National Autonomous Federation of Football of Honduras) Olimpia
	FW	Hesler Phillips	18 November 1978 (aged 21)	(National Autonomous Federation of Football of Honduras) Universidad
	FW	Luis Ramírez	21 November 1977 (aged 22)	(National Autonomous Federation of Football of Honduras) Real España
	FW	David Suazo	5 November 1979 (aged 20)	(Italian Football Federation) Cagliari

(N°7)Hector Gutierrez FW 08/02/1980 Real España (Honduras)

=== United States ===
Coach: (England) Clive Charles

The 18-man final squad was announced on 7 April 2000.

No.	Pos.	Player	Date of birth (age)	Club
1	GK	Adin Brown	27 May 1978 (aged 21)	(United States Soccer Federation) Colorado Rapids
18	GK	Tim Howard	6 March 1979 (aged 21)	(United States Soccer Federation) MetroStars
4	DF	Danny Califf	17 March 1980 (aged 20)	(United States Soccer Federation) LA Galaxy
6	DF	Steve Cherundolo	19 February 1979 (aged 21)	(German Football Association) Hannover 96
12	DF	Ramiro Corrales	29 March 1977 (aged 23)	(United States Soccer Federation) MetroStars
2	DF	Brian Dunseth	2 March 1977 (aged 23)	(United States Soccer Federation) New England Revolution
3	DF	Chad McCarty	5 October 1977 (aged 22)	(United States Soccer Federation) Tampa Bay Mutiny
9	MF	DaMarcus Beasley	24 May 1982 (aged 17)	(United States Soccer Federation) Chicago Fire
5	MF	John O'Brien	29 August 1977 (aged 22)	(Royal Dutch Football Association) AFC Ajax
14	MF	Ben Olsen	3 May 1977 (aged 22)	(United States Soccer Federation) D.C. United
8	MF	John Thorrington	17 October 1979 (aged 20)	(German Football Association) Bayer Leverkusen
10	MF	Peter Vagenas	6 February 1978 (aged 22)	(United States Soccer Federation) LA Galaxy
11	FW	Chris Albright	14 January 1979 (aged 21)	(United States Soccer Federation) D.C. United
17	FW	Conor Casey	25 July 1981 (aged 18)	(United States Soccer Federation) University of Portland
13	FW	Landon Donovan	4 March 1982 (aged 18)	(German Football Association) Bayer Leverkusen
16	FW	**Josh Wolff**	25 February 1977 (aged 23)	(United States Soccer Federation) Chicago Fire

== Group E ==
=== Mexico ===
Coach: (Mexico) Gustavo Vargas

No.	Pos.	Player	Date of birth (age)	Club
1	GK	Christian Martínez	16 October 1979 (aged 20)	(Mexican Football Federation) América
12	GK	Adrián Zermeño	1 May 1979 (aged 20)	(Mexican Football Federation) Cruz Azul Hidalgo
2	DF	Edgar Solano	26 October 1978 (aged 21)	(Mexican Football Federation) Necaxa
3	DF	Joaquín Beltrán	29 April 1977 (aged 22)	(Mexican Football Federation) UNAM
4	DF	Rafael Márquez	13 February 1979 (aged 21)	(French Football Federation) Monaco
6	DF	Ignacio Hierro	22 June 1978 (aged 21)	(Mexican Football Federation) Guadalajara
7	DF	Luis Ernesto Pérez	12 January 1981 (aged 19)	(Mexican Football Federation) Necaxa
5	MF	Gerardo Torrado	30 April 1979 (aged 20)	(Mexican Football Federation) UNAM
10	MF	Juan Pablo Rodríguez	8 July 1979 (aged 20)	(Mexican Football Federation) Atlas
18	MF	Cesáreo Victorino	19 March 1979 (aged 21)	(Mexican Football Federation) Pachuca
14	MF	Héctor Altamirano	17 March 1977 (aged 23)	(Mexican Football Federation) Santos Laguna
9	FW	Alejandro Nava		
11	FW	Daniel Osorno	16 April 1979 (aged 21)	(Mexican Football Federation) Atlas
15	FW	Emilio Mora	7 March 1978 (aged 22)	(Mexican Football Federation) Morelia

(N°9)Jose Alejandro Nava Veladez FW 20/09/1979 Club Deportivo Guadalajara S.A. de C.V.(Mexico)
