= 1996 CONCACAF Men's Pre-Olympic Tournament squads =

Football competition roster

Below are the rosters for the 1996 CONCACAF Men's Pre-Olympic Tournament.

== Canada ==
Coach: (Canada) Bob Lenarduzzi

No.	Pos.	Player	Date of birth (age)	Caps	Club
12	GK	Garrett Caldwell			
1	GK	Jim Larkin			
18	GK	Paul Shepherd			
2	DF	Nico Berg			
4	DF	Jason de Vos			
3	DF	Richard Hikida			
6	DF	Nevio Pizzolitto			
19	DF	Richard Sumner			
5	MF	Giuliano Oliviero			
8	MF	Garret Kusch			
20	MF	Martin Nash			
15	MF	Chris Franks			
13	MF	Scott Macey			
11	FW	Davide Xausa			
17	FW	Niall Thompson			
14	FW	Carmen D'Onofrio			
9	FW	Troy Wood			
10	FW	Tony Capasso			
21	FW	Oliver Heald			
7	FW	Linus Rhode			
