= Alexis Renderos =

Salvadoran footballer (born 1998)

Personal information
- Full name: Alexis Mauricio Montes Renderos
- Date of birth: 1 June 1998 (age 28)
- Place of birth: La Paz, El Salvador
- Height: 1.77 m (5 ft 10 in)
- Position: Left-back

Team information
- Current team: Alianza
- Number: 17

Senior career*
Years	Team	Apps	(Gls)
2017–2019	Alianza	5	(0)
2019–2021	Sonsonate	55	(9)
2021–	Alianza	72	(5)

International career^{‡}
2018	El Salvador U21	3	(0)
2019–2020	El Salvador U23	4	(0)
2021–2022	El Salvador	4	(0)
- * Club domestic league appearances and goals as of 21:27, 20 May 2023 (UTC) ‡ National team caps and goals as of 8 February 2025 (UTC)

Alexis Mauricio Montes Renderos (born 1 June 1998) is a Salvadoran professional footballer who plays as a left-back for Primera División club Alianza and the El Salvador national team.

== Career ==
Renderos began his senior career with Alianza, before moving to Sonsonate in 2019. After a couple seasons as the starter for Sonsonate, he returned to Alianza for the 2021–22 season on 3 June 2021.

== International career ==
Renderos debuted with the El Salvador national team in a 0–0 friendly tie with Guatemala on 27 June 2021. He was called up to represent El Salvador at the 2021 CONCACAF Gold Cup.
