= Canada men's national under-23 soccer team =

Canada U-23
- Nicknames: The Canucks; Les Rouges (The Reds)
- Association: Canadian Soccer Association
- Confederation: CONCACAF (North America)
- Head coach: Mauro Biello
- Top scorer: Rob Friend (12)
- FIFA code: CAN
First colours	Second colours

First international
- Unofficial; San Marino 0–1 Canada (Serravalle, San Marino; 28 March 1986); Official; Canada 3–0 Trinidad and Tobago (Burnaby, Canada; 5 May 1991)

Biggest win
- Canada 14–0 U.S. Virgin Islands (Saint John, Canada; 10 September 2003)

Biggest defeat
- Australia 5–0 Canada (Sydney, Australia; 2 June 1996)

Pan American Games
- Appearances: 2 (first in 1999)
- Best result: Fourth place (1999)

The Canada U-23 men's national soccer team (also known as Canada Olympic soccer team) represents Canada in international soccer at this age level. They are overseen by the Canadian Soccer Association, the governing body for soccer in Canada.

Unlike UEFA member associations that use U-21 regional competitions as Olympic qualifying, as a member of CONCACAF, Canada's U-23 team competes in regional qualifying in the same year as the Summer Olympics, and its call-ups are traditionally only limited to players under 23 years of age.

== History ==
=== 2008 qualifying ===
Known for his vocal antics on the touchline, Nick Dasovic led Canada through Olympic qualifying in 2008, drawing Mexico 1–1 and helping to eliminate the heavily favoured Mexican side in the process. After a highly promising 5–0 win over Guatemala on a night when Mexico had to better that result against Haiti but could only win 5–1, Canada fell to the United States 3–0 in the semifinal, losing out on a spot in Beijing at the Olympics that summer. Canada recovered to defeat Guatemala in the third-place playoff, a rematch of their first-round game, winning on penalties (5–3) after a scoreless draw through 120 minutes.

=== 2012 qualifying ===
Tony Fonseca led Canada to an opening game 0–0 draw against El Salvador. Following this, Canada stunned the United States 2–0, contributing to their surprising early elimination on home soil. Canada disappointed in their final group stage game with a 1–1 tie versus Cuba, setting up a more difficult semi-final for them against Mexico, which they would lose 3–1.

=== 2016 qualifying ===
It was announced in August 2015 that Canada head coach Benito Floro would be in charge of the Olympic team. The final squad for qualification was announced on September 18, 2015.

=== Coaching history ===
- (Portugal) Tony Fonseca (2009–2012)
- (Spain) Benito Floro (2013–2015)
- (England) John Herdman (2018)
- (Canada) Mauro Biello (2022)

== Players ==
=== Current squad ===
Players in bold have been capped with the senior team.
‡ – designated overage player.

The following 20 players were named to the squad for the 2020 CONCACAF Men's Olympic Qualifying Championship. Caps and goals as of March 28, 2021, after the game against Mexico.

No.	Pos.	Player	Date of birth (age)	Caps	Goals	Club
1	GK	James Pantemis ‡	February 21, 1997 (age 29)	7	0	(United States Soccer Federation) Portland Timbers
18	GK	Matthew Nogueira	March 18, 1998 (age 28)	0	0	(Canadian Soccer Association) Scrosoppi FC
19	GK	Sebastian Breza	March 15, 1998 (age 28)	0	0	(Canadian Soccer Association) CF Montréal
2	DF	**Zachary Brault-Guillard**	December 30, 1998 (age 27)	4	0	(Canadian Soccer Association) FC Supra
3	DF	**Zorhan Bassong**	May 7, 1999 (age 27)	3	0	(United States Soccer Federation) Sporting Kansas City
4	DF	Diyaeddine Abzi	November 23, 1998 (age 27)	1	0	(Canadian Soccer Association) FC Supra
5	DF	**Derek Cornelius**	November 25, 1997 (age 28)	7	1	(French Football Federation) Marseille
13	DF	**Marcus Godinho**	June 28, 1997 (age 29)	4	0	(Canadian Soccer Association) HFX Wanderers
16	DF	Callum Montgomery	May 14, 1997 (age 29)	2	0	(United States Soccer Federation) Detroit City FC
6	MF	Michael Baldisimo^{NE}	April 13, 2000 (age 26)	5	0	(Canadian Soccer Association) Cavalry FC
8	MF	David Norman Jr.	May 31, 1998 (age 28)	9	0	(Canadian Soccer Association) Vancouver FC
10	MF	Aidan Daniels	September 6, 1998 (age 28)	8	0	(Canadian Soccer Association) Pacific FC
14	MF	Ryan Raposo	March 5, 1999 (age 27)	4	0	(United States Soccer Federation) Los Angeles FC
17	MF	Patrick Metcalfe	November 11, 1998 (age 28)	4	0	(Norwegian Football Federation) HamKam
20	MF	Lucas Dias	January 18, 2003 (age 23)	4	0	(Portuguese Football Federation) Sporting B
7	FW	**Tajon Buchanan**	February 8, 1999 (age 27)	4	2	(Royal Spanish Football Federation) Villarreal
9	FW	**Charles-Andreas Brym**	August 8, 1998 (age 28)	4	0	(Royal Dutch Football Association) NAC Breda
11	FW	**Ballou Tabla**	March 31, 1999 (age 27)	4	0	(Canadian Soccer Association) Atlético Ottawa
12	FW	Mohamed Farsi^{NE}	December 16, 1999 (age 26)	2	0	(United States Soccer Federation) Columbus Crew
15	FW	**Theo Bair**	August 27, 1999 (age 27)	8	1	(The Football Association) Bolton Wanderers
INJ = Withdrew due to injury; NE = No longer eligible. Switched allegiance to another nation.; PRE = Preliminary squad; RET = Retired from the national team; WD = Withdrew for non-injury reason

=== Recent call-ups ===
The following players have been called up within the last 12 months and are still eligible at U23 level.

Pos.	Player	Date of birth (age)	Caps	Goals	Club	Latest call-up

=== Previous squads ===
CONCACAF Men's Olympic Qualifying Championship

- 1996 CONCACAF Men's Olympic Qualifying Championship squad
- 2000 CONCACAF Men's Olympic Qualifying Championship squad
- 2004 CONCACAF Men's Olympic Qualifying Championship squad
- 2008 CONCACAF Men's Olympic Qualifying Championship squad
- 2012 CONCACAF Men's Olympic Qualifying Championship squad
- 2015 CONCACAF Men's Olympic Qualifying Championship squad
- 2020 CONCACAF Men's Olympic Qualifying Championship squad

Pan American Games

- 2015 Pan American Games squad

== Competitive record ==
=== Summer Olympics ===
Summer Olympics record									Summer Olympics Qualification record					
Year	Result	Position	Pld	W	D	L	GF	GA	Pld	W	D	L	GF	GA
(Spain) 1992	did not qualify								10	4	2	4	18	16
(United States) 1996	did not qualify								7	2	3	2	9	10
(Australia) 2000	did not qualify								5	2	2	1	3	2
(Greece) 2004	did not qualify								3	0	0	3	1	5
(China) 2008	did not qualify								5	1	2	2	7	6
(United Kingdom) 2012	did not qualify								4	1	2	1	4	4
(Brazil) 2016	did not qualify								5	1	1	3	6	10
(Japan) 2020	did not qualify								4	1	2	1	3	3
(France) 2024	did not qualify								Played by U–20 team					
Total	–	0/9	–	–	–	–	–	–	43	12	14	17	51	56

=== Pan American Games ===
Pan American Games record
Year	Result	Position	Pld	W	D	L	GF	GA
(Argentina) 1995	did not participate							
(Canada) 1999	Fourth place	4th of 10	6	2	2	2	6	6
(Dominican Republic) 2003	did not participate							
(Brazil) 2007	did not participate							
(Mexico) 2011	did not participate							
(Canada) 2015	Group stage	7th of 8	3	0	1	2	1	6
(Peru) 2019	did not participate							
Total	Fourth place	2/7	9	2	3	4	7	12

== Honours ==
- CONCACAF Olympic Qualifying Tournament
  - Runners-up: 1996

== See also ==
- Canada men's national soccer team
- Canada men's national under-20 soccer team
- Canada men's national under-17 soccer team
- Canada men's national under-15 soccer team
- Canada men's national futsal team
- Soccer in Canada
