= Ronald Rodríguez =

Salvadoran footballer (born 1998)

Personal information
- Full name: Ronald Daniel Gómez Rodríguez
- Date of birth: 22 September 1998 (age 28)
- Place of birth: San Miguel, El Salvador
- Height: 1.85 m (6 ft 1 in)
- Position: Centre-back

Team information
- Current team: Águila
- Number: 28

Senior career*
Years	Team	Apps	(Gls)
2017–2022	Águila	126	(8)
2022	FC Tulsa	20	(0)
2022-	Águila	118	(13)

International career^{‡}
2017	El Salvador U-20	1	(0)
2021	El Salvador U-23	2	(0)
2021–	El Salvador	34	(0)
- * Club domestic league appearances and goals as of 12 December 2025 ‡ National team caps and goals as of 19 November 2025

Ronald Daniel Gómez Rodríguez (born 22 September 1998) is a Salvadoran professional footballer who plays as a center-back for Primera División club Águila and the El Salvador national team.

== Club career ==
On January 19 2022, Rodriguez joined USL Championship club FC Tulsa. He was released by Tulsa following the 2022 season.

== International career ==
He made his debut for El Salvador national football team on 5 June 2021 in a World Cup qualifier against U.S. Virgin Islands.
