= Marcelo Díaz (Salvadoran footballer) =

Salvadoran footballer (born 2000)

Personal information
- Full name: Herberth Marcelo Díaz Rivas
- Date of birth: 19 April 2000 (age 26)
- Height: 1.74 m (5 ft 9 in)
- Position: Midfielder

Team information
- Current team: Águila

Youth career
- Alianza

Senior career*
Years	Team	Apps	(Gls)
2018–2020	Alianza	1	(0)
2020–2023	Once Deportivo	97	(10)
2023–	Águila	104	(4)

International career^{‡}
2021	El Salvador U23	3	(0)
2021–	El Salvador	11	(0)
- * Club domestic league appearances and goals as of 18 May 2023 ‡ National team caps and goals as of 14 October 2021

Herberth Marcelo Díaz Rivas, known as Marcelo Díaz (born 19 April 2000) is a Salvadoran professional footballer who plays as a midfielder for Primera División club Águila.

== International career ==
He made his debut for the El Salvador national football team on 7 October 2021 in a World Cup qualifier against Panama.
