= 1992 CONCACAF Pre-Olympic Tournament =

North American football tournament

Tournament details
- Dates: 25 March – 17 May
- Teams: 4 (from 1 confederation)

Final positions
- Champions: United States (1st title)
- Runners-up: Mexico
- Third place: Canada
- Fourth place: Honduras

Tournament statistics
- Matches played: 12
- Goals scored: 49 (4.08 per match)
- Top scorer: (United States) Steve Snow (8 goals)
- All statistics correct as of complete.

The 1992 CONCACAF Pre-Olympic Tournament was the eighth edition of the CONCACAF Pre-Olympic Tournament, the quadrennial, international, age-restricted football tournament organised by CONCACAF to determine which men's under-23 national teams from the North, Central America and Caribbean region qualify for the Olympic football tournament.

The winners, United States, qualified for the 1992 Summer Olympics together with runners-up Mexico as CONCACAF representatives.

== Qualification ==
=== Qualified teams ===
The following teams qualified for the final tournament.

Zone	Country	Method of qualification	Appearance^{1}	Last appearance	Previous best performance	Previous Olympic appearances (last)
North America	Canada	Intermediary round winners	2nd	1984	Runners-up (1984)	
North America	Mexico	Intermediary round best second-placed	5th	1988	Winners (1964, 1972, 1976)	
North America	United States	Intermediary round winners	5th	1988	Third place (1972, 1980)	
Central America	Honduras	Intermediary round winners	1st	0 (debut)	Debutant	

^{1} Only final tournament.

== Final round ==
Pos	Team	Pld	W	D	L	GF	GA	GD	Pts	Qualification
1	United States (C)	6	5	0	1	17	10	+7	15	Qualification to 1992 Summer Olympics
2	Mexico	6	3	1	2	14	9	+5	10	Qualification to 1992 Summer Olympics
3	Canada	6	1	2	3	7	12	−5	5	
4	Honduras	6	1	1	4	11	18	−7	4	

Source: RSSSF
(C) Champions
25 March 1992

Mexico	1–2	United States

Estadio Ciudad de los Deportes, México City
5 April 1992

Canada	1–1	Mexico

Swangard Stadium, Burnaby, British Columbia
5 April 1992

United States	4–3	Honduras

West Community Stadium, Fenton
12 April 1992

Canada	2–2	Honduras

Estadio Francisco Morazán, San Pedro Sula
19 April 1992

Honduras	3–4	United States

21 April 1992

Mexico	4–1	Canada

Estadio Ciudad de los Deportes, México City
26 April 1992

Honduras	1–0	Canada

Estadio Francisco Morazán, San Pedro Sula
26 April 1992

United States	3–0	Mexico

Murray H. Goodman Stadium, Bethlehem, Pennsylvania
6 May 1992

Honduras	1–3	Mexico

Estadio Nacional Chelato Uclés, Tegucigalpa
10 May 1992

United States	3–1	Canada

Bill Armstrong Stadium, Bloomington, Indiana
17 May 1992

Canada	2–1	United States

Canada Games Stadium, Saint John, New Brunswick
17 May 1992

Mexico	5–1	Honduras

Estadio Ciudad de los Deportes, México City

== Qualified teams for Summer Olympics ==
The following two teams from CONCACAF qualified for the 1992 Summer Olympics.

Team	Qualified on	Previous appearances in Summer Olympics^{1}
United States	May 1992	10 (1904, 1924, 1928, 1936, 1948, 1952, 1956, 1972, 1984, 1988)
Mexico	May 1992	6 (1928, 1948, 1964, 1968, 1972, 1976)

^{1} Bold indicates champions for that year. Italic indicates hosts for that year.
