= Melvin Cartagena =

Salvadoran footballer (born 1999)

Personal information
- Full name: Melvin Alberto Cartagena Portillo
- Date of birth: 30 July 1999 (age 27)
- Place of birth: Santa Ana, El Salvador
- Height: 1.74 m (5 ft 9 in)
- Position: Midfielder

Team information
- Current team: Águila
- Number: 7

Senior career*
Years	Team	Apps	(Gls)
2019–2020	C.D. FAS	5	(0)
2020–2023	Once Deportivo	36	(0)
2023-	Águila	60	(1)
Total		101	(1)

International career^{‡}
2021	El Salvador U23	3	(0)
2021–	El Salvador	24	(0)
- * Club domestic league appearances and goals as of 09:26, 12 June 2025 (UTC) ‡ National team caps and goals as of 09:26, 30 July 2026 (UTC)

Melvin Alberto Cartagena Portillo (born 30 July 1999) is a Salvadoran professional footballer who plays as a midfielder for Primera División club Águila and the El Salvador national team.

== International career ==
Cartagena made his debut with the El Salvador national team in a 4–0 2022 FIFA World Cup qualification win over St Kitts and Nevis on 12 June 2021.

== Career statistics ==
=== International ===
As of match played 21 June 2025

Appearances and goals by national team and year
National team	Year	Apps	Goals
El Salvador	2021	2	0
El Salvador	2022	–	
El Salvador	2023	5	0
El Salvador	2024	12	0
El Salvador	2025	5	0
Total		24	0
