= Damián Alguera =

Salvadoran footballer (born 2004)

Personal information
- Full name: Edgar Damián Alguera Mercado
- Date of birth: 11 February 2004 (age 22)
- Place of birth: San Jose, California, United States
- Height: 1.85 m (6 ft 1 in)
- Position: Goalkeeper

Youth career
- 2019: De Anza Force
- 2019–2020: Sporting Kansas City
- 2020–2021: San Jose Earthquakes
- 2021–2022: Philadelphia Union
- 2023: San Jose Earthquakes
- 2024–: Breakers FC

College career
Years	Team	Apps	(Gls)
2022	Cal State Bakersfield Roadrunners	4	(0)

Senior career*
Years	Team	Apps	(Gls)
2022	Philadelphia Union II	0	(0)

International career^{‡}
2019	United States U15	7	(0)
2022	El Salvador U20	4	(0)
2021–	El Salvador	1	(0)
- * Club domestic league appearances and goals as of 19:38, 13 November 2021 (UTC) ‡ National team caps and goals as of 05:14, 27 June 2022 (UTC)

Edgar Damián Alguera Mercado (born 11 February 2004) is a professional footballer who plays as a goalkeeper. Born in the United States, Alguera plays for the El Salvador national team.

== Career ==
Alguera is a youth product of De Anza Force, and the academies of Sporting Kansas City and San Jose Earthquakes. He signed with Philadelphia Union II in 2021.

In August 2024, Alguera began training with FC Martigues in France through a partnership between Martigues and Breakers FC.

== International career ==
Born in the United States, Alguera is of Salvadoran descent. He represented the United States U15 in 2019. He debuted with the El Salvador national team in a friendly 2–0 loss to Guatemala on 24 September 2021.
