= Rómulo Villalobos =

Salvadoran footballer (born 1997)

Romulo Villalobos
Personal information
- Full name: José Rómulo Villalobos Campos
- Date of birth: 4 March 1997 (age 29)
- Place of birth: San Miguel, El Salvador
- Height: 1.93 m (6 ft 4 in)
- Position: Defender

Team information
- Current team: Dragón
- Number: 4

Senior career*
Years	Team	Apps	(Gls)
2017–2019	Águila	11	(0)
2019–2021	Once Deportivo	26	(1)
2021–2022	Municipal Limeño	33	(2)
2022	Águila	1	(0)
2023–	Dragón	7	(0)

International career^{‡}
2017	El Salvador U20	2	(0)
2021	El Salvador U23	3	(0)
2021–	El Salvador	7	(1)
- * Club domestic league appearances and goals as of 21:27, 18 March 2023 (UTC) ‡ National team caps and goals as of 24 April 2022

José Rómulo Villalobos Campos (born 4 March 1997) is a Salvadoran professional footballer who plays as a defender for Primera División club Dragón and the El Salvador national team.

== International career ==
Villalobos debuted with the El Salvador national team in a 0–0 friendly draw against Guatemala on 27 June 2021. Villalobos was called up to represent El Salvador at the 2021 CONCACAF Gold Cup, but had to withdraw as he suffered a fractured hand.
