= Once Deportivo F.C. =

Association football club in El Salvador

Once Deportivo
- Full name: Once Deportivo Fútbol Club
- Nickname: Tanque Fronterizo
- Founded: 20 July 2019; 7 years ago
- Dissolved: 9 May 2025; 18 months ago
- Ground: Estadio Simeón Magaña
- Capacity: 5,000
- Owner: (El Salvador) Salume Inversión S.V
- Chairman: (El Salvador) Giancarlo Angelucci
- Manager: (El Salvador) Guillermo Rivera
- League: (El Salvador) Primera División
- 2025 Clausura: Overall: 11th Playoffs: Did not qualify
Home colours	Away colours

Once Deportivo Fútbol Club was a Salvadoran professional football club based in Ahuachapán, El Salvador. The club was founded on 20 July 2019, and plays its home games at Estadio Simeón Magaña.

== History ==
On July 20, 2019, Primera Division awarded a new license to ownership group who wanted a team based in Ahuachapan, This came about after Pasaquina were stripped of their license and were forced to sell their spot, the new team filled the vacancy in the market created by the dissolution of Once Municipal three years earlier. On July 21, 2019, the club announced that Once Deportivo, which had previously been used as a placeholder name for the club, would be the official team name.

Once Deportivo announced Uruguayan Pablo Quiñones as its head coach on July 20, 2017, joining general director Roberto Campos in a search for players. Segio Calero was signed as the club's first player on July 22, 2019.

Once Deportivo started its inaugural season against Municipal Limeno on 29 July 2019, losing 3–0. The club's first ever goal was a goal scored by Anthony Roque in the Once's third league game, a 2–1 loss against Aguila. Once Deportivo's first win was a 2–1 victory over Isidro Metapan, which came in the fifth round of their first Primera Division season on 18 August 2019. Once Deportivo finished their first season in twelfth position. They failed to make it into the top six teams to reach the finals.

Following the conclusion of the season, Once Deportivo sacked Pablo Quinones and hired Spaniard Juan Dieguez to be the new coach. The club bolstered their campaign with the hiring of international players such as Mexicans Marco Granados and Edgar Solis, Nicaraguan Luis Fernando Copete, and Salvaodran such as Marcelo Tejada. The club started the season strongly winning six games, drawing two games and losing three games. In March 2020 the season was suspended due to coronavirus pandemic. A week later FESFUT the organiser of El Salvador football declared that the final round of matches and the final would be cancelled due to the coronavirus pandemic. The title was subsequently awarded to Once Deportivo, who finished on top of the points table after the eleven rounds that were played. This is Once Deportivo first title in their history. However, at the FESFUT extraordinary meeting on 29 April 2020, it was decided that the Clausura 2020 season title originally awarded to Once Deportivo would be retracted and the title would not be awarded. However, they would remain the third representative of El Salvador in the 2021 CONCACAF League.

On the 13th of November, 2024 the club president Héctor Salazar announced on the club social media that the entire Once Deportivo board had resigned due to the club inability to continue to run the club, as the club had acquired 100,000 dollars' worth of debts.

Despite financial issues and most of the board resigning, Once Deportivo finished sixth in the Primera division, they went on to defeat LA Firpo and Cacahuatique and reached the final for the first time in their history. The club shocked the nation powerhouse team FAS 2–1 in the final, thanks to goals for Josue Rivera and Jomal Williams to win the title for the first time in history.

Following their title win, the club lost their coach Erick Prado and Josue Rivera to Isidro Metapan, Jorge Cruz to FAS and Goalkeeper Gerson Lopez to long term Injury. They Hired Argentinian Fabio Larramendi to defend their title, However they started the campaign as the worst season for a champion in Apertura/Clausura format, after 10 games the club had only gained 3 points (3 draws and 7 loss) and were anchored to the bottom of the table. After the poor start of the season Argentinian Fabio Larramendi was sacked.

On March 15, 2025 the president of Once Deportivo Giancarlo Angelucci announced that Once Deportivo will no longer be based or play in Ahuachapan due to conflict with the department council and refusal to install stadium lights ruling out night games.

== Honours ==
=== Domestic honours ===
==== Leagues ====
- Primera División Salvadorean and predecessors
  - Champions (1): Apertura 2024 None (2020 Clausura originally awarded but later retracted)

== Stadium ==
- Estadio Simeón Magaña, Ahuachapán (2019-Present)
  - Estadio Ana Mercedes Campos, Sonsonate (2019)

Once Deportivo plays its home games at Estadio Simeon Magana in Ahuachapan, Ahuachapan. However the club was not allowed to play at the Estadio Simeon Magana was to unable to meet the requirements to play for the first part of the Clausura 2019 therefore they moved their games to the Estadio Ana Mercedes Campos, Sonsonate. However they received approval to return to the Estadio Simeon Magana.

== Colours and crest ==
- Home

- Away

== Sponsorship ==
Companies that Once Deportivo currently has sponsorship deals with for 2024–2025 includes:

- Elite Wear SVs – Official kit suppliers
- Pepsi – Official sponsors
- Mister Donut – Official sponsors
- Canal 4 – Official sponsors
- La Geo – Official sponsors
- Sistema Fedecredito – Official sponsors
- ALCASA – Official sponsors
- Electrolit – Official sponsors

== Club records ==
- First victory in the Primera Division for Once Deportivo: 2-1 Isidro Metapan, August 17, 2019
- First goalscorer for Once Deportivo:Anthony Roque v Aguila, August 10, 2019
- First goalscorer in the Primera Division for Once Deportivo: Anthony Roque v Aguila, August 10, 2019
- Largest Home victory, Primera División: 3-0 v Chalatenango, 9 March 2020
- Largest Away victory, Primera División: 4-0 C.D. Sonsonate, November 18, 2019
- Largest Home loss, Primera División: 4-0 v El Vencedor, 25 August 2019
- Largest Away loss, Primera División: 0-6 Isidro Metapan, 18 October 2020.
- Highest home attendance: 2,000 v Primera División, 2018
- Highest away attendance: 1,000 v Primera División, San Salvador, 2018
- Highest average attendance, season: 49,176, Primera División
- Most goals scored, Apertura 2019 season, Primera División: 21, TBD, 2018
- Longest winless streak: 2025 Apertura: 10 games (3 draws and 7 loss)
- Worst season: Primera Division Apertura 2019: 3 win, 5 draws and 14 losses (14 points)
- First CONCACAF Champions League match: Once Deportivo 1–1 Communcaciones; Estadio Doroteo Guamuch Flores; 5 August 2021.

=== Individual records ===
- Record appearances (all competitions): Jorge Cruz, 123 from 2020 to Present
- Record appearances (Primera Division): Salvadoran Jorge Cruz, 123 from 2020 to Present
- Most capped player for El Salvador: 63 (0 whilst at Once Deportivo), TBD
- Most international caps for El Salvador while a Once Deportivo player: 2, Julio Sibrian and Melvin Cartagena.
- Most caps won whilst at Once Deportivo: 2, Julio Sibrian and Melvin Cartagena.
- Record scorer in league: Trinidan and Tobagon Jomal Williams, 21
- Most goals in a season (all competitions): TBD, 62 (1927/28) (47 in League, 15 in Cup competitions)
- Most goals in a season (Primera Division): David Rugamas, 12
- First goal scorer in International competition: Edgar Medrano (v. Communicaciones; Estadio Doroteo Guamuch Flores; 5 May 2021)

== Current squad ==
As of 9 March 2025: Archived 2019-07-22 at the Wayback Machine Note: Flags indicate national team as defined under FIFA eligibility rules; some limited exceptions apply. Players may hold more than one non-FIFA nationality.

No.	Pos.	Nation	Player
2	DF	ESA	Gabriel Velasquez
11	FW	JAM	Kemal Malcolm
12		ESA	Angel Ortega
14		ESA	William Flores (vice-captain)
19	MF	ESA	Enrique Vasquez
20		ESA	Brandon Martinez-Trelles
21	FW	ESA	Kevin Roman
22	MF	ESA	Steven Cerna
23	MF	ESA	Jose Emmanuel Artero
27		ESA	Juan Gil
28	MF	ESA	Jimmy Najarro (captain)
32		ESA	Julio Paulinho
37		ESA	Walter Menjivar
44		ESA	Carlos Lainez
58	MF	ESA	Diego Rosales

No.	Pos.	Nation	Player
30		ESA	Michael Antero
47		ESA	Adrian Figueroa
9		CUB	Kevin Martin
16	DF	ESA	Adrian Flores

=== Players with dual citizenship ===
- (El Salvador) (United States) Brandon Martinez-Trelles

=== Out on loan ===
Note: Flags indicate national team as defined under FIFA eligibility rules; some limited exceptions apply. Players may hold more than one non-FIFA nationality.

No.	Pos.	Nation	Player
—	MF	ESA	TBD (at TBD for the 2021-2022 season)
—	MF	ESA	TBD (at TBD for the 2021-2022 season)

No.	Pos.	Nation	Player
—	MF	ESA	TBD (at TBD for the 2021-2022 season)
—	MF	ESA	TBD (at TBD for the 2021-2022 season)

=== In ===
Note: Flags indicate national team as defined under FIFA eligibility rules; some limited exceptions apply. Players may hold more than one non-FIFA nationality.

No.	Pos.	Nation	Player
—		ESA	TBD (From TBD)
—		ESA	TBD (From TBD)
—		ESA	TBD (From TBD)
—		ESA	TBD (From TBD)
—		ESA	TBD (From TBD)
—		ESA	TBD (From TBD)

No.	Pos.	Nation	Player
—		ESA	TBD (From TBD)
—		ESA	TBD (From TBD)
—		ESA	TBD (From TBD)

=== Out ===
Note: Flags indicate national team as defined under FIFA eligibility rules; some limited exceptions apply. Players may hold more than one non-FIFA nationality.

No.	Pos.	Nation	Player
—		ESA	Diego Chavez (To FAS)
—		ESA	Nester Somoza (To Aruba)
—		ESA	Eduardo Gonzalez (To Hércules)
—		ESA	Cesar Noe Flores (To Hércules)
—		ESA	Efrain Carcamo (To Hércules)
—		ESA	Cesar Melara (To Hércules)
—		ESA	Gabriel Velasquez (To Inter FA)

No.	Pos.	Nation	Player
—		COL	Miguel Murrillo (To FAS)
—		ESA	Andres Rivas (To Inter FA)
—		TTO	Jomal Williams (To Isidro Metapan)
—		ESA	Carlos Anzora (To Isidro Metapan)
—		ESA	TBD (To TBD)

== Personnel ==
=== Coaching staff ===
As of March 2025

Position	Staff
Coach	(El Salvador) Guillermo Rivera (*)
Assistant manager	(El Salvador) Francisco Sibrian (*)
Reserve manager	(El Salvador) José Arturo Cano (*)
Goalkeeper Coach	(El Salvador) TBD (*)
Under 17 Manager	(El Salvador) TBD (*)
Under 15 Manager	(El Salvador) TBD
Sporting director	(El Salvador) TBD (*)
Fitness Coach	(El Salvador) Salvador Polanco (*)
Team Doctor	(El Salvador) Mirna Gonzalez (*)
Fitness Coach	(El Salvador) TBD (*)
Physiotherapy	(El Salvador) Leonardo Torres (*)
Utility	(El Salvador) Javier (*)

== Management ==
As of January 2025

Position	Staff
Owner	(El Salvador) Salaverría Investments SV
President	(El Salvador) Giancarlo Angelucci
Vice-president	(El Salvador) Juan Marco Escobar
Treasure	(El Salvador) Carlos Villagran
Executive secretary	(El Salvador) Deimy Franco
Director of operations	(El Salvador) TBD
Brand Representative	(El Salvador) TBD
Administrative representative	(El Salvador) TBD
Grassroots Representative	(El Salvador) TBD
Sports director	(El Salvador) TBD

== List of coaches ==
As of January 20, 2024

Name	Nat	Tenure	Win-Draw-Loss
Pablo Quiñonez	(Uruguay)	July, 2019– November 2019	3–5–14
Juan Cortez	(Spain)	December, 2019– July 2020	6–2–3
Bruno Martinez	(Mexico)	August, 2020– April 2021	13–9–9
Mario Elias Guevara	(El Salvador)	April, 2021– May 2021	see below
Carlos Romero	(El Salvador)	May, 2021– October, 2021	6–7–3
Mario Elias Guevara	(El Salvador)	October, 2021– December 2021	6–5–4
Ruben Da Silva	(Uruguay)	December 2021– June 2022	5–8–9
Rodolfo Gochez	(El Salvador)	June 2022 - October 2022	1–4–5
Erick Prado	(El Salvador)	December 2022 - December 2024	33–32–29
Fabio Gaston Larramendi	(Argentina)	January 2025 - March 2025	0–3–7
Guillermo Rivera	(El Salvador)	March 2025 - May 2025	0–0–1

=== Notable managers ===
The following managers have won at least one trophy while in charge at Once Deportivo:

Name	Nationality	From	To	Honours
Erick Prado	El Salvador	1 December 2022	28 December 2024	1 Salvadoran championships (Apertura 2024)

== Notable players ==
=== Captains ===
- Only captains in competitive matches are included.
- Players marked in **bold** are still playing in the professional team.

Captain	Nationality	Years	Notes
Christian Sanchez	El Salvador	2019	-
Raul Gonzalez	El Salvador	2020	–
Luis Copete	Nicaragua	2020	–
Julio Sibrian	El Salvador	2021-2022	–
Walter Chigüila	El Salvador	2022	–
Jesús Dautt	Mexico	2023	–
Iván Barahona	El Salvador	2023-2024	–
Josué Rivera	El Salvador	2024	Won Apertura 2024 season
Carlos Anzora	El Salvador	2025	–

=== Most appearances ===
Place	Name	Period	Primera Division	Playoffs	SLV Cup	Continental	Total
1	(El Salvador) Jorge Cruz	2020–2024	123	0	0	2	**123**
1	(El Salvador) Josue Rivera	2021–2024	118	0	0	2	**118**
2	(El Salvador) Marcelo Diaz	2020–2023	100	0	0	2	**100**
3	(El Salvador) Kevin Menjivar	2019–2022	95	2	0	2	**95**
4	(El Salvador) Melvin Cartagena	2020–2022	85	2	0	2	**85**
5	(El Salvador) Julio Sibrian	2020–2022	75	2	0	2	**75**
6	(El Salvador) Jose Enrique Contreras	2019–2020, 2021–2022	72	0	0	2	**72**
7	(El Salvador) Bryan Paz	2019–2022	72	0	0	2	**72**
8	(Colombia) **Miguel Murillo**	2023-Present	70	0	0	0	**70**
8	(El Salvador) Walter Chigüila	2019, 2021–2023	58	0	0	0	**58**
9	(Trinidad and Tobago) **Jomal Williams**	2022-2023, 2024-Present	56	0	0	2	58
10	(El Salvador) Marvin Morales	2019–2021	52	2	0	0	**52**
11	(El Salvador) Enner Orellana	2022-Present	50	0	0	0	**50**
12	(El Salvador) Yonatan Guardado	2020-2022	49	0	0	2	49
13	(El Salvador) Alexander Roque	2019–2021	43	2	0	0	**43**

Bolded players are currently on the Once Deportivo roster.

=== Goals ===
Place	Name	Period	Primera Division	Playoffs	SLV Cup	Continental	Total
1	(Trinidad and Tobago) **Jomal Williams**	2023–2024, 2024-Present	21	0	0	0	21
2	(El Salvador) Bryan Paz	2020–2022	19	0	0	0	**19**
3	(El Salvador) Josue Rivera	2021–2024	19	0	0	0	**19**
3	(El Salvador) David Rugamas	2020–2021	12	3	0	0	**15**
3	(Colombia) Edgar Medrano	2021	15	0	0	1	**15**
5	(El Salvador) Jose Enrique Contreras	2019–2020, 2021	14	0	0	0	14
6	(El Salvador) Marcelo Díaz	2020–2023	10	0	0	0	10
7	(Jamaica) Craig Foster	2021	6	0	0	0	6
8	(Jamaica) **Kemal Malcolm**	2024–Present	5	0	0	0	5
8	(El Salvador) Raul Gonzales	2019–2020	4	0	0	0	4
9	(El Salvador) Anthony Roque	2019–2021	4	0	0	0	4
10	(El Salvador) Elvin Alvarado	2020–2021	4	1	0	0	4
11	(Colombia) Victor Landázuri	2023–2024	4	0	0	0	**4**

Bolded players are currently on the Once Deportivo roster.

=== Most shutouts ===
As of March 13, 2025

Place	Name	Period	Primera Division	Playoffs	SLV Cup	Continental	Total
1	(El Salvador) Yonatan Guardado	2020–2022	15	1	0	0	**16**
2	(El Salvador) Gerson Lopez	2023–2024	15	1	0	0	**16**
3	(El Salvador) William Torres	2021–2022	10	0	0	0	**10**
4	(Mexico) Jesus Dautt	2022–2023	9	0	0	0	**9**
5	(El Salvador) Yimmy Cuellar	2019–2020	8	0	0	0	8
6	(El Salvador) Sergio Sibrian	2023	4	0	0	0	**4**
7	(El Salvador) **Cesar Melara**	2023-Present	5	0	0	0	**5**

Bolded players are currently on the Once Deportivo roster.

=== Internationals who have played at Once Deportivo ===
Players marked in bold gained their caps while playing at Once Deportivo.

- (Jamaica) **Jabari Hylton**
- (Jamaica) Kemal Malcolm
- (Panama) Abdiel Macea
- (Nicaragua) **Luis Copete**
- (El Salvador) David Rugamas
- (El Salvador) **Julio Sibrian**
- (El Salvador) **Melvin Cartagena**
- (El Salvador) **Marcelo Díaz**
- (El Salvador) **Kevin Menjívar**
- (El Salvador) **Kevin Roman**
- (El Salvador) Ivan Barahona
- (El Salvador) **Jorge Cruz**
- (El Salvador) William Maldonado
- (El Salvador) Néstor Renderos
- (El Salvador) **Rómulo Villalobos**
- (El Salvador) **David Rugamas**
- (El Salvador) Gilberto Baires
- (El Salvador) Elvin Alvarado
- (El Salvador) Cristian Sanchez
- (Trinidad and Tobago) **Jomal Williams**
