= León Rojas =

Cuban baseball manager

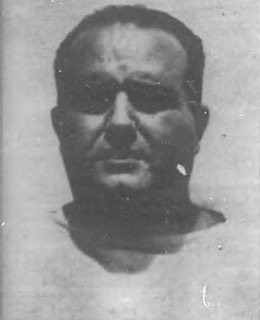
- Manager
- Born: 1907; Placetas, Villa Clara, Cuba
- Died: December 20, 1978 (aged 70–71); Cook County, Illinois, United States
Medals
Men's baseball
Manager for Cuba
Baseball World Cup
Gold medal – first place	1939 Havana	Team
Gold medal – first place	1942 Havana	Team
Gold medal – first place	1943 Havana	Team
Central American and Caribbean Games
Gold medal – first place	1935 San Salvador	Team
Gold medal – first place	1938 Panama City	Team

León Plutarco de Rojas y Cárdenas (1907 – 20 December 1978) was a Cuban baseball manager best known for managing the Cuba national baseball team, taking the reins at the 1935 Central American and Caribbean Games in El Salvador and again at the 1938 Games in Panama. He returned to lead Cuba at the 1939, 1942, and 1943 Amateur World Series (all held at the Estadio La Tropical in Havana). Rojas led Cuba to the championship in all five tournaments.

Originally from Placetas, Villa Clara, Rojas began his coaching career with Colegio de los Maristas in Cuba's collegiate league, where he managed Juan Ealo and Cocoliso Torres. He was managing Atlético de Cuba in the Cuban Amateur League in the 1930s when he was tapped to lead the Cuban national team. Rojas later managed the Artemisa and Plantas Electricas clubs. At one point, he was offered to manage Santa Clara in the professional Cuban Winter League, but declined, citing his poor English that would be necessary to manage foreign players.
