= José Meléndez (pitcher, born 1908) =

Nicaraguan baseball player (1908–1985)

- Pitcher
- Born: April 8, 1908; Managua, Nicaragua
- Died: December 4, 1985 (aged 77)
- Batted: Right Threw: Right
Medals
Representing Nicaragua
Men's baseball
Amateur World Series
Silver medal – second place	1939 Havana	Team
Silver medal – second place	1940 Havana	Team
Central American and Caribbean Games
Silver medal – second place	1935 San Salvador	Team (DNP)
Bronze medal – third place	1935 Panama City	Team

José Miguel Ángel Meléndez (April 8, 1908 – December 4, 1985), nicknamed El Chino, was a Nicaraguan baseball pitcher. He played extensively with the Nicaragua national baseball team in the 1930s and 1940s, and also played professionally in Mexico and Panama.

== Club career ==
Meléndez was raised in Las Jaguitas, on the outskirts of Managua, playing with an amateur team there as a catcher. In 1935, he signed with Indios del Bóer, and led the team to a national championship. He later played with the General Somoza club, named in honor of dictator Anastasio Somoza García, the Carazo club in 1940, and returned to Bóer from 1941 to 1945.

In January 1946, he signed a professional baseball contract with Cerveceria Nacional of the Panamanian Professional Baseball League; he worked to a 5–2 record and led the team to a championship. In 1947, he played an exhibition game against the Brooklyn Dodgers, throwing six no-hit innings against a lineup that included Pee Wee Reese, Cookie Lavagetto, Carl Furillo, Bruce Edwards, and Floyd Bevens, and even managed to drive in a run off of Dodgers starter Kirby Higbe. That year, his second season with Cerveceria Nacional, he worked to a 5–4 record.

Meléndez signed with a Mexican League team, the Tuneros de San Luis Potosí, for the 1947 season, and went on to play in the Mexican Pacific League with the Arroceros de Obregón. The next year, he moved to organized baseball in the form of the Arizona–Texas League, playing with the Indios de Ciudad Juárez in 1948 and the El Paso Texans in 1949 and 1950.

When the Nicaraguan Professional Baseball League was founded in 1956, Meléndez returned to Indios del Bóer. Despite being 48 years old, he finished the season with a 6–1 record.

== International career ==
Meléndez was named to the Nicaragua national team at the III Central American and Caribbean Games in El Salvador, but did not play due to a controversy over his professional status. He later appeared with the Nicaraguan team at four Amateur World Series tournaments (1939, 1940, 1941, and 1944), leading the team to two second place finishes in 1939 and 1940. In 1940, he led the tournament in wins (3) and finished with a 1.31 earned run average. In total, he participated in 17 Amateur World Series games with a 3–3 overall record; he worked to a 2.66 cumulative ERA over 64 innings pitched, with 23 strikeouts and 28 walks.

== Legacy ==
Meléndez was inducted into the Nicaraguan Sports Hall of Fame in 1994. Cuban manager León Rojas named Meléndez as one of the premier amateur pitchers of the 1940s, alongside figures such as Pedro "Natilla" Jiménez and Alberto Romo Chávez. Nicaraguan baseball historian Tito Rondon opined that Meléndez, in his prime, was among the players that never made the majors but were "almost certainly major-league caliber." Writing in 1958, The Sporting News described him as Nicaragua's undisputed "king of the mound for nearly 25 years."
