= Ramón Méndez (baseball) =

Cuba baseball manager

- Pitcher / Manager
- Born: Cuba
- Died: 15 July 1973; Costa Rica
Medals
Manager for Nicaragua
Men's baseball
Amateur World Series
Silver medal – second place	1939 Havana	Team
Silver medal – second place	1940 Havana	Team
Central American and Caribbean Games
Silver medal – second place	1935 San Salvador	Team
Bronze medal – third place	1938 Panama City	Team

Ramón Méndez Díaz was a Cuban baseball player and manager. Nicknamed Moncho, he was the first manager of the Nicaragua national baseball team, and also managed extensively in Costa Rica.

Méndez pitched in Cuba's semipro tobacco industry circuit, and was with Almendares of the Cuban Winter League when the team toured Nicaragua in 1935. He remained as the manager of the Nicaraguan team that traveled to the 1935 Central American and Caribbean Games, held in El Salvador, which was the country's debut in international competition. He went on to manage Nicaragua at the 1938 Games, held in Panama City, (Note: FENIBA alternatively lists Fernando Vicioso as manager for the 1938 Central American and Caribbean Games.) as well as at three editions of the Amateur World Series (later the Baseball World Cup) in 1939, 1940, and 1941 (all in Havana).

Méndez also managed Chinandega in the Nicaragua's amateur First Division. He eventually relocated to Costa Rica, where he went on to become a longtime manager of the Costa Rica national baseball team, including at several editions of the Amateur World Series: 1945, 1950, 1951, 1952 and 1961 (the latter held in San José). He also managed Costa Rica at the 1946 Central American and Caribbean Games. One account described him as "the Casey Stengel of Costa Rica." He retired as a baseball promoter and manager in Costa Rica in 1969, and died there in 1973.
