= Pedro Jiménez (baseball) =

Cuban baseball player (1918–1979)

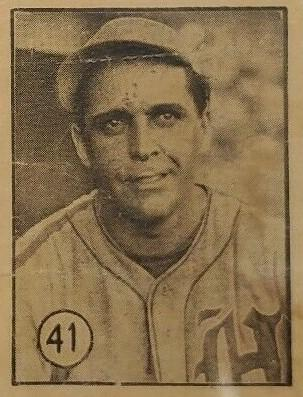
- Pitcher / manager
- Born: 1918; Santa Cruz del Norte, Mayabeque, Cuba
- Died: March 8, 1979 (aged 60–61); Havana, Cuba
- Batted: Right Threw: Right

Career highlights and awards
- Amateur World Series MVP (1943)
Medals
Representing Cuba
Men's baseball
Baseball World Cup
Gold medal – first place	1939 Havana	Team
Gold medal – first place	1940 Havana	Team
Gold medal – first place	1942 Havana	Team
Gold medal – first place	1943 Havana	Team
Silver medal – second place	1941 Havana	Team
Central American and Caribbean Games
Gold medal – first place	1938 Panama City	Team

Pedro Jiménez Díaz (1918 – March 8, 1979), nicknamed "Natilla", was a Cuban baseball pitcher. During his prime, he was considered one of the best amateur baseball players in Cuba.

Born in Santa Cruz del Norte, Jiménez debuted with the Hershey Club on May 16, 1936, after being discovered by Joaquín Viego, Hershey's manager. Jiménez led Hershey to three consecutive championships (1938, 1939 and 1940) in Cuba's amateur baseball league, which at the time enjoyed more popularity than the professional Cuban League. He turned professional in 1944, playing with Habana, being named rookie of the year despite a 6–6 record. The following season, also with Havana, he finished with a record of 13–7. That season, he led the league in wins (13) and in games pitched (32).

In the United States, he played with the Portsmouth Cubs (affiliate of the Chicago Cubs) and the Indianapolis Indians (affiliate of the Boston Braves), working to a 3.77 earned run average with the Indians in 1945. He reportedly rejected an offer to sign with the major league Cleveland Indians and went to play in Mexico for the 1946 season.

Jiménez represented Cuba in four Amateur World Series championships from 1939 to 1943, as well as at the 1938 Central American and Caribbean Games in Panama. Cuba won three of the four tournaments, thanks to the pitching core of Jiménez, Conrado Marrero, Julio Moreno, and Rogelio Martínez. Cuban manager León Rojas named Jiménez as one of the "pitchers of caliber" of international baseball in the 1940s.

After his playing career ended, Jiménez went on to manage the Orientales team of the Cuban National Series, which replaced the professional league after the Cuban Revolution. After three seasons with Orientales, he went on to work as a pitching coach with Pinar del Rio and later with the Azucareros, of Las Villas Province, where he coached and scouted under Servio Borges.

Jiménez died of kidney failure at Havana's Camilo Cienfuegos Hospital on March 8, 1979, at the age of 61. He was inducted into the Cuban Exile Baseball Hall of Fame in 2007. (Note: Cuban Baseball Hall of Fame inductions between 1962 and 2007 are not formally recognized by the Baseball Federation of Cuba) A stadium in Santa Clara, Cuba is named in his honor.
