= Rafael Almeida (baseball) =

Cuban baseball player (1887–1968)

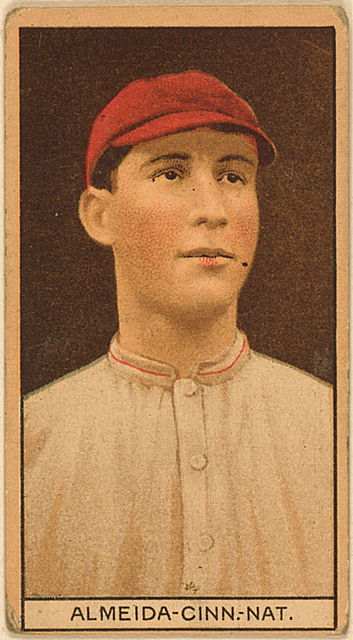
- Rafael Almeida, 1912.
- Third baseman
- Born: July 30, 1887; Havana, Captaincy General of Cuba
- Died: March 19, 1968 (aged 80); Havana, Cuba
- Batted: Right Threw: Right

MLB debut
- July 4, 1911, for the Cincinnati Reds

Last MLB appearance
- July 18, 1913, for the Cincinnati Reds

MLB statistics
- Batting average: .270
- Home runs: 3
- Runs batted in: 46
- Stats at Baseball Reference

Teams
- Cincinnati Reds (1911–1913)

Member of the Cuban

Baseball Hall of Fame
- Induction: 1939
Medals
Manager for Cuba
Central American and Caribbean Games
Gold medal – first place	1930 Havana	Team

Rafael D. Almeida (July 30, 1887 – March 19, 1968) was a Cuban professional baseball third baseman from 1911 to 1913 with the Cincinnati Reds of Major League Baseball (MLB). Along with Armando Marsans, he was one of the first Cuban nationals to play in the National League when the two debuted with the Reds on July 4, 1911. (Note: Almeida and Marsansa were not the first National League players born in Cuba, as Havana-born Chick Pedroes played in the National League in 1902, though historian Peter C. Bjarkman noted that Pedroes immigrated to the United States at a young age and likely did not learn the game in Cuba. In addition, Cuban-born Steve Bellán played from 1871 to 1873 in the National Association of Professional Base Ball Players (NA), a league whose status as a major league is disputed.)

Six years before debuting with Cincinnati, Almeida and Marsans both played Negro league baseball in the United States as members of the integrated All Cubans in 1905. He also played winter league baseball in the Cuban League from 1904 to 1925.

After his professional career, Almeida managed the Vedado Tennis Club to several pennant victories in the Cuban Amateur League. He also acted as manager of the champion Cuba national baseball team at the 1930 Central American Games in Havana. Almeida was one of ten players elected to the Cuban Baseball Hall of Fame in its 1939 inaugural class.

== Bibliography ==
- Figueredo, Jorge S. (2003), Cuban Baseball: A Statistical History, 1878–1961, Jefferson, North Carolina: McFarland & Company, ISBN 0-7864-1250-X.
- Riley, James A. (2002). The Biographical Encyclopedia of the Negro Baseball Leagues. 2nd edition. New York: Carroll & Graf Publ. ISBN 0-7867-0959-6.
