= 1942 Amateur World Series =

Tournament details
- Country: Cuba
- Venue(s): 1 (in 1 host city)
- Dates: 26 September – 20 October
- Teams: 5
- Defending champions: Venezuela

Final positions
- Champions: Cuba (3rd title)
- Runners-up: Dominican Republic
- Third place: Venezuela
- Fourth place: Mexico

Tournament statistics
- Games played: 30 (Note: Because the United States withdrew and forfeited its last four games, the number of games contested was actually 26)

Awards
- MVP: (Cuba) Andrés Fleitas

The 1942 Amateur World Series was the fifth edition of the Amateur World Series (AWS), an international men's amateur baseball tournament. The tournament was sanctioned by the International Baseball Federation (which titled it the Baseball World Cup as of the 1988 tournament). The tournament took place, for the fourth consecutive time, in Cuba. It was contested by four national teams playing twelve games each from September 26 through October 20 in Havana. Cuba won its third AWS title.

There was a noticeably lower participation of teams, in part due to the effects of World War II. The United States withdrew part-way and forfeited their last four games; it would be the last Amateur World Series contested by the U.S. until the 1969 Amateur World Series.

== Tournament summary ==
The Cuban squad, managed by León Rojas, beat defending champion Venezuela, avenging a disappointing loss the previous year, with Connie Marrero out pitching Daniel Canónico. The Dominican Republic had a strong finish to win the Silver Medal and beat Cuba in 2 of 3 match-ups. Venezuela failed in their attempt to defend their title. Luis Aparicio, Sr., father of future Hall of Famer Luis Aparicio, played shortstop. Mexico earned just three wins, finishing in fourth place.

Unlike previous editions, the United States team was not selected by the U.S.A. Baseball Congress, but was instead represented by the Dade County Airmen, an Eastern Air Lines amateur club from Miami. Player-manager Joel Tierce was one of the few players with minor league experience. The U.S. was heavily outmatched during the series, suffering two blowout losses to Cuba (20–0 and 17–0), and winning only two games, against Mexico on Oct. 5 (6–1) and its final game against the Dominican Republic on Oct. 11 (3–1).

The Oct. 11 game would become notorious due to a brawl between the Dominican team and members of the crowd, which were cheering for the American team; Dominican manager Luis Ernesto Rodríguez, who was being heckled by the crowd with his nickname "Burrulote" (meaning "big donkey"), angrily threw an errant ball and a bat into the stands, causing the crowd to surge onto the field. The police quickly intervened to maintain order, and Rodriguez was arrested on the field. Dominican dictator Rafael Trujillo reportedly ordered his team to withdraw, but the organizing committee managed to get him to change his decision. Nevertheless, the U.S. team withdrew from the tournament immediately after the game, forfeiting their last four games (though contemporary accounts cite U.S. government travel restrictions, not the Rodriguez incident, as the cause).

Cuban catcher Andrés Fleitas hit .405 (15-for-37) and was named Most Valuable Player, while pitchers Julio Moreno and Isidoro León won three games apiece and posted sub 2.00 earned run averages. Luis Suárez batted .579 (11-for-19) and Juan Ealo hit .375 and led the series with four doubles.

Instead of the John Moores Cup, the Cuban team was awarded the "Copa Presidente Batista," renamed by Col. Jaime Mariné (head of the International Baseball Federation) in honor of Cuban president Fulgencio Batista.

== Venue ==
Havana, Cuba	1942 Amateur World Series is located in Cuba
Gran Stadium Cervecería Tropical	1942 Amateur World Series is located in Cuba
Capacity: 15,000	1942 Amateur World Series is located in Cuba

== Final standings ==
Pos.	Team	W	L
1	Cuba	10	2
2	Dominican Republic	9	3
3	Venezuela	7	5
4	Mexico	3	9
5	United States	1	11

== Bibliography ==
- Bjarkman, Peter C., 2005. Diamonds Around the Globe: The Encyclopedia of International Baseball. Greenwood Publishing Group. ISBN 978-0-313-32268-6
