= Reinaldo Cordeiro (baseball) =

Cuban baseball coach (1910–1990)

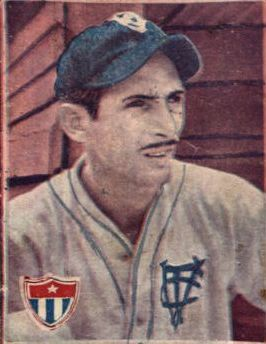
- Manager
- Born: October 3, 1910; Havana, Cuba
- Died: January 8, 1990 (aged 79); Miami, Florida, U.S.
- Batted: Right Threw: Right
Medals
Men's baseball
Manager for Cuba
Baseball World Cup
| Gold medal – first place | 1940 Havana | Team |

Reinaldo Cordeiro (October 3, 1910 — January 8, 1990) was a Cuban baseball player and manager. He managed the Cuba national baseball team at the 1940 Amateur World Series.

Cordeiro began his playing career as a catcher. He played with Club Fortuna in the Cuban Amateur League, and later managed the team to several amateur league titles. He also managed the Vedado Tennis Club team, until jumping to the professional Cuban Winter League as skipper for Almendares, replacing longtime manager Adolfo Luque. He led Almendares to a championship in 1945.

Cordeiro managed Chihuahua and Ciudad Juárez in the Mexican National League in 1945, and Laguneros de Torreón in 1946. He was a coach with Almendares under Fermin Guerra, until being appointed manager of Marianao partway through the 1948–49 season, safter hte firing of Gil Torres. He later coached with the Havana Sugar Kings of the International League, resigning along with manager Tony Castaño when the team moved to Jersey City in 1960 due to the Cuban Revolution.

While coaching in Venezuela with the Industriales de Valencia, Cordeiro signed Elio Chacón to a minor league contract for the Havana Sugar Kings. He was named manager of the Leones del Caracas for the 1958–59 season. He also coached for Tiburones de La Guaira, briefly serving as interim manager after the firing of Dave Garcia in the 1971–72 season.

Cordeiro died on January 8, 1990 in Miami.
