= Stanley Cayasso =

Nicaraguan baseball player (1906–1986)

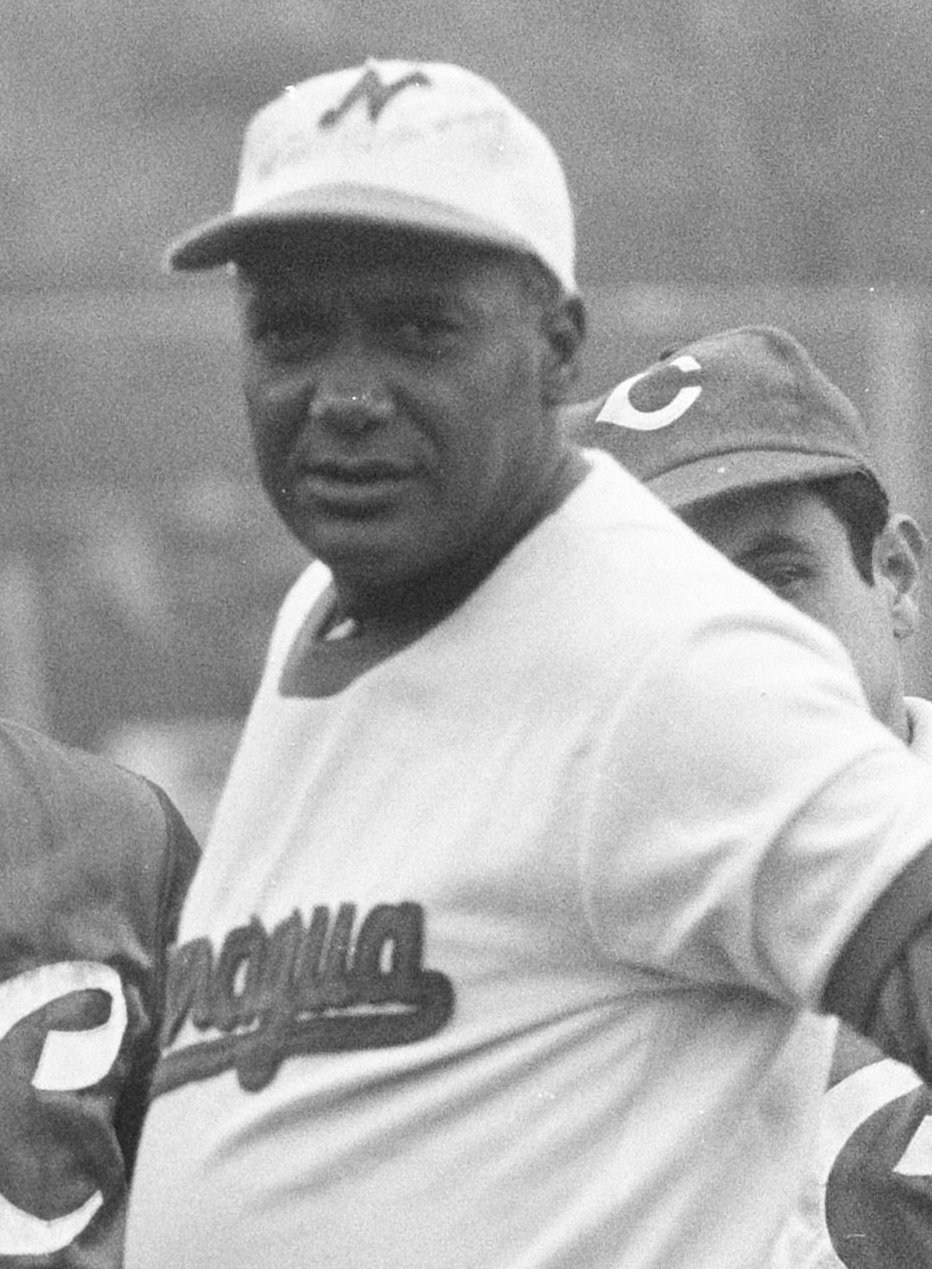
- Cayasso at the 1972 Haarlem Baseball Week
- Infielder
- Born: December 4, 1917; Bluefields, Atlantico Sur, Nicaragua
- Died: August 4, 1986 (aged 79)
- Batted: Left Threw: Left
Medals
Representing Nicaragua
Men's baseball
Amateur World Series
Silver medal – second place	1939 Havana	Team
Silver medal – second place	1940 Havana	Team
Bronze medal – third place	1947 Cartagena	Team
Bronze medal – third place	1953 Caracas	Team
Central American and Caribbean Games
Silver medal – second place	1935 San Salvador	Team
Bronze medal – third place	1938 Panama City	Team
Bronze medal – third place	1950 Guatemala City	Team

Oliver Stanley Livingstone Cayasso Guerrero (September 17, 1906 – August 4, 1986) was a Nicaraguan baseball player active from the 1930s to the 1950s. Along with Dennis Martínez, he is commonly cited as one of the best Nicaraguan baseball players of all time.

Born in Bluefields in eastern Nicaragua, Cayasso's "Navy" team played a barnstorming tour of the country's Pacific coast in the early 1930s, which is cited as the catalyst for baseball's popularity in the country. Cayasso played the 1933 season for Managua, and later joined the "General Somoza" club, named after the country's dictator Anastasio Somoza García. In 1941, he joined the Cinco Estrellas club; technically part of the Nicaraguan National Guard, Cayasso's on-field performance saw him promoted to the rank of lieutenant.

Cayasso played as an amateur for the vast majority of his career, eschewing professional baseball opportunities in Mexico and the American Negro leagues due to a desire to represent Nicaragua in international competition. He was part of the first ever Nicaragua national baseball team that played at the 1935 Central American and Caribbean Games. He would represent the country at several international tournaments, including eleven Amateur World Series from 1939 to 1953. After his playing career ended, Cayasso managed the Nicaragua national team at the 1965 and 1969 Amateur World Series. He also managed Cinco Estrellas to 10 championships.

Cayasso was inducted into the Nicaraguan Sports Hall of Fame on August 2, 1994. The former national stadium of Nicaragua, built in 1948, was renamed the Estadio Stanley Cayasso in 2018, after the construction of the nearby Estadio Nacional Dennis Martínez. Connie Marrero, who faced Cayasso in the Amateur World Series, commented that "I am sure that Cayasso would have been a bright light in whatever league. He is the best Nicaraguan player that I have seen."
