= Jorge Torres (baseball) =

Cuban baseball player

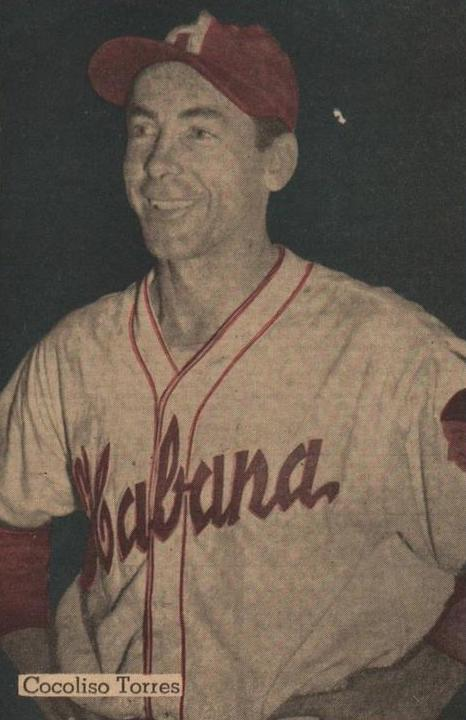
- Infielder / Outfielder
- Born: June 18, 1918; Havana, Cuba
- Died: June 5, 1982 (aged 63)
- Batted: Right Threw: Right
- Stats at Baseball Reference

Career highlights and awards
- Amateur World Series MVP (1939)
Medals
Men's baseball
Representing Cuba
Amateur World Series
Gold medal – first place	1939 Havana	Team
Central American and Caribbean Games
Gold medal – first place	1938 Panama City	Team

Jorge Juan Torres Tur (Note: Alternatively listed as Juan J. Torres by Bjarkman and others.) (June 18, 1918 — June 5, 1982), nicknamed Cocoliso, was a Cuban professional baseball player. He played on the Cuba national baseball team at the 1939 Amateur World Series, and later played in the Cuban Winter League as well as several seasons in the minor leagues.

Cocoliso Torres played with the Cubaneleco (Cuban Electric Company) club of the Cuban Amateur League. He was selected to the Cuban squad that won gold at the 1938 Central American and Caribbean Games in Panama City, going 1–for–5. He also appeared with Cuba at the 1939 Amateur World Series, the country's first major international tournament and the first held on home soil. Though he posted a dismal .174 batting average over the course of the series, going 4–for–23, he hit a triple in the ninth inning of the opening match against Nicaragua, eventually scoring the game-winning run; that performance was enough to secure him most valuable player honors.

Torres made his professional baseball debut in the Cuban Winter League with Almendares. By the 1946–47 season, he played as an infielder with Habana.

Debuting in organized baseball with the Washington Senators organization in 1940, Torres played in the South Atlantic, Appalachian, and Florida State Leagues that year. He went on to play in the Class-A Eastern League before signing with the New York Giants, playing with Jersey City in the International League. He returned to the Washington organization in 1945, playing with the Chattanooga Lookouts of the Southern Association. He went on to play in the Mexican League with Monterrey and San Luis Potosí and in 1946 and 1947. Torres returned to organized baseball with the Philadelphia Athletics organization before retiring.
