= Pedro Orta =

Cuban baseball player

- Infielder / Outfielder
- Born: 31 January 1914; Pinar del Río, Cuba
- Died: 12 August 2001 (aged 87); Torreón, Coahuila, Mexico
- Batted: Right Threw: Right

Career highlights and awards
- Algodoneros de Unión Laguna #6 retired
Medals
Representing Cuba
Men's baseball
Amateur World Series
Gold medal – first place	1940 Havana	Team

Pedro Clodomiro "Charolito" Orta (31 January 1914 – 12 August 2001) was a Cuban professional baseball infielder and outfielder. He played four seasons in the Cuban League, from 1943 to 1947, before moving to the Mexican League, where he spent eight seasons until 1954.

== Career ==
Orta was born in Pinar del Río, Cuba on 31 January 1914. He was part of the Cuban national team that won the 1940 Amateur World Series and made his professional debut in the Cuban League with the Tigres de Marianao during the 1943–44 season. He played three more seasons with Marianao.

In 1946, Orta moved to Mexico to play with the Alijadores de Tampico of the Mexican League. In 1949 he played for the Diablos Rojos del México and Unión Laguna de Torreón. In 1950, he was part of the Torreón team that won the Mexican League championship and he also led the league in stolen bases with 34. In 1954, Orta transferred to the Leones de Yucatán and retired after the end of the season.

He finished his Mexican League career with 500 games played, a .301 batting average, 76 doubles, 37 triples and 137 stolen bases. He also played winter baseball in Mexico with the Venados de Mazatlán and Mayos de Navojoa.

Orta died on 12 August 2001 in Torreón, Coahuila. A sports complex in Torreón, Unidad Deportiva Aeropuerto Pedro “Charolito” Orta, was named in his honor.

The Algodoneros retired Orta's number 6.

== Personal life ==
His son Jorge played 16 seasons in Major League Baseball, from 1972 to 1987 with the Chicago White Sox, Cleveland Indians, Los Angeles Dodgers, Toronto Blue Jays, and Kansas City Royals, winning the 1985 World Series with the Royals.

== Career statistics ==
=== Cuban League ===
Season	Team	G	AB	R	H	2B	3B	HR	RBI	SB	BA
1943–44	Marianao		17	1	4	0	0	0	2	0	.235
1944–45	Marianao		20	3	7	1	1	0	3	0	.350
1945–46	Marianao		74	8	23	1	1	1	9	2	.311
1946–47	Marianao		31	3	6	0	0	0	1	0	.194
Total (4 seasons)			142	15	40	2	2	1	15	2	.282

Source: Who's Who in Cuban Baseball, 1878-1961

=== Mexican League ===
Season	Team	G	AB	R	H	2B	3B	HR	RBI	SB	BB	BA	SLG
1946	Tampico	75	286	33	81	10	6	1	26	11	22	.283	.371
1947	Tampico	11	28	2	3	1	0	0	2	0	6	.107	.143
1949	México / Torreón	77	287	37	94	6	8	2	40	25	62	.328	.425
1950	Torreón	87	343	60	104	12	8	0	50	34	44	.303	.385
1951	Torreón	84	302	63	90	11	4	0	35	18	65	.298	.361
1952	Torreón	87	325	67	101	20	8	3	45	16	58	.311	.449
1953	Torreón	58	213	46	66	10	2	1	28	28	35	.310	.390
1954	Yucatán	21	76	9	21	6	1	0	12	5	13	.276	.382
Total (8 seasons)		500	1860	317	560	76	37	7	238	137	305	.282	.393

Source: Enciclopedia del Beisbol Mexicano
