= Tomás de la Noval =

Cuban baseball player (1914–1981)

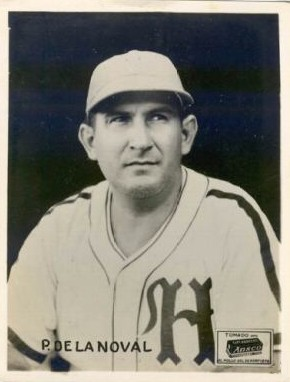
- Outfielder
- Born: January 22, 1914; Guanabacoa, Cuba
- Died: February 25, 1981 (aged 67); Miami, Florida

Negro league baseball debut
- 1935, for the Cuban Stars (East)

Last appearance
- 1935, for the Cuban Stars (East)

Teams
- Cuban Stars (East) (1935)

Tomás Vicente de la Noval (January 22, 1914 – February 25, 1981), nicknamed Pipo, was a Cuban outfielder who played in the Negro leagues in the 1930s.

A native of Guanabacoa, Cuba, de la Noval played for the Cuban Stars (East) in 1935. In three recorded games, he posted two hits in six plate appearances.

He managed in the Cuban Amateur League with Deportivo Matanzas. With a pitching staff anchored by the "Three Musketeers" (Rogelio Martínez, Sandy Consuegra, and Angel González), de la Noval lead the team to two titles in 1943 and 1945. De la Noval also managed the Cuba national baseball team at the 1944 Amateur World Series in Caracas, Venezuela; the team withdrew halfway through due to disagreements about umpiring decisions at the tournament.

After the Cuban Revolution ended professional baseball in the country, de la Noval became the first manager of Industriales, though in a regional tournament he failed to qualify for the inaugural 1962 Cuban National Series.

De la Noval was inducted into the Cuban Exile Baseball Hall of Fame in 2007. (Note: Cuban Baseball Hall of Fame inductions between 1962 and 2007 are not formally recognized by the Baseball Federation of Cuba) He died in Miami, Florida in 1981 at age 67.
