= Ule Mahoney =

Panamanian baseball player (born 1917)

- Pitcher / First baseman / Left fielder
- Born: 1917; Panama
- Batted: Left Threw: Left

Negro league baseball debut
- 1944, for the Philadelphia Stars

Last appearance
- 1944, for the Philadelphia Stars

Teams
- Philadelphia Stars (1944)
Medals
Men's baseball
Representing Panama
Central American and Caribbean Games
| Silver medal – second place | 1938 Panama City | Team |
| Silver medal – second place | 1935 San Salvador | Team |

Ulises Mahoney (1917 – unknown) was a Panamanian professional baseball pitcher, first baseman and left fielder in the Negro leagues who played in the 1940s.

Mahoney played for the Philadelphia Stars in 1944. In 11 recorded games, he posted eight hits and four RBI in 28 plate appearances.
