= Juan Ealo =

Cuban baseball player

- First baseman
- Born: October 12, 1912; Camagüey, Cuba
- Died: December 22, 1997 (aged 85); Havana, Cuba
- Batted: Right Threw: Right
Medals
Representing Cuba
Men's baseball
Baseball World Cup
Gold medal – first place	1942 Havana	Team
Bronze medal – third place	1944 Caracas	Team

Juan Ealo de la Herrán (October 22, 1912 – December 22, 1997) was a Cuban baseball player and coach. A slugging first baseman who spent most of his career in Cuba's amateur league, he earned the nickname Espinacas ("Spinach") for his physical resemblance to Popeye.

Ealo played largely with the successful Fortuna club, playing alongside Luis Suárez and Preston Gómez. He led the league in home runs in 1935 (with 5) and the club won the league championship in 1936 and 1937. In 1940, he batted .333, with 9 runs scored, 8 RBIs and 4 doubles. In 1942 he batted .388, with 5 doubles, 5 triples, 18 runs scored and 12 RBIs. In 1944 he had his best season, batting .500 with 2 doubles, 2 triples, 2 home runs, 17 runs scored and 14 RBIs. In 1945 he was again among the best, batting .357 and leading the lead in walks (41).

He played for the Cuban national baseball team in the 1942 Amateur World Series, hitting .375 and leading the tournament with four doubles, helping his team win Gold. In the 1944 Amateur World Series, he hit .206. He managed the Nicaragua national team for part of the 1948 Amateur World Series before being fired by Nicaraguan dictator Anastasio Somoza García, who assumed managerial duties himself.

He was born in Camagüey, Cuba and died in Havana, Cuba.
