= Jamaica national baseball team =

National baseball team of Jamaica

Information
- Country: Jamaica
- Federation: Jamaica Baseball Association
- Confederation: WBSC America

WBSC ranking
- Current: NR (26 March 2026)

The Jamaica national baseball team is the national baseball team of Jamaica. The team represents Jamaica in international competitions.

Jamaica was invited to the 1939 Amateur World Series, held in Havana, Cuba, but did not attend.
