= Joel Tierce =

American baseball player and manager

- Infielder / manager
- Born: March 23, 1912 (Note: Listed as 1916 by Baseball Reference); Bartow County, Georgia, U.S.
- Died: Lake County, Florida, U.S. February 19, 2002 (aged 89)
- Batted: Right Threw: Unknown

Joel Warren Tierce (March 23, 1912 — February 19, 2002) was an American baseball player and manager. He steered the Eastern Air Lines amateur club that made up the United States national baseball team at the 1942 Amateur World Series in Havana, Cuba.

Tierce, a native of Bartow County, Georgia, played baseball with various local youth, amateur, and semipro teams in Atlanta, and was a boyhood teammate of future Chicago Cub Hugh Casey. He attended Georgia Tech, where he played baseball and basketball. He signed a professional baseball contract with the Atlanta Crackers of the Southern Association in 1936. He played with the Moultrie Packers of the Georgia–Florida League in 1936 and again in 1938, and with the New Bern Bears of the Coastal Plain League in 1939.

He eventually relocated to Miami, where he worked with Eastern Air Lines and managed their amateur club, the Dade County Airmen. Tierce and the Airmen were selected to represent the United States at the 1942 Amateur World Series. The heavily-overmatched U.S. team withdrew from the tournament early, forfeiting their last four games; contemporary accounts cite wartime travel restrictions, though other sources suggest the decision was influenced by an on-field brawl during a game between the U.S. and the Dominican Republic. Speaking to The Miami News, Tierce recounted the brawl but did not mention the United States's early withdrawal.

Tierce continued to coach Dade County and eventually became Florida’s state commissioner for the National Baseball Congress of semipro teams. After his baseball career ended, he operated a sporting goods store in Hialeah, where he twice ran for mayor, in 1951 and 1953 (both times unsuccessfully).
