= Vic Barnett =

Panamanian baseball player (born 1914)

- Right fielder
- Born: 1914; Colón, Panama
- Died: Unknown; Unknown
- Batted: Right Threw: Right

Negro league baseball debut
- 1944, for the Newark Eagles

Last appearance
- 1944, for the Newark Eagles
- Stats at Baseball Reference

Teams
- Newark Eagles (1944)
Medals
Men's baseball
Representing Panama
Central American and Caribbean Games
Silver medal – second place	1938 Panama	Team

Victor Barnett Lobo (1914 – death date unknown) was a Panamanian professional baseball right fielder in the Negro leagues. He played with the Newark Eagles in 1944.
