= Cuban Amateur League =

Cuban baseball league from 1914 to 1960

- Sport: Baseball
- Founded: 1914
- Folded: 1960
- Replaced by: Cuban National Series
- Country: Cuba

The Cuban Amateur League (Spanish: Liga Nacional de Béisbol Amateur, lit. "National Amateur Baseball League") was a baseball circuit active in Cuba from 1914 to 1960. At its peak during the 1920s, 1930s, and 1940s, it was a major competitor to the professional Cuban Winter League in terms of talent and popularity.

== History ==
Baseball in Cuba originated at the amateur level; storied winter league teams like Almendares and Habana originated as social clubs before evolving into professional sides. Though this circuit evolved into the professional Cuban Winter League by the turn of the 20th century, which was largely played in Havana, there continued to be baseball played by amateur, semi-pro, and sugar mill teams that, according to historian Peter C. Bjarkman, was in many cases at the same level of play as the professional league

The "Liga Nacional" was originally formed as the top-level nationwide amateur tournament in 1914, with Vedado Tennis Club taking the inaugural pennant. In 1917, the league received official government sanction, bringing under the Unión Atlética Amateur de Cuba in 1922.

The Amateur League produced a high level of talent, including several players that would go on to play in Major League Baseball such as Conrado Marrero, Julio "Jiqui" Moreno, Sandalio Consuegra, Rogelio "Limonar" Martínez, and others. Other players, such as Pedro "Natilla" Jiménez and Antonio "Quilla" Valdés, had fleeting pro careers or eschewed professionalism entirely, but were nevertheless stars of the game in Cuba, rivaling their professional counterparts. After the Boston Red Sox lost to a Cuban amateur team in 1941, manager Joe Cronin reportedly said, "They may be amateurs, but many are better than our players."

Unlike the professional Cuban League, the amateur league was segregated for much of its existence. This partially stemmed from the fact that the exclusive social clubs that initially made up the league had their membership excluded to whites. However, amateur clubs would periodically play exhibitions against racially-integrated sugarmill and semi-pro teams.

The Amateur League enjoyed its peak of popularity in the early 1940s, when its best players formed the basis of the Cuba national baseball team at the Amateur World Series tournaments, held in Havana from 1939 to 1943. However, the league began to decline towards the end of World War II due to a variety of factors: MLB scouts such as Joe Cambria made it a priority to sign Cuban ballplayers, including those from the amateur leagues, leading to many star players turning pro.

Records and statistics for the Amateur League are incomplete, and, according to Bjarkman, historical studies of Cuban baseball have largely marginalized the amateur league in favor of the professional Cuban Winter League. However, the league was recently commemorated when the Vedado Tennis Club site was chosen for the re-establishment of the Cuban Baseball Hall of Fame in 2015.

== Teams ==
Vedado Tennis Club (the "Marqueses") and Central Hershey ("Azucareros") tied for the most championships in the Amateur League, with seven each. The University of Havana team, fielding a collegiate team nicknamed the "Caribes", won five titles over the course of the league's existence.

- Vedado Tennis Club
- Instituto de La Habana
- Sociedad de Marianao
- Club Atlético de Cuba
- Fortuna BBC
- Regla BBC
- Central Hershey
- Deportivo Matanzas
- Club Telefónos
- Círculo Militar y Naval
- Círculo de Artesanos

== Champions (1914–1960) ==
Season	Champions	Record	Manager
1914	Vedado Tennis Club	13–3	Gustavo de Zaldo
1915	Vedado Tennis Club (2)	12–3	Gustavo de Zaldo
1916	Vedado Tennis Club (3)	16–4	Ignacio Zayas
1917	Atlético de Cuba	9–2	Gustavo Gutiérrez
1918	Club Bellamar de Matanzas	13–3	E. González
1919	Atlético de Cuba (2)	18–4	Gustavo Gutiérrez
1920	Cienfuegos Sports Club	19–4	C. Esquivel
1921	Fortuna Sports Club	15–3–1	Juan Albear
1922	Fortuna Sports Club (2)	14–5	Alfonso Peña
1923	Universidad de La Habana Caribes	16–1–2	G. Kendrigan
1924	Atlético de la Policía	14–4	Horacio Alonso
1925	Vedado Tennis Club (4)	17–5-2	Rafael Almeida
1926	Vedado Tennis Club (5)	20–7-1	Rafael Almeida
1927	Vedado Tennis Club (6)	16–5	Rafael Almeida
1928	Vedado Tennis Club (7)	17–4	Rafael Almeida
1929	Universidad de La Habana Caribes (2)	23–5	Oscar Ortiz
1930	Universidad de La Habana Caribes (3)	12–3	Oscar Ortiz
1931	Club Telefónos	18–3–1	Octavio Diviño
1932	Hershey Sport Club	18–2–1	Joaquín Viego
1933	Regla Base Ball Club	15–7-1	José López
1934	Hershey Sport Club (2)	17–3	Joaquín Viego
1935	Hershey Sport Club (3)	20–5	Joaquín Viego
1936	Fortuna Sport Club (3)	14–5-2	Reinaldo Cordeiro
1937	Fortuna Sport Club (4)	13–6–1	Reinaldo Cordeiro
1938	Hershey Sport Club (4)	21–3	Joaquín Viego
1939	Hershey Sport Club (5)	21–5–1	Joaquín Viego
1940	Hershey Sport Club (6)	20–5	Joaquín Viego
1941	Cienfuegos	18–6-1	Candido González
1942	Círculo Militar y Naval	22–5	Evelio Miranda
1943	Deportivo Matanzas	23–5–2	Pipo de la Noval
1944	Círculo de Artesanos	26–3-1	José R. Castañeda
1945	Deportivo Matanzas (2)	27–4-2	Pipo de la Noval
1946	Universidad de La Habana Caribes (4)	26–5-2	Víctor Muñoz
1947	Deportivo Rosario	23–3	Lorenzo Fernández
1948	Hershey Sport Club (7)	17–4-2	Joaquín Viego
1949	Universidad de La Habana Caribes (5)	20–4	Víctor Muñoz
1950	Club Telefónos (2)	20–3-1	Oscar Reyes
1951	Club Telefónos (3)	20–3	Oscar Reyes
1952	Cubaneleco	20–4-1	Manuel de le Fuente
1953	Cubaneleco (2)	25–5	Manuel de le Fuente
1954	Cubaneleco (3)	24–7-1	Manuel de le Fuente
1955	Liceo de Regla	9–1–1	Jesús Mera
1956	Santiago de Las Vegas	26–2–1	Oscar del Calvo
1957	Artemisa	20–5-1	Abelardo Gómez
1959	Regla Baseball Club (2)	19–5-1	Antonio Suarez
1959	Artemisa (2)	20–3–1	Francisco Quicutis
1960	Club Telefónos (4)	15–2–1	Oscar Garmendia

== See also ==
- Cuban baseball league system
- List of Cuban baseball champions

== Bibliography ==
- Bjarkman, Peter C. (2007). A History of Cuban Baseball, 1964–2006. McFarland. pp. 152–158, 189–193.
- González Echevarría, Roberto (1999). The Pride of Havana: A History of Cuban Baseball. Oxford University Press. ISBN 9780195069914.
