= 1939 Amateur World Series =

Tournament details
- Country: Cuba
- Venue: 1 (in 1 host city)
- Dates: 12–26 August
- Teams: 3
- Defending champions: Great Britain

Final positions
- Champions: Cuba (1st title)
- Runners-up: Nicaragua
- Third place: United States

Tournament statistics
- Games played: 9

Awards
- MVP: (Cuba) Cocoliso Torres

The 1939 Amateur World Series was the second Amateur World Series (AWS), an international men's amateur baseball tournament. The tournament was sanctioned by the International Baseball Federation (which titled it the Baseball World Cup as of the 1988 tournament). Great Britain did not defend the AWS title it had won in the inaugural event the previous year. The tournament took place, for the first time, in Cuba. It was contested by the national teams of Cuba, Nicaragua and the United States, playing six games each from August 12 through August 26. Cuba won its first AWS title – the first of what would be a record 26 titles by the time the series ended in 2011, 22 more titles than the next closest nation.

== Participants ==
The second Amateur World Series was announced on June 11, 1939. In addition to the United States and Great Britain, which had participated in the inaugural tournament held the previous year, the International Baseball Federation (IBF) hope to increase the visibility of the tournament by inviting thirteen other countries, all of them in the Western Hemisphere. However, only two federations accepted, those of Cuba and Nicaragua; Great Britain, the defending champions, declined for the sake of their domestic league, which began in August of that year. IBF president Leslie Mann was particularly disappointed by Britain's exit from the tournament; they would not return until the 2009 Baseball World Cup.

=== Invited teams ===
Caribbean (1)

- Cuba (hosts)
- ~~Puerto Rico~~ (did not attend)
- ~~Haiti~~ (did not attend)
- ~~Jamaica~~ (did not attend)

Europe (0)

- ~~Great Britain~~ (did not attend)

North America (2)

- United States
- Nicaragua
- ~~Mexico~~ (did not attend)
- ~~Panama~~ (did not attend)
- ~~Honduras~~ (did not attend)
- ~~El Salvador~~ (did not attend)
- ~~Guatemala~~ (did not attend)

South America (0)

- ~~Venezuela~~ (did not attend)
- ~~Colombia~~ (did not attend)
- ~~Peru~~ (did not attend)

Though only three federations participated in the 1939 edition, most of the invitees would participate in future tournaments, starting with the following year's edition. (Note: Jamaica, Haiti, and Peru never participated in an Amateur World Series or Baseball World Cup.)

== Venue ==
Havana, Cuba	1939 Amateur World Series is located in Cuba
Gran Stadium Cervecería Tropical	1939 Amateur World Series is located in Cuba
Capacity: 15,000	1939 Amateur World Series is located in Cuba

== Tournament summary ==
The ceremonial first pitch was thrown out by Colonel Jaime Mariné, the director of the Cuban sports ministry and a close associate of Fulgencio Batista, who had helped organize the tournament. The United States was badly outmatched against the Cuban and Nicaraguan pitching staffs — which, unlike the amateur leagues in the U.S., included some of the best pitchers from their countries.

In a report on the 1939 series, Mann concluded that the United States "has the youngsters with the ability to compete with the other countries around the world but it is going to take enthusiastic cooperation on part of those amateur players... The U.S.A. should lead in baseball but first they will have to prove it to England, Japan, and Central America which at this time hold upper berths on this challenge."

== Results ==
Pos	Team	Pld	W	L	RF	RA	RD	PCT	GB
1	Cuba (H)	6	6	0	28	11	+17	1.000	—
2	Nicaragua	6	3	3	14	10	+4	.500	3
3	United States	6	0	6	9	30	−21	.000	6

Source: Baseball.ch (archived)
(H) Hosts

August 12, 1939	Nicaragua	3–4 (F/10)	Cuba	Gran Stadium La Tropical
August 12, 1939	LP: José "Chino" Meléndez	Boxscore	WP: Pedro "Natilla" Jiménez	Gran Stadium La Tropical

August 13, 1939	United States	3–13	Cuba	Gran Stadium La Tropical
August 13, 1939	LP: J. B. Williams	Boxscore	WP: Conrado Marrero	Gran Stadium La Tropical

August 15, 1939	United States	0–3	Nicaragua	Gran Stadium La Tropical
August 15, 1939	LP: Fred Webb	Boxscore	WP: Alfredo “Chiquirín” García	Gran Stadium La Tropical

August 17, 1939	Nicaragua	2–3 (F/10)	Cuba	Gran Stadium La Tropical
August 17, 1939	LP: Alfredo “Chiquirín” García	Boxscore	WP: Wenceslao Gonzáles	Gran Stadium La Tropical

August 19, 1939	Cuba	8–3	United States	Gran Stadium La Tropical
August 19, 1939	WP: Eliécer Álvarez	Boxscore	LP: Walter Erickson	Gran Stadium La Tropical

August 20, 1939	Nicaragua	7–3	United States	Gran Stadium La Tropical
August 20, 1939	WP: Alfredo “Chiquirín” García	Boxscore	LP: J.B. Williams	Gran Stadium La Tropical

August 24, 1939	Cuba	9–1	Nicaragua	Gran Stadium La Tropical
August 24, 1939	WP: Pedro "Natilla" Jiménez	Boxscore	LP: José "Chino" Meléndez	Gran Stadium La Tropical
August 24, 1939		Boxscore	HR: Stanley Cayasso	Gran Stadium La Tropical

August 24, 1939	Cuba	12–7	United States	Gran Stadium La Tropical
August 24, 1939	WP: Wenceslao Gonzáles	Boxscore	LP: Fred Webb	Gran Stadium La Tropical

August 24, 1939	Nicaragua	7–2	United States	Gran Stadium La Tropical
August 24, 1939	WP: Alfredo “Chiquirín” García	Boxscore	LP: Robert Davis	Gran Stadium La Tropical
August 24, 1939	HR: Jonathan Robinson	Boxscore		Gran Stadium La Tropical

== Rosters ==
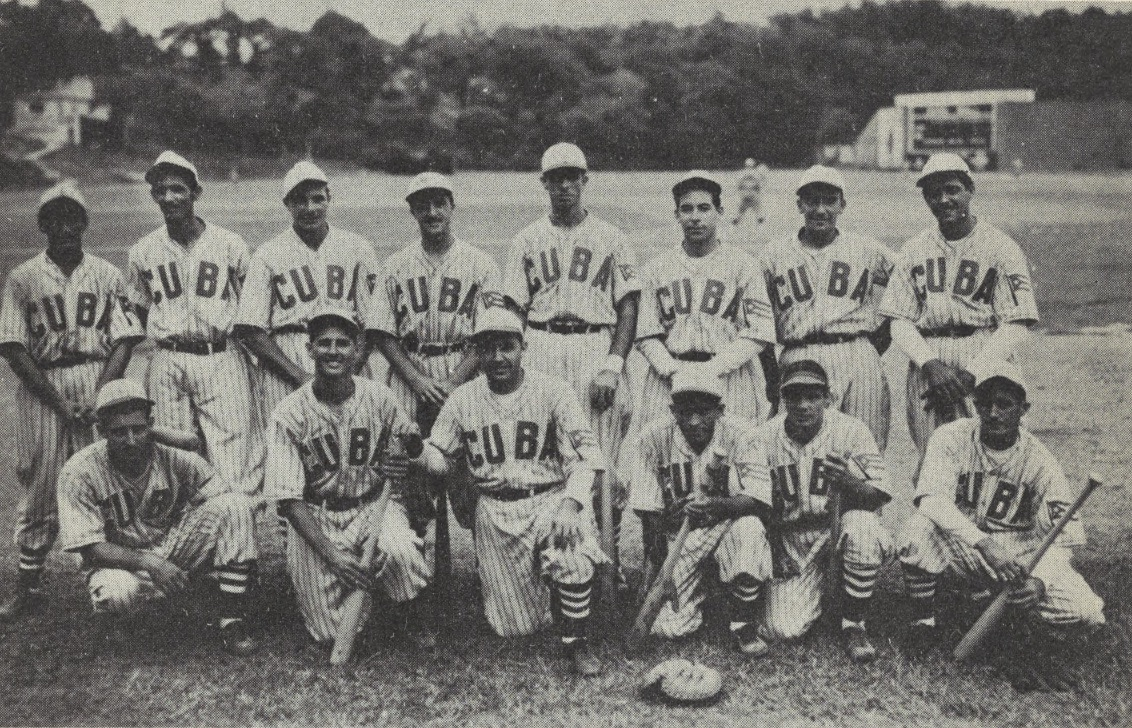
Cuba won its first world championship in 1939

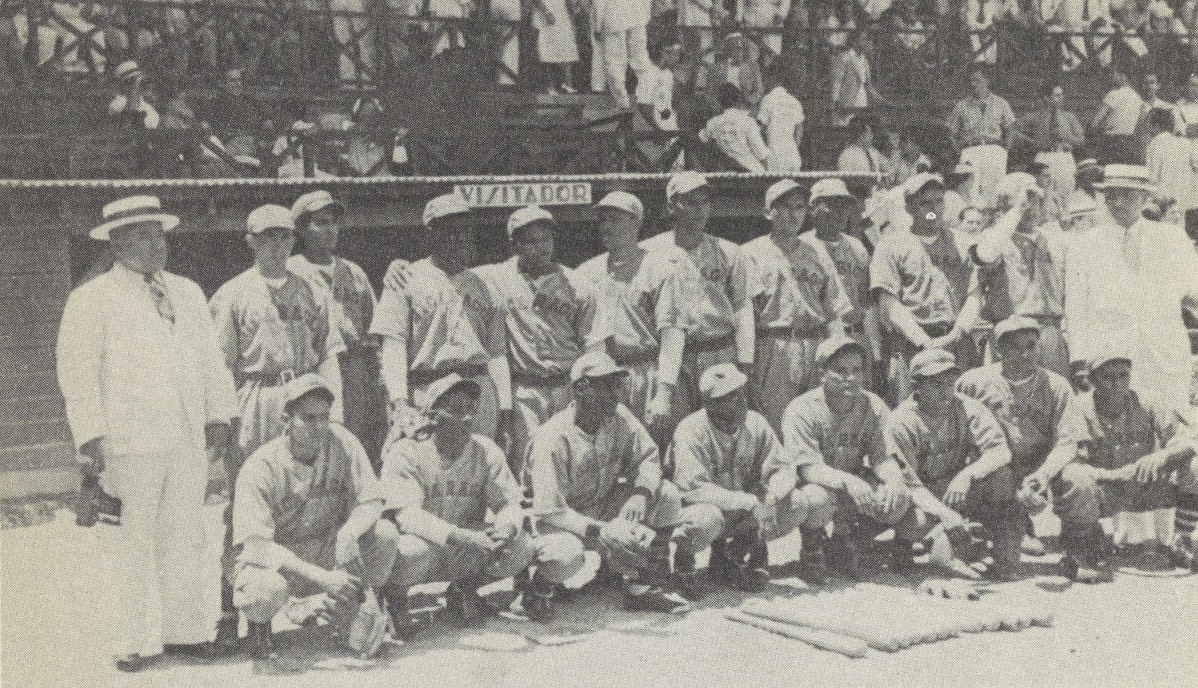
The Nicaragua national team

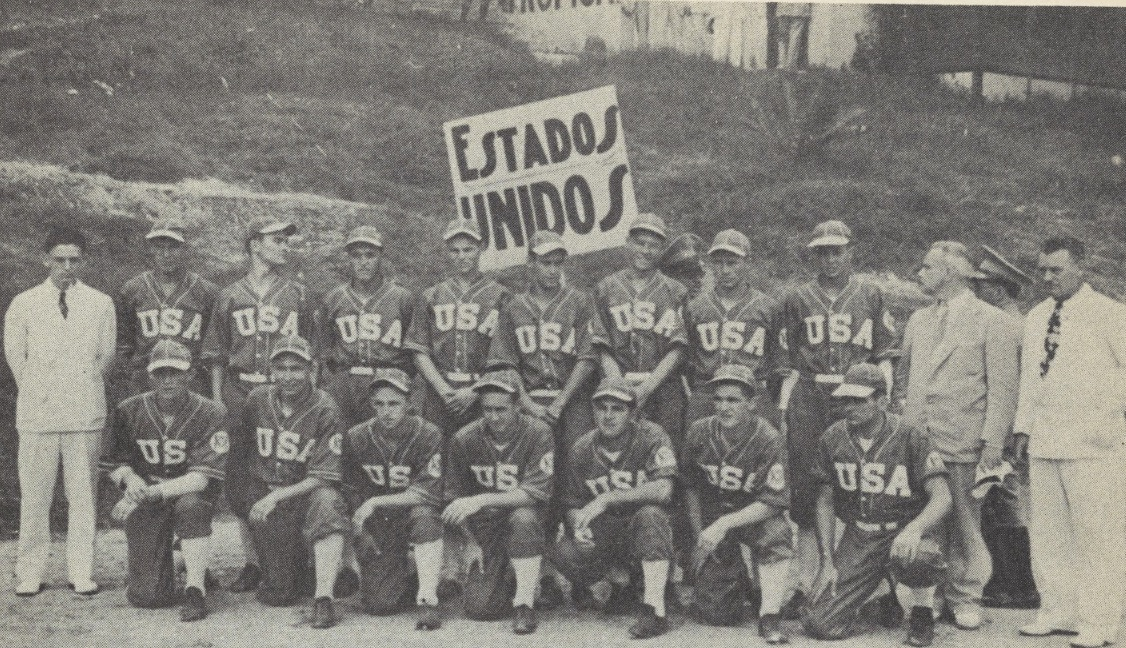
The U.S. national team

The Cuban team of 1939 was assembled on a somewhat "arbitrary" basis, according to Roberto González Echevarría. There were no professional players from the Cuban League, in keeping with the tournament's amateur basis (though Adolfo Luque, manager of Almendares and formerly of the Cincinnati Reds, acted as an English-language interpreter). Instead, the team was made up of the top players from Cuba's amateur circuits, including the clubs of Regla, Fortuna, Circulo Militar, Cienfuegos, and Deportivo Cardenas. Notably, the Cuban team included two Black Cuban players, Clemente Gonzalez and Esteban Maciques, as part of Mariné's efforts to desegregate the amateur leagues.

Conrado Marrero, a future Washington Senators pitcher, was on the Cuban squad, as was future New York Giants farmhand Andrés Fleitas (C). Bernardo Cuervo (1B) hit .200, leading the tournament with two triples and six runs batted in, while Ernesto Estevez (2B) hit .389 with two doubles. Wenceslao Gonzales (P), a future cup of coffee player with the Washington Senators, hit .500 (3 for 6). Pedro "Natilla" Jiménez was the best pitcher in the tournament with a 2–0 record and a 0.95 earned run average. Esteban Maciques (RF) hit .250 with 7 runs (led tournament). Cocoliso Torres (CF) won the most valuable player award for the tournament despite a .174 batting average. Gerardo Toyo (LF) hit .333 (9 for 27), tied for lead in hits.

Nicaragua's Stanley Cayasso (1B) hit one of only two home runs of the tournament plus two doubles to start a string of successful appearances in the tournament. Jonathan Robinson (RF) hit the other home run of the tournament, while Colbert Newell (LF) stole four bases to lead the tournament in that category

Charles Forbes led the team in offensive performance with a .300 avera, going 6 for 20 with 3 walks and 3 runs. American second baseman Joe Justice would go on to become head baseball coach at Rollins College, leading them to the 1954 College World Series, while left fielder Tom Callahan would later play basketball for the Providence Steamrollers of the BAA

== Final standings ==
Pos.	Team	W	L
1st place, gold medalist(s)	Cuba	6	0
2nd place, silver medalist(s)	Nicaragua	3	3
3rd place, bronze medalist(s)	United States	0	6

== Honors and awards ==
=== Statistical leaders ===
Batting leaders
Statistic	Name	Total
Batting average	(Nicaragua) Sam Garth	.500
Hits	(Nicaragua) Sam Garth (Cuba) Gerardo Toyo	9
Runs	(Cuba) Esteban Maciques	6
Home runs	(Nicaragua) Stanley Cayasso (Nicaragua) Jonathan Robinson	9
Runs batted in	(Cuba) Bernardo Cuervo	6
Stolen bases	(Nicaragua) Colbert Newell	4

Pitching leaders
Statistic	Name	Total
Wins	(Nicaragua) Alfredo García	3
Earned run average	(Cuba) Natilla Jiménez	0.95
Strikeouts	(Nicaragua) Alfredo García	21
Innings pitched	(Nicaragua) Alfredo García	31.2
Walks	(Nicaragua) José Meléndez	13

=== Awards ===
Award	Player	Ref.
Most Valuable Player	(Cuba) Cocoliso Torres	

== Bibliography ==
- Bjarkman, Peter. A History of Cuban Baseball
