= Baseball at the 1935 Central American and Caribbean Games =

Baseball was contested at the 1935 Central American and Caribbean Games in San Salvador, El Salvador.

Gold	Silver		Bronze
Cuba; Narciso Picazo; Félix Fernández; Carlos Fleites; José García; Emilio García; Féliz López; Miguel López; Esteban Maciques; Angel Nieto; Antonio Palencia; Jorge Santa Cruz; Francisco Hernández; Rafael Suárez; Adrián Zabala; Manuel Fortes; Ricardo Morales Manager: León Rojas	Panama; Ramón Ruiz; J. Rodríguez; Osvaldo Applewhite; T. Pescod; P. Caparrosa; Alfredo Tapia; Carlos Alvarez; Joseph Lyons; José Pinzón; Roberto Lucas; Eduardo Lanuza; J. Karamanitis; Eduardo Señales; Ulises Mahoney; P. Evans; José Antadilla	Nicaragua; Herbert Carter; Stanley Cayasso; Jorge Cayasso; Hernán Hernández; Bernardino Loaisiga; Cubert Newell; Carlos Navas; Julio Sandoval; Juan Manuel Vallecillo; John Williams; Horacio Solís; Manuel Miranda Manager: Ramón Méndez	none
