= Connie Marrero =

Cuban baseball player (1911–2014)

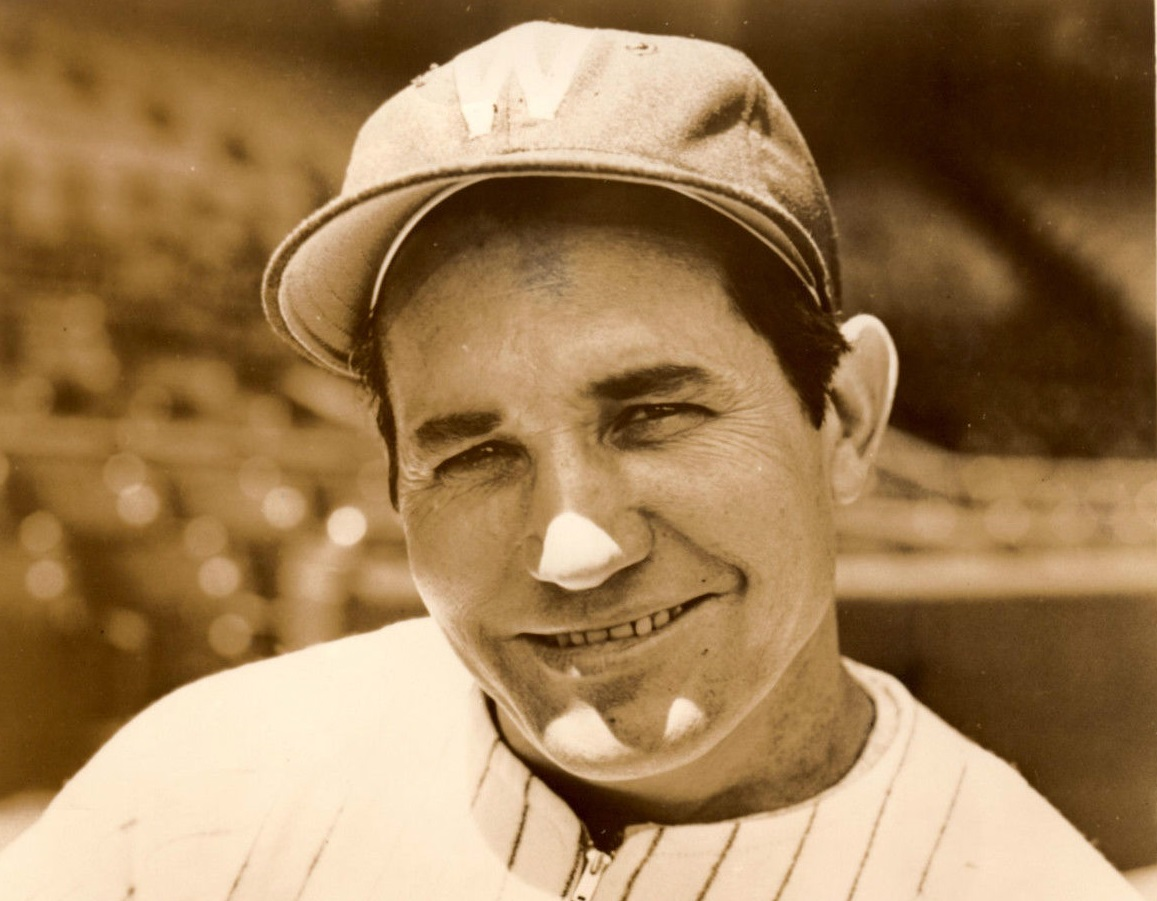
- Marrero in the 1950s
- Pitcher
- Born: April 25, 1911; Sagua la Grande, Cuba
- Died: April 23, 2014 (aged 102); Havana, Cuba
- Batted: Right Threw: Right

MLB debut
- April 21, 1950, for the Washington Senators

Last MLB appearance
- September 7, 1954, for the Washington Senators

MLB statistics
- Win–loss record: 39–40
- Earned run average: 3.67
- Strikeouts: 297
- Stats at Baseball Reference

Teams
- Washington Senators (1950–1954)

Career highlights and awards
- All-Star (1951); Amateur World Series MVP (1940)

Member of the Cuban

Baseball Hall of Fame
- Induction: 2014
Medals
Representing Cuba
Men's baseball
Baseball World Cup
Gold medal – first place	1939 Havana	Team
Gold medal – first place	1940 Havana	Team
Gold medal – first place	1942 Havana	Team
Silver medal – second place	1941 Havana	Team
Bronze medal – third place	1944 Caracas	Team

Conrado Eugenio Marrero Ramos (April 25, 1911 – April 23, 2014), nicknamed "Connie", was a Cuban professional baseball pitcher. The right-handed Marrero pitched in Major League Baseball from 1950 to 1954 for the Washington Senators.

Marrero was a popular star in his native Cuba, where he had a long and successful career in the Cuban Amateur League. He pitched for Cuba in several Amateur World Series competitions, including the legendary championship game of the 1941 Amateur World Series, and played several excellent seasons with the professional Cuban League and the minor league Havana Cubans. Marrero made his major league debut when he was 38 years old, and was one of the oldest players in the league throughout the duration of his time in the major leagues.

Marrero's pitches were primarily "slow stuff—curves, sliders and knucklers." Roberto González Echevarría provides the following description: "A bit plump, of less than average height [he was listed as 5 feet 5 inches (1.65 m) tall and 158 pounds (72 kg)], with short arms and small hands, Marrero looked, in uniform, like someone in a baseball costume, not a player. He looked more like a Spanish grocer or peasant than an athlete." His nicknames in Cuba were "El Guajiro de Laberinto" (The Peasant from Laberinto), reflecting his rural origins, "El Premier", and "El Curvo."

At age 102, Marrero was the oldest living former Major League Baseball player at the time of his death.

== Cuban career ==
=== Amateur play ===
Marrero was born on a farm called El Laberinto in the district of Sagua la Grande, Cuba; he was of Canarian descent. He played for various teams in his rural region, then in 1938 at age 27, he was invited to pitch for the Cienfuegos team of the Cuban Amateur League. The league played on Sundays from March through September. The team was sponsored by a department store, which employed him during the week. Marrero was one of the most popular and successful pitchers in Cuban Amateur League history, winning 123 games from 1938 to 1945. According to González Echevarría, Marrero as an amateur was considered a bigger drawing card than any professional pitcher in Cuba.

From 1939 to 1943, Cuba hosted the second through sixth Amateur World Series competitions at La Tropical Stadium in Havana. Marrero was a pitcher for the Cuba national baseball team at the second Amateur World Series in 1939, the first in which Cuba competed. Only three teams competed and Cuba easily won, with Marrero contributing a victory in the only game he pitched. In the third Amateur World Series in 1940, Marrero led the Cuba team to victory, going 3–2 with a 1.15 earned run average (ERA), and was named the most valuable player of the series. In the fourth Amateur World Series in 1941, Marrero won three games, but the series ended in a tie between Cuba and the Venezuela team. Venezuela was relying on the pitching of Daniel Canónico, who went 4–0 with an ERA of 1.69 in 32 innings. Cuba challenged Venezuela to a playoff game, which was scheduled to allow Canónico time to rest. On October 23, 1941 Marrero faced Canónico for the championship. Venezuela, helped by an error by the Cuba third baseman, scored 3 runs in the bottom of the first inning; Marrero was pulled after 2 innings, and Canónico held the Cuba scoreless until the ninth inning. Venezuela held on to win the game 3–1, winning their first Amateur World Series.

In 1942, Marrero had his best amateur season, going 22–5 with a 1.22 ERA. For the fifth Amateur World Series, the Cuba national team was selected by a fan poll, and Marrero was the top vote-getter. The series featured a rematch between Marrero and Venezuela's Canónico. This time the Cuba won 8–0, and Cuba regained the Cup. In 1943 Marrero was suspended from the Amateur League for six months for accepting payment for a game and consequently was not selected for the Amateur World Series team. In 1944 he returned with a 21–8 season and was again selected for the Amateur World Series team. The series was played in Caracas, Venezuela and ended in controversy. There was a three-way tie among Mexico, Venezuela, and Cuba, forcing a playoff. However, after some questionable calls by the umpires, who were provided by Venezuela, Cuba withdrew from the tournament in protest. In 1945. Marrero again pitched for Cienfuegos in the Amateur League. He was caught pitching in a non-league game a second time and given an indefinite suspension. He then decided to turn professional.

=== Cuban League ===
In the winter of 1946–47, Marrero signed with the Oriente team of the National Federation League. Marrero had a good season, leading the league in victories with an 8–5 record. After the end of the Federation season, he switched to the Almendares team of the regular Cuban League for the last month of the season. Although he played only a minor role—pitching in four games and going 1–0—he participated on the winning team of one of the most famous pennant races in Cuban League history.

In the spring of 1947, Marrero, as part of a Cuba all-star team, had a chance to pitch against major league teams that were playing in Havana during spring training. He beat the New York Yankees in a rain-shortened 7-inning game, allowing one run and four hits. A week later (now pitching for the minor league Havana Cubans), he suffered a tough 1–0 loss against the Brooklyn Dodgers, allowing four hits and striking out eight. The next Cuban League season, 1947/48, Marrero returned to Almendares in the Cuban League (which was now officially sanctioned by Major League Baseball) and pitched perhaps his best season, going 12–2, setting the Cuban League all-time records for shutouts (eight) and ERA (1.12) and winning the most valuable player award. However, with Almendares tied with the Habana team with one game left, he was unable to clinch the pennant as he lost to Habana's Alex Patterson in a 3–2 game.

In 1948/49. Marrero went 6–4, as Almendares easily won another pennant. As the league champions, Almendares represented Cuba in the first Caribbean Series played in Havana in 1949. Cuba swept the series with Marrero contributing a one-run, four-hit, complete-game victory in the only game he pitched. In 1949/50 Marrero went 7–3 and led the Cuban League with an ERA of 2.66, as Almendares again won the pennant. At the second Caribbean Series, Marrero went 0–2 as Cuba was upset by Panamá. The next winter Marrero went 11–7 with a 2.37 ERA, leading the Cuban League in wins and innings pitched. Almendares, however, was edged out by Habana for the pennant in a one-game playoff. In 1951/52 Marrero went 6–9, and the next winter he went 8–8.

In 1953/54, Marrero went 7–5 and helped Almendares regain the pennant. In the sixth Caribbean Series Marrero pitched a shutout in his only appearance, but Puerto Rico won the series. In 1954/55 Marrero went 2–3 and began to be used primarily in relief. Almendares won the pennant and went to the Caribbean Series, but Marrero did not make an appearance. In 1955/56 Marrero became the manager of Almendares, but the team fell to last place, making his tenure as manager a short one. He pitched in four games and went 1–0. After being released by Almendares, Marrero signed with the Tigres de Marianao for the 1956–1957 season, where he pitched 19 innings in seven games with a 1.37 ERA. Marianao won the pennant and Marrero pitched in his last Caribbean Series, lasting 3 1/3 innings against Panamá in a game that was eventually won by his teammate, Jim Bunning. Cuba went on to win their fourth victory in nine series. The next season was Marrero's last, as he pitched only four innings in three appearances.

Marrero's career Cuban League record was 69–43. His .600 winning percentage is the sixth highest in league history among pitchers with at least 40 wins. (Of the five pitchers with a higher career winning percentage, three are in the U.S. Baseball Hall of Fame—José Méndez, Ray Brown and Martín Dihigo; the other two are Carlos Royer and Camilo Pascual.) Despite not pitching in the Cuban League until he was 35 years old, his 69 victories ranks 10th on the Cuban League all-time list.

=== Minor league baseball ===
From 1947 to 1949, Marrero pitched for the Havana Cubans in the Florida International League. The team was a minor league affiliate of the Washington Senators. In 1947 Marrero went 25–6 and led the league in wins (25), complete games (28), strikeouts (251), shutouts (seven) and ERA (1.66). On July 12, 1947, Marrero pitched a no hitter against the Tampa Smokers, allowing only one base runner on a hit by pitch. The Cubans finished in first place with a 105–45 record. The Cubans also won the playoffs against the Miami Sun Sox and the Tampa Smokers, with Marrero pitching two shutouts.

In 1948, Marrero went 20–11 with a 1.67 ERA. The Cubans again finished in first place with a 97–57 record, their third consecutive title. In the playoffs they beat both the Lakeland Pilots and the Tampa Smokers. In 1949 Marrero won the league MVP award after going 25–8 with 11 shutouts and a 1.53 ERA. He set a league record by pitching 44 consecutive scoreless innings. Havana again finished in first place with a 95–57 record (the fourth of their five consecutive first-place finishes) and beat Miami Beach in the first round of the playoffs. In the second round, however, the Cubans were swept by Tampa, with Marrero losing to Tampa's Oscar del Calvo.

After five years with the major league Washington Senators, Marrero returned to Havana to play with the minor league team from 1955 to 1957. In 1954, the team had moved to the International League and had been renamed the Havana Sugar Kings. Marrero did not travel with the team, pitching only for their home games. In 1955 he went 7–3, pitched five shutouts (one of them a one-hitter), and had a 2.69 ERA. In 1956, the 45-year-old pitcher pitched only 45 innings and went 3–1. His only loss was to an even older pitcher, Miami's Satchel Paige. In 1957, Marrero pitched only five innings in three games, as his pitching career came to an end.

== Major League career ==
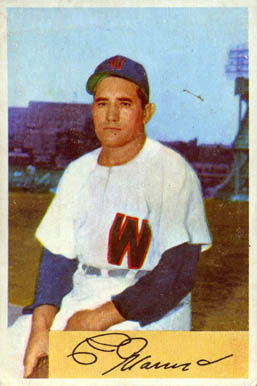
Marrero's 1954 Bowman Gum baseball card

From 1950 to 1954, Marrero pitched for the American League Washington Senators. During that period, Washington's roster also included a number of other Cuban players, such as pitchers Sandy Consuegra and Camilo Pascual and catcher Mike Guerra. The Senators were a second division team, never finishing higher than fifth place in the eight-team league while Marrero pitched for them. His first major league appearance came on April 21, 1950. In 1950 he pitched 152 innings in 27 games (19 of them starts), and finished with a 6–10 record and a 4.50 ERA.

In 1951, Marrero led his team in wins and innings pitched, going 11–9 in 187 innings with a 3.90 ERA. On April 26, 1951, he pitched a one-hitter against the Philadelphia Athletics, beating them 2–1. The only hit given up by Marrero was a home run by Barney McCosky.

In 1952, he went 11–8 with a 2.88 ERA (ninth in the league), as Washington improved to a 78–76 record. The following year he went 8–7 with a 3.03 ERA. In 1954 he was the oldest player in the major leagues, as he slipped to 3–6 with a 4.75 ERA. On January 24, 1955, the 43-year-old Marrero was released by the Senators.

Marrero finished his major league career with a 39–40 record and a 3.67 ERA, which was eight percent better than the league average (after adjusting for ballpark differences). He pitched 51 complete games, including seven shutouts, in his 94 starts. He was selected to the 1951 American League All-Star team, though he didn't play; at age 40, he was the oldest first-time All-Star to that point.

== Post-playing career ==
After retiring as a player, Marrero became a coach for the Havana Sugar Kings. He was listed as a scout in 1960 by the Boston Red Sox during Bucky Harris's term as Boston's general manager.

After the Cuban Revolution, Marrero was one of the most prominent players to remain in Cuba under Fidel Castro, thereby providing a link between the old professional Cuban League and the new amateur Cuban national baseball league and its Cuban National Series. He was a pitching coach for several years for the Havana Industriales and was also a roving pitching instructor. Marrero is a respected figure in Cuba; his portrait is shown on a mural at Estadio Latinoamericano, and he threw out the first pitch at the 1984 baseball World Championship. He also threw out the first pitch at the 1999 Baltimore Orioles–Cuba national baseball team exhibition series.

In 2006, Marrero was featured along with his Almendares teammate, Hall of Famer Monte Irvin, in a documentary about Cuba's baseball, "The Bases Are Loaded." He did not draw a major league pension and was reported to be living modestly in a room in a relative's Havana apartment. As recently as early 2007, a baseball tour of Cuba advertised that participants would have an opportunity to visit with the 95-year-old Marrero.

On April 25, 2013, Marrero celebrated his 102nd birthday with family and friends, "an unlit Cuban cigar in his mouth and a baseball cap on his head." Earlier in the year, he received a $20,000 payout from Major League Baseball, a payment granted to those who had played between 1947 and 1979, which had been held up due to issues surrounding the United States's embargo on Cuba. Marrero was a fan of the current Cienfuegos team. Marrero died on April 23, 2014, at his home in Havana just 2 days shy of his 103rd birthday.

== Career statistics ==
=== Cuban League ===
Year	Team	League	W	L	Pct	G	CG	IP	H	BB	SO	ERA
1946/47	Oriente	National Federation	8*	5	.615	18	—	—	—	—	—	—
	Almendares p	Cuban	1	0	1.000	4	1	14.3	—	5	6	—
1947/48	Almendares	Cuban	12*	2	.857*	22	17	184.7	123	55	99	1.12*
1948/49	Almendares c	Cuban	6	4	.600	15	4	77.7	71	19	27	3.48
1949/50	Almendares p	Cuban	7	3	.700	15	5	81.3	81	20	38	2.66*
1950/51	Almendares	Cuban	11*	7	.611	27	9	159.7*	135	32	58	2.37
1951/52	Almendares	Cuban	6	9	.400	21	6	115.7	107	40	51	3.50
1952/53	Almendares	Cuban	8	8	.500	22	8	135.0	105	47	48	2.60
1953/54	Almendares p	Cuban	7	5	.583	22	3	107.3	102	28	46	3.27
1954/55	Almendares p	Cuban	2	3	.400	21	1	58.7	42	19	28	2.61
1955/56	Almendares	Cuban	1	0	1.000	4	0	10.3	10	6	5	2.61
1956/57	Marianao c	Cuban	0	0	.000	7	0	19.7	13	6	7	1.37
1957/58	Marianao c	Cuban	0	0	.000	3	0	4.0	9	4	4	—
Total	12 seasons		69	46	.600	201	54^	968.3^	798^	281^	417^	2.51^
* – led league; p = pennant; c = pennant and Caribbean Series championship; ^ = totals incomplete.

Source: Figueredo, pp. 279, 284–286, 293–295, 309, 324, 339–342, 356, 370, 381, 396, 412, 423, 435.

==== Caribbean Series ====
Year	Team	W	L	Pct	G	CG	IP	H	BB	SO	ERA
1949	Almendares c	1	0	1.000	1	1	9.0	4	3	5	—
1950	Almendares	0	2	.000	2	0	7.0	9	0	3	—
1954	Almendares	1	0	1.000	1	1	9.0	5	2	5	0.00
1957	Marianao c	0	0	.000	1	0	3.3	5	0	0	—
Total	4 Series	2	2	.500	5	2	28.3	23	5	13	—
c = Caribbean Series championship.

Source: Figueredo, pp. 315, 333, 389, 428.

=== Minor leagues ===
Year	Team	League	W	L	Pct	G	CG	IP	H	BB	SO	ERA
1947	Havana c	Florida International	25*	6	.806	40	28*	271	180	46	251*	1.66*
1948	Havana c	Florida International	20	11	.645	35	24	264	206	24	168	1.67*
1949	Havana p	Florida International	25*	8	.758*	35	26*	258	175	47	167*	1.53
1955	Havana	International	7	3	.700	16	5	87	71	27	54	2.69
1956	Havana	International	3	1	.750	15	0	45	45	11	20	3.40
1957	Havana	International	0	0	.000	3	0	5	3	1	1	1.93
Total	6 seasons		80	29	.734	144	83	930	680	156	661	1.81
* – led league; p = pennant; c = pennant and playoff championship.

Source: Figueredo, pp. 291, 305–306, 320, 406, 420, 432.

=== Major League Baseball ===
Year	Team	League	W	L	Pct	G	CG	IP	H	BB	SO	ERA	ERA+
1950	Washington	AL	6	10	.375	27	8	152.0	159	55	63	4.50	100
1951	Washington	AL	11	9	.550	25	16	187.0	198	71	66	3.90	105
1952	Washington	AL	11	8	.579	22	16	184.3	175	53	77	2.88	124
1953	Washington	AL	8	7	.533	22	10	145.7	130	48	65	3.03	129
1954	Washington	AL	3	6	.333	22	1	66.3	74	22	26	4.75	75
Total	5 seasons		39	40	.494	118	51	735.3	736	249	297	3.67	108

- Career statistics from MLB · ESPN · Baseball Reference · Retrosheet · Baseball Almanac. Retrieved on March 16, 2007.

== See also ==
- List of centenarians (Major League Baseball players)
- List of centenarians (sportspeople)

== Notes and references ==
Records
Preceded by Tony Malinosky	Oldest recognized verified living baseball player February 8, 2011 – April 23, 2014	Succeeded by Mike Sandlock
