= Vedado Tennis Club =

Tennis club

Vedado Tennis Club Club de Tenis del Vedado
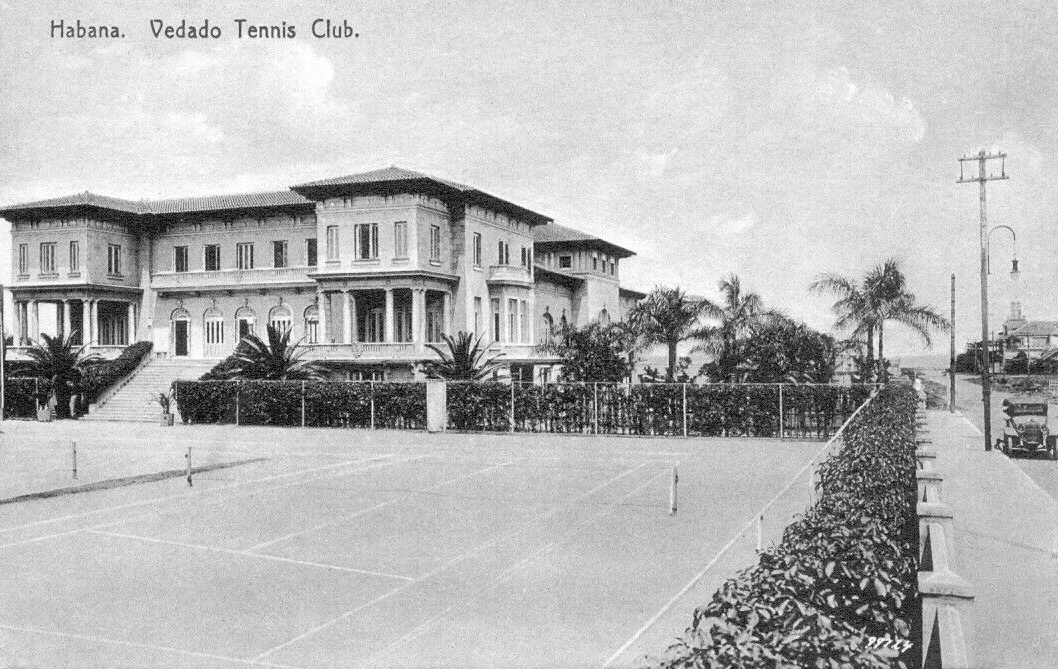
- Type: Tennis Club
- Founded: June 11, 1902
- Location: Havana, La Habana Province, Cuba
- Coordinates: 23°8′2″N 82°24′24″W

The Vedado Tennis Club was a prominent athletic and social club located in Havana, Cuba. After the Cuban Revolution, it was renamed the José Antonio Echeverría Workers' Social Club (Spanish: Club Social de Trabajadores José Antonio Echeverría).

Vedado Tennis Club fielded a baseball team in the Cuban Amateur League, winning seven pennants from 1914 to 1960.

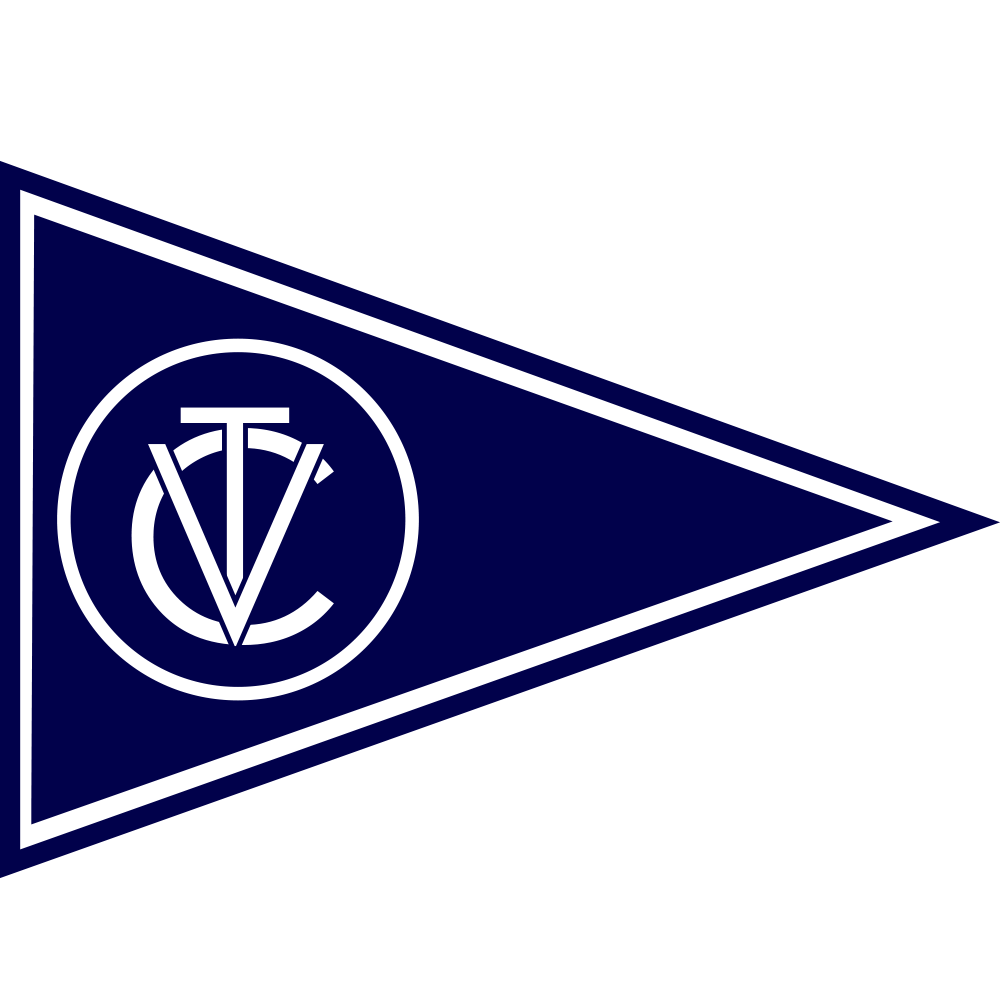
Vedado Tennis Club logo

== Early history ==
The Vedado Tennis Club was established in Vedado of Havana, Cuba on June 11, 1902.

Its founding members were José Agustín Ariosa, Antonio Suárez, Luis Rabell, Pedro Fantony, Julio Rabell, Alonso Franca, Gabriel García Echarte, Juan F. Morales, Miguel Franca, Edgardo Rabaell, Juan Arellano, Julio Blanco Herrera, Miguel Morales, Alberto Rabell, and Ramiro Cabrera. Porfirio Franca was an early promoter and president of the club, which he presided over for 15 years.

The Vedado Tennis Club and the University of Havana formed the Asociación Atlética, an amateur league, in 1905. The Vedado Tennis Club won multiple cups in tennis, polo, and crew, and won the championship in the first Amateur League season in 1905. The Vedado Tennis Club expanded into baseball, basketball, and football. By 1912, the club had five tennis courts, a basketball court, a polo field, a squash court, and a pool.
