= 1943 Amateur World Series =

Tournament details
- Country: Cuba
- Venue(s): 1 (in 1 host city)
- Dates: 25 September – 19 October
- Teams: 4
- Defending champions: Cuba

Final positions
- Champions: Cuba (4th title)
- Runners-up: Mexico
- Third place: Dominican Republic
- Fourth place: Panama

Tournament statistics
- Games played: 24

Awards
- MVP: (Cuba) Natilla Jiménez

The 1943 Amateur World Series was the sixth edition of the Amateur World Series (AWS), an international men's amateur baseball tournament. The tournament was sanctioned by the International Baseball Federation (which titled it the Baseball World Cup as of the 1988 tournament). The tournament took place, for the fifth consecutive time, in Cuba. It was contested by four national teams playing twelve games each from September 25 through October 19 in Havana. Cuba, who won its fourth overall, and second consecutive, AWS title.

== Participants ==
The number of participants in the series was significantly reduced from the previous editions, in part due to airline travel restrictions during World War II.

== Final standings ==
Pos.	Team	W	L
1	Cuba	9	3
2	Mexico	6	6
3	Dominican Republic	5	7
4	Panama	4	8
