= Luis Suárez (baseball) =

Cuban baseball player (1916–1991)

- Third baseman
- Born: August 24, 1916; Alto Songo, Cuba
- Died: June 5, 1991 (aged 74); La Habana, Cuba
- Batted: Right Threw: Right

MLB debut
- May 28, 1944, for the Washington Senators

Last MLB appearance
- May 28, 1944, for the Washington Senators

MLB statistics
- Games played: 1
- At bats: 2
- Hits: 0
- Stats at Baseball Reference

Teams
- Washington Senators (1944)

Luis Abelardo Suárez (August 24, 1916 – June 5, 1991) was a Cuban Major League Baseball third baseman who played for the Washington Senators in 1944.
