= 1940 Amateur World Series =

Tournament details
- Country: Cuba
- Venue: 1 (in 1 host city)
- Dates: 14 September – 6 October
- Teams: 7
- Defending champions: Cuba

Final positions
- Champions: Cuba (2nd title)

Tournament statistics
- Games played: 84

Awards
- MVP: (Cuba) Connie Marrero

The 1940 Amateur World Series was the third Amateur World Series (AWS), an international men's amateur baseball tournament. The tournament was sanctioned by the International Baseball Federation (which titled it the Baseball World Cup as of the 1988 tournament). The tournament took place, for the second consecutive time, in Cuba. It was contested by seven national teams playing twelve games each from September 14 through October 6 in Havana.

Cuba won its second, and second consecutive, Amateur World Series title. The runners-up were, also for the second consecutive year, Nicaragua and the United States; though the U.S. had finished in third place in 1939, the 1940 tournament saw a marked improvement as it tied with Nicaragua for the silver medal.

== Participants ==
Though only three of the fourteen teams that had been invited to the second Amateur World Series in Havana managed to attend the previous year, many of them participated in the 1940 edition, leading to a robust field of seven teams.

Mexico, Venezuela, and Puerto Rico all made their debuts at the Amateur World Series, as did Hawaii (which at the time was a U.S. territory), becoming the first team from Oceania to participate. However, all of those nations had previously participated in regional competitions; Mexico at the 1926 Central American and Caribbean Games, Venezuela and Puerto Rico at the 1938 Central American and Caribbean Games, and Hawaii at the tri-national tournament held in Paris during the 1937 World's Exhibition.

=== Invited teams ===
Caribbean (2)

- Cuba (hosts)
- Puerto Rico

Oceania (1)

- Hawaii

North America (3)

- United States
- Nicaragua
- Mexico

South America (1)

- Venezuela

== Venue ==
Havana, Cuba	1940 Amateur World Series is located in Cuba
Gran Stadium Cervecería Tropical	1940 Amateur World Series is located in Cuba
Capacity: 15,000	1940 Amateur World Series is located in Cuba

== Results ==
Pos	Team	Pld	W	L	RF	RA	RD	PCT	GB	CUB	NCA	USA	HWI	VEN	MEX	PUR	CUB	NCA	USA	HWI	VEN	MEX	PUR
1	Cuba (H)	12	10	2	84	31	+53	.833	—		8–5	1–2	3–1	11–1	6–0	10–4		4–5	3–2	6–5	7–1	6–2	19–3
2	Nicaragua	12	9	3	71	38	+33	.750	1	5–8		5–7	8–6	5–0	9–0	13–0	5–4		1–0	1–10	8–2	4–0	7–1
3	United States	12	9	3	51	20	+31	.750	1	2–1	7–5		2–0	4–0	3–2	4–2	2–3	0–1		3–2	0–3	9–1	15–0
4	Hawaii	12	5	7	51	49	+2	.417	5	1–3	6–8	0–2		6–3	3–8	7–4	5–6	10–1	2–3		1–5	7–4	3–2
5	Venezuela	12	5	7	33	53	−20	.417	5	1–11	0–5	0–4	3–6		6–1	3–1	1–7	2–8	3–0	5–1		6–5	3–4
6	Mexico	12	2	10	30	69	−39	.167	8	0–6	0–9	2–3	8–3	1–6		4–3	2–6	0–4	1–9	4–7	5–6		6–7
7	Puerto Rico	12	2	10	31	91	−60	.167	8	4–10	0–13	2–4	4–7	1–3	3–4		3–19	1–7	0–15	2–3	4–3	2–3	

Source: Baseball.ch (archived)
Legend: Blue = home team win; Red = away team win; Yellow = tie.
(H) Hosts

== Highlights ==
Some players of note who took part in the tournament include:

=== Cuba ===
- Connie Marrero (3-2, 1.15 ERA), winner of the tournament most valuable player award
- Pedro Orta (.282), father of journeyman Jorge Orta
- Nap Reyes (.297), future major league player
- Segundo Rodriguez (.433), team batting leader

=== Nicaragua ===
- Stanley Cayasso led the tournament in hits with 19
- Juan Manuel Vallecillo led the tournament in RBIs with 10, and tied for second with doubles 4
- José "Chino" Meléndez had a record of 3-0
- Jonathan Robinson (.444) led the tournament in batting average, as well as runs with 14

=== United States ===
- Stubby Overmire, future major league player

=== Hawaii ===
- Lawrence Kunihisha led the tournament with 7 stolen bases
- Herb North was a former professional who played with the Nagoya Golden Dolphins in the first Japanese Baseball League game in 1936

== Final standings ==
Pos.	Team	W	L
1st place, gold medalist(s)	Cuba	10	2
2nd place, silver medalist(s)	Nicaragua	9	3
2nd place, silver medalist(s)	United States	9	3
4	Venezuela	5	7
4	Hawaii	5	7
6	Mexico	2	10
7	Puerto Rico	2	10

== Honors and awards ==
=== Statistical leaders ===
Batting leaders
Statistic	Name	Total
Batting average	(Nicaragua) Jonathan Robinson	.444
Hits	(Nicaragua) Stanley Cayasso	19
Runs	(Nicaragua) Jonathan Robinson	14
Home runs	(Nicaragua) Jonathan Robinson	1
Runs batted in	(Nicaragua) Juan Manuel Vallecillo	10
Stolen bases	(Hawaii) Lawrence Kunihisha	7

Pitching leaders
Statistic	Name	Total
Wins	(Nicaragua) L. Sinclair	3
Earned run average	(Nicaragua) Jonathan Robinson	0.00
Strikeouts	(United States) Cliff McClanahan	29

=== Awards ===
Award	Player	Ref.
Most Valuable Player	(Cuba) Conrado Marrero	

=== All-Star team ===
Position	Player
C	(United States) Bill Krywicki (Cuba) Carlos Colás
1B	(Cuba) Virgilio Arteaga
2B	(United States) Joe McDonough
3B	(Hawaii) David K. Richards
SS	(Hawaii) Lawrence Kunihisa
OF	(Venezuela) Héctor Benítez
OF	(Cuba) Antonio Ruiz
OF	(Nicaragua) Jonathan Robinson
P	(United States) Stubby Overmire
P	(United States) Cliff McClanahan
P	(Cuba) Conrado Marrero
P	(Cuba) Tomás Hechevarría
P	(Nicaragua) José "Chino" Meléndez
P	(Hawaii) Al Nalua
