= Pedro Marrero Stadium =

Stadium in Havana, Cuba

Estadio Pedro Marrero
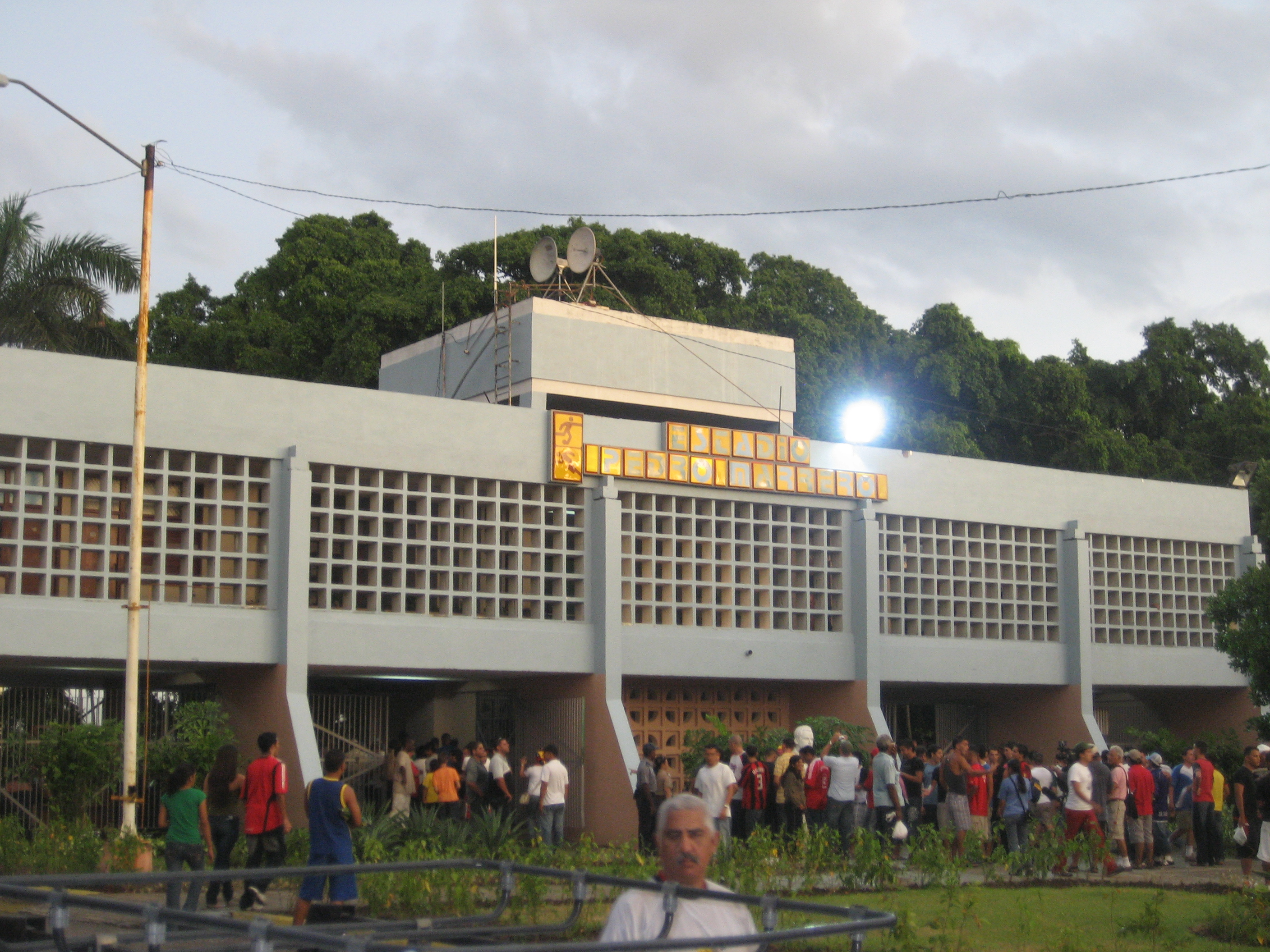
- Interactive map of Estadio Pedro Marrero
- Former names: Gran Estadio Cervecería Tropical
- Location: Havana, Cuba
- Coordinates: 23.107251°N 82.412918°W
- Owner: Asociación de Fútbol de Cuba
- Capacity: 30,000
- Surface: Grass
- Scoreboard: Manual (non-electric)

Construction
- Built: 1929
- Opened: 10 October 1930; 95 years ago

Tenant
- Cuba national football team

Pedro Marrero Stadium (Spanish: Estadio Pedro Marrero) is a multi-purpose stadium in Havana, Cuba. Built as a baseball stadium, it is now used primarily for football matches, and is the former home of CF Ciudad de La Habana. The stadium holds 30,000 and was built in 1929.

Originally named Gran Stadium Cervecería Tropical (or familiarly, La Tropical), it hosted the 1930 Central American and Caribbean Games, the 1937 Bacardi Bowl and many Cuban League baseball games. After the revolution, it was renamed for Pedro Marrero, a young man who died in the attack on the Moncada Barracks.

== History ==
During the golden age of Cuban baseball, La Tropical was the home of the Cuban League from the early 1930s to 1946. It also hosted major international events, including five Amateur World Series tournaments from 1939 to 1943. However, it was displaced as the temple of Cuban baseball after the construction of the nearby Estadio El Cerro (the modern Estadio Latinoamericano) in 1946.

After 1946, La Tropical hosted several upstart leagues that sought to challenge the monopoly that the Cuban League held on professional baseball on the island; the Cuban Federation League of 1946-47 (renamed the National League for 1947–48) was bankrolled by the stadium's owner, Julio Blanco Herrera.

== Geography ==
The stadium is located in the ward of Ceiba, part of the municipal borough of Playa; next to the borders with Nuevo Vedado, borough of Plaza de la Revolución.

== See also ==
- Estadio Panamericano
- Estadio Latinoamericano
