= Baseball at the 1938 Central American and Caribbean Games =

- Venue: Estadio Olímpico Nacional
- Dates: 11 — 23 February 1938
- Competitors: 123 from 7 nations
- Teams: 7

Medalists
| gold medal | Cuba |
| silver medal | Panama |
| bronze medal | Nicaragua |

Baseball was contested at the 1938 Central American and Caribbean Games in Panama City, Panama. All of the games were played at the Estadio Olímpico Nacional (the modern Estadio Juan Demóstenes Arosemena).

The tournament was played by seven national teams in a round robin format. Cuba finished first with a 5–1 record, winning the gold medal. Hosts Panama finished second with a 6–2 record, winning the silver medal; and Nicaragua finished third with a 5–3 record, winning the bronze medal.

== Participating nations ==
A total of seven countries participated. The number of athletes a nation entered is in parentheses beside the name of the country.

- Cuba (18)
- El Salvador (16)
- Mexico (17)
- Nicaragua (18)
- Panama (18)
- Puerto Rico (18)
- Venezuela (18)

== Venue ==
| Panama City, Panama | Baseball at the 1938 Central American and Caribbean Games is located in Panama |
| Estadio Olímpico Nacional | Baseball at the 1938 Central American and Caribbean Games is located in Panama |

== Medalists ==
| Event | Gold | Silver | Bronze |
|---|---|---|---|
| Men's baseball | Cuba; Enrique Aguirre; Juan José Decall; Mario Fajo; Carlos Fleites; Alberto Gómez; Natilla Jiménez; Agapito Mayor; Esteban Maciques; José Nápoles; Roberto Ortiz; Antonio Palencia; David Pérez; Segundo Rodríguez; Jorge Santacruz; Jorge Torres; Antonio Valdés; José Valdés; Remigio Vega | Panama; Carlos Álvarez; Osvaldo Applewhite; Vic Barnett; Simón Espinosa; Gil Garrido; Frank Hardley; Belfield Harris; Eduardo Jordán; Eduardo Lanuza; Roberto Lucas; José Lyons; Wilfred Lyons; Ulises Mahoney; Godwin Moore; Percy Parris; Roberto Pessoa; Eduardo Señales; Alfredo Tapia | Nicaragua; Allen Álvarez; Juan Emilio Álvarez; Herbert Carter; Jorge Cayasso; Stanley Cayasso; Alfredo García; Sam Garth; Carlos Lacayo; Rodolfo Marenco; José Ángel Meléndez; José Manuel Miranda; Carlos Navas; Cubert Newell; Alfonso Noguera; Jonathan Robinson; Julio Sandoval; Juan Manuel Vallecillo; Juan Williams |

== Group stage ==
The group stage featured a round robin format to determine the medal winners. Since Panama, Nicaragua and Puerto Rico tied in second place with a 4–2 record, a tie-breaker round between the three teams had to be played to define the second and third places.

| Pos | Team | Pld | W | L | RF | RA | RD | PCT | GB |
|---|---|---|---|---|---|---|---|---|---|
| 1 | Cuba | 6 | 5 | 1 | 26 | 14 | +12 | .833 | — |
| 2 | Panama (H) | 6 | 4 | 2 | 27 | 15 | +12 | .667 | 1 |
| 3 | Nicaragua | 6 | 4 | 2 | 19 | 20 | −1 | .667 | 1 |
| 4 | Puerto Rico | 6 | 4 | 2 | 21 | 13 | +8 | .667 | 1 |
| 5 | Mexico | 6 | 3 | 3 | 29 | 19 | +10 | .500 | 2 |
| 6 | Venezuela | 6 | 1 | 5 | 16 | 26 | −10 | .167 | 4 |
| 7 | El Salvador | 6 | 0 | 6 | 4 | 35 | −31 | .000 | 5 |

Source: Centro Caribe Sports
(H) Hosts

=== Results ===
| 11 February 1938; 9:17 (UTC–5) | Nicaragua | 5 – 4 | Mexico | Estadio Olímpico Nacional, Panama City |

| 11 February 1938; 13:30 (UTC–5) | Venezuela | 4 – 5 (F/12) | Cuba | Estadio Olímpico Nacional, Panama City |

| 11 February 1938; 16:15 (UTC–5) | El Salvador | 1 – 8 | Puerto Rico | Estadio Olímpico Nacional, Panama City |

| 12 February 1938; 10:00 (UTC–5) | Mexico | 9 – 0 | Venezuela | Estadio Olímpico Nacional, Panama City |

| 13 February 1938; 9:20 (UTC–5) | Panama | 6 – 0 | El Salvador | Estadio Olímpico Nacional, Panama City |

| 13 February 1938; 13:30 (UTC–5) | Mexico | 2 – 7 | Cuba | Estadio Olímpico Nacional, Panama City |

| 13 February 1938; 15:50 (UTC–5) | Venezuela | 3 – 6 | Nicaragua | Estadio Olímpico Nacional, Panama City |

| 15 February 1938; 9:30 (UTC–5) | Nicaragua | 3 – 1 (F/5) | Puerto Rico | Estadio Olímpico Nacional, Panama City |

| 15 February 1938; 13:30 (UTC–5) | Mexico | 6 – 2 | El Salvador | Estadio Olímpico Nacional, Panama City |

| 15 February 1938; 15:55 (UTC–5) | Panama | 2 – 6 | Cuba | Estadio Olímpico Nacional, Panama City |

| 16 February 1938; 11:00 (UTC–5) | Puerto Rico | 1 – 4 | Panama | Estadio Olímpico Nacional, Panama City |

| 17 February 1938; 9:50 (UTC–5) | Nicaragua | 5 – 1 | El Salvador | Estadio Olímpico Nacional, Panama City |

| 17 February 1938; 13:30 (UTC–5) | Panama | 4 – 2 | Venezuela | Estadio Olímpico Nacional, Panama City |

| 17 February 1938; 15:50 (UTC–5) | Mexico | 2 – 3 | Puerto Rico | Estadio Olímpico Nacional, Panama City |

| 19 February 1938; 9:30 (UTC–5) | Panama | 9 – 0 | Nicaragua | Estadio Olímpico Nacional, Panama City |

| 19 February 1938; 13:40 (UTC–5) | Puerto Rico | 6 – 2 | Cuba | Estadio Olímpico Nacional, Panama City |

| 19 February 1938; 15:30 (UTC–5) | Venezuela | 6 – 0 | El Salvador | Estadio Olímpico Nacional, Panama City |

| 20 February 1938; 11:00 (UTC–5) | Cuba | 2 – 0 | Nicaragua | Estadio Olímpico Nacional, Panama City |

| 20 February 1938; 11:00 (UTC–5) | Puerto Rico | 2 – 1 | Venezuela | Estadio Olímpico Nacional, Panama City |

| 21 February 1938; 13:50 (UTC–5) | Mexico | 6 – 2 | Panama | Estadio Olímpico Nacional, Panama City |

| 21 February 1938; 16:10 (UTC–5) | Cuba | 4 – 0 | El Salvador | Estadio Olímpico Nacional, Panama City |

== Tie-breaker ==
| Pos | Team | Pld | W | L | RF | RA | RD | PCT | GB |
|---|---|---|---|---|---|---|---|---|---|
| 1 | Panama (H) | 8 | 6 | 2 | 47 | 20 | +27 | .750 | — |
| 2 | Nicaragua | 8 | 5 | 3 | 25 | 28 | −3 | .625 | 1 |
| 3 | Puerto Rico | 8 | 4 | 4 | 24 | 29 | −5 | .500 | 2 |

Source: Centro Caribe Sports
(H) Hosts

=== Results ===
| 22 February 1938; 10:00 (UTC–5) | Nicaragua | 4 – 0 | Puerto Rico | Estadio Olímpico Nacional, Panama City |

| 22 February 1938; 14:00 (UTC–5) | Panama | 12 – 3 | Puerto Rico | Estadio Olímpico Nacional, Panama City |

| 23 February 1938; 13:30 (UTC–5) | Nicaragua | 2 – 8 | Panama | Estadio Olímpico Nacional, Panama City |

== Final standings ==
| Pos | Team | W | L |
|---|---|---|---|
| Gold medal | Cuba | 5 | 1 |
| Silver medal | Panama | 6 | 2 |
| Bronze medal | Nicaragua | 5 | 3 |
| 4 | Puerto Rico | 4 | 4 |
| 5 | Mexico | 3 | 3 |
| 6 | Venezuela | 1 | 5 |
| 7 | El Salvador | 0 | 6 |

== Statistical leaders ==
=== Batting ===
| Statistic | Name | Total |
|---|---|---|
| Batting average | (Panama) Vic Barnett (Note: Barnett was recognized as the tournament's "best batter." Four other players recorded higher averages, though none of them recorded more than six plate appearances (compared to Barnett's 17).) | .471 |
| Hits | (Panama) Carlos Álvarez (Nicaragua) Juan Emilio Álvarez | 10 |
| Runs | (Panama) Carlos Álvarez | 9 |
| Home runs | (Panama) Osvaldo Applewhite | 2 |
| Stolen bases | (Panama) Osvaldo Applewhite | 4 |

=== Pitching ===
| Statistic | Name | Total |
|---|---|---|
| Wins | (Cuba) Agapito Mayor | 4 |
| Losses | (Venezuela) Natividad Sanoja | 2 |
| Innings pitched | (Nicaragua) José Ángel Meléndez | 29.0 |
| Earned runs allowed | (Cuba) Agapito Mayor | 0.00 |
| Strikeouts | (Nicaragua) José Ángel Meléndez | 20 |

== All-tournament team ==
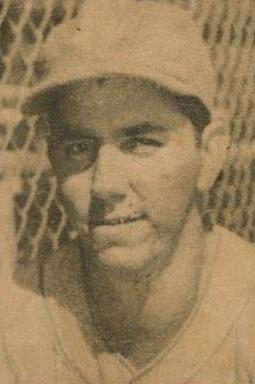
Agapito Mayor was named best pitcher of the tournament

| Position | Player |
|---|---|
| P | (Cuba) Agapito Mayor |
| C | (Venezuela) Gonzalo Flores |
| 1B | (Cuba) José Nápoles |
| 2B | (Panama) Godwin Moore |
| 3B | (Venezuela) Atilano Malpica |
| SS | (Cuba) Antonio Palencia |
| LF | (El Salvador) Julio Ponce (Venezuela) Carlos Velásquez |
| CF | (Venezuela) Héctor Benítez |
| RF | (El Salvador) Carlos Méndez |
