= Peter C. Bjarkman =

American historian, author, and commentator (1941–2018)

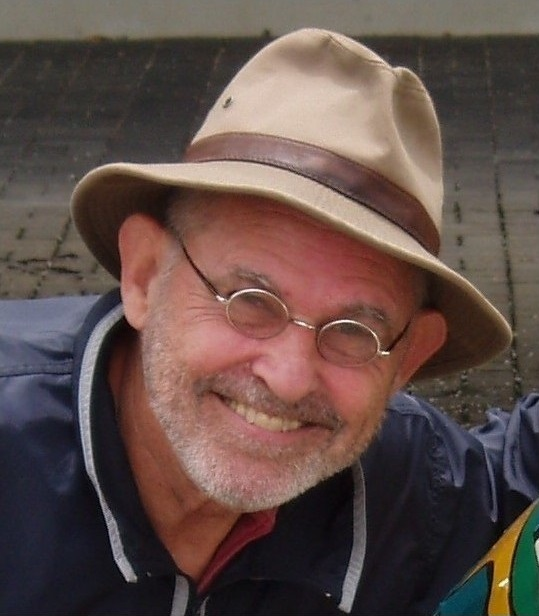
- Born: May 19, 1941; Hartford, Connecticut, U.S.
- Died: October 1, 2018 (aged 77); Havana, Cuba
- Education: University of Florida
- Occupations: author, sports historian
- Website: www.bjarkman.com

Peter C. Bjarkman (May 19, 1941 – October 1, 2018) was an American historian, freelance author, and commentator on the baseball played in Cuba after the 1959 Communist revolution. He provided regular internet commentary on Cuban League baseball as a contributing writer for LaVidaBaseball.com and as Senior Writer for the U.S.-based internet website BaseballdeCuba.com and appeared frequently on radio and television sports talk shows as an observer and analyst of the Cuban national sport. He also published more than three dozen books ranging in scope from Major League Baseball history and college and professional basketball history to sports biographies for young adult readers. In spring 2017 Bjarkman was honored with a SABR (Society for American Baseball Research) Henry Chadwick Award, the society's highest research recognition established in 2009, "to honor baseball's great researchers – historians, statisticians, annalists, and archivists – for their invaluable contributions to making baseball the game that links America's present with its past".

== Biography ==
Bjarkman was born and raised in Hartford, Connecticut, and graduated from the East Hartford Public School system in 1959. He attended the University of Hartford as an undergraduate, where he captained the varsity cross-country team and played freshman basketball and varsity baseball. He graduated in 1963 with a degree in English education, and later earned two master's degrees from the University of Hartford (Education, 1970) and Hartford's Trinity College (English, 1972), as well as a Ph.D. (1976) in linguistics from the University of Florida in Gainesville.

In the 1960s and early 1970s, Bjarkman served as a secondary school English teacher and track and field coach in Connecticut (Wethersfield High School), and also taught English at American bi-national schools in Bucaramanga, Colombia (1968–1969), and Guayaquil, Ecuador (1971–1972). After completing his doctorate, which included a specialization in Spanish linguistics, he pursued a university teaching career from 1976 to 1987 that included faculty positions at George Mason University (Fairfax, Virginia), Butler University (Indianapolis), Ball State University (Muncie, Indiana), the University of Colorado (Boulder), and Purdue University (West Lafayette, Indiana).

Since the early 1980s, Bjarkman resided in Lafayette, Indiana. His extensive travels during the past three decades involved numerous visits and extended stays in Eastern Europe (especially Croatia) and Cuba (more than three dozen visits since 1997), plus travels to Asia (Japan), Latin America (especially the Caribbean), and much of Western and Eastern Europe.

== Writing career ==
Beginning a freelance writing career in the late 1980s, Bjarkman authored more than twenty books on baseball and basketball history, including Major League Baseball team histories, young adult sports biographies, baseball and basketball coffee table picture books, and several ground-breaking academic histories of baseball played in Latin America and Cuba. Beginning in June 2007 he provided online essays and analysis of Cuban League games, plus regular online and print coverage of the Cuban national team during its numerous international baseball tournament appearances.

The acceptance of Bjarkman as an acknowledged authority on post-1962 Cuban baseball led to numerous electronic and print media appearances and interviews. Notable among these were several featured interviews on ESPN's "Outside the Lines" with Bob Ley; an appearance in the ESPN Films award-winning "30 for 30" documentary "Brothers in Exile"; the MLB Network 2016 documentary "Cuba: Island of Baseball"; and a central on-camera role in the Travel Channel's airing of Anthony Bourdain's "No Reservations Cuba" (first shown in July 2011). Bjarkman's extensive connections with Cuban baseball and his unique access to leading baseball figures on the Communist island nation were also highlighted in a November 2010 front-page feature story in The Wall Street Journal.

His final book, Cuba's Baseball Defectors: The Inside Story (Rowman and Littlefield, 2016), details the history of top Cuban league stars abandoning their homeland for the promise of riches in North American professional baseball, while also recounting Major League Baseball's alleged implicit sanctioning of human trafficking involving recent generations of Cuban baseball stars. That book received a SABR Award for 2016.

== Works ==
Bjarkman's works included:

Books

- Cuba's Baseball Defectors: The Inside Story. Rowman and Littlefield, 2016. ISBN 978-1-4422-4798-7.
- A History of Cuban Baseball, 1864–2006. McFarland & Company, 2006. ISBN 0-7864-2829-5. (Soft cover edition, Spring 2014, ISBN 978-0-7864-9382-1.)
- Diamonds around the Globe: The Encyclopedia of International Baseball. Greenwood, 2005. ISBN 0-313-32268-6.
- Smoke – The Romance and Lore of Cuban Baseball (with Mark Rucker). Total Sports Illustrated, 1999. ISBN 1-892129-07-8
- Baseball with a Latin Beat: A History of the Latin American Game. McFarland & Company, 1994. ISBN 0-89950-973-8.
- New York Mets Encyclopedia. Third Edition. Skyhorse Publishers, 2013. ISBN 978-1-61321-344-5
- The Baseball Scrapbook – The Men and Magic of America's National Pastime. Fifth Edition. World Publications, 2008. ISBN 0-88029-588-0
- Baseball & the Game of Life: Stories for the Thinking Fan (Editor). Vintage, 1991. ISBN 0-679-73141-5
- The Biographical History of Basketball. NTC Contemporary, 2000. ISBN 1-57028-134-3
- Hoopla: A Century of College Basketball. NTC Contemporary, 1998. ISBN 1-57028-216-1
- The History of the NBA. Crescent (Random House), 1992. ISBN 0-517-06949-0

Essays and Chapters

- "Bridge to Cuba's Baseball Past", The New York Times (August 14, 2011).
- "Sports: Baseball After 1959" in: Cuba: People, Culture and History. Charles Scribner's Sons, 2012 (Volume II, 917–920).
- "Baseball, Cuba" in: Sports around the World: History, Culture and Practice. ABC-CLIO Publishers, 2012 (Volume III, 57–60).
- "Introduction", The Bingo Long Traveling All-Stars & Motor Kings (a novel by William Brashler), University of Illinois Press, 1993, xvii-xxxiii.
- "College Basketball: The Formative Years" (Chapter 46) in: Total Basketball: The Ultimate Basketball Encyclopedia. Sports Classic Books, 2003, 663–669.
- "Fidel Castro and Baseball" in The SABR Baseball Biography Project
- "Sadaharu Oh" in The SABR Baseball Biography Project
- "Connie Marrero" in The SABR Baseball Biography Project

== Awards and recognition ==
- Bjarkman won a 2017 SABR (Society for American Baseball Research) Henry Chadwick Award for his career contributions to documenting Cuban baseball history and helping to shape understanding of the long, often difficult interaction between Latin American baseball and Major League Baseball.
- Bjarkman's Cuba's Baseball Defectors: The Inside Story won the Society for American Baseball Research Award for 2016.
- Bjarkman won the 2008 inaugural SABR Latino Committee Edward Valero Award (for "Best Article" of 2008 published in SABR's La Prensa del Béisbol Latino committee newsletter)
- Bjarkman's A History of Cuban Baseball, 1864–2006 won the 2007 Robert Peterson Recognition Award from SABR's Negro Leagues Committee for "advancing public awareness of Negro League baseball"
- Bjarkman's Diamond around the Globe: The Encyclopedia of International Baseball won the 2004 Sporting News-SABR Award for "Best Baseball Research" and was a finalist for the Spitball magazine CASEY Award for "Best Baseball Book of the Year"
- Bjarkman's Smoke—The Romance and Lore of Cuban Baseball (co-authored with Mark Rucker) was a Finalist for the Spitball magazine CASEY Award and the SABR Seymour Medal ("Best Baseball Book of the Year")
- Bjarkman's Baseball with a Latin Beat: A History of the Latin American Game was a 1994 winner of the Macmillan-SABR Baseball Research Award
- Bjarkman and Mark Rucker were honored in February 2002 by the Matanzas (Cuba) Sports Club with a special Reconocimiento al Mérito "Palmar de Junco" Monumental Nacional ("Palmar de Junco National Monument Special Recognition and Merit Award") in celebration of their contributions to Cuban baseball history with their book Smoke—The Romance and Lore of Cuban Baseball
