= Football at the 2003 All-Africa Games – Men's qualification =

The men's qualification for football tournament at the 2003 All-Africa Games.

== Qualification stage ==
=== Zone I (North Africa) ===
Morocco and Tunisia withdrew.

Team 1	Agg.	Team 2	1st leg	2nd leg
Libya	1–1 (a)	Algeria	1–1	0–0

25 January 2003

Libya	1–1	Algeria
Al Idrissi 68' (pen.)		Messaoud 62'

Misurata Stadium, Misurata
23 February 2003

Algeria	0–0	Libya

Salem Mabrouki Stadium, Rouiba

Algeria qualified.

=== Zone II (West Africa 1) ===
First round

Team 1	Agg.	Team 2	1st leg	2nd leg
Mali	w/o	Mauritania	—	—
Senegal	4–3	Guinea	1–1	3–2

22 September 2002

Senegal	1–1	Guinea
Bocandé 66'		Baryzakhno 67'

27 October 2002

Guinea	2–3	Senegal

Senegal advanced to the second round.

Second round

Team 1	Agg.	Team 2	1st leg	2nd leg
Senegal	2–1	Mali	1–1	1–0

25 January 2003

Senegal	1–1	Mali
Bocandé 63'		N'Diaye 73'

23 February 2003

Mali	0–1	Senegal
		Keïta 81'

Senegal qualified.

=== Zone III (West Africa 2) ===
First round

Team 1	Agg.	Team 2	1st leg	2nd leg
Liberia	w/o	Benin	—	—
Togo	w/o	Niger	—	—

Second round

Team 1	Agg.	Team 2	1st leg	2nd leg
Liberia	w/o	Ghana	—	—
Togo	w/o	Ivory Coast	—	—
Ghana	bye			
Ivory Coast	bye			

Third round

Team 1	Agg.	Team 2	1st leg	2nd leg
Ghana	w/o	Ivory Coast	—	—

Ghana qualified.

=== Zone IV (Central Africa) ===
First round

Team 1	Agg.	Team 2	1st leg	2nd leg
Rwanda	w/o	(Republic of the Congo) Congo	—	—
Cameroon (Ghana)	bye			

Second round

Team 1	Agg.	Team 2	1st leg	2nd leg
Cameroon	4–2	Rwanda	3–0	1–2

25 January 2003

Cameroon	3–0	Rwanda
Djoumet 30'; Bengondo 33'; Wansi 55' (pen.)

25 January 2003

Rwanda	2–1	Cameroon
Iraguha 22'; Marengera 34'		Bengondo 54'

Cameroon qualified.

=== Zone V (East Africa) ===
Tournament held in Egypt. Ethiopia, Sudan and Uganda withdrew after Egypt refused to honour their pledge to provide participating nations with return air tickets.

Team	Pld	W	D	L	GF	GA	GD	Pts
Egypt	2	1	1	0	2	1	+1	4
Kenya	2	0	1	1	1	2	−1	1
Ethiopia (W)	0	0	0	0	0	0	0	0
Sudan (W)	0	0	0	0	0	0	0	0
Uganda (W)	0	0	0	0	0	0	0	0

(W) Withdrew
23 December 2002

Egypt	0–0	Kenya

26 December 2002

Kenya	1–2	Egypt

Egypt qualified.

=== Zone VI (Southern Africa) ===
First round

Team 1	Agg.	Team 2	1st leg	2nd leg
Swaziland (Eswatini)	1–3	Namibia	1–1	0–2
Botswana	3–1	Lesotho	1–0	2–1

7 July 2002

Swaziland	1–1	Namibia

4 August 2002

Namibia	2–0	Swaziland

Namibia qualified to the second round.

6 July 2002

Botswana	1–0	Lesotho

4 August 2002

Lesotho	1–2	Botswana

Botswana qualified to the second round.

Second round

Team 1	Agg.	Team 2	1st leg	2nd leg
Zimbabwe	2–1	Mozambique	1–0	1–1
Zambia	3–2	Namibia	2–0	1–2
South Africa	4–4 (4–3 p)	Malawi	2–2	2–2
Angola	5–2	Botswana	4–1	1–1

3 November 2002

Zimbabwe	1–0	Mozambique

24 November 2002

Mozambique	1–1	Zimbabwe

Zimbabwe qualified to the third round.

22 September 2002

Zambia	2–0	Namibia
Mwandila 41'; Chalwe 67'

26 October 2002

Namibia	2–1	Zambia
Shimwino 7'; Louw 20'		Katongo 90'

Zambia qualified to the third round.

22 September 2002

South Africa	2–2	Malawi
Sibeko 70'; Mngomeni 80'		Mwafulirwa 62'; Ng'ambi 82'

26 October 2002

Malawi	2–2	South Africa
Penalties
	3–4

South Africa qualified to the third round.

22 September 2002

Angola	4–1	Botswana

25 October 2002

Botswana	1–1	Angola
Mohanbi 22'		Chinho 85'

Angola qualified to the third round.

Third round

Team 1	Agg.	Team 2	1st leg	2nd leg
Zimbabwe	2–2 (a)	Zambia	2–1	0–1
South Africa	4–2	Angola	2–0	2–2

26 January 2003

Zimbabwe	2–1	Zambia
Sengu 77'; Kapini 80' (pen.)		Mwandila 47'

22 February 2003

Zambia	1–0	Zimbabwe
Chalwe 1'

Zambia qualified.

25 January 2003

South Africa	2–0	Angola
Manyathela 83'; Khenyeza 90'

23 March 2003

Angola	2–2	South Africa
Mateus 31'; Gilberto 62' (pen.)		Manyathela 4', 90'

South Africa qualified.

=== Zone VII (Indian Ocean) ===
No matches, 2 teams qualify from Zone VI.

== Qualifying teams ==
The following 8 nations qualified for men's play at the 2003 All Africa Games. Two teams qualify from Zone VI replacing Zone VII.

Zone	Team
Hosts	Nigeria
Zone I	Algeria
Zone II	Senegal
Zone III	Ghana
Zone IV	Cameroon
Zone V	Egypt
Zone VI	South Africa
Zone VI	Zambia
Zone VII	no team
