= Football at the 2007 All-Africa Games – Men's qualification =

The men's qualification for football tournament at the 2007 All-Africa Games.

== Qualification stage ==
=== Zone 1 (North Africa) ===
Team 1	Agg.	Team 2	1st leg	2nd leg
Libya	2–3	Tunisia	0–1	2–2

29 December 2006
16:00

Libya	0–1	Tunisia

11 June Stadium, Tripoli
24 January 2007

Tunisia	2–2	Libya
Harbaoui 22'; Mouihbi 66' (pen.)		Al Ghennai 35'; Abdelkader 90'

El Menzah Stadium, Tunis

Tunisia qualified; in addition, Algeria qualify as hosts

=== Zone 2 (West Africa 1) ===
First round

Team 1	Agg.	Team 2	1st leg	2nd leg
Mali	0–1	Guinea	0–1	0–0
Senegal	w/o	Guinea-Bissau	—	—

17 December 2006

Mali	0–1	Guinea

14 January 2007

Guinea	0–0	Mali

Guinea advanced to the second round

Second round

Team 1	Agg.	Team 2	1st leg	2nd leg
Senegal	2–2 (4–2 p)	Guinea	1–1	1–1

1 April 2007

Senegal	1–1	Guinea

14 April 2007

Guinea	1–1	Senegal
Cissé 49'		Ndiour 90+5'
Penalties
	2–4

Senegal qualified.

=== Zone 3 (West Africa 2) ===
First round

Team 1	Agg.	Team 2	1st leg	2nd leg
Ghana	2–2 (4–3 p)	Ivory Coast	2–0	0–2
Nigeria	bye			

17 December 2006

Ghana	2–0	Ivory Coast

13 January 2007

Ivory Coast	2–0	Ghana
Penalties
	3–4

Ghana advanced to the second round.

Second round

Team 1	Agg.	Team 2	1st leg	2nd leg
Ghana	1–1 (a)	Nigeria	0–0	1–1

25 February 2007

Ghana	0–0	Nigeria

10 March 2007

Nigeria	1–1	Ghana

Ghana qualified.

=== Zone 4 (Central Africa) ===
First round

Team 1	Agg.	Team 2	1st leg	2nd leg
Central African Republic	w/o	Congo	—	—

Second round

Team 1	Agg.	Team 2	1st leg	2nd leg
Congo	w/o	Cameroon	0–6	—
Gabon	w/o	DR Congo	—	—

Third round

Team 1	Agg.	Team 2	1st leg	2nd leg
Gabon	2–5	Cameroon	2–0	0–5

25 February 2007

Gabon	2–0	Cameroon

10 March 2007

Cameroon	5–0	Gabon
Bekamenga 22'; Mboua 54'; Mandjeck 76'; Ghomsi 82'; Moukandjo 90+1'

Cameroon qualified.

=== Zone 5 (East Africa) ===
First round

Team 1	Agg.	Team 2	1st leg	2nd leg
Tanzania	1–2	Ethiopia	1–0	0–2
Egypt	bye			

17 December 2006

Tanzania	1–0	Ethiopia

14 January 2007

Ethiopia	2–0	Tanzania

Ethiopia advanced to the second round.

Second round

Team 1	Agg.	Team 2	1st leg	2nd leg
Ethiopia	2–4	Egypt	2–0	0–4

25 February 2007

Ethiopia	2–0	Egypt

11 March 2007

Egypt	4–0	Ethiopia

Egypt qualified.

=== Zone 6 (Southern Africa) ===
First round

Team 1	Agg.	Team 2	1st leg	2nd leg
Lesotho	w/o	Botswana	—	—

Second round

Team 1	Agg.	Team 2	1st leg	2nd leg
Zimbabwe	0–1	Mozambique	0–0	0–1
Botswana	2–2 (4–3 p)	Angola	2–0	0–2
South Africa	bye			
Zambia	bye			

24 February 2007

Zimbabwe	0–0	Mozambique

11 March 2007

Mozambique	1–0	Zimbabwe

Mozambique advanced to the third round.

24 February 2007

Botswana	2–0	Angola

11 March 2007

Angola	2–0	Botswana
Penalties
	3–4

Botswana advanced to the third round.

Third round

Team 1	Agg.	Team 2	1st leg	2nd leg
Mozambique	2–7	Zambia	0–4	2–3
South Africa	4–0	Botswana	2–0	2–0

31 March 2007

Mozambique	0–4	Zambia
		Singuluma 19'; Sunzu 23', 69'; Kalaba 50'

14 April 2007

Zambia	3–2	Mozambique
Kalaba 38'; Singuluma 62'; Sunzu 79'		Falange 17', 41'

Zambia qualified.

1 April 2007

South Africa	2–0	Botswana
Isaacs 31'; Mokoena 67'

Olën Park, Potchefstroom
Referee: Kenas Marange (Zimbabwe)
15 April 2007

Botswana	0–2	South Africa
		Mokoena 37'; Ntuli 78'

Botswana National Stadium, Gaborone

South Africa qualified.

=== Zone 7 (Indian Ocean) ===
No matches took place, two teams qualify from Zone 6.

== Qualified teams ==
The following eight teams qualified for the final tournament.

Zone	Team
Hosts	Algeria
Zone I	Tunisia
Zone II	Guinea
Zone III	Ghana
Zone IV	Cameroon
Zone V	Egypt
Zone VI	South Africa
Zone VI	Zambia
Zone VII	no team
