= Football at the 1996 Summer Olympics – Men's African Qualifiers =

1996 Summer Olympics – Men's Football African Qualifiers
- Dates: 15 January 1995 – 17 March 1996

The African Men's Olympic Qualifiers was held to determine the three African national teams for under 23 that would participate at the 1996 Summer Olympics football tournament held in Atlanta.

== Preliminary round ==
Team 1	Agg.	Team 2	1st leg	2nd leg
Burundi	w/o	Djibouti	—	—
Lesotho	1–3	Namibia	1–0	0–3
Burkina Faso	w/o	Guinea-Bissau	—	—

15 January 1995

Burundi	w/o	Djibouti

29 January 1995

Djibouti	w/o	Burundi

Burundi advance. Djibouti withdrew.

15 January 1995

Lesotho	1–0	Namibia

28 January 1995

Namibia	3–0	Lesotho

Namibia won 3–1 on aggregate.

15 January 1995

Burkina Faso	w/o	Guinea-Bissau

29 January 2015

Guinea-Bissau	w/o	Burkina Faso

Burkina Faso advance. Guinea Bissau withdrew.

== First round ==
=== Group 1 ===
Team 1	Agg.	Team 2	1st leg	2nd leg
Nigeria	3–0	Kenya	0–0	3–0
Zimbabwe	4–0	Malawi	4–0	0–0
Zambia	6–1	Botswana	2–0	4–1
Egypt	2–0	Mauritius	1–0	1–0

15 April 1995

Nigeria	0–0	Kenya

29 April 2015

Kenya	0–3	Nigeria

16 April 1995

Zimbabwe	4–0	Malawi

29 April 2015

Malawi	0–0	Zimbabwe

16 April 1995

Zambia	2–0	Botswana

30 April 2015

Botswana	1–4	Zambia

16 April 1995

Egypt	1–0	Mauritius
Mostafa

30 April 2015

Mauritius	0–1	Egypt
		Nabih

=== Group 2 ===
Team 1	Agg.	Team 2	1st leg	2nd leg
Algeria	1–3	Guinea	1–1	0–2
Mali	1–3	Togo	1–2	0–1
Morocco	0–1	Senegal	0–0	0–1
Tunisia	4–2	Burkina Faso	4–1	0–1

14 April 1995

Algeria	1–1	Guinea

30 April 1995

Guinea	2–0	Algeria

16 April 1995

Mali	1–2	Togo

30 April 1995

Togo	1–0	Mali

16 April 1995

Morocco	0–0	Senegal

29 April 1995

Senegal	1–0	Morocco

16 April 1995

Tunisia	4–1	Burkina Faso

30 April 1995

Burkina Faso	1–0	Tunisia

=== Group 3 ===
Team 1	Agg.	Team 2	1st leg	2nd leg
South Africa	2–5	Burundi	1–1	1–4
Cameroon	1–0	Namibia	0–0	1–0
Gabon	1–5	Angola	1–3	0–2
Ghana	w/o	Congo	0–0	—

15 April 1995

South Africa	1–1	Burundi

30 April 1995

Burundi	4–1	South Africa

16 April 1995

Cameroon	0–0	Namibia

29 April 1995

Namibia	0–1	Cameroon

16 April 1995

Gabon	1–3	Angola

30 April 1995

Angola	2–0	Gabon

16 April 1995

Ghana	0–0	Congo

30 April 1995

Congo	w/o	Ghana

== Second round ==
=== Group 1 ===
Team 1	Agg.	Team 2	1st leg	2nd leg
Nigeria	4–3	Egypt	3–2	1–1
Zimbabwe	3–2	Zambia	1–1	2–1

12 August 1995

Nigeria	3–2	Egypt
Kanu; Oliseh		Mostafa (pen.); Emam

25 August 1995

Egypt	1–1	Nigeria
Emam 13'		Ikpeba 90'

13 August 1995

Zimbabwe	1–1	Zambia

27 August 1995

Zambia	1–2	Zimbabwe

=== Group 2 ===
Team 1	Agg.	Team 2	1st leg	2nd leg
Senegal	2–5	Guinea	2–3	0–2
Tunisia	2–3^{1}	Togo	1–1	1–2

12 August 1995

Senegal	2–3	Guinea

26 August 1995

Guinea	2–0	Senegal

17 August 1995

Tunisia	1–1	Togo

27 August 1995

Togo	2–1	Tunisia

^1 Togo won 3–2 on aggregate, however it was later suspended because of age limit violation, Tunisia advanced to the third round.

=== Group 3 ===
Team 1	Agg.	Team 2	1st leg	2nd leg
Ghana	3–2	Angola	3–1	0–1
Cameroon	2–1	Burundi	2–0	0–1

13 August 1995

Ghana	3–1	Angola

27 August 1995

Angola	1–0	Ghana

27 August 1995

Cameroon	2–0	Burundi

13 August 1995

Burundi	1–0	Cameroon

== Third round ==
Team 1	Agg.	Team 2	1st leg	2nd leg
Tunisia	5–4	Guinea	5–2	0–2
Zimbabwe	0–2	Nigeria	0–1	0–1
Ghana	3–0	Cameroon	3–0	0–0

3 March 1996

Tunisia	5–2	Guinea

17 March 1996

Guinea	2–0	Tunisia

Tunisia won 5–4 on aggregate and qualified for the 1996 Summer Olympics.

3 March 1996

Zimbabwe	0–1	Nigeria

16 March 1996

Nigeria	1–0	Zimbabwe

Nigeria won 2–0 on aggregate and qualified for the 1996 Summer Olympics.

3 March 1996

Ghana	3–0	Cameroon

17 March 1996

Cameroon	0–0	Ghana

Ghana won 3–0 on aggregate and qualified for the 1996 Summer Olympics.
