= Football at the 1999 All-Africa Games – Men's qualification =

The men's qualification for football tournament at the 1999 All-Africa Games.

== Qualification stage ==
=== Zone I (North Africa) ===
Libya and Morocco withdrew.

| Team 1 | Agg. | Team 2 | 1st leg | 2nd leg |
|---|---|---|---|---|
| Algeria | w/o | Tunisia | — | — |

11 July 1999

| Algeria | Cancelled | Tunisia |

25 July 1999

| Tunisia | Cancelled | Algeria |

Algeria qualified.

=== Zone II (West Africa 1) ===
Tournament held in Bamako, Mali. Guinea withdrew.

| Team | Pld | W | D | L | GF | GA | GD | Pts |
|---|---|---|---|---|---|---|---|---|
| Mali | 2 | 2 | 0 | 0 | 8 | 2 | +6 | 6 |
| Senegal | 2 | 0 | 0 | 2 | 2 | 8 | −6 | 0 |
| Guinea (W) | 0 | 0 | 0 | 0 | 0 | 0 | 0 | 0 |

(W) Withdrew
11 July 1999

| Mali | 6–1 | Senegal |

Bamako

25 July 1999

| Senegal | 1–2 | Mali |

Bamako

Mali qualified.

=== Zone III (West Africa 2) ===
Tournament held in Ghana. Liberia withdrew.

| Team | Pld | W | D | L | GF | GA | GD | Pts |
|---|---|---|---|---|---|---|---|---|
| Ivory Coast | 3 | 1 | 2 | 0 | 3 | 1 | +2 | 5 |
| Ghana | 3 | 1 | 2 | 0 | 2 | 1 | +1 | 5 |
| Nigeria | 3 | 0 | 1 | 2 | 5 | 6 | −1 | 1 |
| Burkina Faso | 3 | 0 | 1 | 2 | 3 | 5 | −2 | 1 |
| Liberia (W) | 0 | 0 | 0 | 0 | 0 | 0 | 0 | 0 |

(W) Withdrew
31 July 1999

| Ghana | 0–0 | Burkina Faso |

1 August 1999

| Ivory Coast | 1–1 | Nigeria |

3 August 1999

| Burkina Faso | 0–2 | Ivory Coast |

3 August 1999

| Ghana | 2–1 | Nigeria |

2 August 1999

| Nigeria | 3–3 | Burkina Faso |

5 August 1999

| Ivory Coast | 0–0 | Ghana |

Ivory Coast qualified.

=== Zone IV (Central Africa) ===
First round

| Team 1 | Agg. | Team 2 | 1st leg | 2nd leg |
|---|---|---|---|---|
| Central African Rep. (Central African Republic) | 3–2 | Gabon | 1–0 | 2–2 |
| Rwanda | w/o | (Republic of the Congo) Congo | — | — |
| Cameroon | bye | | | |
| DR Congo (Democratic Republic of the Congo) | bye | | | |

Second round

| Team 1 | Agg. | Team 2 | 1st leg | 2nd leg |
|---|---|---|---|---|
| Central African Rep. (Central African Republic) | w/o | (Democratic Republic of the Congo) DR Congo | — | — |
| Rwanda | 1–6 | Cameroon | 0–4 | 1–2 |

Third round

| Team 1 | Agg. | Team 2 | 1st leg | 2nd leg |
|---|---|---|---|---|
| Central African Rep. (Central African Republic) | 1–5 | Cameroon | 0–3 | 1–2 |

Cameroon qualified.

=== Zone V (East Africa) ===
First round

| Team 1 | Agg. | Team 2 | 1st leg | 2nd leg |
|---|---|---|---|---|
| Ethiopia | 1–3 | Uganda | 1–0 | 0–3 |
| Eritrea | w/o | Sudan | — | — |
| Egypt | bye | | | |
| Kenya | bye | | | |

Second round

| Team 1 | Agg. | Team 2 | 1st leg | 2nd leg |
|---|---|---|---|---|
| Uganda | 2–0 | Kenya | 2–0 | 0–0 |
| Eritrea | 0–0 (4–1 p) | Egypt | 0–0 | 0–0 |

Third round

| Team 1 | Agg. | Team 2 | 1st leg | 2nd leg |
|---|---|---|---|---|
| Eritrea | 3–4 | Uganda | 1–1 | 2–3 |

Uganda qualified.

=== Zone VI (Southern Africa) ===
First round

| Team 1 | Agg. | Team 2 | 1st leg | 2nd leg |
|---|---|---|---|---|
| Mozambique | 2–2 (a) | (Eswatini) Swaziland | 0–0 | 2–2 |

Second round

| Team 1 | Agg. | Team 2 | 1st leg | 2nd leg |
|---|---|---|---|---|
| Mozambique | 2–2 (5–6 p) | Angola | 1–1 | 1–1 |
| Botswana | 1–5 | Zimbabwe | 1–3 | 0–2 |
| Malawi | 1–5 | Zambia | 0–2 | 1–3 |
| Lesotho | 2–1 | Namibia | 1–0 | 1–1 |

Third round

| Team 1 | Agg. | Team 2 | 1st leg | 2nd leg |
|---|---|---|---|---|
| Zimbabwe | 4–3 | Angola | 3–2 | 1–1 |
| Lesotho | 0–1 | Zambia | 0–0 | 0–1 |

Fourth round

| Team 1 | Agg. | Team 2 | 1st leg | 2nd leg |
|---|---|---|---|---|
| Zambia | 5–1 | Zimbabwe | 3–0 | 2–1 |

Zambia qualified.

=== Zone VII (Indian Ocean) ===
| Team 1 | Agg. | Team 2 | 1st leg | 2nd leg |
|---|---|---|---|---|
| Mauritius | w/o | Madagascar | — | — |

Mauritius qualified.

== Qualifying teams ==
The following countries have qualified for the final tournament:

| Zone | Team |
|---|---|
| Hosts | South Africa |
| Zone I | Algeria |
| Zone II | Mali |
| Zone III | Ivory Coast |
| Zone IV | Cameroon |
| Zone V | Uganda |
| Zone VI | Zimbabwe |
| Zone VII | Mauritius |
