= Football at the 1995 All-Africa Games – Men's qualification =

The men's qualification for football tournament at the 1995 All-Africa Games.

== Qualification stage ==
=== Zone I (North Africa) ===
Libya and Morocco withdrew.

Team 1	Agg.	Team 2	1st leg	2nd leg
Algeria	2–1	Tunisia	1–0	1–1

... February 1995

Algeria	1–0	Tunisia
Goal

Algiers
26 February 1995

Tunisia	1–1	Algeria
Goal		Goal

Tunis

Algeria qualified.

=== Zone II (West Africa 1) ===
First round

Team 1	Agg.	Team 2	1st leg	2nd leg
Sierra Leone	w/o	Liberia	—	—

Second round

Team 1	Agg.	Team 2	1st leg	2nd leg
Guinea	w/o	Sierra Leone	—	—
Senegal	2–1	Mali	0–0	2–1

Third round

Team 1	Agg.	Team 2	1st leg	2nd leg
Guinea	1–0	Senegal	1–0	0–0

Guinea qualified.

=== Zone III (West Africa 2) ===
First round

Team 1	Agg.	Team 2	1st leg	2nd leg
Ghana	w/o	Niger	—	—
Nigeria	3–0	Ivory Coast	1–0	2–0

Second round

Team 1	Agg.	Team 2	1st leg	2nd leg
Nigeria	w/o	Ghana	—	—

Nigeria qualified.

=== Zone IV (Central Africa) ===
First round

Team 1	Agg.	Team 2	1st leg	2nd leg
Cameroon	w/o	Burundi	—	—
Congo (Republic of the Congo)	w/o	Zaire	4–2	—

Second round

Team 1	Agg.	Team 2	1st leg	2nd leg
Congo (Republic of the Congo)	2–1	Cameroon	0–1	2–0

Congo qualified.

=== Zone V (East Africa) ===
First round

Team 1	Agg.	Team 2	1st leg	2nd leg
Sudan	w/o	Kenya	—	—

Second round

Team 1	Agg.	Team 2	1st leg	2nd leg
Egypt	w/o	Sudan	—	—

Egypt qualified.

=== Zone VI (Southern Africa) ===
First round

Team 1	Agg.	Team 2	1st leg	2nd leg
Lesotho	w/o	Botswana	—	—
South Africa	1–1 (a)	Angola	0–0	1–1
Malawi	bye			
Zambia	bye			

Second round

Team 1	Agg.	Team 2	1st leg	2nd leg
South Africa	3–0	Lesotho	2–0	1–0
Zambia	2–1	Malawi	0–1	2–0

Third round

Team 1	Agg.	Team 2	1st leg	2nd leg
Zambia	2–1	(Malawi) South Africa	2–0	0–1

Zambia qualified.

=== Zone VII (Indian Ocean) ===
Team 1	Agg.	Team 2	1st leg	2nd leg
Mauritius	w/o	Madagascar	—	—

Mauritius qualified.

== Qualifying teams ==
The following countries have qualified for the final tournament:

Zone	Team
Hosts	Zimbabwe
Zone I	Algeria
Zone II	Guinea
Zone III	Nigeria
Zone IV	Congo
Zone V	Egypt
Zone VI	Zambia
Zone VII	Mauritius
