= Football at the 1992 Summer Olympics – Men's African Qualifiers =

1992 Summer Olympics – Men's Football African Qualifiers
- Dates: 11 August 1991 – 23 February 1992

The African Men's Olympic Qualifiers was held to determine the three African national teams for under 23 that will participate at the 1992 Summer Olympics football tournament held in Barcelona.

== First round ==
Team 1	Agg.	Team 2	1st leg	2nd leg
Mauritius	2–2 (a)	Somalia	1–0	1–2
Mozambique	1–0	Swaziland	0–0	1–0
Botswana	1–2	Gabon	0–0	1–2
Ethiopia	w/o	Libya	—	—
Burkina Faso	w/o	Senegal	—	—
Mali	w/o	Sierra Leone	—	—
Gambia	w/o	Mauritania	—	—
Congo	w/o	Togo	—	—

Mauritius	1–0	Somalia

Somalia	2–1	Mauritius

Mozambique	0–0	Swaziland

Swaziland	0–1	Mozambique

Botswana	0–0	Gabon

Gabon	2–1	Botswana
Bongo 34'; Theodore 86' (pen.)		Letsholo 19'

Stade d'Honneur, Libreville
Attendance: 35,000

Ethiopia	w/o	Libya

Libya	w/o	Ethiopia

Burkina Faso	w/o	Senegal

Senegal	w/o	Burkina Faso

Mali	w/o	Sierra Leone

Sierra Leone	w/o	Mali

Gambia	w/o	Mauritania

Mauritania	w/o	Gambia

Congo	w/o	Togo

Togo	w/o	Congo

== Second round ==
=== Group 1 ===
Team 1	Agg.	Team 2	1st leg	2nd leg
Sudan	1–4	Egypt	1–2	0–2
Mozambique	1–4	Uganda	0–1	1–3
Mauritius	exclu.	Zambia	—	—
Ethiopia	w/o	Malawi	—	—
Gabon	exclu.	Cameroon	—	—
Angola	w/o	Ivory Coast	—	—

Sudan	1–2	Egypt
Goal		Ibrahim; Rayyan

23 August 1991

Egypt	2–0	Sudan
Abo Greisha

Mozambique	0–1	Uganda

Uganda	3–1	Mozambique

Mauritius	Cancelled	Zambia

Zambia	Cancelled	Mauritius

Ethiopia	w/o	Malawi

Malawi	w/o	Ethiopia

Gabon	Cancelled	Cameroon

Cameroon	Cancelled	Gabon

Angola	w/o	Ivory Coast

Ivory Coast	w/o	Angola

=== Group 2 ===
Team 1	Agg.	Team 2	1st leg	2nd leg
Tunisia	3–2	Senegal	3–1	0–1
Algeria	0–1	Sierra Leone	0–0	0–1
Morocco	6–0	Mauritania	6–0	0–0
Liberia	w/o	Togo	—	—
Ghana	susp.	Guinea	—	—
Zaire	w/o	Zimbabwe	—	—

Tunisia	3–1	Senegal

Senegal	1–0	Tunisia

11 August 1991

Algeria	0–0	Sierra Leone

25 August 1991

Sierra Leone	1–0	Algeria

11 August 1991

Morocco	6–0	Mauritania
Samadi; Bouhlal; Rokbi; Ammouta

23 August 1991

Mauritania	0–0	Morocco

Liberia	w/o	Togo

Togo	w/o	Liberia

Ghana	Cancelled	Guinea

Guinea	Cancelled	Ghana

Zaire	w/o	Zimbabwe

Zimbabwe	w/o	Zaire

== Third round ==
=== Group 1 ===
Team 1	Agg.	Team 2	1st leg	2nd leg
Egypt	3–1	Malawi	3–1	0–0
Uganda	1–4	Cameroon	1–2	0–2
Mauritius	w/o	Ivory Coast	—	—

Egypt	3–1	Malawi
Ibrahim; Abo Greisha		Goal

Malawi	0–0	Egypt

Uganda	1–2	Cameroon

Cameroon	2–0	Uganda

Mauritius	w/o	Ivory Coast

Ivory Coast	w/o	Mauritius

=== Group 2 ===
Team 1	Agg.	Team 2	1st leg	2nd leg
Tunisia	5–6	Zimbabwe	3–1	2–5
Ghana	4–4 (a)	Sierra Leone	2–1	2–3
Morocco	w/o	Togo	—	—

Tunisia	3–1	Zimbabwe

Zimbabwe	5–2	Tunisia

Ghana	2–1	Sierra Leone

Sierra Leone	3–2	Ghana

Morocco	w/o	Togo

Togo	w/o	Morocco

== Fourth round ==
Team 1	Agg.	Team 2	1st leg	2nd leg
Cameroon	1–2	Morocco	0–0	1–2
Ghana	10–1	Mauritius	6–0	4–1
Egypt	4–1	Zimbabwe	3–0	1–1

9 February 1992

Cameroon	0–0	Morocco

23 February 1992

Morocco	2–1	Cameroon

Morocco won 2–1 on aggregate and qualified for the 1992 Summer Olympics.

Ghana	6–0	Mauritius

Mauritius	1–4	Ghana

Ghana won 10–1 on aggregate and qualified for the 1992 Summer Olympics.

Egypt	3–0	Zimbabwe
Youssef; Abo Greisha

Zimbabwe	1–1	Egypt

Egypt won 4–1 on aggregate and qualified for the 1992 Summer Olympics.
