= Football at the 2000 Summer Olympics – Men's African Qualifiers =

2000 Summer Olympics – Men's Football African Qualifiers
- Dates: 6 December 1998 – 26 March 2000

The African Men's Olympic Qualifiers began in December 1998 and ended in May 2000 and was held to determine the African national teams for under 23 which would participate at the 2000 Summer Olympics football tournament held in Sydney.

== Participants ==
- Algeria
- Angola
- Botswana
- Cameroon
- Congo
- Egypt
- Equatorial Guinea
- Ghana
- Gabon
- Guinea
- Ivory Coast
- Kenya
- Mali
- Mauritius
- Morocco
- Mozambique
- Namibia
- New Zealand
- Nigeria
- Senegal
- Seychelles
- South Africa
- Sudan
- Swaziland
- Tanzania
- Togo
- Tunisia
- Uganda
- Zambia
- Zimbabwe

== Preliminary round ==
Team 1	Agg.	Team 2	1st leg	2nd leg
Seychelles	0–6	Mauritius	0–2	0–4
Kenya	1–2	Tanzania	1–0	0–2
Uganda	2–1	Sudan	2–1	0–0
Botswana	5–2	Swaziland	3–0	2–2
Namibia	3–3 (a)	Mozambique	0–0	3–3
Congo	2–1	Equatorial Guinea	1–0	1–1

6 December 1998

Seychelles	0–2	Mauritius

13 December 1998

Mauritius	4–0	Seychelles

29 November 1998

Kenya	1–0	Tanzania

13 December 1998

Tanzania	2–0	Kenya

29 November 1998

Uganda	2–1	Sudan

13 December 1998

Sudan	0–0	Uganda

29 November 1998

Botswana	3–0	Swaziland

13 December 1998

Swaziland	2–2	Botswana

29 November 1998

Namibia	0–0	Mozambique

13 December 1998

Mozambique	3–3	Namibia

29 November 1998

Congo	1–0	Equatorial Guinea

12 December 1998

Equatorial Guinea	1–1	Congo

== First round ==
=== Group 1 ===
Team 1	Agg.	Team 2	1st leg	2nd leg
Uganda	2–2 (a)	Zambia	1–0	1–2
Nigeria	6–3	Namibia	4–0	2–3
Angola	8–2	Botswana	4–2	4–0
Zimbabwe	w/o	Mauritius	4–1	—

12 June 1999

Uganda	1–0	Zambia

27 June 1999

Zambia	2–1	Uganda

13 June 1999

Nigeria	4–0	Namibia

27 June 1999

Namibia	3–2	Nigeria

13 June 1999

Angola	4–2	Botswana

27 June 1999

Botswana	0–4	Angola

13 June 1999

Zimbabwe	4–1	Mauritius

27 June 1999

Mauritius	w/o	Zimbabwe

=== Group 2 ===
Team 1	Agg.	Team 2	1st leg	2nd leg
Cameroon	5–0	Congo	5–0	0–0
Guinea	5–1	Gabon	4–1	1–0
Ghana	4–2	Tanzania	2–1	2–1
Togo	2–3	South Africa	2–2	0–1

13 June 1999

Cameroon	5–0	Congo

27 June 1999

Congo	0–0	Cameroon

13 June 1999

Guinea	4–1	Gabon

27 June 1999

Gabon	0–1	Guinea

13 June 1999

Ghana	2–1	Tanzania

27 June 1999

Tanzania	1–2	Ghana

13 June 1999

Togo	2–2	South Africa

27 June 1999

South Africa	1–0	Togo

=== Group 3 ===
Team 1	Agg.	Team 2	1st leg	2nd leg
Algeria	2–4	Ivory Coast	1–3	1–1
Tunisia	3–2	Senegal	1–1	2–1
Mali	2–3	Egypt	1–1	1–3
DR Congo	w/o	Morocco	2–1	—

13 June 1999

Algeria	1–3	Ivory Coast

27 June 1999

Ivory Coast	1–1	Algeria

13 June 1999

Tunisia	1–1	Senegal

27 June 1999

Senegal	1–2	Tunisia

13 June 1999

Mali	1–1	Egypt

27 June 1999

Egypt	3–1	Mali

13 June 1999

DR Congo	2–1	Morocco

27 June 1999

Morocco	w/o	DR Congo

== Second round ==
=== Group 1 ===
Pos	Team	Pld	W	D	L	GF	GA	GD	Pts	Qualification
1	Nigeria	6	4	0	2	12	7	+5	12	2000 Summer Olympics
2	Angola	6	4	0	2	13	9	+4	12	
3	Zimbabwe	6	4	0	2	11	11	0	12	
4	Uganda	6	0	0	6	3	12	−9	0	

Rules for classification: Tiebreakers
16 October 1999

Nigeria	2–0	Angola

17 October 1999

Uganda	0–3	Zimbabwe

31 October 1999

Angola	3–1	Uganda

31 October 1999

Zimbabwe	2–1	Nigeria

13 February 2000

Zimbabwe	3–2	Angola

19 February 2000

Uganda	2–3	Nigeria

26 February 2000

Nigeria	1–0	Uganda

26 February 2000

Angola	4–2	Zimbabwe
Akwá 24', 37', 58'; Chinho 81'

12 March 2000

Angola	3–1	Nigeria
Mendonça 35'; Akwá 55'; Rats 60'		(pen.) Ode

12 March 2000

Zimbabwe	1–0	Uganda

26 March 2000

Uganda	0–1	Angola
		83' Chinho

26 March 2000

Nigeria	4–0	Zimbabwe

=== Group 2 ===
Pos	Team	Pld	W	D	L	GF	GA	GD	Pts	Qualification
1	Cameroon	6	5	0	1	12	4	+8	15	2000 Summer Olympics
2	South Africa	6	4	1	1	12	6	+6	13	OFC–CAF play-off
3	Ghana	6	2	1	3	7	9	−2	7	
4	Guinea	6	0	0	6	4	16	−12	0	

Rules for classification: Tiebreakers
17 October 1999

Ghana	2–2	South Africa

17 October 1999

Guinea	0–3	Cameroon

30 October 1999

South Africa	3–1	Guinea

31 October 1999

Cameroon	Abandoned	Ghana

5 December 1999

Cameroon	2–1 Replay	Ghana

19 February 2000

South Africa	2–0	Cameroon

19 February 2000

Ghana	2–0	Guinea

26 February 2000

Cameroon	2–0	South Africa

27 February 2000

Guinea	1–2	Ghana

11 March 2000

South Africa	1–0	Ghana

12 March 2000

Cameroon	2–1	Guinea

26 March 2000

Ghana	0–3	Cameroon

26 March 2000

Guinea	1–4	South Africa

=== Group 3 ===
Pos	Team	Pld	W	D	L	GF	GA	GD	Pts	Qualification
1	Morocco	6	4	1	1	11	8	+3	13	2000 Summer Olympics
2	Egypt	6	3	2	1	11	7	+4	11	
3	Ivory Coast	6	2	2	2	13	10	+3	8	
4	Tunisia	6	0	1	5	5	15	−10	1	

Rules for classification: Tiebreakers
16 October 1999

Morocco	1–0	Egypt

17 October 1999

Tunisia	1–1	Ivory Coast

31 October 1999

Egypt	2–1	Tunisia

31 October 1999

Ivory Coast	4–1	Morocco

20 February 2000

Tunisia	2–4	Morocco

20 February 2000

Ivory Coast	3–3	Egypt

27 February 2000

Egypt	2–1	Ivory Coast

27 February 2000

Morocco	2–0	Tunisia

12 March 2000
18:15

Egypt	1–1	Morocco
Farouk 76'		El Moubarki 24'

Cairo International Stadium, Cairo
12 March 2000

Ivory Coast	3–1	Tunisia

26 March 2000

Morocco	2–1	Ivory Coast

26 March 2000

Tunisia	0–3	Egypt

=== Ranking of second-placed teams ===
Pos	Team	Pld	W	D	L	GF	GA	GD	Pts	Qualification
1	South Africa	6	4	1	1	12	6	+6	13	OFC–CAF play-off
2	Angola	6	4	0	2	13	9	+4	12	
3	Egypt	6	3	2	1	11	7	+4	11	

Rules for classification: Tiebreakers
