= Football at the 2011 All-Africa Games – Men's qualification =

The men's qualification for Under-23 football tournament at the 2011 All-Africa Games.

== Qualification ==
=== Zone 1 (North Africa) ===
Due to the political situation in Libya, the clash was scheduled to take place on 24–26 June 2011 in Alexandria one match, but the Libyan federation withdraw.

Team 1	Agg.	Team 2	1st leg	2nd leg
Egypt	w/o	Libya	—	—

Egypt qualified for the finals tournament.

=== Zone 2 (West Africa 1) ===
==== Preliminary Round ====
Team 1	Agg.	Team 2	1st leg	2nd leg
Guinea	w/o	Mali	—	—
Guinea-Bissau	0–6	Senegal	0–3	0–3

16 April 2011

Guinea-Bissau	0–3	Senegal

1 May 2011

Senegal	3–0	Guinea-Bissau

Guinea-Bissau disqualified for using an overage player. Senegal advanced to the first round.

==== First Round ====
Team 1	Agg.	Team 2	1st leg	2nd leg
Guinea	1–1 (4–5 p)	Senegal	1–0	0–1

3 July 2011

Guinea	1–0	Senegal

10 July 2011

Senegal	1–0	Guinea
Penalties
	5–4

Senegal qualified for the finals tournament.

=== Zone 3 (West Africa 2) ===
==== Preliminary Round ====
Team 1	Agg.	Team 2	1st leg	2nd leg
Liberia	2–7	Nigeria	1–1	1–6
Ghana	w/o	Benin	—	—

16 April 2011

Liberia	1–1	Nigeria

1 May 2011

Nigeria	6–1	Liberia

Nigeria advanced to the first round.

==== First Round ====
Team 1	Agg.	Team 2	1st leg	2nd leg
Nigeria	3–3 (a)	Ghana	3–1	0–2

24–26 June 2011

Nigeria	3–1	Ghana

8–10 July 2011

Ghana	2–0	Nigeria

Ghana qualified for the finals tournament.

=== Zone 4 (Central Africa) ===
==== Preliminary Round ====
Team 1	Agg.	Team 2	1st leg	2nd leg
Gabon	1–3	DR Congo	1–2	0–1
Cameroon	bye			

16 April 2011

Gabon	1–2	DR Congo

1 May 2011

DR Congo	1–0	Gabon

DR Congo advanced to the first round.

==== First Round ====
Team 1	Agg.	Team 2	1st leg	2nd leg
DR Congo	1–3	Cameroon	1–0	0–3

24–26 June 2011

DR Congo	1–0	Cameroon

8–10 July 2011

Cameroon	3–0	DR Congo

Cameroon qualified for the finals tournament.

=== Zone 5 (East Africa) ===
==== Preliminary Round ====
Team 1	Agg.	Team 2	1st leg	2nd leg
Uganda	5–2	Tanzania	2–1	3–1
Eritrea	w/o	Kenya	—	—

16 April 2011

Uganda	2–1	Tanzania

1 May 2011

Tanzania	1–3	Uganda

Uganda advanced to the first round.

==== First Round ====
Team 1	Agg.	Team 2	1st leg	2nd leg
Kenya	w/o	Uganda	1–5	—

24–26 June 2011

Kenya	1–5	Uganda

8–10 July 2011

Uganda	canceled	Kenya

Uganda qualified for the finals tournament.

=== Zone 6 (Southern Africa) ===
==== Preliminary Round ====
Namibia withdrew, allowing South Africa to compete.

Team 1	Agg.	Team 2	1st leg	2nd leg
Swaziland	1–2	Botswana	0–1	1–1
Malawi	4–1	Lesotho	3–0	1–1
Angola	2–6	South Africa*	1–4	1–2
Zambia	3–4	Zimbabwe	2–3	1–1

8 January 2011

Swaziland	0–1	Botswana

22–23 January 2011

Botswana	1–1	Swaziland

Botswana advanced to the first round.

8 January 2011

Malawi	3–0	Lesotho

22–23 January 2011

Lesotho	1–1	Malawi

Malawi advanced to the first round.

8 January 2011

Angola	1–4	South Africa

22–23 January 2011

South Africa	2–1	Angola

South Africa advanced to the first round.

8 January 2011

Zambia	2–3	Zimbabwe

22–23 January 2011

Zimbabwe	1–1	Zambia

Zimbabwe advanced to the first round.

==== First Round ====
Team 1	Agg.	Team 2	1st leg	2nd leg
Malawi	3–5	South Africa	1–4	2–1
Botswana	3–6	Zimbabwe	2–2	1–4

16 April 2011

Malawi	1–4	South Africa

1 May 2011

South Africa	1–2	Malawi

South Africa advanced to the second round.

16 April 2011

Botswana	2–2	Zimbabwe

1 May 2011

Zimbabwe	4–1	Botswana

Zimbabwe advanced to the second round.

==== Second Round ====
The first leg took place on 24–26 June 2011. The second leg took place on 8–10 July 2011.

Team 1	Agg.	Team 2	1st leg	2nd leg
South Africa	2–1	Zimbabwe	2–0	0–1

24–26 June 2011

South Africa	2–0	Zimbabwe

8–10 July 2011

Zimbabwe	1–0	South Africa

South Africa qualified for the finals tournament.

=== Zone 7 (Indian Ocean) ===
==== Preliminary Round ====
Team 1	Agg.	Team 2	1st leg	2nd leg
Madagascar	w/o	Seychelles	—	—

Madagascar qualified for the finals tournament.

== Qualified teams ==
- The following countries have qualified for the final tournament:
- Mozambique (hosts)
- Egypt (zone 1)
- Senegal (zone 2)
- Ghana (zone 3)
- Cameroon (zone 4)
- Uganda (zone 5)
- South Africa (zone 6)
- Madagascar (zone 7)
