= Football at the 1991 All-Africa Games – Men's qualification =

Men's football qualification for the 1991 All-Africa Games

The men's qualification for the 1991 All-Africa Games marked the first time that under-23 teams participated in the tournament.

== Qualification stage ==
=== Zone I (North Africa) ===
Libya and Morocco withdrew from the competition.

Team 1	Agg.	Team 2	1st leg	2nd leg
Algeria	2–2 (a)	Tunisia	1–2	1–0

19 May 1991

Algeria	1–2	Tunisia
Maza		Goal

19 May 1956 Stadium, Annaba
2 June 1991

Tunisia	0–1	Algeria
		Rahem

Stade El Menzah, Tunis

Tunisia qualified.

=== Zone II (West Africa 1) ===
Gambia withdrew from the competition.

Team 1	Agg.	Team 2	1st leg	2nd leg
Mali	1–0	Senegal	1–0	0–0

15 June 1991

Mali	1–0	Senegal
Goal

Sikasso
29 June 1991

Senegal	0–0	Mali

Dakar

Mali qualified.

=== Zone III (West Africa 2) ===
First round

Team 1	Agg.	Team 2	1st leg	2nd leg
Nigeria	3–0	Togo	1–0	2–0
Ivory Coast	w/o	Ghana	—	—

Second round

Team 1	Agg.	Team 2	1st leg	2nd leg
Ivory Coast	1–3	Nigeria	1–0	0–3

Nigeria qualified.

=== Zone IV (Central Africa) ===
The qualifying tournament for Zone IV was combined with the 1990 UDEAC Cup.

Cameroon qualified after Congo's withdrawal.

=== Zone V (East Africa) ===
Team 1	Score	Team 2
Uganda	1–0	Kenya

=== Zone VI (Southern Africa) ===
A tournament was organized in Windhoek, Namibia, featuring teams from Botswana, Zimbabwe, Lesotho, Namibia, Malawi, and Zambia.

Zimbabwe qualified.

=== Zone VII (Indian Ocean) ===
Mauritius qualified.

== Qualifying teams ==
The following countries have qualified for the final tournament:

Zone	Team
Hosts	Egypt
Zone I	Tunisia
Zone II	Mali
Zone III	Nigeria
Zone IV	Cameroon
Zone V	Uganda
Zone VI	Zimbabwe
Zone VII	Mauritius
