= Football at the 2000 Summer Olympics – Men's qualification (OFC–CAF play-off) =

2000 Men's Olympic Football Tournament qualification (OFC–CAF play-off)
- Event: Football at the 2000 Summer Olympics – Men's qualification
New Zealand	South Africa
(New Zealand)	(South Africa)
2	4
- on aggregate

First leg
New Zealand	South Africa
2	3
- Date: 19 May 2000
- Venue: North Harbour Stadium, Auckland
- Referee: Argelio Sabillón (Honduras)
- Attendance: 13,500

Second leg
South Africa	New Zealand
1	0
- Date: 27 May 2000
- Venue: Vosloorus Stadium, Johannesburg
- Attendance: 20,000

The OFC–CAF play-off of the 2000 Olympic Football Tournament qualification competition was a two-legged tie that decided one spot in the 2000 Olympic football tournament in Sydney. The play-off was contested by the winners from the OFC, New Zealand, and the fourth-ranked team from CAF, South Africa.

South Africa won the tie 4–2 on aggregate to qualify for the 2000 Summer Olympics, emerging victorious in both matches with a 3–2 score in the first leg in Auckland and 1–0 in the second leg in Johannesburg.

== Qualified teams ==
Confederation	Placement	Team
OFC	1999 OFC Men's Olympic Qualifying Tournament winners	New Zealand
CAF	African Qualifiers second round best-ranked second-placed team	South Africa

== Summary ==
Team 1	Agg.	Team 2	1st leg	2nd leg
New Zealand	2–4	South Africa	2–3	0–1

== Matches ==
19 May 2000

New Zealand	2–3	South Africa
Urlovic 13'; F. McCarthy 31' (o.g.)	Report	B. McCarthy 20'; Fortune 26'; Booth 88'

North Harbour Stadium, Auckland
Attendance: 13,500
Referee: Argelio Sabillón (Honduras)
27 May 2000

South Africa	1–0	New Zealand
Matsau 87'	Report

Vosloorus Stadium, Johannesburg
Attendance: 20,000

South Africa won 4–2 on aggregate and qualified for the 2000 Summer Olympics.

== Goalscorers ==
There were 6 goals scored in 2 matches, for an average of 3 goals per match.

1 goal

- (New Zealand) Paul Urlovic
- (South Africa) Matthew Booth
- (South Africa) Quinton Fortune
- (South Africa) Daniel Matsau
- (South Africa) Benni McCarthy

1 own goal

- (South Africa) Fabian McCarthy (against New Zealand)
