= Dele Ajiboye =

Nigerian footballer (born 1990)

Personal information
- Full name: Oladele Muniru Ajiboye
- Date of birth: 7 August 1990 (age 36)
- Place of birth: Osogbo, Nigeria
- Height: 1.81 m (5 ft 11 1/2 in)
- Position: Goalkeeper

Team information
- Current team: Plateau United F.C.

Senior career*
Years	Team	Apps	(Gls)
2007–2008	Prime F.C.		
2008–2009	Wikki Tourists		
2009–2011	Pontevedra CF	1	(0)
2011–2013	3SC		(1)
2014–2015	Nasarawa United F.C.		
2016	Warri Wolves F.C.		

International career^{‡}
2007	Nigeria U-17		
2009	Nigeria U-20		
2011	Nigeria U-23		
2018–	Nigeria	3	(0)
- * Club domestic league appearances and goals as of 23 May 2014 ‡ National team caps and goals as of 16 June 2019

Oladele Muniru Ajiboye (born 7 August 1990 in Osogbo, Osun State) is a Nigerian football goalkeeper. He currently plays for Plateau United F.C.

== Career ==
Ajiboye began his career with Prime F.C., and in September 2008 joined Wikki Tourists F.C. after one year with Wikki Tourists, where he played 14 games, he left on 16 September 2009 to sign with the Spanish club Pontevedra CF. After being released from Pontevedra in November 2011, he signed the next month with Shooting Stars. After 3SC's relegation in 2013, he signed to play for Nasarawa United. However, transfer issues kept him from playing until two months into the new season.

== International career ==
Ajiboye represented Nigeria at the 2007 FIFA U-17 World Cup in South Korea, winning the championship with the Golden Eaglets. On 15 December 2008, he was called up to the Nigerian under-20 team for the 2009 African Youth Championship in Rwanda and also played at the 2009 FIFA U-20 World Cup in Egypt.

He was Nigeria's starting goalkeeper for the 2012 Summer Olympics qualifiers and 2011 All Africa Games qualifiers under coach Augustine Eguavoen.

In May 2018, he was named in Nigeria's preliminary-30 man squad for the 2018 FIFA World Cup in Russia. However, he did not make the final 23.

It has been suggested in the media that he is older than his officially-registered age.
