= Football at the 2007 All-Africa Games – Women's qualification =

Football at the All-Africa Games – Women's qualification
Tournament details
- Dates: -
- Teams: (from 1 confederation)

Tournament statistics
- Matches played: 2
- Goals scored: 9 (4.5 per match)

The women's qualification for football tournament at the 2007 All-Africa Games.

== Qualification stage ==
=== Zone I (North Africa) ===
Algeria qualified automatically as hosts.

=== Zone II (West Africa 1) ===
Team 1	Agg.	Team 2	1st leg	2nd leg
Senegal	w/o	Mali	—	—

Senegal qualified.

=== Zone III (West Africa 2) ===
Ghana qualified automatically.

=== Zone IV (Central Africa) ===
Team 1	Agg.	Team 2	1st leg	2nd leg
Cameroon	w/o	(Democratic Republic of the Congo) DR Congo	—	—

Cameroon qualified but withdrew the tournament later.

=== Zone V (East Africa) ===
Team 1	Agg.	Team 2	1st leg	2nd leg
Kenya	n/p	Tanzania	—	—

Match between Kenya and Tanzania not played, no qualified team.

=== Zone VI (Southern Africa) ===
Team 1	Agg.	Team 2	1st leg	2nd leg
Mozambique	w/o	Zambia	—	—
Angola	3–6	South Africa	3–2	0–4

Mozambique and South Africa qualified but Mozambique withdrew the tournament later.

=== Zone VII (Indian Ocean) ===
No representative team.

== Qualifying teams ==
The following 6 nations qualified for women's play at the 2007 All Africa Games.

Zone	Team
Zone I	Algeria (hosts)
Zone II	Senegal
Zone III	Ghana
Zone IV	Cameroon
Zone V	no team
Zone VI	Mozambique
Zone VI	South Africa
Zone VII	no team
