= Angola national under-23 football team =

National association football team

Angola under-23
- Nickname(s): Palancas Negras (Giant Sable Antelopes)
- Association: Angolan Football Federation
- Confederation: CAF (Africa)
- Sub-confederation: COSAFA (Southern Africa)
- Home stadium: Estádio 11 de Novembro
- FIFA code: ANG
First colours	Second colours

Angola Olympic football team represents Angola in international football competitions in Olympic Games. The selection is limited to players under the age of 23, except during the Olympic Games where the use of three overage players is allowed. The team is controlled by the Angolan Football Federation.

== CAF U-23 Championship record ==
CAF U-23 Championship
Appearances: 8 / 12
Year	Round	Position	GP	W	D	L	GS	GA	GD
1984	First	–	2	0	1	1	3	4	-1
1996	Second	–	4	3	0	1	7	4	+3
2000	Second	–	8	6	0	2	21	11	+10
2004	Group	–	8	4	2	2	13	6	+7
2008	Second	–	2	0	1	1	0	2	-2
2011	First	–	2	0	2	0	1	1	0
2019	Second	–	2	0	0	2	1	6	-5
2023	Second	-	4	2	1	1	10	4	6
Total	-	-	32	15	7	10	56	38	+18

== African Games record ==
African Games
Appearances: 5 / 9
Year	Round	Position	GP	W	D	L	GS	GA	GD
1995	First	–	2	0	2	0	1	1	0
1999	Third	–	4	2	2	0	12	12	0
2003	Third	–	4	1	2	1	7	6	+1
2007	Second	–	2	1	0	1	5	6	-1
2011	Preliminary	–	2	0	0	2	2	6	-4
Total	-	-	14	4	6	4	27	31	-4
