= Mannah Chiwisa =

Zambian footballer (born 2003)

Personal information
- Full name: Mannah Chiwisa Mwena
- Date of birth: 12 December 2003 (age 22)
- Place of birth: Zambia
- Height: 1.78 m (5 ft 10 in)
- Position: Midfielder

Youth career
- –2020: Lusaka Youth Soccer Academy
- 2021–2023: Atalanta

Senior career*
Years	Team	Apps	(Gls)
2023–2025	Atalanta	0	(0)
2023–2025	→ Atalanta U23	10	(0)
2025	→ Union Clodiense Chioggia (loan)	9	(0)

International career
- Zambia U17
- Zambia U23
- * Club domestic league appearances and goals as of 25 April 2025

Mannah Chiwisa Mwena (born 12 December 2003) is a Zambian footballer who plays as a midfielder.

== Career ==
Chiwisa was born on 12 December 2003 in Zambia. As a youth player, he joined Zambian side Lusaka Youth Soccer Academy. In 2021, he joined the youth academy of Italian Serie A side Atalanta. He started his senior career with the club. He played in friendlies for the first team during the 2022–23 season. He also played for their reserve team. On 10 September 2023, he debuted for them during a 0–0 draw with Trento.

Chiwisa is a Zambia youth international. He has played for the Zambia national under-17 football team and the Zambia national under-23 football team. He played for the Zambia national under-23 football team for 2023 U-23 Africa Cup of Nations qualification. He was called up to the Zambia national football team preliminary squad for the 2023 Africa Cup of Nations but did not make the final squad.
