= Football at the 1995 All-Africa Games =

1995 All-Africa Games football tournament
Tournament details
- Host country: Zimbabwe
- City: Harare
- Dates: 12–23 September 1995
- Teams: 8 (from 1 confederation)
- Venue(s): 2 (in 2 host cities)

Final positions
- Champions: Egypt (2nd title)
- Runners-up: Zimbabwe
- Third place: Nigeria
- Fourth place: Guinea

Tournament statistics
- Matches played: 18
- Goals scored: 44 (2.44 per match)

The 1995 All-Africa Games football tournament was the 6th edition of the African Games men's football tournament. The football tournament was held in Harare, Zimbabwe between 12–23 September 1995 as part of the 1995 All-Africa Games.

== Qualified teams ==
The following countries have qualified for the final tournament:

Zone	Team
Hosts	Zimbabwe
Zone I	Algeria
Zone II	Guinea
Zone III	Nigeria
Zone IV	Congo
Zone V	Egypt
Zone VI	Zambia
Zone VII	Mauritius

== Final tournament ==
All times given as local time (UTC+2)

=== Group stage ===
Key to colours in group tables
Teams that advanced to the semifinals

==== Group 1 ====
Team	Pld	W	D	L	GF	GA	GD	Pts
Egypt	3	2	0	1	4	2	+2	6
Zimbabwe	3	2	0	1	4	4	0	6
Zambia	3	1	1	1	5	4	+1	4
Congo	3	0	1	2	4	7	−3	1

12 September 1995

Zimbabwe	2–1	Egypt

Harare
12 September 1995

Zambia	3–3	Congo

Harare

15 September 1995

Zimbabwe	0–2	Zambia

Harare
15 September 1995

Egypt	2–0	Congo

Harare

17 September 1995

Egypt	1–0	Zambia

Harare
17 September 1995

Zimbabwe	2–1	Congo

Harare

==== Group 2 ====
Team	Pld	W	D	L	GF	GA	GD	Pts
Guinea	3	2	1	0	4	1	+3	7
Nigeria	3	2	0	1	4	1	+3	6
Algeria	3	1	0	2	2	4	−2	3
Mauritius	3	0	1	2	1	5	−4	1

14 September 1995

Nigeria	2–0	Algeria

Bulawayo
14 September 1995

Mauritius	1–1	Guinea

Bulawayo

16 September 1995

Guinea	1–0	Nigeria

Bulawayo
16 September 1995

Algeria	2–0	Mauritius

Bulawayo

18 September 1995

Guinea	2–0	Algeria

Bulawayo
18 September 1995

Nigeria	2–0	Mauritius

Bulawayo

=== Knockout stage ===
Fifth place
23 September – Harare
Zambia	3
Algeria	2
Seventh place
23 September – Harare
Mauritius	2
Congo	0

==== Seventh place match ====
23 September 1995

Mauritius	2–0	Congo
Goal

Harare

==== Fifth place match ====
23 September 1995

Zambia	3 – 2	Algeria
Goal		Goal

Harare

Semifinals
21 September – Harare
Egypt	1
Nigeria	0
21 September – Harare
Guinea	0
Zimbabwe	2

Final
23 September – Harare
Egypt	3
Zimbabwe	1
Third place
23 September – Harare
Nigeria (p)	1 (4)
Guinea	1 (1)

==== Semifinals ====
21 September 1995

Egypt	1–0	Nigeria
Goal

Harare

21 September 1995

Guinea	0–2	Zimbabwe
		Goal

Harare

==== Third place match ====
23 September 1995

Nigeria	1–1	Guinea
Goal		Goal
Penalties
	4–1

Harare

==== Final ====
23 September 1995
18:00

Egypt	3–1	Zimbabwe
Maher 54', 90'; Komsan 86'		Mbwando 88'

National Sports Stadium, Harare
Attendance: 80,000
Referee: Ian McLeod (South Africa)

== Final ranking ==
Pos	Team	Pld	W	D	L	GF	GA	GD	Pts	Final result
1st place, gold medalist(s)	Egypt	5	4	0	1	8	3	+5	12	Gold Medal
2nd place, silver medalist(s)	Zimbabwe (H)	5	3	0	2	7	7	0	9	Silver Medal
3rd place, bronze medalist(s)	Nigeria	5	2	1	2	5	3	+2	7	Bronze Medal
4	Guinea	5	2	2	1	5	4	+1	8	Fourth place
5	Zambia	4	2	1	1	8	6	+2	7	Eliminated in group stage
6	Algeria	4	1	0	3	4	7	−3	3	Eliminated in group stage
7	Mauritius	4	1	1	2	3	5	−2	4	Eliminated in group stage
8	Congo	4	0	1	3	4	9	−5	1	Eliminated in group stage

Source: rsssf
(H) Hosts
