= Mohamed Baïlou =

Burkinabé professional footballer

Personal information
- Date of birth: 3 March 1991 (age 35)
- Place of birth: Bobo-Dioulasso, Burkina Faso
- Height: 1.97 m (6 ft 6 in)
- Position: Goalkeeper

Team information
- Current team: Gendarmerie Nationale

Senior career*
Years	Team	Apps	(Gls)
2013–2016	RC Bobo Dioulasso		
2016–2017	ASF Bobo Dioulasso		
2017–2018	Salitas		
2018–2020	Racing Club Abidjan		
2020–2021	Ashanti Gold		
2021–	Gendarmerie Nationale		

International career
- Burkina Faso U23
2015	Burkina Faso	3	(0)
- * Club domestic league appearances and goals

Mohamed Baïlou (born 3 March 1991) is a Burkinabé professional footballer who plays as a goalkeeper for Djibouti Premier League club Gendarmerie Nationale. He previously played in the Ghanaian Premier League for Ashanti Gold.

== Club career ==
Baïlou has had stints with Burkinabé Premier League teams RC Bobo Dioulasso, ASF Bobo Dioulasso and Salitas FC. In 2018, he signed a two-year deal with Ivory Coast Ligue 1 team Racing Club Abidjan.

=== Ashanti Gold ===
In October 2020, after the expiration of his contract with Racing Club Abidjan, Baïlou joined the Ghana Premier league Obuasi-based team Ashanti Gold on a free transfer. He was a member of the squad that featured for the club in the 2020–21 CAF Confederation Cup. In the 2020–21 Ghana Premier League season he served as the main goalkeeper of the club as Felix Atuquaye Clottey served as the second. He made 9 appearances in the first round of the season, against Clottey's two. Baïlou played two matches for the Miners in the 2021 Ghanaian FA Cup in their route to the finals. He played in their round of 16 match against Aduana Stars which ended in a 4–2 victory and their quarter-final match against Kintampo Top Talent which ended in a 2–1 victory. Ashanti Gold however lost the finals to Accra Hearts of Oak leaving Baïlou with a silver medal at the end of the season. In total he played thirteen matches for the club and kept four clean sheets.

=== Gendarmerie Nationale ===
In August 2021, Baïlou joined Djibouti Premier League club Gendarmerie Nationale.

== International career ==
Baïlou featured for the Burkina Faso national under-23 football team in the past. He has three international caps for Burkina Faso national football team, making his debut and keeping the post in an international friendly against Kazakhstan on 12 May 2015.

== Honours ==
RC Bobo Dioulasso

- Burkinabé Premier League: 2014–15
- Coupe du Faso: 2014
- Burkinabé Super Cup: 2014

Salitas

- Coupe du Faso: 2018

Racing Club Abidjan

- Ligue 1 Ivory Coast: 2019–20

Ashanti Gold

- Ghanaian FA Cup runner-up: 2021
