= Daniel Matsau =

South African soccer player

Personal information
- Full name: Daniel Tshiu Matsau
- Date of birth: 18 January 1977 (age 49)
- Place of birth: Allanridge, South Africa
- Height: 1.58 m (5 ft 2 in)
- Position: Forward

Senior career*
Years	Team	Apps	(Gls)
–1997	Lorraine Lions		
1997–1998	Hellenic FC		
1998–2002	Kaizer Chiefs	19	(6)
1999–2000	→ Bloemfontein Celtic (loan)	29	(9)
2002–2003	Hellenic FC	26	(10)
2003–2005	SuperSport United	30	(8)
2006–2007	City Pillars		
2007–2009	Mpumalanga Black Aces		

International career
- South Africa U23
2003	South Africa	1	(0)
- * Club domestic league appearances and goals

Daniel Tshiu Matsau (born 18 January 1977) is a South African former soccer player who played as a forward.

== Club career ==
At club level, he played for Lorraine Lions (until 1997), Hellenic FC (1997 to 1998, and again from 2002 to 2003), Kaizer Chiefs (1998 to 2002), Bloemfontein Celtic (on loan for the 1999–2000 season), SuperSport United (2003 to 2005), City Pillars (2006 to 2007) and Mpumalanga Black Aces (2007 to 2009).

== International career ==
He competed in the men's tournament at the 2000 Summer Olympics. He was capped once by the senior national team in 2003.
