= Massamba Ndiaye =

Senegalese footballer (born 2001)

Personal information
- Date of birth: 8 October 2001 (age 25)
- Place of birth: Senegal
- Height: 2.02 m (6 ft 8 in)
- Position: Goalkeeper

Team information
- Current team: Clermont
- Number: 16

Youth career
- 2019–2021: CNEPS Excellence

Senior career*
Years	Team	Apps	(Gls)
2021–2023	Pau	9	(0)
2022–2023	Pau B	5	(0)
2023–	Clermont B	1	(0)
2023–	Clermont	25	(0)

International career
2022–	Senegal U23	1	(0)
- * Club domestic league appearances and goals as of 12 May 2026

Massamba Ndiaye (born 8 October 2001) is a Senegalese professional footballer who plays as a goalkeeper for Ligue 2 club Clermont.

== Career ==
Ndiaye signed with Pau in 2021 from his native CNEPS Excellence. He extended his professional contract with Pau on 25 May 2022 for three years, keeping him at the club until June 2025.

He made his professional debut for Pau in a 1–1 Ligue 2 tie with Bastia on 5 February 2022.

In August 2023, he signed with a Ligue 1 team Clermont before the start of the season at Ligue 2.

== Career statistics ==
As of match played 6 April 2024

Appearances and goals by club, season and competition
Club	Season	League			National cup		Other		Total	
Club	Season	Division	Apps	Goals	Apps	Goals	Apps	Goals	Apps	Goals
Pau	2021–22	Ligue 2	1	0	0	0	—		1	0
Pau	2022–23	Ligue 2	8	0	3	0	—		11	0
Pau	Total		9	0	3	0	—		12	0
Pau B	2022–23	National 3	5	0	—		—		5	0
Clermont B	2023–24	National 3	1	0	—		—		1	0
Clermont	2023–24	Ligue 2	4	0	1	0	—		5	0
Career total			19	0	4	0	0	0	23	0
