= Ephraim Mashaba =

South African soccer player and manager

Personal information
- Date of birth: 6 August 1950 (age 76)
- Place of birth: Soweto, South Africa

Youth career
- Preston Brothers

Senior career*
Years	Team	Apps	(Gls)
- Orlando Pirates
- Swaraj FC
- Moroka Swallows

Managerial career
- Vaal Reef Stars
- South Africa U20
- 1998–2002: South Africa U23
- 2002–2004: South Africa
- 2004: Black Leopards
- 2008–2010: Swaziland
- South Africa U23
- 2012–2014: South Africa U17
- 2014–2016: South Africa
- 2019: Witbank Spurs
Medal record
Representing South Africa (as manager)
All-Africa Games
Silver medal – second place	2011 Maputo
Bronze medal – third place	1999 Johannesburg
COSAFA Cup
Gold medal – first place	2002 Blantyre / Durban
Gold medal – first place	2016 Windhoek
- * Club domestic league appearances and goals

Ephraim Mashaba (born 6 August 1950) is a South African former soccer player and manager.

== Career ==
Mashaba managed Vaal Reef Stars until the club was relegated from the South African top-tier.

He managed the South Africa national team, but was sacked from the team on the eve of the 2004 African Cup of Nations in January 2004 after previously having been suspended.

A month later, in February 2004, Mashaba took over Black Leopards.

He became manager of the Swaziland national team in May 2008.

He was appointed as manager of the South Africa national team for a second time in July 2014. He was suspended for disciplinary reasons in November 2016, and was sacked for misconduct in December 2016. He failed in his attempt to appeal the decision.

In January 2019 he became manager of Witbank Spurs. After a poor run of form, he was sacked on 3 April 2019.
