= Raymond Mdaka =

South African football manager (born 1970)

Personal information
- Full name: Xaniseka Raymond Mdaka
- Date of birth: 1 January 1970 (age 56)
- Place of birth: Ga-Mokgwathi, Limpopo, South Africa

Team information
- Current team: South Africa U20 (head coach)

Managerial career
- Years: Team
- 2021–2023: Marumo Gallants
- 2024–: South Africa U20
- 2026–: South Africa U23
Medal record
Representing South Africa
U-20 Africa Cup of Nations
Gold medal – first place	2025 Morocco
COSAFA U-20 Youth Championship
Gold medal – first place	2024 Mozambique
Gold medal – first place	2026 Mozambique
- ‡ National team caps and goals as of 1 October 2026

Xaniseka Raymond Mdaka (born 1 January 1970) is a South African former teacher and soccer manager who is the current head coach of the South Africa national under-20 and under-23 teams.

In 2025, he became the first South African coach to win a continental youth title when he won the 2025 U-20 Africa Cup of Nations.

== Personal life ==
Mdaka grew up in Ga-Mokgwathi village outside Tzaneen and is of Balobedu heritage. He is the sixth of nine children.

He matriculated at Gwambeni High School and obtained his teaching diploma at Giyani College of Education.

== Managerial career ==
=== Marumo Gallants ===
He led Marumo Gallants to their first semi-final at the 2022–23 CAF Confederation Cup.

=== South Africa under-20 ===
Mdaka was appointed Amajita coach in 2024. He won the 2024 COSAFA U-20 Cup with the team not conceding in the entire tournament and qualified for the 2025 U-20 Africa Cup of Nations.

At the 2025 U-20 Africa Cup of Nations he became the first South African coach to win a youth continental title after his team defeated Morocco 1–0 in the final. He then lead the team to their second round of 16 finish at the 2025 FIFA U-20 World Cup in sixteen years.

At the 2026 COSAFA U-20 Cup, he won his second COSAFA U-20 title and qualified the team to the 2027 U-20 Africa Cup of Nations.

=== South Africa under-23 ===
In 2026, Mdaka was appointed head coach of the South Africa under-23 team.

== Honours ==
- U-20 Africa Cup of Nations: 2025
- COSAFA U-20 Cup: 2024, 2026
