= Noel Mwandila =

Zambian footballer (born 1982)

Personal information
- Date of birth: 28 December 1982 (age 43)
- Position: Midfielder

Senior career*
Years	Team	Apps	(Gls)
2003–2008	Green Buffaloes F.C.		
2008–2010	Winners Park F.C.		
2010–2015	Green Buffaloes F.C.		

International career
2003–2006	Zambia	13	(3)
- * Club domestic league appearances and goals

Noel Mwandila (born 28 December 1982) is a retired Zambian football midfielder.
