= Mauritania national under-23 football team =

Mauritania U-23
- Nickname(s): المرابطون (Murabitun)
- Association: Football Federation of the Islamic Republic of Mauritania
- Confederation: CAF (Africa)
- Sub-confederation: WAFU
- Head coach: Taleb Lemrabott
- Home stadium: Nouakchott Olympic Stadium
- FIFA code: MTN
First colours	Second colours

Olympic Games
- Appearances: 0

African Games
- Appearances: 0

U-23 Africa Cup of Nations
- Appearances: 0

The Mauritania national under-23 football team represents Mauritania in international football competitions including the Olympic Games. The selection is limited to players under the age of 23, except during the Olympic Games where the use of three overage players is allowed. The team is controlled by the Football Federation of the Islamic Republic of Mauritania.

== Competitive record ==
=== Arab Games ===
Arab Games record
Appearances: 4
Year	Round	Position	Pld	W	D	L	GF	GA
(Egypt) 1953	Part of France							
(Lebanon) 1957	Part of France							
(Morocco) 1961	Did not enter							
(United Arab Republic) 1965	Did not enter							
(Syria) 1976	Group stage	7th	6	0	0	6	2	13
(Morocco) 1985	Group stage	11th	3	0	0	3	2	12
(Syria) 1992	Did not enter							
(Lebanon) 1997	Group stage	8th	3	0	0	3	2	6
(Jordan) 1999	Did not enter							
(Algeria) 2004	No tournament							
(Egypt) 2007	Did not enter							
(Qatar) 2011	Did not enter							
(Algeria) 2023	Group stage	7th	3	0	2	1	4	6
Total	Group stage	4/12	15	0	2	13	10	37

- Prior to the Algeria 2023 campaign, the Football at the Arab Games was open to full senior national teams.

== See also ==
- Mauritania national football team
