= Sibusiso Ntuli =

South African soccer player

Personal information
- Full name: Sibusiso Spoko Ntuli
- Date of birth: 10 October 1988 (age 38)
- Place of birth: Umlazi, South Africa
- Height: 1.74 m (5 ft 8 1/2 in)
- Position: Midfielder

Team information
- Current team: Milano United
- Number: 26

Youth career
- 1999–2005: Dlangezwa
- 2004–2006: London Cosmos

Senior career*
Years	Team	Apps	(Gls)
2006–2007	AmaZulu	10	(3)
2008	Western Province United	13	(2)
2009	Nathi Lions	20	(7)
2009–2013	Cape Town	?	(?)
2011	→ Nitra (loan)	9	(4)
2013–2014	Milano United	16	(2)

International career
2005–2009	South Africa U20	9	(5)
- * Club domestic league appearances and goals as of 2 August 2014

Sibusiso Spoko Ntuli (born 10 October 1988 in Umlazi) is a South African football midfielder who currently plays for Milano United.

== Career ==
He played for National First Division club Nathi Lions, AmaZulu and had a short stint with another First Division side Western Province United. and Cape Town. In July 2011, he joined Slovak club FC Nitra.

== International career ==
Ntuli is a former South Africa U20 international striker.
