= Fabian McCarthy (South African soccer) =

South African footballer

Fabian McCarthey
Personal information
- Full name: Fabian Ansley McCarthy
- Date of birth: 13 May 1977 (age 49)
- Place of birth: Vryburg, South Africa
- Height: 1.79 m (5 ft 10 1/2 in)
- Position: Central defender

Youth career
- Anderlecht FC (South Africa)
- O.I. Celtic

Senior career*
Years	Team	Apps	(Gls)
1997–2000	Bloemfontein Celtic	67	(1)
2000–2003	Mamelodi Sundowns	65	(1)
2003–2008	Kaizer Chiefs	120	(4)
2008–2010	Moroka Swallows	16	(0)
2010–2011	Maritzburg United	6	(0)
2011	Mpumalanga Black Aces	11	(0)

International career^{‡}
1999–2001	South Africa	10	
- * Club domestic league appearances and goals as of 14 September 2011 ‡ National team caps and goals as of 14 September 2011

Fabian McCarthy (born 13 May 1977) is a South African former soccer player who played as a central defender.

McCarthy competed for South Africa at the 2000 Summer Olympics.
