= U-23 Africa Cup of Nations =

African qualification tournament for the Summer Olympics

- Organiser(s): CAF
- Founded: 2011; 15 years ago
- Region: Africa
- Teams: 8
- Current champions: Morocco (1st title)
- Most championships: Egypt; Gabon; Morocco; Nigeria; (1 title each)
- Website: Official website
- 2027 U-23 Africa Cup of Nations

The U-23 Africa Cup of Nations, known for sponsorship purposes as the TotalEnergies U-23 Africa Cup of Nations, or simply U-23 AFCON or U-23 CAN, is the quadrennial African football tournament organized by the Confederation of African Football (CAF) for its nations, consisting of players under 23 years of age, and was first held in 2011. It has been held every four years since its inauguration. Until 2028, the top three countries/nations qualified directly from every edition of this tournament for the football tournament of the Olympic Games; FIFA and the IOC approved a 12‑team men's tournament for 2028 and reduced the number of CAF entries to two.

Egypt, Gabon, Morocco and Nigeria are the most successful teams in this tournament with each winning a single title. Morocco and Egypt are the only country to have played the final twice. Morocco are the tournament's current champions, having beaten Egypt 2-1 in the 2023 final.

== History ==
Beginning in 1956, the year before the foundation of CAF, there has been qualification tournaments for the Olympic Games football tournament for African teams, but they were on a home-and-away basis. In 2011, CAF formed a full-time standalone qualification tournament to align with the upgrades to its U-20 and U-17 competitions and named it the African U-23 Championship. On 6 August 2015, the CAF Executive Committee decided to change the tournament's name to the Africa U-23 Cup of Nations, similar to the senior's version, Africa Cup of Nations. However the name on the tournament logo for the forthcoming 2015 edition would read as the U-23 Africa Cup of Nations.

On 21 July 2016, French energy and petroleum giant TotalEnergies (formerly Total S.A.) secured an 8-year sponsorship package from CAF to support its competitions.

Egypt hosted the 2019 tournament, and was won by them, making Egypt the first host nation to win the title in home country.

The 2023 tournament was hosted by Morocco, making it the second time the country has hosted this tournament. The tournament started on 24 June and ended on 8 July. The Final between Egypt and Morocco was held at Prince Moulay Abdellah Stadium in Rabat. Morocco defeated Egypt 2–1, to win their first ever title.

== Results ==
Coincidentally, every final has had the same scoreline.

Year	Host	Final			Third place match		
Year	Host	Winner	Score	Runners-up	Third place	Score	Fourth place
2011	Morocco	Gabon	2–1	Morocco	Egypt	2–0	Senegal
2015	Senegal	Nigeria	2–1	Algeria	South Africa	0–0 (3–1 p)	Senegal
2019	Egypt	Egypt	2–1 (a.e.t.)	Ivory Coast	South Africa	2–2 (6–5 p)	Ghana
2023	Morocco	Morocco	2–1 (a.e.t.)	Egypt	Mali	0–0 (4–3 p)	Guinea
2027	Egypt		–			–	

== Successful national teams ==
Team	Champions	Runners-up	Third-place	Fourth-place
Egypt	1 (2019*)	1 (2023)	1 (2011)	–
Morocco	1 (2023*)	1 (2011*)	–	–
Gabon	1 (2011)	–	–	–
Nigeria	1 (2015)	–	–	–
Algeria	–	1 (2015)	–	–
Ivory Coast	–	1 (2019)	–	–
South Africa	–	–	2 (2015, 2019)	–
Mali	–	–	1 (2023)	–
Senegal	–	–	–	2 (2011, 2015*)
Ghana	–	–	–	1 (2019)
Guinea	–	–	–	1 (2023)

*= Hosts

== Champions by region ==
Regional federation	Champion(s)	Title(s)
UNAF (North Africa)	Egypt (1), Morocco (1)	2
WAFU (West Africa)	Nigeria (1)	1
UNIFFAC (Central Africa)	Gabon (1)	1
COSAFA (Southern Africa)	-	0
CECAFA (East Africa)	-	0

== Participating nations ==
Team	(Morocco) 2011 (8)	(Senegal) 2015 (8)	(Egypt) 2019 (8)	(Morocco) 2023 (8)	(Egypt) 2027 (?)	Years
Algeria	GS	2nd	•	•		2
Cameroon	•	•	GS	•		1
Congo	•	•	•	GS		1
Egypt	3rd	GS	1st	2nd	Q	4
Gabon	1st	•	•	GS		2
Ghana	•	•	4th	GS		2
Guinea	•	×	•	4th		1
Ivory Coast	GS	•	2nd	•		2
Mali	•	GS	GS	3rd		3
Morocco	2nd	•	•	1st		2
Niger	×	×	•	GS		1
Nigeria	GS	1st	GS	•		3
Senegal	4th	4th	•	•		2
South Africa	GS	3rd	3rd	•		3
Tunisia	•	GS	•	•		1
Zambia	•	GS	GS	•		2

Legend

- 1st – Champions
- 2nd – Runners-up
- 3rd – Third place
- 4th – Fourth place
- GS – Group stage
- Q – Qualified
- — Hosts
- × – Did not enter
- • – Did not qualify
- × – Withdrew before qualification
- — Withdrew after qualification
- — Disqualified after qualification

== Results at the Olympics (2012–present) ==
Nation	12	16	20	24	Years
Algeria	–	14	–	–	1
Egypt	8	–	8	4	3
Gabon	12	–	–	–	1
Guinea	–	–	–	16	1
Ivory Coast	–	–	7	–	1
Mali	–	–	–	14	1
Morocco	11	–	–	3	2
Nigeria	–	3	–	–	1
Senegal	6	–	–	–	1
South Africa	–	13	16	–	2

== Awards ==
=== Player of the Tournament ===
Originally called the "Most Valuable Player (MVP)" until the 2019 edition.

Year	Golden Player
2015	(Nigeria) Azubuike Okechukwu
2019	(Egypt) Ramadan Sobhi
2023	(Egypt) Ibrahim Adel

=== Goalkeeper of the Tournament ===
Year	Best Goalkeeper
2015	(Algeria) Abdelkader Salhi
2019	(Egypt) Mohamed Sobhy
2023	(Egypt) Hamza Alaa

=== Top goalscorer ===
This is awarded to the player(s) who score the most goals during each edition of the tournament.

Edition	Top goalscorer	Goals
Morocco 2011	(Morocco) Abdelaziz Barrada; (Nigeria) Raheem Lawal	3
Senegal 2015	(Nigeria) Etebo Oghenekaro	5
Egypt 2019	(Egypt) Mostafa Mohamed	4
Morocco 2023	(Morocco) Abde Ezzalzouli; (Morocco) Yanis Begraoui; (Ghana) Emmanuel Yeboah	3

== See also ==
- Africa Cup of Nations
- U-20 Africa Cup of Nations
- U-17 Africa Cup of Nations
- Football at the African Games
- Football at the Summer Olympics
