= Zimbabwe national under-23 football team =

National association football team

Zimbabwe
- Nickname: The Warriors
- Association: Zimbabwe Football Association
- Confederation: CAF (Africa)
- Sub-confederation: COSAFA (Southern Africa)
- Head coach: Michael Nees
- Captain: Knowledge Musona
- Home stadium: National Sports Stadium
- FIFA code: ZIM
First colours	Second colours

First international
- Malawi 1–1 Zimbabwe (Lilongwe; 3 August 1986)

Biggest win
- Egypt 2–3 Zimbabwe (Islamia, Egypt; 23 September 1987)

Biggest defeat
- Malawi 4–2 Zimbabwe (Lilongwe Malawi; 9 April 1987)

African Games
- Appearances: 3 (first in 1991)
- Best result: Silver Medal (1995)

The Zimbabwe national under-23 football team (Nicknamed The Warriors), represents Zimbabwe in men's under-23 international football and is controlled by the Zimbabwe Football Association (ZIFA), formerly known as the Football Association of Rhodesia.

== Players ==
The following players were selected for the U-23 Africa Cup of Nations qualification matches against Mali on 11 and 17 November 2026.

No.	Pos.	Player	Date of birth (age)	Caps	Goals	Club
	GK	Tatenda Chikowero		0	0	(Zimbabwe Football Association) Ngezi Platinum
	GK	Jayden Garthwaite	31 January 2010 (age 16)	0	0	(The Football Association) Aston Villa
	GK	Joseph Kaunda		0	0	(Zimbabwe Football Association) Manica Diamonds
	DF	Allan Chapinduka		0	0	(Zimbabwe Football Association) TelOne
	DF	Takudzwa Gwanzura	10 February 2008 (age 18)	0	0	(The Football Association) Norwich City
	DF	Jayden Munikwa	5 October 2008 (age 18)	0	0	(The Football Association) Norwich City
	DF	Nisbert Muzenda		0	0	(Zimbabwe Football Association) Ngezi Platinum
	DF	Richard Nkomo	6 February 2007 (age 19)	0	0	(Football Australia) South Melbourne
	DF	Ethan Sutherland	24 May 2006 (age 20)	0	0	(The Football Association) Exeter City
	DF	Dylan Tawodzera	7 October 2007 (age 19)	0	0	(The Football Association) Huddersfield Town
	MF	Miles Bracking	14 July 2007 (age 19)	0	0	(The Football Association) Hornchurch
	MF	Garie Junior Brendon Chibika		0	0	(Zimbabwe Football Association) Chicken Inn
	MF	Seth Chingwaro	7 December 2007 (age 18)	0	0	(The Football Association) Fulham
	MF	Junior Chigumbu		0	0	(Zimbabwe Football Association) Houtbay United
	MF	Kristian Clark	2 November 2006 (age 20)	0	0	(The Football Association) Nottingham Forest
	MF	Tinashe Manyumba	3 October 2008 (age 18)	0	0	(The Football Association) Leicester City
	MF	Menzi Mazwi	18 April 2006 (age 20)	0	0	(The Football Association) Buxton
	MF	Tanaka Munemo	15 November 2006 (age 19)	0	0	(Zimbabwe Football Association) Ngezi Platinum
	MF	Prosper Padera	9 October 2006 (age 20)	0	0	(Football Association of Finland) SJK Seinäjoki
	FW	David Chigwada	15 October 2007 (age 19)	0	0	(The Football Association) Brentford
	FW	Reece Evans	25 September 2005 (age 21)	0	0	(The Football Association) Bedford Town
	FW	Vernon Masara	18 April 2007 (age 19)	0	0	(The Football Association) Peterborough United
	FW	Elisha Pfupa		0	0	(The Football Association) Portsmouth

== Recent results & fixtures ==
The following is a list of match results from the previous 12 months, as well as any future matches that have been scheduled.

Win Draw Loss

== Competitive records ==
=== Olympic Games ===
Year	Round	Position	Pld	W	D	L	GF	GA
1900–2020	Did not qualify							

=== Africa Cup of Nations ===
Year	Round	Position	Pld	W	D	L	GF	GA
2011–2019	Did not qualify							

=== All Africa Games ===
African Games record
Hosts/Year	Result	GP	W	D*	L	GS	GA
1965–1987	Did not qualify						
(Egypt) 1991	Fourth-place	5	2	0	3	6	10
(Zimbabwe) 1995	Runners-up	5	3	2	1	7	7
(South Africa) 1999	Did not qualify						
(Nigeria) 2003	Did not qualify						
(Algeria) 2007	Did not qualify						
(Mozambique) 2011	Did not qualify						
(Republic of the Congo) 2015	Group stage	3	1	0	1	1	2
(Morocco) 2019	Did not qualify						
Total	3/12	13	6	2	5	14	19

*Draws include knockout matches decided by penalty shootout.
