= Burkina Faso national under-23 football team =

National association football team

Burkina Faso Olympic football team
- Association: Burkinabé Football Federation
- Confederation: CAF (Africa)
- FIFA code: BFA
First colours	Second colours

Olympic Games
- Appearances: 0

All-Africa Games
- Appearances: 2 (first in 1973)
- Best result: Runner Up: 2015

Burkina Faso Olympic football team represents Burkina Faso in international football competitions in Olympic Games. The selection is limited to players under the age of 23, except during the Olympic Games where the use of three overage players is allowed. The team is controlled by the Burkinabé Football Federation.

== Other achievements ==
- All Africa Games
  - Silver Medal: 2015

== Current squad ==
20-man Squad called for the 2015 All-Africa Games.

No.	Pos.	Player	Date of birth (age)	Club
1	GK	Kouakou Herve Koffi	16 October 1996 (aged 18)	
2	MF	Adama Barro	3 September 1996 (aged 19)	
3	MF	Abdoul Karim Dit Zoko Nikiema	24 July 1993 (aged 22)	
4	DF	Delwende Ismael Yanogo	12 September 1993 (aged 21)	
5	DF	Ziem Somda	30 November 1993 (aged 21)	
6	DF	Biassoum Cheick Abdoul Rachid Coulibaly	28 February 1993 (aged 22)	
7	FW	Romaric Pitroipa	31 December 1994 (aged 20)	
8	MF	Assane Achaby Gimbou	9 September 1993 (aged 21)	
9	FW	Omar Kabore	30 August 1993 (aged 22)	
10	MF	Sydney Mohamed Sylla	27 December 1996 (aged 18)	
11	DF	Fousseni Beao	31 December 1993 (aged 21)	
12	FW	Francis Kabore	3 June 1994 (aged 21)	
13	FW	Ilasse Sawadogo	26 February 1996 (aged 19)	
14	MF	Zerbo Zakaria	29 August 1994 (aged 21)	
15	FW	Ousmane Nana	14 April 1994 (aged 21)	
16	GK	Mohamed Bailou	21 May 1995 (aged 20)	
17	FW	Zakaria Sanogo	11 December 1996 (aged 18)	
18	MF	Patrice Zoungrana	2 December 1994 (aged 20)	
19	MF	Arba Djoda Dicko	7 January 1994 (aged 21)	
20	DF	Emmanuel David Gora	28 December 1996 (aged 18)	
