= Football at the 2015 African Games =

Tournament details
- Host country: Congo
- City: Brazzaville
- Dates: 6–18 September
- Teams: 8 (men) + 8 (women) (from 1 confederation)
- Venue(s): 2 (in 1 host city)

Final positions
- Champions: Senegal M Ghana W
- Runners-up: Burkina Faso M Cameroon W
- Third place: Nigeria M Ivory Coast W

Tournament statistics
- Matches played: 26
- Goals scored: 50 (1.92 per match)

Football at the 2015 African Games was played in Brazzaville, the Republic of the Congo between 6–18 September 2015.

== Medal summary ==
=== Results ===
Event	Gold	Silver	Bronze
Men	Senegal	Burkina Faso	Nigeria
Women	Ghana	Cameroon	Ivory Coast

=== Medal table ===
Rank	Nation	Gold	Silver	Bronze	Total
1	Ghana (GHA)	1	0	0	1
1	Senegal (SEN)	1	0	0	1
3	Burkina Faso (BUR)	0	1	0	1
3	Cameroon (CMR)	0	1	0	1
5	Ivory Coast (CIV)	0	0	1	1
5	Nigeria (NGR)	0	0	1	1
Totals (6 entries)		2	2	2	6
