= Football at the 2019 African Games =

Tournament details
- Host country: Morocco
- City: Rabat
- Dates: 16–30 August
- Teams: (from 1 confederation)

Football at the 2019 African Games was played in Rabat, Morocco between 16–30 August 2019.

Two tournaments were held: the men's tournament and the women's tournament.

== Medal summary ==
=== Results ===
Event	Gold	Silver	Bronze
Men	Burkina Faso	Nigeria	Senegal
Women	Nigeria	Cameroon	Morocco
