= South Africa national under-23 soccer team =

National association football team

South Africa U-23
- Nickname: Amaglug-glug
- Association: South African Football Association
- Confederation: CAF (Africa)
- Sub-confederation: COSAFA
- Head coach: Raymond Mdaka
- Most caps: Kamohelo Mokotjo (18 caps)
- Top scorer: Kermit Erasmus (7 goals)
- FIFA code: RSA
First colours	Second colours

First international
- South Africa 0–0 Ghana

Biggest win
- South Africa 5–0 Zimbabwe (Johannesburg, South Africa; 6 September 2019)

Biggest defeat
- South Africa 0–3 Egypt (Egypt;13 June 2021)

Olympic Games
- Appearances: 3 (first in 2000)
- Best result: Group Stage (2000, 2016, 2020)

Africa U-23 Cup of Nations
- Appearances: 3 (first in 2011)
- Best result: (bronze) Third place (2015, 2019)

African Games
- Appearances: 4 (first in 1999)
- Best result: (silver) Silver Medal (2011)

The South Africa national under-23 football team is a youth football team, which represents South Africa and is controlled by the South African Football Association, the governing body for football in South Africa. The team's main objectives are to qualify and play at the All-Africa Games and Olympic Games. The team has played at five All-Africa Games and three Olympic tournaments.

== History ==
The South Africa national under‑23 team was established in 1994 following the country’s readmission to FIFA, with the aim of developing elite youth players and serving as the pathway to the senior national team. Sponsored by Sasol, the team was nicknamed Amaglug‑glug. Their early landmark achievement came at the 1999 All-Africa Games, where they secured a bronze medal, followed by qualification for the 2000 Sydney Olympics, marking South Africa’s debut in men’s Olympic football.

Throughout the 2010s and 2020s, Amaglug‑glug remained active in continental competition, recording third‑place finishes at the Africa U‑23 Cup of Nations in 2015 and 2019, the latter earned through a dramatic 6–5 penalty shootout win over Ghana after a 2–2 draw. The team also qualified for the Rio 2016 and Tokyo 2021 Olympic Games, though both campaigns ended at the group stage. More recently, the side missed qualification for the 2023 U‑23 AFCON and 2024 Paris Olympics, prompting renewed focus on youth development as they entered qualifiers for the 2027 U‑23 AFCON, the pathway to the 2028 Olympic Games.

== Player eligibility ==
Players who are selected, will be 23 or younger in the following Olympic year. With the next Olympics being held in Los Angeles in 2028, players need to have been born on or after 1 January 2005. At the Olympic finals tournament, the team may be supplemented with 3 over-age players.

== Results and fixtures ==
Legend

Win Draw Lose Fixture

=== 2026 ===
1 October Friendly	South Africa	3–1	Algeria	Bloemfontein, South Africa
15:00 UTC+2				Stadium: Dr. Petrus Molemela Stadium

3 October Friendly	South Africa	1–1	Algeria	Bloemfontein, South Africa
15:00 UTC+2				Stadium: Dr. Petrus Molemela Stadium

9 November U23 AFCON Q	Madagascar	v	South Africa
15:00 UTC+2

17 November U23 AFCON Q	South Africa	v	Madagascar
15:00 UTC+2

== Coaching staff ==
All-time South Africa under-23 coaching records
Coach	Reference
(South Africa) Jean-Michel d'Avray (1994–1997)	
(South Africa) Ephraim Mashaba (1998–2002)	
(South Africa) Kenneth Kubheka (2002–2004)	
(South Africa) Styles Phumo (2004)	
(South Africa) Steve Komphela (2005)	
(South Africa) Pitso Mosimane / (South Africa) Serame Letsoaka (2005)	
(South Africa) Steve Komphela (2005–2007)	
(South Africa) David Notoane (2019–2021)	
(South Africa) Helman Mkhalele (2021–2022)	
(South Africa) David Notoane (2022-2023)	
(South Africa) Morena Ramoreboli (2024)	
(South Africa) Raymond Mdaka (2026–present)	

== Players ==
=== Notable players ===
Players who have previously played for the under-23 team, and have since gone on to play for the senior team:

- Emile Baron
- Brian Baloyi
- Matthew Booth
- Delron Buckley
- Bradley Carnell
- Rowen Fernández
- Stanton Fredericks
- Quinton Fortune
- David Kannemeyer
- Steve Lekoelea
- Jabu Mahlangu
- Benni McCarthy
- Fabian McCarthy
- Aaron Mokoena
- Toni Nhleko
- Siyabonga Nomvete
- Andile Jali
- Thulani Serero
- Eric Mathoho
- Patrick Mbuthu
- Anathi Ashley Sobekiwe
- Thiyekile Gulwa
- Mzun

=== Overage players in Olympic Games ===
Tournament	Player 1	Player 2	Player 3
2000	Brian Baloyi (GK)	Dumisa Ngobe (MF)	did not select
2016	Itumeleng Khune (GK)	Eric Mathoho (DF)	did not select
2020	Ronwen Williams (GK)	did not select	

== Competitive record ==
=== Olympic Games ===
Summer Olympics record
Hosts/Year	Result	GP	W	D*	L	GS	GA
(Spain) 1992	Did not enter						
(United States) 1996	Did not qualify						
(Australia) 2000	Group Stage	3	1	0	2	5	5
(Greece) 2004	Did not qualify						
(China) 2008	Did not qualify						
(United Kingdom) 2012	Did not qualify						
(Brazil) 2016	Group Stage	3	0	2	1	1	2
(Japan) 2020	Group Stage	3	0	0	3	3	8
(France) 2024	Did not qualify						
Total	3/9	9	1	2	6	9	15

- Prior to the 1992 Olympic Games campaign, the Olympic football tournament was open to full senior national teams.

=== Africa U-23 Cup of Nations ===
Africa U-23 Cup of Nations record
Hosts/Year	Result	GP	W	D*	L	GS	GA
(Morocco) 2011	Group stage	3	0	2	1	2	4
(Senegal) 2015	Third place	5	2	1	2	5	7
(Egypt) 2019	Third place	5	1	3	1	3	5
(Morocco) 2023	Did not qualify						
Total	3/4	13	3	6	4	10	16

=== African Games ===
African Games record
Hosts/Year	Result	GP	W	D*	L	GS	GA
(South Africa) 1999	Third Place	5	3	2	0	8	2
(Nigeria) 2003	Group Stage	3	0	1	2	2	6
(Algeria) 2007	Group Stage	3	1	0	2	1	4
(Mozambique) 2011	Runners up	5	2	2	0	5	2
(Republic of the Congo) 2015	Did not qualify						
Total	4/5	16	6	5	4	16	14

*Draws include knockout matches decided by penalty shootout.
