= Football at the African Games =

- Organiser(s): ANOCA
- Founded: 1965; 61 years ago
- Region: Africa
- Teams: 8 (from 1 confederation)
- Current champions: M: Ghana (2nd title); W: Ghana (2nd title)
- Most championships: M: Cameroon (4 titles); W: Nigeria (3 titles)
- Football at the 2023 African Games

The men's association football tournament has been held at every edition of the African Games since 1965. Women's competition was added in 2003.

== History ==
The first tournament started in 1965 in Brazzaville, Congo and was won by the hosts Congo. The first women's tournament started in 2003 in Abuja, Nigeria and was won by Nigeria.

Between 1991 and 2015, age limit for men teams was under-23, same as the age limit in football competitions at the Summer Olympics but since 2019, age limit for men teams was under-20.

== Men's tournament ==
=== Summaries ===
Ed.	Year	Host	Final			Third Place Match		
Ed.	Year	Host	Gold Medal	Score	Silver Medal	Bronze Medal	Score	Fourth Place
Senior teams
1	1965	Brazzaville, Congo	Congo	0–0 (a.e.t.) (7–2 c) (Note: Match won by corner kicks obtained.)	Mali	Ivory Coast	1–0	Algeria
–	1969	Bamako, Mali	(Disrupted by military coup)					
2	1973	Lagos, Nigeria	Nigeria	2–0	Guinea	Egypt	2–1	Ghana
3	1978	Algiers, Algeria	Algeria	1–0	Nigeria	Ghana	1–0	Malawi
4	1987	Nairobi, Kenya	Egypt	1–0	Kenya	Malawi	3–1	Cameroon
U-23 teams
5	1991	Cairo, Egypt	Cameroon	1–0	Tunisia	Nigeria	3–0	Zimbabwe
6	1995	Harare, Zimbabwe	Egypt	3–1	Zimbabwe	Nigeria	1–1 (4–1 p)	Guinea
7	1999	Johannesburg, South Africa	Cameroon	0–0 (a.e.t.) (4–3 p)	Zambia	South Africa	2–0	Uganda
8	2003	Abuja, Nigeria	Cameroon	2–0	Nigeria	Ghana	2–2 (4–1 p)	Zambia
9	2007	Algiers, Algeria	Cameroon	1–0	Guinea	Tunisia	1–0	Zambia
10	2011	Maputo, Mozambique	Ghana	1–1 (a.e.t.) (4–2 p)	South Africa	Cameroon	1–1 (a.e.t.) (5–4 p)	Senegal
11	2015	Brazzaville, Congo	Senegal	1–0	Burkina Faso	Nigeria	0–0 (a.e.t.) (5–3 p)	Congo
U-20 teams
12	2019	Rabat, Morocco	Burkina Faso	2–0	Nigeria	Senegal	0–0 (a.e.t.) (4–3 p)	Mali
13	2023	Accra, Ghana	Ghana	1–0	Uganda	Senegal	2–0	Congo

Notes

Under-23 tournament between 1991 and 2015.
Under-20 since the 2019 edition.

=== Performances by countries for men ===
Team	Gold medals	Silver medals	Bronze medals	Fourth place
Cameroon	4 (1991, 1999, 2003, 2007)		1 (2011)	1 (1987)
Ghana	2 (2011, 2023)		2 (1978, 2003)	1 (1973)
Egypt	2 (1987, 1995)		1 (1973)	
Nigeria	1 (1973)	3 (1978, 2003, 2019)	3 (1991, 1995, 2015)	
Burkina Faso	1 (2019)	1 (2015)		
Senegal	1 (2015)		2 (2019, 2023)	1 (2011)
Congo	1 (1965)			2 (2015, 2023)
Algeria	1 (1978)			1 (1965)
Guinea		2 (1973, 2007)		1 (1995)
Tunisia		1 (1991)	1 (2007)	
South Africa		1 (2011)	1 (1999)	
Zambia		1 (1999)		2 (2003, 2007)
Uganda		1 (2023)		1 (1999)
Mali		1 (1965)		1 (2019)
Zimbabwe		1 (1995)		1 (1991)
Kenya		1 (1987)		
Malawi			1 (1987)	1 (1978)
Ivory Coast			1 (1965)	

=== Top scorers ===
Year	Top scorer(s)	Goals
1987	(Cameroon) Bertin Ollé Ollé (Malawi) Lawrence Waya	4
1991		
1995		
1999	(Ivory Coast) Adama Kone (South Africa) Siyabonga Nomvethe	3
2003	(Cameroon) Marcus Mokaké	6
2007	(Guinea) A. K. Bangoura	3
2011	(Ghana) Mahatma Otoo	4
2015	(Burkina Faso) Mohamed Sydney Sylla (Senegal) Ibrahima Keita	3
2019	(Burkina Faso) Djibril Ouattara (Ghana) Tahiru Awudu	4
2023	(Ghana) Jerry Afriyie	3

=== Participating nations ===
Numbers refer to the final placing of each team at the respective Games.

Nation	65	73	78	87	91	95	99	03	07	11	15	19	23	Years
Algeria	4	Y	1			Y	Y	Y	Y					7
Benin													Y	1
Burkina Faso		Y									2	1		3
Burundi												Y		1
Cameroon			Y	4	1		1	1	1	3				7
Congo	1	Y				Y					4		Y	5
DR Congo	Y													1
Ivory Coast	3			Y			Y							3
Egypt		3	w/o	1	Y	1		Y	Y					7
Gambia													Y	1
Ghana		4	3					3	Y	1	Y	Y	Y	8
Guinea		2				4			2					3
Kenya				2										1
Libya			dq											1
Madagascar	Y			Y										2
Malawi			4	3										2
Mali	2		Y		Y		Y					4		5
Mauritius					Y	Y	Y							3
Morocco												Y		1
Mozambique										Y				1
Nigeria		1	2		3	3		2			3	2	Y	8
Senegal				Y				Y		4	1	3	Y	6
South Africa	banned				b		3	Y	Y	2		Y		5
South Sudan													Y	1
Sudan											Y			1
Tanzania		Y												1
Togo	Y													1
Tunisia				Y	2				3				Y	4
Uganda	Y				Y		4			Y			Y	5
Zambia						Y	2	4	4					4
Zimbabwe					4	2					Y			3
Total nations (31)	8	8	8	8	8	8	8	8	8	6	7	8	9	

== Women's tournament ==
=== Summaries ===
Ed.	Year	Host	Final			Third Place Match		
Ed.	Year	Host	Gold Medal	Score	Silver Medal	Bronze Medal	Score	Fourth Place
Senior Teams
1	2003	Abuja, Nigeria	Nigeria	1–0	South Africa	Cameroon	1–0	Mali
2	2007	Algiers, Algeria	Nigeria	4–0	South Africa	Ghana	3–1	Algeria
3	2011	Maputo, Mozambique	Cameroon	1–0	Ghana	Algeria	3–0	South Africa
4	2015	Brazzaville, Congo	Ghana	1–0	Cameroon	Ivory Coast	2–1	Nigeria
U20 Teams
5	2019	Rabat, Morocco	Nigeria	0–0 (3–2 p)	Cameroon	Morocco	2–1	Algeria
6	2023	Accra, Ghana	Ghana	2–1	Nigeria	Uganda	0–0 (6–5 p)	Senegal

- Teams for Under-20 since the 2019 edition.

=== Performances by countries for women ===
Team	Gold medals	Silver medals	Bronze medals	Fourth place
Nigeria	3 (2003, 2007, 2019)	1 (2023)		1 (2015)
Ghana	2 (2015, 2023)	1 (2011)	1 (2007)	
Cameroon	1 (2011)	2 (2015, 2019)	1 (2003)	
South Africa		2 (2003, 2007)		1 (2011)
Algeria			1 (2011)	2 (2007, 2019)
Uganda			1 (2023)	
Ivory Coast			1 (2015)	
Morocco			1 (2019)	
Senegal				1 (2023)
Mali				1 (2003)

=== Top scorers ===
Year	Top scorer(s)	Goals
2015	(Nigeria) Desire Oparanozie	5
2019		
2023	(Ghana) Tracey Twum	3

=== Winning coaches ===
2003	Nigeria	(Nigeria) Ntiero Effiom
2007	Nigeria	(Nigeria) Joseph Ladipo
2011	Cameroon	(Cameroon) Carl Enow
2015	Ghana	(Ghana) Yusif Basigi
2019	Nigeria	(Nigeria) Christopher Danjuma
2023	Ghana	(Ghana) Yusif Basigi

=== Participating nations ===
Numbers refer to the final placing of each team at the respective Games.

Nation	03	07	11	15	19	23	Years
Algeria	Y	4	3		4		4
Cameroon	3		1	2	2	Y	5
Congo				Y			1
DR Congo	Y						1
Equatorial Guinea					Y		1
Ethiopia	Y	Y				Y	3
Ghana		3	2	1		Y	4
Guinea			Y				1
Ivory Coast				3			1
Mali	4				Y		2
Morocco					3	Y	2
Mozambique			Y				1
Nigeria	1	1		4	1	Y	5
Senegal		Y				Y	2
South Africa	2	2	4	Y	Y		5
Tanzania			Y	Y		Y	3
Uganda						Y	1
Zambia					Y		1
Zimbabwe	Y		Y				2
Total nations (19)	8	6	8	7	8	8	

== Medal table ==
=== Overall ===
Rank	Nation	Gold	Silver	Bronze	Total
1	Cameroon (CMR)	5	2	2	9
2	Nigeria (NGR)	4	3	3	10
3	Ghana (GHA)	4	1	3	8
4	Egypt (EGY)	2	0	1	3
5	Burkina Faso (BUR)	1	1	0	2
6	Algeria (ALG)	1	0	1	2
6	Senegal (SEN)	1	0	1	2
8	Republic of the Congo (CGO)	1	0	0	1
9	South Africa (RSA)	0	3	1	4
10	Guinea (GUI)	0	2	0	2
11	Tunisia (TUN)	0	1	1	2
12	Kenya (KEN)	0	1	0	1
12	Mali (MLI)	0	1	0	1
12	Zambia (ZAM)	0	1	0	1
12	Zimbabwe (ZIM)	0	1	0	1
16	Ivory Coast (CIV)	0	0	2	2
17	Malawi (MAW)	0	0	1	1
17	Morocco (MAR)	0	0	1	1
Totals (18 entries)		19	17	17	53

=== Men ===
Rank	Nation	Gold	Silver	Bronze	Total
1	Cameroon	4	0	1	5
2	Ghana	2	0	2	4
3	Egypt	2	0	1	3
4	Nigeria	1	4	3	8
5	Burkina Faso	1	1	0	2
6	Senegal	1	0	1	2
7	Algeria	1	0	0	1
7	Congo	1	0	0	1
9	Guinea	0	2	0	2
10	South Africa	0	1	1	2
10	Tunisia	0	1	1	2
12	Kenya	0	1	0	1
12	Mali	0	1	0	1
12	Zambia	0	1	0	1
12	Zimbabwe	0	1	0	1
16	Ivory Coast	0	0	1	1
16	Malawi	0	0	1	1
Totals (17 entries)		13	13	12	38

=== Women ===
Rank	Nation	Gold	Silver	Bronze	Total
1	Nigeria	3	0	1	4
2	Ghana	2	1	1	4
3	Cameroon	1	2	1	4
4	South Africa	0	2	0	2
5	Algeria	0	0	1	1
5	Ivory Coast	0	0	1	1
5	Morocco	0	0	1	1
Totals (7 entries)		6	5	6	17
