= Football at the 2003 All-Africa Games =

2003 All-Africa Games football tournament
Tournament details
- Host country: Nigeria
- City: Abuja
- Dates: 3–16 October 2003
- Teams: 16 (8 m + 8 w) (from 1 confederation)
- Venue(s): 3 (in 3 host cities)

Final positions
- Champions: Cameroon (men); Nigeria (women)
- Runners-up: Nigeria (men); South Africa (women)
- Third place: Ghana (men); Cameroon (women)

Tournament statistics
- Matches played: 32
- Goals scored: 94 (2.94 per match)

The 2003 All-Africa Games football tournament was held in Abuja, Nigeria between 3–16 October 2003 as part of the 2003 All-Africa Games and featured both a men's and women's African Games football tournament. Both tournaments featured eight (8) teams. In Men's play, Cameroon became the first nation to win this tournament three times. The Women's tournament was the first-ever for the Games.

== Medal summary ==
=== Results ===
Event	Gold	Silver	Bronze
Men	Cameroon	Nigeria	Ghana
Women	Nigeria	South Africa	Cameroon

=== Medal table ===
Rank	Nation	Gold	Silver	Bronze	Total
1	Nigeria	1	1	0	2
2	Cameroon	1	0	1	2
3	South Africa	0	1	0	1
4	Ghana	0	0	1	1
Totals (4 entries)		2	2	2	6
