= Football at the 2007 All-Africa Games =

2007 All-Africa Games football tournament
Tournament details
- Host country: Algeria
- City: Algiers
- Dates: 10–23 July 2007
- Teams: 14 (8m + 6w) (from 1 confederation)
- Venue: 5 (in 5 host cities)

Final positions
- Champions: Cameroon (men); Nigeria (women)
- Runners-up: Guinea (men); South Africa (women)
- Third place: Tunisia (men); Ghana (women)

Tournament statistics
- Matches played: 26
- Goals scored: 71 (2.73 per match)

The 2007 All-Africa Games football tournament was held in Algiers, Algeria between 10–23 July 2007 as part of the 2007 All-Africa Games and featured both a men's and women's African Games football tournament. The men's tournament featured eight teams, the women's six. The women's Final match was played on July 22, 2007; the men's on July 23, 2007.

== Medal summary ==
=== Results ===
Event	Gold	Silver	Bronze
Men	Cameroon	Guinea	Tunisia
Women	Nigeria	South Africa	Ghana

=== Medal table ===
Rank	Nation	Gold	Silver	Bronze	Total
1	Cameroon (CMR)	1	0	0	1
1	Nigeria (NGR)	1	0	0	1
3	Guinea (GUI)	0	1	0	1
3	South Africa (RSA)	0	1	0	1
5	Ghana (GHA)	0	0	1	1
5	Tunisia (TUN)	0	0	1	1
Totals (6 entries)		2	2	2	6
