= Zambia national under-23 football team =

National association football team

Zambia Under 23
- Nickname: Junior Chipolopolo
- Association: FAZ
- Confederation: CAF (Africa)
- Head coach: (Zambia) Oswald Mutapa
- Captain: n/a
- FIFA code: ZAM
| First colours | Second colours |

First international
- Zambia 2–2 Iraq (Daejeon, South Korea; 17 September 1988)

Biggest win
- Zambia 4–0 Guatemala (Gwangju, South Korea; 21 September 1988)

Biggest defeat
- Zambia 0–4 Germany (Gwangju, South Korea; 25 September 1988)

Olympic Games
- Appearances: 1 (first in 1988)
- Best result: Quarter-finals (1988)

Africa U-23 Cup of Nations
- Appearances: 2 (first in 2015)
- Best result: Group stage (2015, 2019)

African Games
- Appearances: 4 (first in 1995)
- Best result: (silver) Silver Medal (1999)

The Zambia national U-23 football team is the U-23 football team for Zambia founded in 1929. The team, also known as the Youth Chipolpolo, represents the country in international under-23 matches and is controlled by the Football Association of Zambia.

== Current squad ==
- The following players were called up for the 2023 Africa U-23 Cup of Nations qualification matches.
- Match dates: 22 and 29 October 2022
- Opposition: Sierra Leone
- Caps and goals correct as of: 21 October 2022

| No. | Pos. | Player | Date of birth (age) | Caps | Goals | Club |
|---|---|---|---|---|---|---|
| | GK | Francis Mwansa | Unknown | 0 | 0 | (Football Association of Zambia) Trident |
| | GK | Jeban Tembo | Unknown | 0 | 0 | (Football Association of Zambia) Red Arrows |
| | DF | Mathews Chabala | Unknown | 0 | 0 | (Football Association of Zambia) Nchanga Rangers |
| | DF | Emmanuel Chembe | Unknown | 0 | 0 | (Football Association of Zambia) Nchanga Rangers |
| | DF | John Chishimba | 19 July 2002 (age 24) | 0 | 0 | (Football Association of Zambia) ZESCO United |
| | DF | Brian Musema | Unknown | 0 | 0 | (Football Association of Zambia) Jumulo |
| | DF | Chikondi Njobvu | Unknown | 0 | 0 | (Football Association of Zambia) Green Eagles |
| | MF | Wilson Chisala | Unknown | 0 | 0 | (Football Association of Zambia) Zanaco |
| | MF | Christopher Katongo | Unknown | 0 | 0 | (Football Association of Zambia) Kansansi Dynamos |
| | MF | Luwawa Kasoma | Unknown | 0 | 0 | (Football Association of Zambia) ZESCO United |
| | MF | John Kosamu | Unknown | 0 | 0 | (Football Association of Zambia) Green Buffaloes |
| | MF | Golden Mashata | Unknown | 0 | 0 | (Football Association of Zambia) Green Buffaloes |
| | MF | Muma Mumba | Unknown | 0 | 0 | (Football Association of Zambia) Kafue Eagles |
| | FW | Patrick Gondwe | 5 June 2002 (age 24) | 0 | 0 | (Football Association of Zambia) Nkana |
| | FW | Jimmy Mukeya | 23 February 2002 (age 24) | 0 | 0 | (Football Association of Zambia) Napsa Stars |
| | FW | Joshua Mutale | 14 January 2002 (age 24) | 0 | 0 | (Football Association of Zambia) Power Dynamos |
| | FW | Andrew Phiri | Unknown | 0 | 0 | (Football Association of Zambia) MUZA |
| | FW | Enock Sakala | 23 May 2002 (age 24) | 0 | 0 | (Football Association of Zambia) ZESCO United |

== Recent results & fixtures ==
The following is a list of match results from the previous 12 months, as well as any future matches that have been scheduled.

Win Draw Loss

== Competitive records ==
=== Olympic Games ===
Summer Olympics record
| Hosts/Year | Result | GP | W | D* | L | GS | GA |
|---|---|---|---|---|---|---|---|
| (South Korea) 1988 | Quarter finals | 4 | 2 | 1 | 1 | 10 | 6 |
| (Spain) 1992 | Did not qualify | - | - | - | - | - | - |
| (United States) 1996 | Did not qualify | - | - | - | - | - | - |
| (Australia) 2000 | Did not qualify | - | - | - | - | - | - |
| (Greece) 2004 | Did not qualify | - | - | - | - | - | - |
| (China) 2008 | Did not qualify | - | - | - | - | - | - |
| (United Kingdom) 2012 | Did not qualify | - | - | - | - | - | - |
| (Brazil) 2016 | Did not qualify | - | - | - | - | - | - |
| (Japan) 2020 | Did not qualify | - | - | - | - | - | - |
| Total | 1/32 | 4 | 2 | 1 | 1 | 10 | 6 |

- Prior to the 1992 Olympic Games campaign, the Olympic football tournament was open to full senior national teams.

=== Africa U-23 Cup of Nations ===
Africa U-23 Cup of Nations record
| Hosts/Year | Result | GP | W | D* | L | GS | GA |
|---|---|---|---|---|---|---|---|
| (Morocco) 2011 | Did not qualify | - | - | - | - | - | - |
| (Senegal) 2015 | Group stage | 5 | 2 | 1 | 2 | 5 | 7 |
| (Egypt) 2019 | Group stage | 5 | 1 | 3 | 1 | 3 | 5 |
| Total | 2/3 | 6 | 0 | 5 | 1 | 4 | 10 |

=== All Africa Games ===
African Games record
| Hosts/Year | Result | GP | W | D* | L | GS | GA |
|---|---|---|---|---|---|---|---|
| (Republic of the Congo) 1965 | Did not enter | | | | | | |
| (Nigeria) 1973 | Did not enter | | | | | | |
| (Zimbabwe) 1995 | Group stage | 3 | 1 | 1 | 1 | 5 | 4 |
| (South Africa) 1999 | Runners up | 4 | 3 | 0 | 1 | 8 | 2 |
| (Nigeria) 2003 | Semi-finals | 4 | 2 | 0 | 2 | 5 | 6 |
| (Algeria) 2007 | 4th-place | 5 | 1 | 2 | 2 | 6 | 6 |
| (Mozambique) 2011 | Did not qualify | | | | | | |
| (Republic of the Congo) 2015 | Did not qualify | | | | | | |
| (Morocco) 2019 | Did not qualify | | | | | | |
| Total | 4/11 | 16 | 7 | 3 | 6 | 24 | 18 |

*Draws include knockout matches decided by penalty shootout.
