= Egypt national under-23 football team =

Egypt U-23
- Nickname: الفراعنة (The Pharaohs)
- Association: Egyptian Football Association
- Confederation: CAF (Africa)
- Sub-confederation: UNAF (North Africa)
- Head coach: Vacant
- Captain: Moataz Mohamed
- Home stadium: Cairo International Stadium
- FIFA code: EGY
First colours	Second colours

First international
- Sudan 1–2 Egypt (Sudan; 1991)

Biggest win
- Egypt 5–1 United Arab Emirates (Dubai, United Arab Emirates; 27 January 2024)

Biggest defeat
- Morocco 6–0 Egypt (Nantes, France; 8 August 2024)

Olympic Games
- Appearances: 4 (first in 1992)
- Best result: Fourth place (2024 )

Africa U-23 Cup of Nations
- Appearances: 4 (first in 2011)
- Best result: Champions (2019)

African Games
- Appearances: 4 (first in 1991)
- Best result: Gold medalists (1995)

The Egypt national under-23 football team (Arabic: منتخب مصر الأوليمبى), sometimes called the Egypt Olympic Team, nicknamed The Pharaohs (Arabic: الفراعنة), is Egypt's under-23 national football team and is administered by the Egyptian Football Association. The team's main objectives are to qualify and play at the U-23 Africa Cup of Nations and Olympic Games. As of Los Angeles 2028, players need to be born on or after 1 January 2005 to participate but the team may be supplemented with 3 over-age players.

The team has played at the Olympic Games 13 times, with four of these being after the tournament became age capped. They're also the top-medalist at the U-23 African Cup.

== History ==
Egypt has had limited football success since 1992, when the Olympics first became locked for U-23 players. Egypt qualified to the 2012 Olympics after beating Senegal in the Bronze Metal Match. In the Olympics, they placed second in their group after a loss against Brazil, a draw with New Zealand and a win against Belarus. Their run was abruptly stopped by a 3-0 loss to Japan in the quarterfinals. They missed out on Rio 2016 but reached Tokyo 2020 as African Champions after winning the U-23 tournament at home. They placed second in their group after a nil-nil draw with European Champions Spain, a loss against South American Champions Argentina and a 2-0 win against Australia. They lost 1-0 at the quarterfinals to eventual gold-medalist Brazil.

Egypt qualified for the 2024 tournament after placing second in the 2023 U-23 African Cup. This marks the first time they play in successive tournaments since Tokyo 1964.

== Results and fixtures ==
Legend

Win Draw Lose Fixture

== Players ==
=== Current squad ===
The following players were called up for the friendly matches against Ghana and Congo on 15, 20 June and the 2023 U-23 Africa Cup of Nations between 24 June and 8 July 2023.

No.	Pos.	Player	Date of birth (age)	Club
	GK	Hamza Alaa	1 March 2001 (age 25)	(Egyptian Football Association) Al Ahly
	GK	Ali El Gabry	14 February 2001 (age 25)	(Egyptian Football Association) Ceramica Cleopatra
	GK	Mohamed Seha	1 May 2001 (age 25)	(Egyptian Football Association) Al Mokawloon Al Arab
	DF	Hossam Abdelmaguid	30 April 2001 (age 25)	(Egyptian Football Association) Zamalek
	DF	Mohamed Ashraf	1 October 2001 (age 25)	(Egyptian Football Association) Al Ahly
	DF	Ahmed Eid	1 January 2001 (age 25)	(Egyptian Football Association) ENPPI
	DF	Mohamed El Maghrabi	28 April 2001 (age 25)	(Egyptian Football Association) Smouha
	DF	Hatem Mohamed	26 October 2001 (age 25)	(Egyptian Football Association) Zamalek
	DF	Mohamed Samir	1 January 2001 (age 25)	(Egyptian Football Association) Tala'ea El Gaish
	DF	Mohamed Tarek	20 April 2002 (age 24)	(Egyptian Football Association) Zamalek
	DF	Omar Fayed	4 July 2003 (age 23)	(Football Association of Serbia) Novi Pazar
	MF	Ahmed Fawzi	23 May 2002 (age 24)	(Egyptian Football Association) Al Mokawloon Al Arab
	MF	Mahmoud Gehad	20 August 2001 (age 25)	(Egyptian Football Association) Pharco
	MF	Ahmed Koka	4 July 2001 (age 25)	(Egyptian Football Association) Al Ahly
	MF	Mahmoud Saber	30 July 2001 (age 25)	(Egyptian Football Association) Pyramids
	MF	Mohamed Shehata	1 January 2001 (age 25)	(Egyptian Football Association) Zamalek
	MF	Ali Zazaa	23 June 2001 (age 25)	(Egyptian Football Association) Future
	FW	Ibrahim Adel	23 April 2001 (age 25)	(Egyptian Football Association) Pyramids
	FW	Abdelrahman Atef	4 June 2001 (age 25)	(Egyptian Football Association) Ghazl El Mahalla
	FW	Ahmed Atef	19 December 2002 (age 23)	(Egyptian Football Association) Al Mokawloon Al Arab
	FW	Osama Faisal	1 January 2001 (age 25)	(Egyptian Football Association) National Bank of Egypt
	FW	Emad Mayhoub	1 January 2001 (age 25)	(Egyptian Football Association) ENPPI
	FW	Mostafa Saad	22 August 2001 (age 25)	(Egyptian Football Association) Smouha

=== Previous squads ===
- 1992 Summer Olympics squad
- 2012 Summer Olympics squad
- 2020 Summer Olympics squad

=== Overage players in Olympic Games ===
Tournament	Player 1	Player 2	Player 3
2012	Ahmed Fathy (DF)	Mohamed Aboutrika (MF)	Emad Moteab (FW)
2020	Mohamed El Shenawy (GK)	Ahmed Hegazi (DF)	Mahmoud Hamdy (DF)
2024	Mohamed Elneny (MF)	Ahmed Sayed Zizo (FW)	

== Competitive record ==
=== Olympic Games ===
Summer Olympics record
Year/Host	Round	Pld	W	D	L	GF	GA	Pld	W	D	L	GF	GA
(Spain) Barcelona 1992	First round	3	1	0	2	5	6	6	4	2	0	11	3
(United States) Atlanta 1996	Did not qualify							4	2	1	1	5	4
(Australia) Sydney 2000	Did not qualify							8	4	3	1	15	9
(Greece) Athens 2004	Did not qualify							6	0	0	6	1	13
(China) Beijing 2008	Did not qualify							4	1	2	1	6	4
(United Kingdom) London 2012	Quarter-finals	4	1	1	2	6	8	9	5	1	3	12	6
(Brazil) Rio de Janeiro 2016	Did not qualify							1	1	0	0	4	0
(Japan) Tokyo 2020	Quarter-finals	4	1	1	2	2	2	5	5	0	0	11	4
(France) Paris 2024	Fourth place	6	2	2	2	5	11	5	3	1	1	5	2
Total	4/9	17	5	4	8	18	27	47	24	10	13	70	45

- Prior to the 1992 Olympic Games campaign, the Olympic football tournament was open to full senior national teams.
- Egypt withdrew from the 1956 Football tournament and boycotted the 1980 Olympics after qualifying for both.

=== Africa U-23 Cup of Nations ===
Africa U-23 Cup of Nations record
Appearances: 4
Year/Host	Round	Pld	W	D	L	GF	GA
Morocco 2011	Bronze Medal	5	3	0	2	7	4
Senegal 2015	Group Stage	3	0	2	1	3	4
Egypt 2019	Champions	5	5	0	0	11	4
Morocco 2023	Runners-up	5	3	1	1	5	2
Total	4/4	18	11	3	4	26	14

=== African Games ===
African Games record
Appearances: 7
Year/Host	Round	Pld	W	D	L	GF	GA
(Egypt) Cairo 1991	Fifth Place	4	1	1	2	5	6
(Zimbabwe) Harare 1995	Gold Medal	5	4	0	1	8	3
(South Africa) Johannesburg 1999	Didn't qualify						
(Nigeria) Abuja 2003	Group Stage	3	0	0	3	2	6
(Algeria) Algiers 2007	Group Stage	3	0	0	3	4	8
(Mozambique) Maputo 2011	Withdrew	-	-	-	-	-	-
(Republic of the Congo) Brazzaville 2015	Withdrew	-	-	-	-	-	-
Total	7/11	28	13	3	12	44	39

- Prior to the Cairo 1991 campaign, the All-Africa Games was open to full senior national teams

== See also ==
- Sport in Egypt
- Football in Egypt
- Egypt national football team
- Egypt national under-20 football team
- Egypt national under-17 football team
- Egypt national futsal team
- Egypt national beach soccer team
