= Mali national under-23 football team =

Mali national football team

Mali U-23
- Nickname: The Eagles
- Association: Malian Football Federation
- Confederation: CAF (Africa)
- Head coach: Alou Badra Diallo
- Home stadium: Stade du 26 Mars
- FIFA code: MLI
First colours	Second colours

First international
- Mali 3–0 Senegal (Dakar, Senegal; March 7, 1964)

Biggest win
- Mali 11–0 Mauritania (Abidjan, Ivory Coast; January 10, 1972)

Biggest defeat
- Algeria 2–0 Mali (M'Bour, Senegal; December 2, 2015); Mali 0–2 Ghana (Cairo, Egypt; November 14, 2019); Senegal 3–1 Mali (Dakar, Senegal; March 22, 2023)

Olympic Games
- Appearances: 2 (first in 2004)
- Best result: Quarter-finals (2004)

U-23 Africa Cup of Nations
- Appearances: 3 (first in 2015)
- Best result: Third place (2023)

All-Africa Games
- Appearances: 4 (first in 1965)
- Best result: Runners-up (1965)

Mali national under-23 football team, represents Mali in association football at an under-23 age level and is controlled by Malian Football Federation, the governing body for football in Mali.

== Current players ==
The following players were called up for the 2023 Africa U-23 Cup of Nations.

No.	Pos.	Player	Date of birth (age)	Club
1	GK	Lassine Diarra	11 November 2002 (age 24)	(French Football Federation) Châteauroux
16	GK	Alkalifa Coulibaly	3 December 2001 (age 24)	(Malian Football Federation) Onze Créateurs
22	GK	Madou Diakité	22 July 2004 (age 22)	(Italian Football Federation) Terracina
2	DF	Fodé Doucouré	3 February 2001 (age 25)	(French Football Federation) Red Star
3	DF	Hamidou Diallo	26 January 2002 (age 24)	(Portuguese Football Federation) Farense
4	DF	Lassine Soumaoro	19 December 2002 (age 23)	(French Football Federation) Troyes
5	DF	Ibrahima Cissé	15 February 2001 (age 25)	(German Football Association) Schalke 04
17	DF	Hamed Diomandé	15 December 2002 (age 23)	(Malian Football Federation) Afrique Football Élite
25	DF	Koly Soumare	22 February 2001 (age 25)	(French Football Federation) Valenciennes
26	DF	Zoumana Coulibaly	4 September 2001 (age 25)	(Malian Football Federation) Afrique Football Élite
6	MF	Mamady Diambou	11 November 2002 (age 24)	(Austrian Football Association) Salzburg
8	MF	Boubacar Traoré	20 August 2001 (age 25)	(The Football Association) Wolverhampton
10	MF	Mamadou Sangaré	26 June 2002 (age 24)	(Austrian Football Association) Hartberg
12	MF	Abdoulaye Bathily	7 August 2002 (age 24)	(French Football Federation) Sète
13	MF	Brahima Diarra	5 July 2003 (age 23)	(The Football Association) Huddersfield
19	MF	Mohamadou Lamine Bah	23 October 2001 (age 25)	(Tunisian Football Federation) Olympique Béja
21	MF	Coli Saco	15 May 2002 (age 24)	(Italian Football Federation) Pro Vercelli
9	FW	Cheickna Doumbia	14 June 2003 (age 23)	(United Arab Emirates Football Association) Shabab Al-Ahli
11	FW	Issoufi Maïga	12 February 2002 (age 24)	(Portuguese Football Federation) Académico
14	FW	Ladji Mallé	12 November 2001 (age 25)	(United States Soccer Federation) Los Angeles FC
18	FW	Cheickna Diakité	25 December 2004 (age 21)	(Malian Football Federation) Real Bamako
20	FW	Alhassane Tamboura	29 June 2001 (age 25)	(United Arab Emirates Football Association) Al-Dhaid
24	FW	Mohamed Guindo	1 August 2003 (age 23)	(Italian Football Federation) Pro Vercelli

== Fixtures and results ==
legend

Win Draw Loss Fixture

== Competition records ==
=== Olympic Games ===
Summer Olympic Games record
Year	Result	Position	Pld	W	D	L	GF	GA
(Spain) 1992 to (Australia) 2000	Did not qualify							
(Greece) 2004	Quarter-finals	5th	4	1	2	1	5	4
(China) 2008 to (Japan) 2020	Did not qualify							
(France) 2024	Group stage	14th	3	0	1	2	1	3
Total	Quarter-finals	2/20	7	1	3	3	6	7

=== U-23 Africa Cup of Nations ===
U-23 Africa Cup of Nations record
Year	Round	Position	Pld	W	D	L	GF	GA
(Morocco) 2011	Did not qualify							
(Senegal) 2015	Group stage	5th	3	1	0	2	3	5
(Egypt) 2019	Group stage	8th	3	0	0	3	0	4
(Morocco) 2023	Third place	3rd	5	2	2	1	7	4
Total	3/4	Third place	11	3	2	6	10	13

=== All Africa Games ===
African Games record
Year	Result	Pld	W	D*	L	GF	GA
(Republic of the Congo) 1965	Runners-up	5	3	1	1	10	5
(Nigeria) 1973	Did not qualify						
(Algeria) 1978	Group stage	3	0	2	1	3	5
(Kenya) 1987	Did not qualify						
(Egypt) 1991	Group stage	4	1	2	1	6	2
(Zimbabwe) 1995	Did not qualify						
(South Africa) 1999	Group stage	4	2	0	2	8	6
(Nigeria) 2003 to (Republic of the Congo) 2015	Did not qualify						
(Morocco) 2019 to (Ghana) 2023	Under-20 tournament						
Total	4/11	16	6	5	5	27	18

*Draws include knockout matches decided via penalty shoot-out.
