= Nigeria national under-23 football team =

National association football team

Nigeria U-23
- Nickname: Dream Team VII or Olympic Eagles
- Association: Nigeria Football Federation
- Other affiliation: Nigeria Olympic Committee
- Confederation: CAF (Africa)
- Sub-confederation: WAFU (West Africa)
- Head coach: Eric Chelle
- Captain: Azubuike Okechukwu
- Top scorer: Junior Ajayi (10)
- Home stadium: Stephen Keshi Stadium
- FIFA code: NGA
First colours	Second colours

Olympic Games
- Appearances: 6 (first in 1968)
- Best result: Gold Medal (1996)

AFCON U-23
- Appearances: 3 (first in 2011)
- Best result: Champions (2015)

African Games
- Appearances: 4 (first in 1973)
- Best result: Gold Medal (1973)
Medal record
Olympic Games
Gold medal – first place	1996 Atlanta	Team
Silver medal – second place	2008 Beijing	Team
Bronze medal – third place	2016 Rio de Janeiro	Team
Africa Cup of Nations
Gold medal – first place	2015 Senegal

Nigeria national under-23 football team represents Nigeria in international football competitions in Olympic Games. The selection is limited to male players under the age of 23, except during the Olympic Games where the use of three overage players is allowed. The team is controlled by the Nigeria Football Federation. In four appearances at the Olympic Games, the team has won gold in 1996, silver in 2008 and bronze in 2016.

== Competitive record ==
=== Olympic Games record ===
Olympic Games
Appearances: 4
Year	Round	Position	Pld	W	D	L	GF	GA
Until 1988	See Nigeria national football team							
(Spain) 1992	did not qualify							
(United States) 1996	Gold Medal	1st	6	5	0	1	12	6
(Australia) 2000	Quarter-finals	8th	4	1	2	1	8	10
(Greece) 2004	did not qualify							
(China) 2008	Silver Medal	2nd	6	4	1	1	10	4
(United Kingdom) 2012	did not qualify							
(Brazil) 2016	Bronze Medal	3rd	6	4	0	2	11	10
(Japan) 2020	did not qualify							
(France) 2024	did not qualify							
Total	Gold Medal	4/8	22	14	3	5	41	30

- Prior to the Barcelona 1992 campaign, the Football at the Summer Olympics was open to full senior national teams.

=== African Games record ===
African Games
Year	Round	Position	Pld	W	D	L	GF	GA
(Egypt) 1991	Bronze Medal	3rd	5	4	0	1	14	3
(Zimbabwe) 1995	Bronze Medal	3rd	5	2	1	2	5	3
(South Africa) 1999	did not qualify							
(Nigeria) 2003	Silver Medal	2nd	5	4	0	1	10	2
(Algeria) 2007	did not qualify							
(Mozambique) 2011	did not qualify							
(Republic of the Congo) 2015	Bronze Medal	3rd	4	1	2	1	4	4
(Morocco) 2019	See Nigeria national under-20 football team							
Total	Gold Medal	4/7	19	11	3	5	33	'12

- Prior to the 1991 All-Africa Games campaign, the football tournament was open to full senior national teams.
- 2019 edition of the football tournament was played by the U-20 team.

=== U-23 Africa Cup of Nations record ===
U-23 Africa Cup of Nations
Appearances: 2
Year	Round	Position	Pld	W	D	L	GF	GA
(Morocco) 2011	Group stage	6th	3	1	0	2	5	4
(Senegal) 2015	Champions	1st	5	3	2	0	8	5
(Egypt) 2019	Group stage	6th	3	1	1	1	3	2
(Morocco) 2023	did not qualify							
Total	Champions	1/3	11	5	3	3	16	11

== Team honours and achievements ==
Intercontinental

- Football at the Summer Olympics
  - Gold Medal: 1996
  - Silver Medal: 2008
  - Bronze Medal: 2016

Continental

- U-23 Africa Cup of Nations
  - Winners: 2015
- Football at the African Games
  - Silver Medal: 2003
  - Bronze Medal: 1991, 1995, 2015,

Other

- Inter Continental Cup
  - Winners: 2008
- Niger Tournament
  - Winners: 2002
- TIFOCO Tournament
  - Third-place: 2003

== Players ==
=== Current squad ===
Squad for the 2023 Africa U-23 Cup of Nations qualifiers vs. Guinea

No.	Pos.	Player	Date of birth (age)	Club
	GK	John Amah		(Nigeria Football Federation) Sunshine Stars F.C.
	GK	Nurudeen Badmus		(Nigeria Football Federation) Dakkada
	GK	Ifeanyi Nchekwube		(Nigeria Football Federation) Akwa United
	GK	Oriya Joseph		(Nigeria Football Federation) Lobi Stars F.C.
	DF	Christopher Nwaeze		(Ukrainian Association of Football) Zorya Luhansk
	DF	Desmond Ojietefian		(Nigeria Football Federation) Shooting Stars
	DF	Okechukwu Chikason		(Nigeria Football Federation) Enyimba F.C.
	DF	Anthony Anieke		(Nigeria Football Federation) Akwa United
	DF	Samuel Olamilekan		(Nigeria Football Federation) Niger Tornadoes
	DF	Benjamin Tanimu		(Nigeria Football Federation) Bendel Insurance
	DF	Evans Ogbonda	3 November 2002 (age 24)	(Nigeria Football Federation) Port Harcourt City
	DF	Umar Ahmed Farouk		(Nigeria Football Federation) Gombe United
	MF	Daniel Wotlai		(Nigeria Football Federation) Abia Warriors
	MF	Akanni Qudus		(Nigeria Football Federation) Remo Stars
	MF	Auwalu Naziru		(Nigeria Football Federation) Enugu Rangers
	MF	Chibuike Nwaiwu		(Nigeria Football Federation) Enyimba F.C.
	MF	Divine Nwachukwu		(Nigeria Football Federation) Bendel Insurance
	MF	Taofeek Malomo		(Nigeria Football Federation) Shooting Stars
	MF	Samuel Chisom		(Nigeria Football Federation) Kwara United
	MF	Samaila Sarki		(Nigeria Football Federation) Bendel Insurance
	MF	Kumaga Suur		(Nigeria Football Federation) Lobi Stars F.C.
	MF	Inye Green		(Nigeria Football Federation) Ibani United
	FW	Munir Idris		(Nigeria Football Federation) Niger Tornadoes
	FW	Ahmed Jimoh		(Nigeria Football Federation) Kwara United
	FW	Ezekiel Edidiong	10 August 2001 (age 25)	(Nigeria Football Federation) Remo Stars
	FW	Ifeanyi Ogba		(Nigeria Football Federation) Akwa United
	FW	Umar Ibrahim		(Nigeria Football Federation) El-Kanemi Warriors
	FW	Alkasin Deji Yusuf		(Nigeria Football Federation) Dakkada
	FW	Mojereola Suleiman		(Nigeria Football Federation) Sunshine Stars F.C.
	FW	Akile Monday		(Nigeria Football Federation) Lobi Stars F.C.

=== Overage players in Olympic Games ===
Tournament	Player 1	Player 2	Player 3
1996	Uche Okechukwu (DF)	Emmanuel Amunike (MF)	Daniel Amokachi (FW)
2000	Godwin Okpara (DF)	Garba Lawal (MF)	did not select
2008	Peter Odemwingie (FW)	did not select	
2016	Daniel Akpeyi (GK)	Mikel John Obi (MF)	did not select
