= Congo national under-23 football team =

National association football team

Congo Olympic football team (U-23)
- Nickname(s): Les Diables Rouges (The Red Devils)
- Association: Fédération Congolaise de Football (FECOFOOT)
- Confederation: CAF (Africa)
- Sub-confederation: UNIFFAC (Central Africa)
- Head coach: Cyril Ndonga
- Captain: Borel Tomandzoto
- Home stadium: Stade Municipal de Kintélé; Stade Alphonse Massemba-Débat
- FIFA code: CGO
First colours	Second colours

U-23 Africa Cup of Nations
- Appearances: 1 (first in 2023)
- Best result: Group stage (2023)

The Congo Olympic football team represents Republic of the Congo (RotC) in international football competitions in Olympic Games. The selection is limited to players under the age of 23, except three overage players. The team is controlled by the Congolese Football Federation.

== History ==
The team was founded in 1991 with their participation in the 1992 Summer Olympics qualifying. The team played in the inaugural U-23 Africa Cup of Nations in 2011 with the goal of participating in the newly established CAF competition, the U-23 Africa Cup of Nations. In their inaugural participation, the team faced a tough challenge in the first qualifying round against Uganda. However, they exhibited resilience and determination, ultimately securing qualification through a penalty shootout. Subsequently, the team experienced a period of relative quiet, but in 2023, they achieved a significant milestone by qualifying for the 2023 U-23 Africa Cup of Nations in Morocco. Their journey to this prestigious event included a noteworthy victory over South Africa in the third round of the tournament. Upon reaching the 2023 U-23 Africa Cup of Nations, they were placed in Group A alongside the host nation, Morocco, as well as Guinea and Ghana. Although they finished fourth in the group stage, this experience provided them with valuable lessons. Their matches included a thrilling 3-2 loss to Ghana in the first game, a competitive 3-1 defeat against Guinea in the second game, and a hard-fought 1-0 loss to the Atlas Lions of Morocco in their final match.

== Competitive record ==
=== Africa U-23 Cup of Nations record ===
U-23 Africa Cup of Nations
Appearances: 1
Year	Round	Position	Pld	W	D	L	GF	GA
(Morocco) 2011	did not qualify							
(Senegal) 2015	did not qualify							
(Egypt) 2019	did not qualify							
(Morocco) 2023	Group Stage	7th	3	0	0	3	3	7
Total	Group Stage	1/4	3	0	0	3	3	7
