= Cameroon national under-23 football team =

Football team representing Cameroon

Cameroon U-23
- Nickname(s): Les Lions Indomptables (The Indomitable Lions)
- Association: Cameroonian Football Federation
- Confederation: CAF (Africa)
- Sub-confederation: UNIFFAC (Central Africa)
- Home stadium: Stade Ahmadou Ahidjo
- FIFA code: CMR
First colours	Second colours

Olympic Games
- Appearances: 2 (first in 2000)
- Best result: Champions (2000)

African Games
- Appearances: 6 (first in 1978)
- Best result: Champions (1991, 1999, 2003, 2007)

Africa U-23 Cup of Nations
- Appearances: 1 (first in 2019)
- Best result: Group Stage (2019)

Olympic medal record

Men's Football
Gold medal – first place	2000 Sydney	Team

Cameroon national under-23 football team, also known as the Indomitable Lions (Les Lions Indomptables), (Note: Most of the national sporting teams in Cameroon go by this name, including the Cameroon national rugby league team.) represents Cameroon in international football competitions in Olympic Games. The selection is limited to players under the age of 23, except during the Olympic Games where the use of three overage players is allowed. The team is controlled by the Cameroonian Football Federation.

== Players ==
=== Current squad ===
- The following players were called up for the 2023 Africa U-23 Cup of Nations qualification matches.
- Match dates: 25 and 28 March 2023
- Opposition: Gabon

No.	Pos.	Player	Date of birth (age)	Caps	Goals	Club
	GK	Maurice Tchuisseu	9 July 2001 (age 25)	0	0	(French Football Federation) Caennaise
	GK	Vincent Fotsing	12 April 2003 (age 23)	0	0	(French Football Federation) Marseille
	DF	François Tchuenkam	26 January 2004 (age 22)	0	0	(French Football Federation) Toulouse
	DF	Jacques Nkouonlack	20 August 2001 (age 25)	0	0	(Royal Spanish Football Federation) Deportivo Alavés
	DF	Guillaume Nkouam	10 February 2001 (age 25)	0	0	(French Football Federation) Red Star
	DF	Adrien Nkonda	23 May 2002 (age 24)	0	0	(French Football Federation) Saint-Étienne
	MF	Gaël Nkembe	17 November 2001 (age 24)	0	0	(South African Football Association) Cape Town City
	MF	Jules Tchakounte	31 January 2001 (age 25)	0	0	(French Football Federation) Troyes
	MF	Théophile Toukam	18 August 2002 (age 24)	0	0	(Royal Spanish Football Federation) Poblense
	MF	Régis Njiokam	14 October 2003 (age 23)	0	0	(Royal Spanish Football Federation) Cádiz
	MF	Alexandre Mpondo	16 June 2004 (age 22)	0	0	(French Football Federation) Marseille
	MF	Lucien Djeukam	2 February 2002 (age 24)	0	0	(Royal Belgian Football Association) Seraing
	MF	Pascal Ndoumbe	11 November 2002 (age 24)	0	0	(Latvian Football Federation) Daugavpils
	FW	Laurent Ntangsi	22 December 2001 (age 24)	0	0	(Royal Spanish Football Federation) Real Valladolid
	FW	Patrice Nguetsa	14 May 2001 (age 25)	0	0	(Royal Moroccan Football Federation) FUS Rabat
	FW	Didier Mvele	14 September 2001 (age 25)	0	0	(Royal Belgian Football Association) Charleroi
	FW	Gilles Njume	7 October 2001 (age 25)	0	0	(Turkish Football Federation) Tuzlaspor

=== Recent call-ups ===
The following players have also received a call-up to the Cameroon under-23 squad within the last twelve months and remain eligible for selection.

Pos.	Player	Date of birth (age)	Caps	Goals	Club	Latest call-up

=== Overage players in Olympic Games ===
Tournament	Player 1	Player 2	Player 3
2000	Serge Mimpo (DF)	Patrick Mboma (FW)	
2008	Antonio Ghomsi (DF)	Gustave Bebbe (FW)	

== Honours ==
- Summer Olympic Games
  - Gold Medal: 2000
- African Games
  - Gold Medal: 1991, 1999, 2003, 2007
  - Bronze Medal: 2011
