= Senegal national under-23 football team =

Senegal Under-23
- Nickname(s): Les Lionceaux de la Teranga (Cubs of Teranga)
- Association: Senegalese Football Federation
- Confederation: CAF (Africa)
- Head coach: Serigne Saliou Dia
- Captain: Pape Seydou Ndiaye
| First colours | Second colours |

First international
- Nigeria 1–2 Senegal (1972 Olympic qualifier)

Biggest win
- Senegal 2 - 0 Uruguay (London; Great Britain 29 July 2012)

Biggest defeat
- Tunisia 3–1 Senegal (1992 Olympic qualifier); Mexico 4–2 Senegal (2012 Summer Olympics)

Summer Olympics
- Appearances: 1 (first in 2012)
- Best result: Quarter-finals (2012)

The Senegal national under-23 football team (also known as Senegal Olympic, Senegal U-23) represents Senegal in international football competitions in the Olympic Games and the CAF U-23 Championship. The selection is limited to players under the age of 23 but the Olympics allows for the addition of up to three overage players. The team is controlled by the Senegalese Football Federation. Senegal made its first appearance in football at the 2012 Olympics in London.

== Competitive Record ==
=== CAF U-23 Championship ===
CAF U-23 Championship Record
| Year | Round | Position | GP | W | D | L | GS | GA |
|---|---|---|---|---|---|---|---|---|
| (Morocco) 2011 | Fourth Place | 4 | 5 | 2 | 0 | 3 | 3 | 5 |
| Total | 1/1 | - | 5 | 2 | 0 | 3 | 3 | 5 |

=== Olympic Games ===
| Host nation / Year | Result | GP | W | D* | L | GS | GA |
|---|---|---|---|---|---|---|---|
| (Greece) 1896 | No football tournament was held |
| (France) 1900 | did not enter |
| (United States) 1904 | did not enter |
| (United Kingdom) 1908 | did not enter |
| (Sweden) 1912 | did not enter |
| (Belgium) 1920 | did not enter |
| (France) 1924 | did not enter |
| (Netherlands) 1928 | did not enter |
| (United States) 1932 | No football tournament was held |
| (Nazi Germany) 1936 | did not enter |
| (United Kingdom) 1948 | did not enter |
| (Finland) 1952 | did not enter |
| (Australia) 1956 | did not enter |
| (Italy) 1960 | did not enter |
| (Japan) 1964 | did not enter |
| (Mexico) 1968 | did not enter |
| (West Germany) 1972 | did not qualify |
| (Canada) 1976 | did not qualify |
| (Soviet Union) 1980 | did not qualify |
| (United States) 1984 | did not qualify |
| (South Korea) 1988 | did not qualify |
| (Spain) 1992 | did not qualify |
| (United States) 1996 | did not qualify |
| (Australia) 2000 | did not qualify |
| (Greece) 2004 | did not qualify |
| (China) 2008 | did not qualify |
| (United Kingdom) 2012 | Quarter-finals | 4 | 1 | 2 | 1 | 6 | 6 |
| (Brazil) 2016 | did not qualify |
| (Japan) 2020 | did not qualify |
| (France) 2024 | did not qualify |
| Total | 1/27 | 4 | 1 | 2 | 1 | 6 | 6 |

*Denotes draws including knockout matches decided on penalty kicks.

== Squad ==
=== Current squad ===
- The following players were called up for the 2023 Africa U-23 Cup of Nations qualification matches.
- Match dates: 22 and 28 March 2023
- Opposition: Mali

| No. | Pos. | Player | Date of birth (age) | Caps | Goals | Club |
|---|---|---|---|---|---|---|
| | GK | Ousmane Ba | 6 June 2002 (age 24) | 2 | 0 | (French Football Federation) Metz |
| | GK | Massamba Ndiaye | 8 October 2001 (age 25) | 1 | 0 | (French Football Federation) Pau |
| | GK | Landing Badji | 21 September 2003 (age 23) | 0 | 0 | (Senegalese Football Federation) Pikine |
| | DF | Amadou Salif Mbengue | 5 January 2002 (age 24) | 2 | 0 | (The Football Association) Reading |
| | DF | Moussa N'Diaye | 18 June 2002 (age 24) | 2 | 0 | (Royal Belgian Football Association) Anderlecht |
| | DF | Abdoulaye Ndiaye | 10 April 2002 (age 24) | 1 | 0 | (French Football Federation) Bastia |
| | DF | Birame Diaw | 1 May 2003 (age 23) | 0 | 0 | (Royal Belgian Football Association) Standard Liège |
| | DF | Alpha Diounkou | 10 October 2001 (age 25) | 0 | 0 | (Royal Spanish Football Federation) Barcelona |
| | DF | Mamadou Mbacke | 21 November 2002 (age 23) | 0 | 0 | (Royal Spanish Football Federation) Villarreal |
| | DF | Cheikhou Ndiaye | 25 January 2002 (age 24) | 0 | 0 | (Senegalese Football Federation) Génération Foot |
| | DF | Mamadou Sané | 31 December 2004 (age 21) | 0 | 0 | (Senegalese Football Federation) Guédiawaye |
| | DF | Arouna Sangante | 12 April 2002 (age 24) | 0 | 0 | (French Football Federation) Le Havre |
| | MF | Mamadou Lamine Camara | 5 January 2003 (age 23) | 2 | 0 | (Royal Moroccan Football Federation) Berkane |
| | MF | Pape Diop | 4 September 2003 (age 23) | 2 | 0 | (Royal Belgian Football Association) Zulte Waregem |
| | MF | Rassoul Ndiaye | 11 December 2001 (age 24) | 1 | 0 | (French Football Federation) Sochaux |
| | MF | Djibril Diarra | 30 April 2004 (age 22) | 0 | 0 | (Senegalese Football Federation) Génération Foot |
| | MF | Abdou Seydi | 31 December 2001 (age 24) | 0 | 0 | (Tunisian Football Federation) Bizertin |
| | FW | Meleye Diagne | 24 November 2002 (age 23) | 2 | 2 | (Latvian Football Federation) Auda |
| | FW | Ibrahima Dramé | 6 October 2001 (age 25) | 2 | 0 | (Austrian Football Association) Austria Wien |
| | FW | Ousseynou Niang | 12 October 2001 (age 25) | 2 | 0 | (Latvian Football Federation) Riga |
| | FW | Youssouph Badji | 20 December 2001 (age 24) | 0 | 0 | (Royal Belgian Football Association) Charleroi |
| | FW | Paul Bassène | 2 January 2001 (age 25) | 0 | 0 | (Royal Moroccan Football Federation) Oujda |
| | FW | Samba Diallo | 5 January 2003 (age 23) | 0 | 0 | (Ukrainian Association of Football) Dynamo Kyiv |
| | FW | Bassirou N'Diaye | 15 February 2002 (age 24) | 0 | 0 | (French Football Federation) Sochaux |
| | FW | Abdallah Sima | 17 June 2001 (age 25) | 0 | 0 | (French Football Federation) Angers |

=== Recent callups ===
| Pos. | Player | Date of birth (age) | Caps | Goals | Club | Latest call-up |

== See also ==
- Senegal national football team
- Senegal national under-20 football team
