= Football at the 2004 Summer Olympics – Men's African Qualifiers =

2004 Summer Olympics – Men's Football African Qualifiers
- Dates: 8 November 2002 – 28 March 2004

The African Men's Olympic Qualifiers was held to determine the African national teams for under 23 that will participate at the 2004 Summer Olympics football tournament held in Athens.

== Preliminary round ==
Team 1	Agg.	Team 2	1st leg	2nd leg
Seychelles	2–1	Mauritius	1–0	1–1
Malawi	1–3	Rwanda	1–1	0–2
Kenya	15–0	Somalia	11–0	4–0
Swaziland	3–5	Botswana	1–2	2–3
Mozambique	0–1	Lesotho	0–0	0–1
Ethiopia	2–1	Sudan	2–1	0–0
Libya	1–6	Chad	0–4	1–2
Congo	w/o	Central African Republic	—	—
Gambia	w/o	Guinea-Bissau	—	—
Mauritania	w/o	Cape Verde	—	—
Benin	w/o^{1}	Equatorial Guinea	—	—

^1 Both withdrew.

8 November 2002

Seychelles	1–0	Mauritius
Brutus 47'

23 November 2002

Mauritius	1–1	Seychelles
Baldé (pen.)		Brutus

9 November 2002

Malawi	1–1	Rwanda

24 November 2002

Rwanda	2–0	Malawi

9 November 2002

Kenya	11–0	Somalia
Mwalala 5', 29', 46'; Oliech 27', 52', 70'; I. Omondi 72'; Owino 80'; Mohamed 85'; Ogeto 90'; Fordy 90+2'

16 November 2002

Somalia	0–4	Kenya
		Muranda 11'; Owino 14'; Onyango 75'; H. Omondi 86'

10 November 2002

Swaziland	1–2	Botswana

24 November 2002

Botswana	3–2	Swaziland
Mohambi		Goal

10 November 2002

Mozambique	0–0	Lesotho

29 November 2002

Lesotho	1–0	Mozambique

10 November 2002

Ethiopia	2–1	Sudan
Khaled 66' (o.g.); Bekele 90' (pen.)		Noureldin Antar

23 November 2002

Sudan	0–0	Ethiopia

10 November 2002

Liberia	0–4	Chad

24 November 2002

Chad	2–1	Liberia

== First round ==
Team 1	Agg.	Team 2	1st leg	2nd leg
South Africa	2–1	Kenya	2–1	0–0
Algeria	w/o	Chad	5–0	—
Zambia	3–2	Botswana	3–2	0–0
Nigeria	3–1	Namibia	1–0	2–1
Uganda	5–4	Seychelles	3–2	2–2
Zimbabwe	2–3	Ethiopia	2–1	0–2
Cameroon	3–2	Congo	3–1	0–1
Angola	5–2	Lesotho	3–0	2–2
DR Congo	3–0	Rwanda	1–0	2–0
Mali	1–0	Guinea	1–0	0–0
Liberia	0–6	Ghana	0–5	0–1
Morocco	5–3	Gambia	4–0	1–3
Egypt	w/o	Tanzania	—	—
Ivory Coast	w/o	Burkina Faso	—	—
Senegal	w/o	Mauritania	—	—
Tunisia	Bye^{1}			

^1 Tunisia bye after both Benin and Equatorial Guinea withdrew.

7 June 2003

South Africa	2–1	Kenya
Khenyeza 11'; Mngomeni 31'		Malenya 56'

28 June 2003

Kenya	0–0	South Africa

13 June 2003

Algeria	5–0	Chad
Bensaïd 7' (pen.), 8', 12', 53'; Chaïb 68'

19 May Stadium, Annaba
29 June 2003

Chad	w/o	Algeria
Withdrew

14 June 2003

Zambia	3–2	Botswana

29 June 2003

Botswana	0–0	Zambia

14 June 2003

Nigeria	1–0	Namibia
Tykase 4'

MKO Abiola Stadium, Abeokuta
28 June 2003

Namibia	1–2	Nigeria
Toromba 16'		Obodo 6' (pen.); Nwogu 54'

14 June 2003

Uganda	3–2	Seychelles

28 June 2003

Seychelles	2–2	Uganda

15 June 2003

Zimbabwe	2–1	Ethiopia

29 June 2003

Ethiopia	2–0	Zimbabwe

15 June 2003

Cameroon	3–1	Congo
Abada 34'; Mokaké 41'; Bengono 71'		Lokomo 85'

29 June 2003

Congo	1–0	Cameroon

15 June 2003

Angola	3–0	Lesotho
Loló 42'; Chinho 79', 89'

29 June 2003

Lesotho	2–2	Angola
		Mendonça 54'; Chinho

15 June 2003

DR Congo	1–0	Rwanda
Nsumbu 60'

29 June 2003

Rwanda	0–2	DR Congo

15 June 2003

Mali	1–0	Guinea
Traoré 21'

29 June 2003

Guinea	0–0	Mali

25 June 2003

Liberia	0–5	Ghana
		Boateng 4'; Dong-Bortey; Kyere; Kwabena

29 June 2003

Ghana	1–0	Liberia
Kyere 41'

Kumasi Sports Stadium, Kumasi

6 September 2003

Morocco	4–0	Gambia
Bouden 13', 26', 41'; Zairi 47'

Moulay Abdellah Stadium, Rabat
Referee: Mohamed Lamine Benaïssa (Algeria)
9 October 2003

Gambia	3–1	Morocco

== Second round ==
=== Group A ===
Pos	Team	Pld	W	D	L	GF	GA	GD	Pts	Qualification
1	Tunisia	6	3	3	0	8	2	+6	12	2004 Summer Olympics
2	Senegal	6	3	2	1	7	5	+2	11	
3	Nigeria	6	3	1	2	11	7	+4	10	
4	Egypt	6	0	0	6	1	13	−12	0	

25 October 2003

Tunisia	0–0	Senegal

Stade El Menzah, Tunis
26 October 2003

Egypt	0–2	Nigeria
		Akaruye 20'; Babayaro 42'

Cairo

20 December 2003

Nigeria	1–1	Tunisia
Abiodun 15'		Saidi 68'

20 December 2003

Senegal	2–0	Egypt
Ahmed 18' (o.g.); Diarra 82'

3 January 2004

Senegal	4–3	Nigeria
Nwaneri 3' (o.g.); Papa Waigo 6'; Sène 75' (pen.); Bocandé 89'		Opabunmi 14'; Yusuf 25'; Odemwingie 56'

4 January 2004

Egypt	1–3	Tunisia
Riad 82' (pen.)		Mouelhi 48'; Jemâa 54'; Trabelsi 70'

21 February 2004

Nigeria	2–0	Senegal
Idahor 60', 83'

22 March 2004

Tunisia	2–0	Egypt
Zitouni 32'; Haggui 58'

Stade El Menzah, Tunis

13 March 2004

Nigeria	3–0	Egypt
Akaruye 40', 70'; Ezeji 90'

13 March 2004

Senegal	0–0	Tunisia

27 March 2004

Tunisia	2–0	Nigeria
Mouelhi 45' (pen.); Zitouni 79'

27 March 2004

Egypt	0–1	Senegal
		Papa Waigo

=== Group B ===
Pos	Team	Pld	W	D	L	GF	GA	GD	Pts	Qualification
1	Mali	6	4	0	2	10	5	+5	12	2004 Summer Olympics
2	Cameroon	6	3	2	1	10	4	+6	11	
3	Ivory Coast	6	2	1	3	7	9	−2	7	
4	DR Congo	6	1	1	4	5	14	−9	4	

26 October 2003

DR Congo	1–4	Cameroon
Kalundjila 82'		Wansi; Mokaké; Ngon; Mbamba

26 October 2003

Mali	3–0	Ivory Coast
N'Diaye 45'; Abouta 53'; Diallo 90'

21 December 2003

Cameroon	2–0	Mali
Wansi 44'; Webó 56'

21 December 2003

Ivory Coast	4–1	DR Congo
Djédou 35', 81'; Koutouan 39'; Koné 46'		Kalobo 54'

3 January 2004

Ivory Coast	1–1	Cameroon
Djédou 12'		Rabihou 61'

4 January 2004

DR Congo	0–2	Mali
		Sidibé 51', 76'

22 February 2004

Cameroon	2–0	Ivory Coast
Job 12'; Mokaké 52'

22 February 2004

Mali	3–1	DR Congo
Abouta 11', 36'; Sidibé 32'		Nseke 29'

13 March 2004

Ivory Coast	2–1	Mali
Kouassi 19'; Djédou 26'		Sidibé 47'

14 March 2004

Cameroon	1–1	DR Congo
Job 60'		Nseke 44'

27 March 2004

DR Congo	1–0	Ivory Coast
Saddam 75'

28 March 2004

Mali	1–0	Cameroon
Traoré 7'

=== Group C ===
Pos	Team	Pld	W	D	L	GF	GA	GD	Pts	Qualification
1	Morocco	6	3	2	1	12	3	+9	11	2004 Summer Olympics
2	Angola	6	3	1	2	0	4	−4	10	
3	Ethiopia	6	3	0	3	3	10	−7	9	
4	Uganda	6	1	1	4	4	10	−6	4	

25 October 2003

Uganda	1–2	Angola
Mwesigwa 52'		Loló 60'; Miloy 74'

26 October 2003
15:30 (UTC+0)

Morocco	4–0	Ethiopia
Chamakh 11'; Souidi 15'; Allaoui 65', 79'

Moulay Abdellah Stadium, Rabat
Attendance: Abdelfattah Isameddine (Egypt)

21 December 2003

Angola	0–0	Morocco

Luanda
21 December 2003

Ethiopia	1–0	Uganda
Tafese 16'

3 January 2004

Uganda	1–1	Morocco
Bajope 18'		Bouden 15'

Kampala
4 January 2004

Ethiopia	1–0	Angola
Zinabu 90'

21 February 2004

Morocco	5–0	Uganda
Zemmama 37'; Bouden 38'; Alioui 50'; Kaïssi 78'; Erbati 85'

22 February 2004

Angola	4–0	Ethiopia
Bruno Mauro 15', 69'; Chinho 52'; Sotto 83'

14 March 2004

Angola	1–0	Uganda
Maurito 60'

14 March 2004

Ethiopia	1–0	Morocco
Erbati 90+1' (o.g.)

Addis Ababa Stadium, Addis Ababa

27 March 2004

Morocco	2–1	Angola
Bouden 14', 37' (pen.)		Mendonça 35'

Moulay Abdellah Stadium, Rabat
Referee: Mamadou Sowe (Gambia)
27 March 2004

Uganda	2–1	Ethiopia
Sserunkuma 45' (pen.); Wagaruka 85'		Zeru 51'

=== Group D ===
Pos	Team	Pld	W	D	L	GF	GA	GD	Pts	Qualification
1	Ghana	6	4	1	1	7	2	+5	13	2004 Summer Olympics
2	Zambia	6	3	1	2	7	6	+1	10	
3	South Africa	6	2	0	4	7	7	0	6	
4	Algeria	6	2	0	4	5	11	−6	6	

24 October 2003

Algeria	1–0	Zambia
Ali Hadji 3'

19 May Stadium, Annaba
26 October 2003

Ghana	1–0	South Africa
Poku 82'

Accra

20 December 2003

Zambia	0–0	Ghana

20 December 2003
16:30 (UTC+2)

South Africa	4–1	Algeria
Botha 3' (pen.), 4'; Leremi 14'; Vilakazi 72'		Bouzid 45+4'

Olympia Park, Rustenburg
Referee: Olamini Gilbert (Swaziland)

2 January 2004
16:00 (UTC+1)

Algeria	1–0	Ghana
Yahia 11'

Mustapha Tchaker Stadium, Blida
3 January 2004

South Africa	0–1	Zambia
		Mbesuma 48'

Potchefstroom

21 February 2004

Zambia	2–1	South Africa
Mbesuma 8'; Mulenga 73'		Khenyeza 17'

Nchanga Stadium, Chingola
22 February 2004

Ghana	2–0	Algeria
Addo 38'; Poku 77'

Kumasi Sports Stadium, Kumasi
Attendance: Aguidissou Crespin (Benin)

13 March 2004
17:00 (UTC+2)

Zambia	4–2	Algeria
Chinse 28'; Mulenga 45'; Chalwe 50'; Chansa 90+1'		Bouguèche 19', 55'

Nchanga Stadium, Chingola
13 March 2004

South Africa	1–2	Ghana
Vilakazi 52'		Pimpong 46', 71'

Mamelodi

26 March 2004

Algeria	0–1	South Africa
		Leremi 54'

Mustapha Tchaker Stadium, Blida
28 March 2004

Ghana	2–0	Zambia
Yahouza 20'; Poku 80'

Kumasi Sports Stadium, Kumasi
