= 2012–13 PAOK FC season =

PAOK
2012–13 season
- Chairman: Zisis Vryzas
- Manager: Georgios Georgiadis
- Stadium: Toumba Stadium
- Super League: 2nd
- Greek Cup: Semi-finals
- UEFA Europa League: Play-off round
- Top goalscorer: League: Stefanos Athanasiadis (13); All: Stefanos Athanasiadis (23)
- Highest home attendance: 26,901 vs Asteras Tripolis (17 April 2013)
- Lowest home attendance: 2,223 vs Aiginiakos (22 December 2012)
Home colours	Away colours	Third colours

The 2012–13 season was PAOK Football Club's 87th in existence and the club's 54th consecutive season in the top flight of Greek football. The team entered the Greek Football Cup in the Third Round and also competed in UEFA Europa League starting from the third qualifying round.

On 31 May 2012, Georgios Donis signed a two-year contract, becoming PAOK's manager after the sacking of László Bölöni in the end of 2011–12 season.

== Season overview ==
- On 23 May, it was announced that 35-year-old Pablo García renewed his contract with the club's outfit for one more year.
- On 25 May, PAOK released László Bölöni from the position of first team head coach, after a one-year cooperation.
- On 25 May, Lino also renewed his contract for one more year.
- On 28 May, Pantelis Konstantinidis resigned from the position of vice-president and technical director, claiming a different perception and philosophy, on the strategy to be followed for the new season.
- On 31 May, PAOK appointed Georgios Donis as the new manager on a two-year contract, with immediate effect.
- On 7 June, it was announced that club's new technical director would be Georgios Georgiadis.
- On 1 July, Kostas Chalkias, Sotiris Balafas, Bruno Cirillo, Vladimir Ivić and Mirosław Sznaucner leave PAOK upon the expiry of their contracts. The players were part of the main squad for the last years.
- On 5 July, the team departed for Arnhem, Netherlands where the players would prepare for the upcoming season.
- On 6 July, the Defender Bongani Khumalo joined PAOK on loan from Tottenham Hotspur.
- On 8 July, PAOK completed the signing of Guinean striker Sambégou Bangoura from Panseraikos on a free transfer.
- On 20 July, Kostas Stafylidis agreed to sign a 5-year contract with Bayer 04 Leverkusen. The transfer was reported to be worth €1.5 million. PAOK kept the player for one year as a loan.
- On 26 July, after the friendly match against PSV Eindhoven, Georgios Donis announced that Guinean Sambégou Bangoura, was not counted for the upcoming season.
- On 27 July, when Dario Krešić realised that he is not counted as the main goalkeeper of the team, asked to leave from the club. PAOK released him the next day.
- On 28 July Stelios Malezas was sold to Fortuna Düsseldorf on a transfer that was reported to be worth €450 thousand. The player leaves the club after nine years and 129 appearances.
- On 10 August Russian businessman Ivan Savvidi bought 51% of shares of the Club making him the major shareholder. PAOK passes to a new era, after many years of financial problems.
- On 13 August, centre back Matheus Vivian and midfielder Liam Lawrence join PAOK on a two-year contract.
- On 31 October, midfielder Ergys Kace signed his first professional contract, with a duration of 4,5 years. The new contract came as an award for the good appearances that he made.
- On 11 December, PAOK agreed on a one-and-a-half-year contract with the Greece national football team captain, Kostas Katsouranis. On 14 December the player was officially presented by club's president.

== Players ==
=== Current squad ===
No.	Name	Nationality	Position (s)	Date of birth (age)	Signed from	Notes
Goalkeepers
1	Jacobo Sanz Ovejero	(Spain)	GK	10 July 1983 (30)	(Greece) Asteras Tripolis	
21	Asterios Giakoumis	(Greece)	GK	3 May 1988 (25)	(Greece) Agrotikos Asteras	
27	Charles Itandje	(Cameroon)	GK	2 November 1982 (30)	(Greece) Atromitos	In in Winter TW
71	Panagiotis Glykos	(Greece)	GK	3 June 1986 (27)	(Greece) Olympiacos Volos	
Defenders
2	Alexis Apostolopoulos	(Greece)	RB	7 November 1991 (21)	Youth system	
3	Kostas Stafylidis	(Greece)	LB	2 December 1993 (19)	Youth system	
4	Giorgos Katsikas	(Greece)	CB	14 June 1990 (22)	(Greece) Iraklis	
6	Dimitris Stamou	(Greece)	CB	27 April 1991 (22)	(Greece) Iraklis	Out in Winter TW
13	Gordon Schildenfeld	(Croatia)	CB	18 March 1985 (27)	(Russia) Dynamo Moscow	In in Winter TW
16	Lino	(Brazil)	LB, LW	1 June 1977 (36)	(Portugal) Porto	
22	Dimitris Konstantinidis	(Greece)	RB	2 June 1994 (18)	Youth system	
30	Bongani Khumalo	(South Africa)	CB	6 January 1987 (26)	(England) Tottenham Hotspur	
39	Christos Intzidis	(Greece)	CB	9 January 1993 (20)	Youth system	
44	Matheus Vivian	(Brazil)	CB	5 April 1982 (31)	(France) Nantes	
77	Etto	(Brazil)	RB	8 March 1981 (32)	(Croatia) Dinamo Zagreb	
Midfielders
5	Pablo García (Captain)	(Uruguay)	DM	11 May 1977 (36)	(Spain) Real Madrid	
8	Kostas Panagiotoudis	(Greece)	DM	3 December 1994 (19)	Youth system	Out in Winter TW
9	Zvonimir Vukić	(Serbia)	AM	19 July 1979 (33)	(Serbia) Partizan	In in Winter TW
10	Dimitrios Pelkas	(Greece)	AM / DM	26 October 1993 (19)	Youth system	
18	Georgios Fotakis	(Greece)	AM / DM	29 October 1981 (31)	(Greece) AEL	
20	Liam Lawrence	(Republic of Ireland)	AM / RW	13 December 1981 (31)	(England) Portsmouth	
25	Costin Lazăr	(Romania)	DM / AM	24 April 1981 (32)	(Romania) Rapid București	
26	Ergys Kaçe	(Albania)	DM	8 July 1993 (20)	Youth system	
28	Kostas Katsouranis	(Greece)	DM / CB	21 June 1979 (33)	Panathinaikos	In in Winter TW
62	Sekou Oliseh	(Liberia)	AM	5 June 1990 (22)	(Russia) CSKA Moscow	In in Winter TW
70	Stelios Kitsiou	(Greece)	DM	28 September 1993 (20)	Youth system	
95	Dimitris Popovic	(Greece)	M	11 February 1995 (21)	Youth system	
Forwards
7	Giorgos Georgiadis	(Greece)	RW / LW	14 November 1987 (25)	(Greece) Panserraikos	
11	Bertrand Robert	(France)	LW	16 November 1983 (29)	(Greece) Panthrakikos	
14	Dimitris Salpigidis (Vice-captain)	(Greece)	RW / CF	18 August 1981 (31)	(Greece) Panathinaikos	
33	Stefanos Athanasiadis	(Greece)	CF	24 December 1988 (24)	Youth system	
90	Abdoul Camara	(Guinea)	W / CF	20 February 1990 (22)	(France) Sochaux	In in Winter TW
99	Apostolos Giannou	(Greece)	CF / AM	25 January 1990 (23)	(Greece) Kavala	Out in Winter TW

Last updated: 31 January 2013
Source: Squad at PAOK FC official website

=== Transfers ===
==== In ====
No.	Pos.	Nat.	Name	Age	EU	Moving from	Type	Transfer window	Ends	Transfer fee	Source
26	MF	(Albania)	Ergys Kaçe	20		Anagennisi Epanomi	Loan return	Summer	2017	Free	paokfc.gr
21	GK	(Greece)	Asterios Giakoumis	24	EU	Agrotikos Asteras	Loan return	Summer		Free	
30	CB	(South Africa)	Bongani Khumalo	26		Tottenham Hotspur (England)	Loan	Summer	2013	Free	paok24.com
3	LB	(Greece)	Kostas Stafylidis	19	EU	Bayer Leverkusen (Germany)	Loan	Summer	2013	Free	paok24.com
1	GK	(Spain)	Jacobo Sanz Ovejero	30	EU	Asteras Tripolis	Transfer	Summer	2013	Free	paokfc.gr
44	CB	(Brazil)	Matheus Vivian	30	EU	Nantes (France)	Transfer	Summer	2014	Free	paokfc.gr
20	RW	(Republic of Ireland)	Liam Lawrence	30	EU	Portsmouth (England)	Transfer	Summer	2014	Free	paokfc.gr
28	MF	(Greece)	Kostas Katsouranis	33	EU	Panathinaikos	Transfer	Winter	2014	Free	paokfc.gr
13	DF	(Croatia)	Gordon Schildenfeld	27		Dynamo Moscow (Russia)	Loan	Winter	2013	Free	fcdynamo.ru
9	AM	(Serbia)	Zvonimir Vukić	33		Partizan (Serbia)	Transfer	Winter	2014	Free	paokfc.gr
27	GK	(Cameroon)	Charles Itandje	30	EU	Atromitos	Transfer	Winter	2015	0.2M	paokfc.gr
90	LW	(Guinea)	Abdoul Camara	22	EU	Sochaux (France)	Loan	Winter	2013	Free	paokfc.gr
62	AM	(Liberia)	Sekou Oliseh	22		CSKA Moscow (Russia)	Loan	Winter	2013	Free	paokfc.gr

==== Out ====
No.	Pos.	Nat.	Name	Age	EU	Moving to	Type	Transfer window	Transfer fee	Source
88	FW	(France)	Frédéric Nimani	23	EU	Monaco (France)	Loan return	Summer	Free	
1	GK	(Greece)	Kostas Chalkias	38	EU	Retired	End of contract	Summer	Free	sport24.gr
4	MF	(Greece)	Sotiris Balafas	25	EU	Hoverla Uzhhorod (Ukraine)	End of contract	Summer	Free	paok24.com
8	DF	(Italy)	Bruno Cirillo	35	EU	Alki Larnaca (Cyprus)	End of contract	Summer	Free	balla.com.cy
21	MF	(Serbia)	Vladimir Ivić	35		Free agent	End of contract	Summer	Free	
27	DF	(Poland)	Mirosław Sznaucner	33	EU	Veria	End of contract	Summer	Free	
3	LB	(Greece)	Kostas Stafylidis	19	EU	Bayer Leverkusen (Germany)	Transfer	Summer	€1.5M	bayer04.de
91	GK	(Croatia)	Dario Krešić	28		Lokomotiv Moscow (Russia)	Contract termination	Summer	Free	paokfc.gr
13	DF	(Greece)	Stelios Malezas	27	EU	Fortuna Düsseldorf (Germany)	Transfer	Summer	€0.45M	paok24.com
28	MF	(Greece)	Stavros Tsoukalas	24	EU	PAS Giannina	Contract termination	Summer	Free	paokfc.gr
14	FW	(Greece)	Thanasis Papazoglou	24	EU	OFI	Contract termination	Summer	Free	paokfc.gr
8	MF	(Greece)	Kostas Panagiotoudis	19	EU	Panionios	Loan	Winter	Free	paokfc.gr
6	DF	(Greece)	Dimitris Stamou	22	EU	Kerkyra	Loan	Winter	Free	aokerkyra.com.gr
44	CB	(Brazil)	Matheus Vivian	30	EU	Guingamp (France)	Contract termination	Winter	Free	paokfc.gr
99	CF	(Greece)	Apostolos Giannou	23	EU	Platanias	Loan	Winter	Free	paokfc.gr

Last updated: 31 January 2013

== Current technical staff ==
Position	Staff
Head coach	(Greece) Georgios Donis
Assistant coach	(Greece) Makis Angelinas
Goalkeeping coach	(Greece) Panagiotis Maliaritsis
Physical fitness coaches	(Greece) Grigoris Georgitsas (Greece) Grigoris Kavalieratos
Scouters	(Serbia) Miodrag Medan (Greece) Antonis Lemonakis (Greece) Georgios Kostikos
Technical director	(Greece) Georgios Georgiadis
General manager	(Greece) Konstantinos Iosifidis

Source: PAOK FC official website

== Kit ==
Supplier: Umbro
Sponsor(s): Pame Stoixima, Pepsi Max

Home	Away	Third

== Pre-season and friendlies ==
Date	Place	Opponents	Result F – A	Source
10 July 2012	Heelsum	Oțelul Galați	0–1	Report
14 July 2012	Arnhem	Mons	2–0	Report
18 July 2012	Arnhem	Zwolle	4–1	Report
21 July 2012	Arnhem	Mallorca	0–0	Report

Date	Place	Opponents	Result F – A	Source
26 July 2012	Thessaloniki	PSV Eindhoven	0–2	Report
14 August 2012	Thessaloniki	Skoda Xanthi	2–1	Report
8 September 2012	Thessaloniki	Panserraikos	1–0	Report
11 October 2012	Litochoro	Vataniakos	2–0	Report

Last updated: 11 October 2012
Source: Preseason Friendlies in PAOK FC official site

== Competitions ==
=== Overview ===
Competition	Started round	Current position / round	Final position / round	First match	Last match
Super League	—	—	2nd	26 August 2012	21 April 2013
Greek Cup	Third Round	Semi-finals		13 December 2012	
UEFA Europa League	Third qualifying round	—	Play-off round	2 August 2012	30 August 2012

Updated to match played 19 April 2013
Source: Competitions

Competition	Record							
Competition	Pld	W	D	L	GF	GA	GD	Win %
Super League Greece	30	18	8	4	46	19	+27	60.00
Greek Cup	8	5	1	2	15	7	+8	62.50
UEFA Europa League	4	3	0	1	8	5	+3	75.00
UEFA play-offs	6	3	0	3	7	7	+0	50.00
Total	48	29	9	10	76	38	+38	60.42

Source: Competitions

== Super League ==
=== League table ===
Pos	Team	Pld	W	D	L	GF	GA	GD	Pts	Qualification or relegation
1	Olympiacos (C)	30	24	5	1	64	16	+48	77	Qualification for the Champions League group stage
2	PAOK	30	18	8	4	46	19	+27	62	Qualification for the Play-offs
3	Asteras Tripolis	30	17	5	8	41	25	+16	56	Qualification for the Play-offs
4	Atromitos	30	11	13	6	26	22	+4	46	Qualification for the Play-offs
5	PAS Giannina	30	12	8	10	28	24	+4	44	Qualification for the Play-offs

Source: Super League Greece
Rules for classification: 1) Points; 2) Head-to-head points; 3) Head-to-head goal difference.
If in current league table there are tied teams after applying criteria 1 to 3, they are considered to share places and listed in Greek language alphabetic order.
If in final league table there are still tied teams after applying criteria 1 to 3, a decision match (or matches if they are more than two) are to be played but only in three cases: to determine the champion, to fill spots in the play-off or to determine the teams to be relegated. In any other case, the final standings of tied teams are determined with a public draw
(C) Champions

==== Results summary ====
Overall								Home						Away					
Pld	W	D	L	GF	GA	GD	Pts	W	D	L	GF	GA	GD	W	D	L	GF	GA	GD
30	18	8	4	46	19	+27	62	12	2	1	28	8	+20	6	6	3	18	11	+7

Last updated: 21 April 2013.
Source: Competitive matches

==== Results by round ====
Round	1	2	3	4	5	6	7	8	9	10	11	12	13	14	15	16	17	18	19	20	21	22	23	24	25	26	27	28	29	30
Ground	H	A	H	A	H	A	H	A	A	H	A	H	A	H	A	A	H	A	H	A	H	A	H	H	A	H	A	H	A	H
Result	W	L	W	W	W	D	W	D	W	W	L	D	D	W	W	W	D	L	L	D	W	D	W	W	W	W	D	W	W	W
Position	1	7	4	2	2	3	2	3	2	2	2	2	2	2	2	2	2	2	3	3	2	3	3	3	3	3	3	2	2	2

Source: PAOK at Super League Greece official site and PAOK at soccerway.com
A = Away; H = Home; W = Win; D = Draw; L = Loss

==== Matches ====
26 August 2012 1	PAOK	1–0	Panthrakikos	Thessaloniki
19:15 EEST (UTC+03)	Athanasiadis 57'; Kaçe (yellow card) 87'	Report	Lucero (yellow card) 2'; Ladakis (yellow card) 86'	Stadium: Toumba Stadium; Attendance: 5,324; Referee: Dimitrios Thanos, Grevena

3 September 2012 2	Atromitos	1–0	PAOK	Peristeri, Athens
20:30 EEST (UTC+03)	Lazaridis 79'; Karamanos (yellow card) 90+1'	Report	Fotakis (yellow card) 26'; Kace (yellow card) 68'; Apostolopoulos (yellow card) 85'	Stadium: Peristeri Stadium; Attendance: 3,910; Referee: Stavros Tritsonis, Athens

16 September 2012 3	PAOK	2–1	Asteras Tripolis	Thessaloniki
18:15 EEST (UTC+03)	Khumalo (yellow card) 19'; Lawrence 46'; Kace (yellow card) 68'; Athanasiadis (yellow card) 75', (goal) 88' (pen.)	Report	Perrone 20' (pen.), (yellow card) 67'; Pipinis (yellow card) 48'; Bartolini (yellow card) 68' (yellow-red card) 90+3'; Fülöp (yellow card) 73'; Formica (yellow card) 90'	Stadium: Toumba Stadium; Attendance: 5,601; Referee: Christos Mitsios, Epirus

22 September 2012 4	Skoda Xanthi	0–3	PAOK	Xanthi
19:30 EEST (UTC+03)	Komesidis (yellow card) 9'; Onwuachi (yellow card) 45+1'	Report	Athanasiadis 10' (pen.); Lino (yellow card) 14'; Etto (yellow card) 29'; Robert 54'; Katsikas (yellow card) 61'; Lazăr (yellow card) 77', (goal) 89'	Stadium: Skoda Xanthi Arena; Attendance: 2,330; Referee: Anastasios Sidiropoulos, Dodecanese

30 September 2012 5	PAOK	4–1	Aris	Thessaloniki
20:30 EEST (UTC+03)	Lawrence 12', (red card) 90+9'; Katsikas 23', (yellow card) 87' (red card) 90+1'; Kace (yellow card) 27'; Fotakis 30', (yellow card) 72'; Khumalo (yellow card) 37'; Athanasiadis 43'; Georgiadis (yellow card) 76'; Stafylidis (yellow card) 88'	Report	Pulido (yellow card) 27'; Kapetanos (yellow card) 32'; Aganzo 39', (yellow card) 87'; Kasnaferis (yellow card) 47'; Gianniotas (yellow card) 87' (yellow-red card) 90+9'; Papasterianos (yellow card) 87'	Stadium: Toumba Stadium; Attendance: 20,440; Referee: Anastasios Kakos, Corfu

6 October 2012 6	OFI	1–1	PAOK	Heraklion
19:30 EEST (UTC+03)	Papazoglou 8'; Vando (yellow card) 17' (yellow-red card) 90+2'; Verón (yellow card) 45+3'; Moniakis (yellow card) 50'	Report	Fotakis 18'; Lazăr (yellow card) 34'; Glikos (red card) 40'; Salpingidis (yellow card) 45+1'; Etto (yellow card) 83'; Intzidis (yellow card) 90+1'	Stadium: Yedi Kule; Attendance: 2,487; Referee: Alexandros Dimitropoulos, Phthiotis

20 October 2012 7	PAOK	1–0	AEK	Thessaloniki
19:30 EEST (UTC+03)	Athanasiadis 51'; Lawrence (yellow card) 65' (yellow-red card) 69'; Jacobo (yellow card) 90'	Report	Kondoes (yellow card) 53'; Fetsis (yellow card) 70'; Lagos (yellow card) 78'; Yago (yellow card) 86'; Kourellas (yellow card) 89'	Stadium: Toumba Stadium; Attendance: 15,239; Referee: Dimitrios Thanos, Grevena

27 October 2012 8	Kerkyra	0–0	PAOK	Corfu
19:30 EEST (UTC+03)		Report	Lazăr (yellow card) 37'; Athanasiadis (yellow card) 78'; Kitsiou (yellow card) 83'	Stadium: Kerkyra Stadium; Attendance: 889; Referee: Michalis Voskakis, Rethymno

4 November 2012 9	Panionios	1–2	PAOK	Nea Smyrni, Athens
17:15 EET (UTC+02)	Rokas (yellow card) 38'; Kolovos (yellow card) 44'; Aravidis 56'; Spyropoulos (yellow card) 90+2'	Report	Athanasiadis 39' (pen.), 42'; Lazăr (red card) 44'; Khumalo (yellow card) 55'; Fotakis (yellow card) 71'; Etto (yellow card) 74'; Jacobo (yellow card) 90+3'	Stadium: Nea Smyrni Stadium; Attendance: 3,953; Referee: Georgios Kominis, Thesprotia

11 November 2012 10	PAOK	2–0	Platanias	Thessaloniki
17:15 EET (UTC+02)	Panagiotoudis (yellow card) 64'; Salpigidis 68' (pen.); Lino 73', (yellow card) 74'	Report	Aguilera (yellow card) 44'; Potouridis (yellow card) 67'; Argyropoulos (yellow card) 69'	Stadium: Toumba Stadium; Attendance: 7,765; Referee: Alexandros Aretopoulos, Trikala

18 November 2012 11	Panathinaikos	2–0	PAOK	Athens
19:30 EET (UTC+02)	Vyntra (yellow card) 23'; Zeca 51'; Vitolo 84' (pen.)	Report	Katsikas (yellow card) 81'; Giannou (yellow card) 83'; Jacobo (yellow card) 85' (red card) 85'	Stadium: Olympic Stadium; Attendance: 13,511; Referee: Stavros Tritsonis, Athens

25 November 2012 12	PAOK	1–1	Olympiacos	Thessaloniki
19:30 EET (UTC+02)	Athanasiadis (yellow card) 76', (goal) 88'	Report	Djebbour 27'	Stadium: Toumba Stadium; Attendance: 23,023; Referee: Stavros Mantalos, Athens

2 December 2012 13	Veria	0–0	PAOK	Veria
17:15 EET (UTC+02)	Bargan (yellow card) 6'; Kali (yellow card) 57'; Amarantidis (yellow card) 81'	Report	Athanasiadis (yellow card) 28'; Vivian (red card) 36'	Stadium: Veria Stadium; Attendance: 2,862; Referee: Ilias Spathas, Piraeus

8 December 2012 14	PAOK	1–0	Levadiakos	Thessaloniki
17:15 EET (UTC+02)	Kace (yellow card) 18'; Fotakis (yellow card) 37'; Lino 69'	Report	Mendy (yellow card) 60'	Stadium: Toumba Stadium; Attendance: 6,015; Referee: Michalis Voskakis, Rethymno

17 December 2012 15	PAS Giannina	1–3	PAOK	Ioannina
19:30 EET (UTC+02)	Fegrouche (yellow card) 19'; Ilić 76'	Report	Salpigidis 20', 67'; Athanasiadis 32', (yellow card) 86'; Kace (yellow card) 49'; Lawrence (yellow card) 54'; Vivian (yellow card) 62'	Stadium: Zosimades Stadium; Attendance: 3,241; Referee: Andreas Pappas, Athens

6 January 2013 16	Panthrakikos	1–4	PAOK	Komotini
17:15 EET (UTC+02)	Baykara (yellow card) 20'; Kace 32' (o.g.); Koutsopoulos (red card) 39'; Adilović (yellow card) 62'; Ladakis (yellow card) 63'	Report	Robert (yellow card) 23'; Lazăr 70'; Salpigidis 76'; Katsikas (yellow card) 82'; Giannou 87'; Katsouranis (yellow card) 90'; Stafylidis 90+2'	Stadium: Komotini Municipal Stadium; Attendance: 3,914; Referee: Anastasios Kakos, Corfu

13 January 2013 17	PAOK	0–0	Atromitos	Thessaloniki
19:30 EET (UTC+02)	Lino (yellow card) 65'; Lawrence (yellow card) 68'; Pelkas (yellow card) 74'; Stafylidis (yellow card) 78'	Report	Chumbinho (yellow card) 54'; Iglesias (yellow card) 61'; Giannoulis (yellow card) 83'	Stadium: Toumba Stadium; Attendance: 9,684; Referee: Anastasios Sidiropoulos, Dodecanese

19 January 2013 18	Asteras Tripolis	1–0	PAOK	Tripoli
19:30 EET (UTC+02)	Navarro 24'	Report	Vivian (yellow card) 68'; Athanasiadis (yellow card) 68'; Stafylidis (yellow card) 76'; Katsikas (yellow card) 85'	Stadium: Asteras Tripolis Stadium; Attendance: 2,218; Referee: Stavros Mantalos, Athens

27 January 2013 19	PAOK	0–1	Skoda Xanthi	Thessaloniki
17:15 EET (UTC+02)	Kace (yellow card) 22'; Katsouranis (yellow card) 80'	Report	Dié (yellow card) 9'; Onwuachi 45+1'; Paíto (yellow card) 48'; Goutas (yellow card) 88'	Stadium: Toumba Stadium; Attendance: 9,996; Referee: Athanasios Giachos, Chios

3 February 2013 20	Aris	2–2	PAOK	Thessaloniki
19:30 EET (UTC+02)	Aganzo 5', 71' (pen.), (yellow card) 78'; Coelho (yellow card) 12'; Vellidis (yellow card) 75'; Triantafyllakos (yellow card) 75'	Report	Athanasiadis 2', (yellow card) 75'; Camara 26'; Konstantinidis (yellow card) 27' (yellow-red card) 70'; Lazăr (yellow card) 51'; Schildenfeld (yellow card) 54'	Stadium: Kleanthis Vikelidis Stadium; Attendance: 12,673; Referee: Michalis Voskakis, Rethymno

9 February 2013 21	PAOK	3–1	OFI	Thessaloniki
17:15 EET (UTC+02)	Athanasiadis (yellow card) 35', (goal) 38'; Camara (yellow card) 43'; Katsikas 45+1'; Lawrence 49', (yellow card) 57'	Report	Perogamvrakis 9'; Bourbos (yellow card) 26'	Stadium: Toumba Stadium; Attendance: 8,850; Referee: Giorgos Kyzas, Drama

16 February 2013 22	AEK	0–0	PAOK	Athens
19:30 EET (UTC+02)	Mitropoulos (yellow card) 66'; Fountas (yellow card) 83'	Report	Kace (yellow card) 15'; Katsouranis (yellow card) 30'; Lawrence (yellow card) 85'	Stadium: Olympic Stadium; Attendance: 15,105; Referee: Alexandros Aretopoulos, Trikala

23 February 2013 23	PAOK	3–1	Kerkyra	Thessaloniki
17:15 EET (UTC+02)	Salpigidis 25', 34'; Katsouranis (yellow card) 27'; Athanasiadis 30'	Report	Tsoumanis (yellow card) 20'; Gesios (yellow card) 33', (goal) 68'	Stadium: Toumba Stadium; Attendance: 7,701; Referee: Alexandros Dimitropoulos, Phthiotis

3 March 2013 24	PAOK	4–2	Panionios	Thessaloniki
17:15 EET (UTC+02)	Kace 31'; Salpigidis 50'; Katsouranis (yellow card) 62', (goal) 80'; Vukić 87'	Report	Andralas 34'; Kurdi (yellow card) 60'; Goundoulakis 63' (pen.); Kolovos (yellow card) 64'	Stadium: Toumba Stadium; Attendance: 11,654; Referee: Gerasimos Dichos, Preveza

9 March 2013 25	Platanias	1–2	PAOK	Platanias
19:30 EET (UTC+02)	Itandje 24' (o.g.); Dimitris (yellow card) 56'; Kanakoudis (yellow card) 67'; Anastasakos (yellow card) 88'	Report	Salpigidis 3', 32', (red card) 76'; Stafylidis (yellow card) 23' (yellow-red card) 46'	Stadium: Perivolia Municipal Stadium; Attendance: 2,896; Referee: Ioannis Delfakis. Arcadia

17 March 2013 26	PAOK	2–0	Panathinaikos	Thessaloniki
19:30 EET (UTC+02)	Camara 58'; Vukić 81'	Report	Sow (yellow card) 1' (yellow-red card) 39'; Kajiyama (yellow card) 83'; Zeca (yellow card) 84'	Stadium: Toumba Stadium; Attendance: 19,856; Referee: Dimitris Styliaras, Aitoloakarnanía

31 March 2013 27	Olympiacos	0–0	PAOK	Piraeus
19:30 EET (UTC+02)		Report	Schildenfeld (yellow card) 34'; Vukić (yellow card) 89'; Camara (yellow card) 90+4'	Stadium: Karaiskakis Stadium; Attendance: 28.417; Referee: Anastasios Sidiropoulos, Dodecanese

6 April 2013 28	PAOK	2–0	Veria	Thessaloniki
17:15 EET (UTC+02)	Mokaké 34' (o.g.); Lawrence (yellow card) 43'; Lino (yellow card) 84'; Athanasiadis 85'	Report	Kaltsas (yellow card) 72'	Stadium: Toumba Stadium; Attendance: 9.020; Referee: Michalis Voskakis, Rethymno

14 April 2013 29	Levadiakos	0–1	PAOK	Livadeia
19:00 EET (UTC+02)	Romeu (yellow card) 54'; Poy (yellow card) 86'	Report	Fotakis (yellow card) 43'; Robert 50'; Lawrence (yellow card) 69'; Kitsiou (yellow card) 81'; Konstantinidis (yellow card) 82'; Schildenfeld (yellow card) 86'	Stadium: Levadia Municipal Stadium; Attendance: 1.021; Referee: Haralambos Lalogeropoulos, Athens

21 April 2013 30	PAOK	2–0	PAS Giannina	Thessaloniki
19:00 EET (UTC+02)	Glykos (yellow card) 59'; Georgiadis 68'; Fotakis (yellow card) 73'; Katsouranis 80'; Kitsiou (yellow card) 90+1'	Report	De Vincenti (yellow card) 59'; Keita (yellow card) 90+2'	Stadium: Toumba Stadium; Attendance: 9.758; Referee: Alexandros Aretopoulos, Trikala

Last updated: 21 April 2013
Source: Super League Greece, PAOK FC official website

=== Play-offs ===
Pos	Team	Pld	W	D	L	GF	GA	GD	Pts	Qualification
2	PAOK	6	3	0	3	7	7	0	13	Qualification for the Champions League third qualifying round
3	Atromitos	6	3	2	1	8	5	+3	11	Qualification for the Europa League play-off round (Note: Since Asteras Tripolis lost the 2012–13 Greek Football Cup final to a team already qualified for European competitions, Olympiacos, all of the Europa League allocations were made through play-off positions.)
4	Asteras Tripolis	6	2	1	3	6	7	−1	9	Qualification for the Europa League third qualifying round
5	PAS Giannina	6	2	1	3	6	8	−2	7	

Source: Super League Greece: Standings and Schedule
Rules for classification: 1) points; 2) head-to-head points; 3) head-to-head goal difference; 4) classification of regular season

==== Matches ====
15 May 2013 1	Atromitos	2–1	PAOK	Peristeri, Athens
19:15 EET	Iglesias 72'; Chumbinho 90'; Tavlaridis (yellow card) 90+2' Manager: (Greece) Georgios Paraschos	Report	(yellow card) 32' Camara; 60' Salpigidis; (yellow card) 83' Lazăr; (yellow card) 86' Georgiadis Manager: (Greece) Georgios Georgiadis	Stadium: Peristeri Stadium; Attendance: 3117; Referee: Anastasios Kakos

19 May 2013 2	PAOK	0–1	PAS Giannina	Thessaloniki
18:15 EET	Kaçe (yellow card) 81' Manager: (Greece) Georgios Georgiadis	Report	(yellow card) 29' Roumpoulakos; (yellow card) 44' Oikonomou; (yellow card) 58' Kolovetsios; (yellow card) 72' Berios; (yellow card) 88' De Vincenti; 88' Lila Manager: (Greece) Giannis Christopoulos	Stadium: Toumba Stadium; Attendance: 8088; Referee: Marios Labropoulos

22 May 2013 3	Asteras Tripolis	1–2	PAOK	Tripoli
20:30 EET	Kourbelis (yellow card) 40'; Tsabouris (yellow card) 65'; Perrone (penalty missed) 90+1' Manager: (Greece) Sakis Tsiolis	Report	(yellow card) 25' Lazăr; (yellow card) 40' Etto; (yellow card) 62' Vukić; 77' (yellow card) 89' Athanasiadis; 80' Katsouranis; (red card) 89' Schildenfeld Manager: (Greece) Georgios Georgiadis	Stadium: Theodoros Kolokotronis Stadium; Attendance: 2634; Referee: Anastasios Sidiropoulos

26 May 2013 4	PAOK	1–0	Asteras Tripolis	Thessaloniki
18:15 EET	Kaçe (yellow card) 52' (yellow-red card) 87'; Oliseh 57' (yellow card) 58'; Katsouranis (yellow card) 74'; Lazăr (yellow card) 77' Manager: (Greece) Georgios Georgiadis	Report	(yellow card) 23' Kontoes Manager: (Greece) Sakis Tsiolis	Stadium: Toumba Stadium; Attendance: 10529; Referee: Anastasios Kakos

29 May 2013 5	PAOK	1–2	Atromitos	Thessaloniki
18:15 EET	Salpigidis 33'; Stafylidis (yellow card) 57'; Robert (yellow card) 90+1' Manager: (Greece) Georgios Georgiadis	Report	46' 90+3' Napoleoni; (yellow card) 57' Iglesias; (yellow card) 74' Ballas Manager: (Greece) Georgios Paraschos	Stadium: Toumba Stadium; Attendance: 9538; Referee: Dimitris Styliaras

2 June 2013 6	PAS Giannina	1–2	PAOK	Ioannina
20:30 EET	De Vincenti 31' (pen.) (yellow card) 38'; Keita (yellow card) 32'; Tzimopoulos (yellow card) 78' Manager: (Greece) Giannis Christopoulos	Report	(yellow card) 38' Konstantinidis; (yellow card) 55' Khumalo; 70' (yellow card) 76' Katsouranis; 74' Schildenfeld; (yellow card) 88' Salpigidis Manager: (Greece) Georgios Georgiadis	Stadium: Zosimades Stadium; Attendance: 3381; Referee: Stavros Mandalos

== Greek Cup ==
=== Third round ===
13 December 2012 1st Leg	Aiginiakos	1–3	PAOK	Katerini
20:30 EET (UTC+02)	Exarchos 18'	Report	Giannou 11'; Salpingidis 28'; Fotakis 62'; Pelkas (yellow card) 87'	Stadium: Katerini Municipal Stadium; Referee: Giannis Topouzis, Thrace

22 December 2012 2nd Leg	PAOK	2–1 (5–2 agg.)	Aiginiakos	Thessaloniki
20:30 EET (UTC+02)	Giannou 35'; Stafylidis 64'	Report	Giakoumis 77' (o.g.)	Stadium: Toumba Stadium; Attendance: 2,223; Referee: Christos Granas, Xanthi

=== Fourth round ===
10 January 2013 1st Leg	Kallithea	2–0	PAOK	Kallithea, Athens
20:00 EET (UTC+02)	Stavrou (yellow card) 57'; D'Acol 79' (pen.); Maroukakis 83', (yellow card) 84'; Matsoukas (yellow card) 90+1'	Report; Report	Kace (yellow card) 45'; Vivian (red card) 78'; Stafylidis (yellow card) 80'	Stadium: Grigoris Lambrakis Stadium; Attendance: 1,150; Referee: Marios Lampropoulos, Ilia

24 January 2013 2nd Leg	PAOK	6–0 (6–2 agg.)	Kallithea	Thessaloniki
20:00 EET (UTC+02)	Athanasiadis 6', 41', 56'; Lazăr 12'; Lawrence 38' (pen.); Katsouranis 43'	Report	Arvanitis (yellow card) 24'; Villarejo (red card) 38'; Maroukakis (yellow card) 85'	Stadium: Toumba Stadium; Attendance: 10,035; Referee: Christos Mitsios, Epirus

=== Quarter-finals ===
28 February 2013 1st Leg	PAOK	2–0	Levadiakos	Thessaloniki
20:00 EET (UTC+02)	García (yellow card) 12'; Athanasiadis 57'; Salpingidis 60'; Lazăr (yellow card) 89'	Report; Report	Martins (yellow card) 15'; Romeu (yellow card) 90'	Stadium: Toumba Stadium; Attendance: 11,548; Referee: Athanasios Giachos, Chios

6 March 2013 2nd Leg	Levadiakos	0–0 (0–2 agg.)	PAOK	Livadeia
18:00 EET (UTC+02)		Report		Stadium: Levadia Municipal Stadium; Referee: Stavros Mantalos, Athens

=== Semi-finals ===
17 April 2013 1st Leg	PAOK	2–1	Asteras Tripolis	Thessaloniki
EET (UTC+02)	Athanasiadis 24'; Katsouranis (yellow card) 45+2'; Lawrence (yellow card) 81'; Camara (yellow card) 87'; Salpingidis 89'	Report; Report	Navaro 64', (yellow card) 88'; Kalantzis (yellow card) 84'; Bartolini (yellow card) 87'	Stadium: Toumba Stadium; Attendance: 26,901; Referee: Stavros Mantalos, Athens

27 April 2013 2nd Leg	Asteras Tripolis	2–0 (3–2 agg.)	PAOK	Tripoli
EET (UTC+02)	Kourbelis (yellow card) 50'; Usero 61' 86'; Kontoes (yellow card) 75'; Álvarez (yellow card) 76'		(yellow card) 53' Kaçe; (yellow card) 45+1' Itandje; (yellow card) 83' Oliseh	Stadium: Asteras Tripolis Stadium; Referee: Ilias Spathas (Piraeus)

Last updated: 19 April 2013
Source: epo.gr PAOK FC official website

== UEFA Europa League ==
=== Third qualifying round ===
2 August 2012 1st Leg	Bnei Yehuda (Israel)	0–2	(Greece) PAOK	Ramat Gan, Israel
19:00 CET	Azuz (yellow card) 56'; Nahum (yellow card) 61'	Report	Etto (yellow card) 38'; Georgiadis 62'; Athanasiadis 72', (yellow card) 89'	Stadium: Ramat Gan Stadium; Attendance: 2,156; Referee: Pavle Radovanović, Montenegro

9 August 2012 2nd Leg	PAOK (Greece)	4–1 (6–1 agg.)	(Israel) Bnei Yehuda	Thessaloniki, Greece
20:00 CET	Athanasiadis 48', 52'; Robert 79'; Pelkas 90+1'	Report	Marinković 7'; Menashe (yellow card) 44' (yellow-red card) 50'; Abu-Zaid (yellow card) 58'; Ivaškevičius (yellow card) 81'	Stadium: Toumba Stadium; Attendance: 9,544; Referee: Cristian Balaj, Romania

=== Play-off round ===
23 August 2012 1st Leg	PAOK (Greece)	2–1	(Austria) Rapid Wien	Thessaloniki, Greece
20:30 CET	Lazăr (yellow card) 52' (yellow-red card) 74'; Khumalo (yellow card) 56'; Athanasiadis 69'; Salpingidis (yellow card) 80'; Katsikas 83', (yellow card) 84'	Report	Burgstaller (yellow card) 23'; Alar 25'; Schimpelsberger (yellow card) 31'	Stadium: Toumba Stadium; Attendance: 19,628; Referee: Andre Marriner, England

30 August 2012 2nd Leg	Rapid Wien (Austria)	3–0 (4–2 agg.)	(Greece) PAOK	Vienna, Austria
20:45 CET	Alar 31'; Burgstaller (yellow card) 35'; Boyd 48'; Hofmann 90+3'	Report	Kaçe (yellow card) 20'; Athanasiadis (yellow card) 85'	Stadium: Gerhard Hanappi Stadium; Referee: Carlos Clos Gómez, Spain

Last updated: 30 August 2012
Source: PAOK FC at uefa.com

== Statistics ==
=== Squad statistics ===
As of Full Season-All matches

Appearances denote players in the starting lineup, with the numbers in parentheses denoting appearances as substitute.

No.	Name	Superleague		Greek Cup		Play-offs		Europa League		Total	
No.	Name	Apps	Goals	Apps	Goals	Apps	Goals	Apps	Goals	Apps	Goals
Goalkeepers
1	(Spain) Sanz Jacobo	9 (1)	0	1	0	1	0	0	0	11 (1)	0
21	(Greece) Asterios Giakoumis	0	0	1	0	0	0	0	0	1	0
27	(Cameroon) Charles Itandje ^{2}	9	0	4	0	1	0	0	0	14	0
71	(Greece) Panagiotis Glykos	13	0	2	0	4	0	4	0	23	0
Defenders
2	(Greece) Apostolopoulos	13 (2)	0	7	0	3 (1)	0	0	0	23 (3)	0
3	(Greece) Kostas Stafylidis	18 (7)	1	3	1	3 (2)	0	0	0	24 (9)	2
4	(Greece) Giorgos Katsikas	16 (1)	2	2	0	1 (1)	0	3	1	22 (2)	3
13	(Croatia) Gordon Schildenfeld ^{2}	11	0	4	0	4	1	0	0	19	1
16	(Brazil) Lino	27 (5)	2	5	0	6	0	4	0	42 (5)	2
22	(Greece) Dimitris Konstantinidis	14 (3)	0	3 (2)	0	1	0	0	0	18 (5)	0
30	(South Africa) Bongani Khumalo	19 (3)	0	1 (1)	0	4	0	4	0	28 (4)	0
39	(Greece) Christos Intzidis	5 (2)	0	3	0	0	0	1 (1)	0	9 (3)	0
44	(Brazil) Matheus Vivian^{1}	7 (2)	0	3	0	0	0	1	0	11 (2)	0
70	(Greece) Stelios Kitsiou	8 (6)	0	3 (1)	0	1 (1)	0	0	0	12 (8)	0
77	(Brazil) Etto	14 (4)	0	1 (1)	0	3	0	4	0	22 (5)	0
Midfielders
5	(Uruguay) Pablo García^{1}	4 (2)	0	3 (1)	0	0	0	2	0	9 (3)	0
7	(Greece) Georgios Georgiadis	7 (5)	1	2 (1)	0	4 (4)	0	4	1	17 (10)	2
8	(Greece) Kostas Panagiotoudis^{1}	1 (1)	0	2 (1)	0	0	0	0	0	3 (2)	0
9	(Serbia) Zvonimir Vukić ^{2}	3 (3)	2	0	0	4 (1)	0	0	0	7 (4)	2
10	(Greece) Dimitrios Pelkas	10 (6)	0	3 (2)	0	0	0	3 (3)	1	16 (11)	1
11	(France) Bertrand Robert	19 (5)	2	4 (2)	0	4	0	4	1	31 (7)	3
18	(Greece) Georgios Fotakis	25 (6)	2	5 (3)	1	2	0	3 (2)	0	35 (11)	3
20	(Republic of Ireland) Liam Lawrence	22 (3)	3	7	1	5 (3)	0	2 (2)	0	36 (8)	4
25	(Romania) Costin Lazăr	25 (1)	2	7	1	4 (1)	0	3	0	39 (2)	3
26	(Albania) Ergys Kaçe	27	1	6 (1)	0	4	0	4 (2)	0	41 (3)	1
28	(Greece) Kostas Katsouranis ^{2}	12 (1)	2	6	1	6	2	0	0	24 (1)	5
62	(Liberia) Sekou Oliseh ^{2}	6 (2)	0	2 (2)	0	5 (1)	1	0	0	13 (5)	1
95	(Greece) Dimitris Popovic	2 (2)	0	2 (2)	0	0	0	0	0	4 (4)	0
Forwards
14	(Greece) Dimitris Salpigidis	26 (3)	9	6 (1)	3	5	2	3 (2)	0	40 (6)	14
19	(Greece) Vasilis Papadopoulos	1 (1)	0	0	0	0	0	0	0	1 (1)	0
33	(Greece) Stefanos Athanasiadis	26 (1)	13	6	5	6 (2)	1	4	4	42 (3)	23
90	(Guinea) Abdoul Camara ^{2}	10 (1)	2	3	0	3	0	0	0	16 (1)	2
99	(Greece) Apostolos Giannou	11 (11)	1	3 (1)	2	0	0	3	0	17 (12)	3

Last updated: 2 June 2013
Source: Match reports in competitive matches, superleaguegreece.net, uefa.com, paokfc.gr soccerway.com
Ordered by squad number
0 shown as blank

^{1}Out in Winter TW
^{2}In in Winter TW

=== Goalscorers ===
Rank	No.	Pos.	Player	Super League	Greek Cup	Play-offs	Europa League	Total
1	33	FW	(Greece) Athanasiadis	13	5	1	4	23
2	14	FW	(Greece) Dimitris Salpingidis	9	3	2	0	14
3	28	MF	(Greece) Kostas Katsouranis	2	1	2	0	5
4	20	MF	(Republic of Ireland) Liam Lawrence	3	1	0	0	4
5	25	MF	(Romania) Costin Lazăr	2	1	0	0	3
6	11	MF	(France) Bertrand Robert	2	0	0	1	3
7	18	MF	(Greece) Giorgos Fotakis	2	1	0	0	3
8	4	DF	(Greece) Giorgos Katsikas	2	0	0	1	3
9	99	FW	(Greece) Apostolos Giannou	1	2	0	0	3
10	90	FW	(Guinea) Abdoul Camara	2	0	0	0	2
11	9	MF	(Serbia) Zvonimir Vukić	2	0	0	0	2
12	16	DF	(Greece) Lino	2	0	0	0	2
13	7	MF	(Greece) Giorgos Georgiadis	1	0	0	1	2
14	3	DF	(Greece) Kostas Stafylidis	1	1	0	0	2
15	26	MF	(Albania) Ergys Kaçe	1	0	0	0	1
16	10	MF	(Greece) Dimitrios Pelkas	0	0	0	1	1
17	13	DF	(Croatia) Gordon Schildenfeld	0	0	1	0	1
18	62	MF	(Liberia) Sekou Oliseh	0	0	1	0	1
Own goals				1	0	0	0	1
TOTALS				46	15	7	8	76

Last updated: All matches
Source: Match reports in Competitive matches
0 shown as blank

=== Assists ===
R	Player	Position	Super League	Greek Cup	Europa League	Total	Notes
1	(Republic of Ireland) Liam Lawrence	AM	2	4	1	7	
2	(Greece) Dimitris Salpingidis	CF	5	1		6	
2	(Greece) Stefanos Athanasiadis	CF	3	1	2	6	
4	(France) Bertrand Robert	LW	3		1	4	
5	(Greece) Giorgios Fotakis	AM	2			2	
5	(Brazil) Etto	RB	1		1	2	
5	(Romania) Costin Lazăr	AM	1	1		2	
5	(Brazil) Lino	LB	1		1	2	
5	(Greece) Kostas Katsouranis	DM	2			2	In in Winter TW
5	(Guinea) Abdoul Camara	LW	1	1		2	In in Winter TW
11	(Albania) Ergys Kace	DM	1			1	
11	(Greece) Alexis Apostolopoulos	RB	1			1	
11	(Croatia) Gordon Schildenfeld	CB	1			1	In in Winter TW
11	(Croatia) Sekou Oliseh	RW	1			1	In in Winter TW

Last updated: 17 April 2013
Source: superleaguegreece.net, uefa.com, paokfc.gr
0 shown as blank

=== Disciplinary record ===
No.	Pos	Nat	Name	Super League			Greek Cup			Europa League			Total			Notes
No.	Pos	Nat	Name	Yellow card	(yellow card) (yellow-red card)	Red card	Yellow card	(yellow card) (yellow-red card)	Red card	Yellow card	(yellow card) (yellow-red card)	Red card	Yellow card	(yellow card) (yellow-red card)	Red card	Notes
44	DF	(Brazil)	Matheus Vivian	2		1			1				2		2	
25	MF	(Romania)	Costin Lazăr	4		1	1				1		5	1	1	
20	MF	(Republic of Ireland)	Liam Lawrence	6	1	1							6	1	1	
4	DF	(Greece)	Giorgos Katsikas	5		1				1			6		1	
1	GK	(Spain)	Jacobo	3		1							3		1	
14	FW	(Greece)	Dimitris Salpingidis	1		1				1			2		1	
71	GK	(Greece)	Panagiotis Glikos			1									1	
3	DF	(Greece)	Kostas Stafylidis	3	1		1						4	1		
22	DF	(Greece)	Dimitris Konstantinidis	1	1								1	1		
26	MF	(Albania)	Ergys Kaçe	8			1			1			10			
33	FW	(Greece)	Stefanos Athanasiadis	8						2			10			
28	MF	(Greece)	Kostas Katsouranis	5									5			In in Winter TW
18	MF	(Greece)	Giorgos Fotakis	5									5			
30	DF	(South Africa)	Bongani Khumalo	3						1			4			
77	DF	(Brazil)	Etto	3						1			4			
16	DF	(Brazil)	Lino	4									4			
13	DF	(Croatia)	Gordon Schildenfeld	3									3			In in Winter TW
10	MF	(Greece)	Dimitrios Pelkas	1			1						2			
70	MF	(Greece)	Stelios Kitsiou	2									2			
90	FW	(Guinea)	Abdoul Camara	2									2			In in Winter TW
2	DF	(Greece)	Alexis Apostolopoulos	1									1			
7	FW	(Greece)	Giorgos Georgiadis	1									1			
39	DF	(Greece)	Christos Intzidis	1									1			
8	MF	(Greece)	Kostas Panagiotoudis	1									1			Out in Winter TW
7	FW	(Greece)	Apostolos Giannou	1									1			
11	FW	(France)	Bertrand Robert	1									1			
5	MF	(Uruguay)	Pablo García				1						1			
9	MF	(Serbia)	Zvonimir Vukić				1						1			
			TOTAL	73	3	7	3	0	0	7	1	0	83	4	8	

Last updated: 14 April 2013
Source: Match reports in competitive matches, superleaguegreece.net, uefa.com, paokfc.gr
Only competitive matches
Ordered by (red card) , (yellow card) (yellow-red card) and (yellow card)

(yellow card) = Number of bookings; (yellow card) (yellow-red card) = Number of sending offs after a second yellow card; (red card) = Number of sending offs by a direct red card.

0 shown as blank

=== Overall ===
	Total	Home	Away
Games played	39	19	20
Games won	24	16	8
Games drawn	9	2	7
Games lost	6	1	5
Biggest win	6–0 vs Kallithea	6–0 vs Kalithea	3–0 vs Skoda Xanthi; 4–1 vs Panthrakikos
Biggest loss	0–3 vs Rapid Wien	0–1 vs Skoda Xanthi	0–3 vs Rapid Wien
Biggest win (League)	4–1 vs Aris	4–1 vs Aris	4–1 vs Panthrakikos; 3–0 vs Skoda Xanthi
Biggest win (Cup)	6–0 vs Kalithea	6–0 vs Kalithea	3–1 vs Aiginiakos
Biggest win (Europe)	4–1 vs Bnei Yehuda	4–1 vs Bnei Yehuda	2–0 vs Bnei Yehuda
Biggest loss (League)	0–2 vs Panathinaikos	0–1 vs Skoda Xanthi	0–2 vs Panathinaikos
Biggest loss (Cup)	0–2 vs Kallithea		0–2 vs Kallithea
Biggest loss (Europe)	0–3 vs Rapid Wien		0–3 vs Rapid Wien
Goals scored	65	42	23
Goals conceded	28	11	17
Goal difference	+37	+31	+6
Average GF per game	1.67	2.21	1.15
Average GA per game	0.72	0.58	0.85
Yellow cards	92	36	56
Red cards	12	4	8
Most appearances	(Greece) Stefanos Athanasiadis (Albania) Ergys Kace (Greece) Dimitris Salpingidis (33)	–	
Most minutes played	(Greece) Stefanos Athanasiadis (2894)	–	
Most goals	(Greece) Stefanos Athanasiadis (21)	–	
Most assists	(Republic of Ireland) Liam Lawrence (7)	–	
Winning rate	61.54%	84.21%	40%

Last updated: 14 April 2013
Source: Competitive matches
