= Panagiotis Glykos =

Greek footballer

Personal information
- Full name: Panagiotis Georgios Glykos
- Date of birth: 10 October 1986 (age 40)
- Place of birth: Volos, Thessaly, Greece
- Height: 1.87 m (6 ft 2 in)
- Position: Goalkeeper

Youth career
- 2001–2004: Olympiacos Volos

Senior career*
Years	Team	Apps	(Gls)
2004–2007	Olympiacos Volos	20	(0)
2007–2019	PAOK	109	(0)
2009	→ Olympiacos Volos (loan)	6	(0)
2010–2011	→ Agrotikos Asteras (loan)	9	(0)
2020–2021	Apollon Larissa	9	(0)
Total		153	(0)

International career^{‡}
2014–2017	Greece	5	(0)
- * Club domestic league appearances and goals as of 10 April 2021 ‡ National team caps and goals as of 14 May 2018

Panagiotis Glykos (Greek: Παναγιώτης Γλύκος; born 10 October 1986) is a Greek former professional footballer who played as a goalkeeper.

== Club career ==
=== PAOK ===
The Keeper began his career at Olympiacos Volos, playing in their youth and reserve teams before signing for PAOK in 2007 as PAOK's manager Fernando Santos needed an extra goalkeeper for the upcoming season. He made his official debut for the club in a cup fixture in 2008. He was then shipped out on loan, making a handful of appearances, before establishing himself in the first team fold in the 2011–12 season. From then, he has regularly done battle with the other keepers in the squad to secure the No1 spot. In fact, at the start of the 2013–14 season, he began the league campaign on the bench, with Spaniard Jacobo preferred, before being handed the first team reins in November. Glykos grabbed the opportunity with both hands, starting all but two of the remaining fixtures and forcing his way into Fernando Santos's squad for Brazil.

Glykos named as the best player of PAOK in January and February as a result of the ballot held every month at the official site of the fans. At the announcement is stated: "In football you ought to be always ready to seize the opportunity whenever it is given to you. Panagiotis proved ready! He took his gloves after basic disciplinary misconduct of the basic goalkeeper Jacobo and has been one of the revelations of the season. Consistently good, with sure and effective interventions, is undoubtedly the best Greek goalkeeper and one of the best players of PAOK in the season."

On 13 May 2014 after his best year in his career with 40 games with the club in all competitions, Glykos received a proposal to renew his contract which expires in 2015. The club wants to "bind" the international keeper, who is candidate to be among the three keepers for the World Cup in Brazil, for another two years. The report also states that the proposal reaches €250,000 per year and the release clause reaches €2.5 million. However, the 27-year-old keeper is looking for an opportunity abroad.

On 29 July 2014, Glykos seemed to reach an agreement with PAOK for a three-year contract. As he started as the first choice for the starting XI in the 2014–15 season, Glykos gradually lost his place from Charles Itandje, as a result of strained abdominal muscle injury that kept him out of the team for a month.

He started the 2015–16 season, hoping that will be the indisputable first goalie for the club. On 1 July, PAOK decided to sign a contract with Robin Olsen, a Swedish international who seemed to be the first choice for the new PAOK coach Igor Tudor. Above all, in July 2015, PAOK goalkeeper Panagiotis Glykos picked an injury in his shoulder in the pre-season training and he is going to stay out from the first leg of the UEFA Europa League tie against Lokomotiva Zagreb, as has been confirmed by PAOK medical staff. Gradually, even if he did not start as Igor Tudor first option, he gained his place in the starting XI. Glykos was impressive at away 1–0 victory against Borussia Dortmund in the UEFA Europa League, but also suffered a second degree strain of rectus femoris. The Greek international will be out of action for 5/6 weeks according to medical staff. On 11 May 2016, in the first matchday for the 2015–16 play-offs Glykos returned to the field as a starter in a 2–1 home win game against rivals AEK Athens. On 21 November 2016, PAOK goalkeeper has renewed his contract until 2019. Glykos has been rewarded for his performances at PAOK by signing a new deal at the club, that will keep him at Toumba until 2019. He was among the stars of the club in 2016–17 season, as his skills are undeniable and eventually won his place in his starting line up. On 26 February 2017, in a 1–1 away draw against Iraklis, Glykos reached 100 appearances with the jersey of PAOK.

He started the 2016–17 playoffs as the undisputed first goalie of the club, despite his serious mistake during the 2017 Greek Cup final in the equalizing by Lazaros Christodoulopoulos. On 27 May 2017, during the training session, two weeks before the end of the season faced a cruciate ligament rupture that probably kept him out of the team for 6 months. Despite his injury, Glykos made his most mature season of his career (47 appearances in all competitions), with yet another special accolade, as he earned teammates' appreciation as he voted Players' Player of the Year.

On 11 February 2018, Glykos returned to the squad after a difficult recovery process (260 days to be exact) from his ruptured ACL injury. The 31-year-old goalie was included in the match squad ahead of Super League's home clash against AEL, but he will most likely remain on the bench at this match as Alexandros Paschalakis is in a great form. In the summer of 2019, PAOK announced the termination of the contract with the international goalie.

== International career ==
On 31 August 2012, Glykos was called to the national team for the first time by Fernando Santos. Panagiotis Glykos has made a late case for inclusion into the Greek squad, surprising many by usurping Michalis Sifakis, or even Alexandros Tzorvas to take the third goalkeeper spot behind Orestis Karnezis and Stefanos Kapino. He came to the tournament in solid form, keeping a clean sheet once every three league games during the 2013–14 season. Fernando Santos gave Glykos his debut back on 5 March 2014 in a friendly match against South Korea and was impressed enough to include him among his final 23 in Brazil.

After first-choice keeper Orestis Karnezis injured his back, Glykos came on as a substitute in the 24th minute for Greece in their World Cup match against the Ivory Coast in Brazil.

== Honours ==
PAOK

- Super League Greece: 2018–19
- Greek Cup: 2016–17, 2017–18, 2018–19

=== Individual ===
- PAOK MVP of the Season: 2016–17
