= Samuel Kyere =

Samuel Kyere may refer to:

- Samuel Kyere (footballer, born 1983), Ghanaian football striker
- Samuel Kyere (footballer, born 1992), Ghanaian football defender
