= Football at the 2003 All-Africa Games – Men's tournament =

2003 Men's All-Africa Games football tournament
Tournament details
- Host country: Nigeria
- City: Abuja
- Dates: 4–16 October 2003
- Teams: 8 (from 1 confederation)
- Venue: 3 (in 3 host cities)

Final positions
- Champions: Cameroon (3rd title)
- Runners-up: Nigeria
- Third place: Ghana
- Fourth place: Zambia

Tournament statistics
- Matches played: 16
- Goals scored: 41 (2.56 per match)

The 2003 All-Africa Games football – Men's tournament was the 8th edition of the African Games men's football tournament for men. The football tournament was held in Abuja, Nigeria between 4–16 October 2003 as part of the 2003 All-Africa Games.

== Qualifying ==
The following 8 nations qualified for men's play at the 2003 All Africa Games. Two teams qualify from Zone VI replacing Zone VII.

Zone	Team
Hosts	Nigeria
Zone I	Algeria
Zone II	Senegal
Zone III	Ghana
Zone IV	Cameroon
Zone V	Egypt
Zone VI	South Africa
Zone VI	Zambia
Zone VII	no team

== Final tournament ==
All times given as local time (UTC+1)

=== Group stage ===
Key to colours in group tables
Teams that advanced to the semifinals

==== Group A ====
Team	Pld	W	D	L	GF	GA	GD	Pts
Nigeria	3	3	0	0	7	0	+7	9
Zambia	3	2	0	1	4	4	0	6
Senegal	3	0	1	2	2	5	−3	1
South Africa	3	0	1	2	2	6	−4	1

4 October 2003

Nigeria	2–0	Zambia
Omo-Efe 7'; Okdoy 26'

Abubakar Tafawa Balewa Stadium, Bauchi
4 October 2003

Senegal	1–1	South Africa
Ndione 48' (pen.)		Mosaung

Abubakar Tafawa Balewa Stadium, Bauchi

7 October 2003

South Africa	0–3	Nigeria
		Omo-Efe 43', 65'; Okuduwa 44'

Abubakar Tafawa Balewa Stadium, Bauchi
7 October 2003

Zambia	2–1	Senegal
Mwewa 5'; Katongo 38'		Diarra 90'

Abubakar Tafawa Balewa Stadium, Bauchi

10 October 2003

Nigeria	2–0	Senegal
Izuagha 7' (pen.); Okuduwa 50'

Abubakar Tafawa Balewa Stadium, Bauchi
10 October 2003

Zambia	2–1	South Africa
Mwandila; Chalwe		Igesund

Abubakar Tafawa Balewa Stadium, Bauchi

==== Group B ====
Team	Pld	W	D	L	GF	GA	GD	Pts
Cameroon	3	2	1	0	7	3	+4	7
Ghana	3	1	2	0	2	1	+1	5
Algeria	3	1	1	1	3	4	−1	4
Egypt	3	0	0	3	2	6	−4	0

5 October 2003

Cameroon	3–1	Egypt
Essola 55' (pen.); Ndjock 72'; Ekwala 78'		Hamza 19'

U. J. Esuene Stadium, Calabar
5 October 2003

Algeria	0–0	Ghana

U. J. Esuene Stadium, Calabar

8 October 2003

Ghana	1–1	Cameroon
Ansah		Wansi 34'

U. J. Esuene Stadium, Calabar
8 October 2003

Egypt	1–2	Algeria
El Yamani 56' (pen.)		Bensaid 22' (pen.); Hamouda 42'

U. J. Esuene Stadium, Calabar

11 October 2003

Cameroon	3–1	Algeria
Wansi 22'; Mokaké 37', 47'		Hadji 39'

U. J. Esuene Stadium, Calabar
11 October 2003

Egypt	0–1	Ghana
		Ansah

U. J. Esuene Stadium, Calabar

=== Knockout stage ===
Semifinals
13 October – Bauchi
Nigeria	3
Ghana	0
13 October – Calabar
Cameroon	2
Zambia	1

Final
16 October – Abuja
Nigeria	0
Cameroon	2
Third place
15 October – Calabar
Ghana (p)	2 (4)
Zambia	2 (1)

==== Semi-finals ====
13 October 2003

Nigeria	3–0	Ghana
Omo-Efe 35'; Naftali 50'; Ejike (?)

Abubakar Tafawa Balewa Stadium, Bauchi

13 October 2003

Cameroon	2–1	Zambia
Mokaké 21', 88'		Mwandila 13'

U. J. Esuene Stadium, Calabar

==== Third place match ====
15 October 2003

Ghana	2–2	Zambia
Yahuza 16'; Shaibu 90'		Mumbi 28'; Mbesuma 72'
Penalties
	4–1

U. J. Esuene Stadium, Calabar

==== Final ====
16 October 2003

Nigeria	0–2	Cameroon
		Mokaké 44', 84'

National Stadium, Abuja

== Final ranking ==
Pos	Team	Pld	W	D	L	GF	GA	GD	Pts	Final result
1st place, gold medalist(s)	Cameroon	5	4	1	0	11	4	+7	13	Gold Medal
2nd place, silver medalist(s)	Nigeria (H)	5	4	0	1	10	2	+8	12	Silver Medal
3rd place, bronze medalist(s)	Ghana	5	1	3	1	4	6	−2	6	Bronze Medal
4	Zambia	5	2	1	2	7	8	−1	7	Fourth place
5	Algeria	3	1	1	1	3	4	−1	4	Eliminated in group stage
6	Senegal	3	0	1	2	2	5	−3	1	Eliminated in group stage
7	South Africa	3	0	1	2	2	6	−4	1	Eliminated in group stage
8	Egypt	3	0	0	3	2	6	−4	0	Eliminated in group stage

Source: todor66
(H) Hosts

== See also ==
- Football at the 2003 All-Africa Games – Women's tournament
