= Algeria at the Olympic Games Football Tournament =

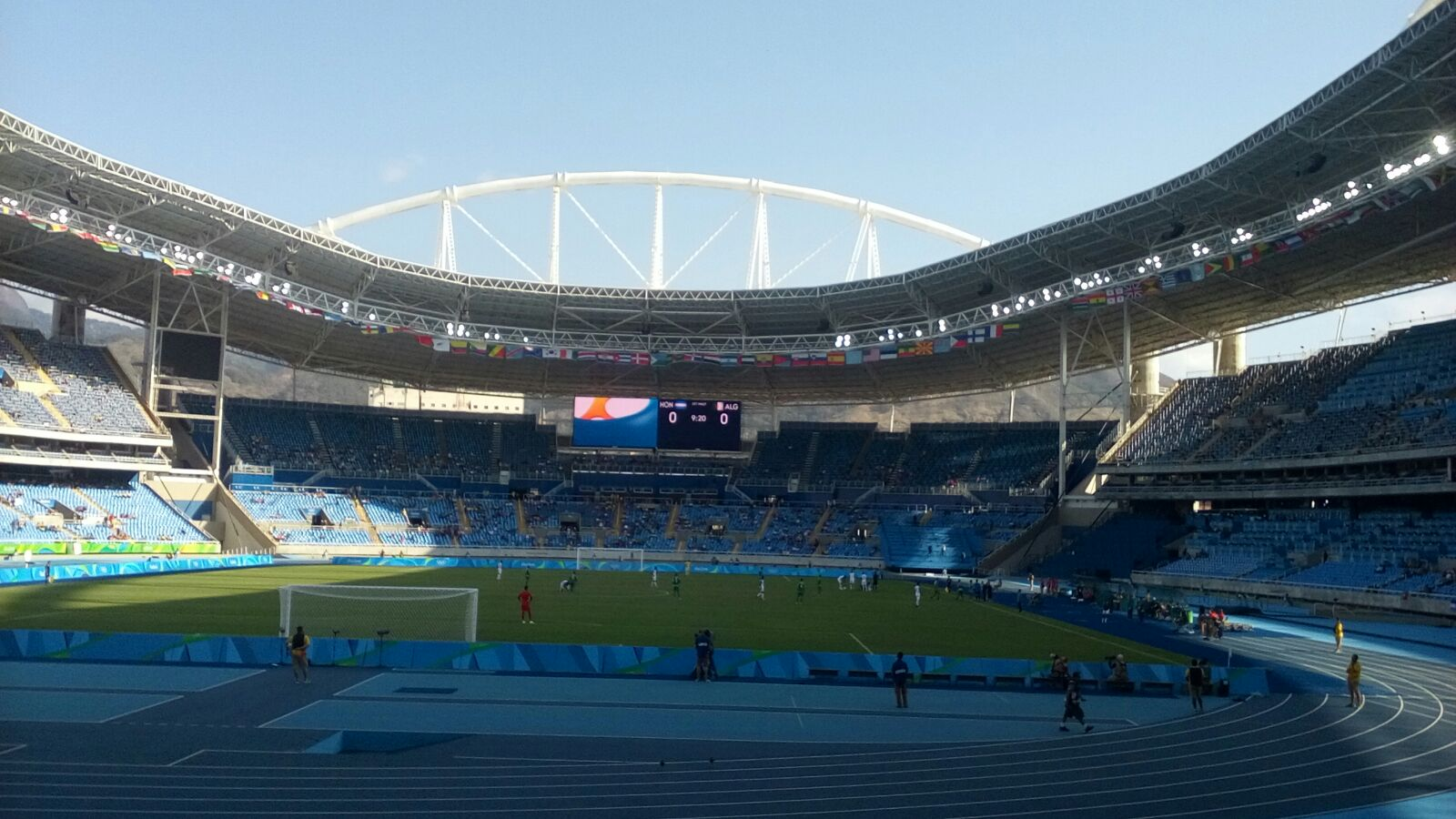
Algeria - Honduras at Rio 2016 Olympic Games Football

Algeria have appeared in the finals of the Summer Olympics Football Tournament on two occasions in 1980 with the Algeria first team and in 2016 with Algeria U23 after opening olympic football tournament to U23 national teams since 1992. They have once qualified for the knockout rounds, reaching the quarter-finals in 1980 before losing to Yugoslavia.

== Records ==
| Olympic Games | | | | | | | | | | Olympic Games Qualifications | | | | | | |
| Year | Result | Position | GP | W | D | L | GF | GA | Squad | Result | GP | W | D | L | GF | GA |
|---|---|---|---|---|---|---|---|---|---|---|---|---|---|---|---|---|
| (United Kingdom) 1908 – (Italy) 1960 | Part of France | | | | | | | | – | Part of France | | | | | | |
| (Japan) 1964 | Did not enter | | | | | | | | – | Did not enter | | | | | | |
| (Mexico) 1968 | Did not qualify | | | | | | | | – | 1968 OG Afr.Q (Round 3 "final") | 4 | 1 | 2 | 1 | 7 | 7 |
| (West Germany) 1972 | Did not qualify | | | | | | | | – | 1972 OG Afr.Q (Round 1) | 2 | 0 | 1 | 1 | 2 | 3 |
| (Canada) 1976 | Did not qualify | | | | | | | | – | 1976 OG Afr.Q (Round 1) | 2 | 0 | 1 | 1 | 2 | 3 |
| (Soviet Union) 1980 | Quarter-finals | 8th | 4 | 1 | 1 | 2 | 4 | 5 | Squad | 1980 OG Afr.Q (Round 3 "final") | 4 | 5* | 0 | 1 | 9 | 2 |
| (United States) 1984 | Did not qualify | | | | | | | | – | 1984 OG Afr.Q (Round 3 "final") | 6 | 2 | 1 | 3 | 8 | 8 |
| (South Korea) 1988 | Did not qualify | | | | | | | | – | 1988 OG Afr.Q (Round 3 "final") | 4 | 4* | 1 | 1 | 5 | 4 |
| (Spain) 1992 | Did not qualify | | | | | | | | – | 1992 OG Afr.Q (Round 2) | 2 | 0 | 1 | 1 | 0 | 1 |
| (United States) 1996 | Did not qualify | | | | | | | | – | 1996 OG Afr.Q (Round 1) | 2 | 0 | 1 | 1 | 1 | 3 |
| (Australia) 2000 | Did not qualify | | | | | | | | – | 2000 OG Afr.Q (Round 1) | 2 | 0 | 1 | 1 | 2 | 4 |
| (Greece) 2004 | Did not qualify | | | | | | | | – | 2004 OG Afr.Q (Round 2 "final") | 7 | 4* | 0 | 4 | 10 | 11 |
| (China) 2008 | Did not qualify | | | | | | | | – | 2008 OG Afr.Q (Round 2) | 4 | 2* | 1 | 1 | 2 | 4 |
| (United Kingdom) 2012 | Did not qualify | | | | | | | | – | 2011 CAF U-23 Champ. | 7 | 4 | 0 | 3 | 9 | 7 |
| (Brazil) 2016 | Group stage | 14th | 3 | 0 | 1 | 2 | 4 | 6 | Squad | 2015 Afcon U-23 | 7 | 3 | 3 | 1 | 8 | 3 |
| (Japan) 2020 | Did not qualify | | | | | | | | – | 2019 Afcon U-23 qualif. | 4 | 1 | 2 | 1 | 4 | 3 |
| (France) 2024 | Did not qualify | | | | | | | | – | 2023 Afcon U-23 qualif. | 2 | 0 | 1 | 1 | 1 | 2 |
| (United States) 2028 | To be determined | | | | | | | | – | To be determined | | | | | | |
| Total | Quarter-finals | 2/26 | 7 | 1 | 2 | 4 | 8 | 11 | - | 14/18 | 54 | 25 | 13 | 21 | 66 | 62 |

Prior to the Barcelona 1992 campaign, the Football at the Summer Olympics was open to full senior national teams.
*Algeria had won games by withdrawal.

== By match ==
By match
| Olympic Games | Round | Opponent | Score | Result | Scorers | Man of the match |
|---|---|---|---|---|---|---|
| 1980 | Group stage | Syria | 3–0 | W | Belloumi, Madjer, Merzekane | |
| 1980 | Group stage | East Germany | 0–1 | L | | |
| 1980 | Group stage | Spain | 1–1 | D | Belloumi | |
| 1980 | Quarter-finals | Yugoslavia | 0–3 | L | | |
| 2016 | Group stage | Honduras | 2–3 | L | Bendebka, Bounedjah | |
| 2016 | Group stage | Argentina | 1–2 | L | Bendebka | |
| 2016 | Group stage | Portugal | 1–1 | D | Benkablia | |

== Record by opponent ==
FIFA World Cup matches (by team)
| Opponent | GP | W | D | L | GF | GA |
AFC teams
| Syria | 1 | 1 | 0 | 0 | 3 | 0 |
CONCACAF teams
| Honduras | 1 | 0 | 0 | 1 | 2 | 3 |
CONMEBOL teams
| Argentina | 1 | 0 | 0 | 1 | 1 | 2 |
UEFA teams
| Germany* | 1 | 0 | 0 | 1 | 0 | 1 |
| Portugal | 1 | 0 | 1 | 0 | 1 | 1 |
| Spain | 1 | 0 | 1 | 0 | 1 | 1 |
| Yugoslavia | 1 | 0 | 0 | 1 | 0 | 3 |

* Games of East Germany are counted towards Germany.

== Participations ==
=== Algeria at Moscow 1980 ===
Group C

| Team | Pld | W | D | L | GF | GA | GD | Pts |
|---|---|---|---|---|---|---|---|---|
| East Germany | 3 | 2 | 1 | 0 | 7 | 1 | +6 | 5 |
| Algeria | 3 | 1 | 1 | 1 | 4 | 2 | +2 | 3 |
| Spain | 3 | 0 | 3 | 0 | 2 | 2 | 0 | 3 |
| Syria | 3 | 0 | 1 | 2 | 0 | 8 | −8 | 1 |

Source: FIFA
July 20, 1980
12:00

| Algeria | 3–0 | Syria |
|---|---|---|
| Belloumi 36'; Madjer 48'; Merzekane 73' (pen.) | Report |

Dinamo Stadium, Minsk
Referee: Vojtech Christov (Czechoslovakia)

July 22, 1980
12:00

| East Germany | 1–0 | Algeria |
|---|---|---|
| Terletzki 61' | Report |

Republican Stadium, Kyiv
Attendance: 70,000
Referee: Romualdo Arppi Filho (Brazil)

July 24, 1980
12:00

| Spain | 1–1 | Algeria |
|---|---|---|
| Rincón 38' | Report | Belloumi 63' |

Dinamo Stadium, Minsk
Referee: Eldar Azimzade (Soviet Union)

Quarter-finals

July 27, 1980
12:00

| Yugoslavia | 3–0 | Algeria |
|---|---|---|
| Miročević 5'; Šestić 19'; Vujović 70' | Report |

Dinamo Stadium, Minsk
Referee: Klaus Scheurell (East Germany)

=== Algeria at Rio de Janeiro 2016 ===
Group D

| Pos | Team | Pld | W | D | L | GF | GA | GD | Pts | Qualification |
|---|---|---|---|---|---|---|---|---|---|---|
| 1 | Portugal | 3 | 2 | 1 | 0 | 5 | 2 | +3 | 7 | Quarter-finals |
| 2 | Honduras | 3 | 1 | 1 | 1 | 5 | 5 | 0 | 4 | Quarter-finals |
| 3 | Argentina | 3 | 1 | 1 | 1 | 3 | 4 | −1 | 4 | |
| 4 | Algeria | 3 | 0 | 1 | 2 | 4 | 6 | −2 | 1 | |

Source: Rio2016 & FIFA
Rules for classification: Tiebreakers
4 August 2016
15:00

| Honduras | 3–2 | Algeria |
|---|---|---|
| Quioto 13'; Pereira 33'; Lozano 79' | Report (Rio2016); Report (FIFA) | Bendebka 68'; Bounedjah 85' |

Estádio Olímpico João Havelange, Rio de Janeiro
Attendance: 20,000
Referee: Sandro Ricci (Brazil)

7 August 2016
18:00

| Argentina | 2–1 | Algeria |
|---|---|---|
| Correa 47'; Calleri 70' | Report (Rio2016); Report (FIFA) | Bendebka 64' |

Estádio Olímpico João Havelange, Rio de Janeiro
Attendance: 37,450
Referee: Cüneyt Çakır (Turkey)

10 August 2016
13:00

| Algeria | 1–1 | Portugal |
|---|---|---|
| Benkablia 30' | Report (Rio2016); Report (FIFA) | Paciência 25' (pen.) |

Mineirão, Belo Horizonte
Attendance: 13,787
Referee: Matthew Conger (New Zealand)

== Goalscorers ==
| Rank | Player | 1980 | 2016 | Goals |
|---|---|---|---|---|
| 1 | Lakhdar Belloumi | 2 | | 2 |
| 1 | Sofiane Bendebka | | 2 | 2 |
| 3 | Mohamed Benkablia | | 1 | 1 |
| 3 | Baghdad Bounedjah | | 1 | 1 |
| 3 | Rabah Madjer | 1 | | 1 |
| 3 | Chaâbane Merzekane | 1 | | 1 |
| Total | | 4 | 4 | 8 |
