= Kostas Stafylidis =

Greek footballer (born 1993)

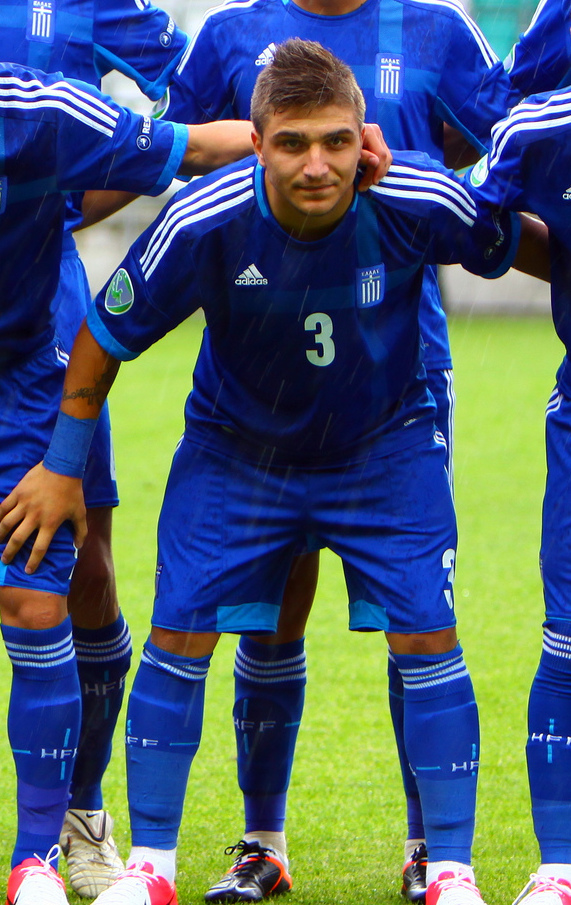
- Stafylidis with Greece U19 in 2012

Personal information
- Full name: Konstantinos Stafylidis
- Date of birth: 2 December 1993 (age 32)
- Place of birth: Thessaloniki, Greece
- Height: 1.78 m (5 ft 10 in)
- Position: Left-back

Team information
- Current team: APOEL
- Number: 3

Youth career
- 2006–2011: PAOK

Senior career*
| Years | Team | Apps | (Gls) |
| 2011–2013 | PAOK | 37 | (1) |
| 2013–2014 | Bayer Leverkusen II | 8 | (1) |
| 2013–2015 | Bayer Leverkusen | 1 | (0) |
| 2014–2015 | → Fulham (loan) | 38 | (0) |
| 2015–2019 | FC Augsburg | 52 | (5) |
| 2018 | → Stoke City (loan) | 5 | (0) |
| 2019–2022 | TSG Hoffenheim | 7 | (1) |
| 2021–2022 | → VfL Bochum (loan) | 27 | (0) |
| 2022–2023 | VfL Bochum | 19 | (0) |
| 2024 | Hansa Rostock | 11 | (0) |
| 2025– | APOEL | 26 | (2) |

International career^{‡}
| 2010 | Greece U17 | 1 | (0) |
| 2010–2012 | Greece U19 | 21 | (4) |
| 2013 | Greece U20 | 7 | (1) |
| 2012–2013 | Greece U21 | 10 | (0) |
| 2012–2020 | Greece | 32 | (2) |
Medal record
Men's football
Representing Greece
UEFA European Under-19 Championship
| Runner-up | 2012 Estonia |
- * Club domestic league appearances and goals as of 20 September 2026 ‡ National team caps and goals as of 13 May 2022

Konstantinos "Kostas" Stafylidis (Greek: Κώστας Σταφυλίδης; born 2 December 1993) is a Greek professional footballer who plays as a left-back for Cypriot First Division club APOEL. He has represented the Greece national team.

== Early career ==
Stafylidis started his football career at the age of 6, joining his village football team Aetos Akropotamou. At the age of 12, PAOK scouts recognized his talent, and he joined the club's academies. Stafylidis has played for all PAOK youth teams.

== Club career ==
=== PAOK ===
After rising through the youth ranks where he featured at every level, while also breaking into the Greek national youth set up after earning call-ups to the U17s and U19s starting in 2010, Stafylidis would make his full debut for the White-Blacks in autumn 2011 against Panetolikos, even registering the first assist of his full professional career in the same outing.

=== Bayer Leverkusen ===
In the summer of 2012 and after his good performance at the 2012 UEFA European Under-19 Football Championship, Stafylidis attracted attention from German club Bayer Leverkusen. After weeks of negotiations and due to PAOK's financial problems the team accepted a bid of €1.5 million from Leverkusen, but decided to stay for one more year as a loan, in his former club. Having failed to break into the first-team at the BayArena for the 2013–14 season, he was again chucked out on loan, this time to England where he would join up with Championship side Fulham.

==== Loan to Fulham ====
On 9 July 2014, Stafylidis joined Fulham, recently relegated to the EFL Championship, on a season-long loan. Fulham had the option to buy Stafylidis permanently at the end of his loan spell. He made 44 appearances with the club in all competitions. At the end of the season, he returned to Bayer Leverkusen.

=== FC Augsburg ===
Though he would return to Leverkusen, fellow Bundesliga outfit FC Augsburg would bring him to Bavaria in a deal worth £2.1 million as both Bundesliga clubs confirmed in official statements.

On 22 August 2015, he made his debut with the club in a 1–1 away draw against Eintracht Frankfurt. On 12 October 2015, Stafylidis was injured in the game against Hungary. "It's a minor injury. I will be out for 20 days", he mentioned. On 10 December 2015, he returned to the squad in a historic 3–1 away game against FK Partizan for UEFA Europa League. They needed to score three and win by a two-goal margin, they were understandably on the front foot from the get-go. On 6 February 2016, in an away 2–1 loss against Ingosltadt Stafylidis scored his first goal with the club with a wonderful kick, after taking the rebound outside the penalty area. It was his first goal for the season. On 25 February 2016, in the second leg of the last 32 of UEFA Europa League, Stafylidis one minute before the final whistle, curls his free-kick over the wall but just wide of the upright. That was almost curtains for Liverpool that with James Milner’s early penalty was enough to book their place in the last 16 of the Europa League for the first time in five years at the expense of Augsburg. Despite the move at the beginning of the 2015–16 campaign, Stafylidis would only go on to make sixteen total appearances (eleven in the Bundesliga) in what would be Markus Weinzierl’s final season in charge before moving to Schalke 04 the summer of 2016.

It has been under new boss Dirk Schuster that Stafylidis has been truly impressive during the 2016–17 campaign. On 11 September 2016, Stafylidis notched the fifth direct free-kick in Augsburg's Bundesliga history, helping his club to escape with a crucial 2–1 away win against Werder Bremen. On 18 September 2016, despite his goal in the equaliser a minute later Mainz restore their lead through Yunus Mallı's glancing header, in a frustrating 1–3 home loss. On 16 October 2016, the Greek international defender was the cause of Breel Embolo's severe injury as he broke the Schalke forward's ankle in a tackle, in Augsburg's clash with Schalke and the former has now apologised, stating he never meant to harm him. Switzerland international Embolo could be set to miss the rest of the season after sustaining the injury midway through the first half of 1–1 draw between the teams. Stafylidis, who was booked for the challenge, was quick to offer his condolences to the 19-year-old striker. On 23 February 2017, the club announced the extension of Stafylidis till the summer of 2019, for an undisclosed fee. On 3 March 2017, he opened the score with a fierce 30-yard strike, in a 2–2 home draw against RB Leipzig. On 18 March 2017, Stafylidis made Lukas Kübler look bad and heads a cross from Georg Teigl to the top of the second post equalizing the score in a 1–1 home draw against SC Freiburg. Stafylidis not only scored his fourth league goal of the 2016–17 season against the Black Forest outfit, but the Greek defender's set-pieces were also a constant source of worry for the visitors, who were perhaps lucky to escape the WWK Arena with a share of the spoils.

Despite his performance in the 2016–17 season, this year's first half counts for just 31 minutes of participation, as a substitute in two games against Eintracht Frankfurt and Bayern Munich, as he has fallen out of favour with manager Manuel Baum and a move is possible in January transfer window. He returned to Augsburg at the beginning of 2018–19 season, but he made his first appearance in the season on 23 December in a 2–3 home loss game against VfL Wolfsburg.

==== Loan to Stoke City ====
In January 2018, Stafylidis joined Premier League side Stoke City on loan until the end of the 2017–18 season, becoming new manager Paul Lambert's first signing. On 3 February 2018, he made his debut with the club as a late substitute for Badou Ndiaye in a 2–1 away loss against Bournemouth. A rib injury restricted Stafylidis to just five appearances for Stoke as the club suffered relegation to the EFL Championship.

=== TSG Hoffenheim ===
On 15 May 2019, Stafylidis will remain in the Bundesliga through 2023 after signing a contract with TSG Hoffenheim on a free transfer. Stafylidis spent the last four seasons with Augsburg, with a loan spell at Stoke City, and recorded 61 appearances, five goals, and three assists across all competitions. He is expected to take the place of Nico Schulz, who will likely make a move to Borussia Dortmund this summer. On 18 January 2020, he scored his first goal with the club with a kick in a 2–1 home loss against Eintracht Frankfurt. On 6 September 2020 he faced a shoulder injury that will keep him away of the squad for at least six months. On 23 February 2021, after a very difficult period for the defender marred by injury (167 days to be exact), he injured himself without any outside interference while training. A thorough examination has revealed that the Greek defender has suffered a fracture of the tibial plateau and will be out for several weeks.

=== VfL Bochum ===
In August 2021, he signed a season-long loan contract with German club VfL Bochum. On 21 August 2021, for almost 17 months without being even a change in a game, it came in as a substitute, in a 2–0 Bundesliga home win game against Mainz. The transfer was made permanent in July 2022.

=== Hansa Rostock ===
On 1 February 2024, Stafylidis signed with Hansa Rostock until the end of the season.

=== APOEL ===
On 20 June 2025, Stafylidis signed a two-year contract with Cypriot First Division club APOEL.

== International career ==
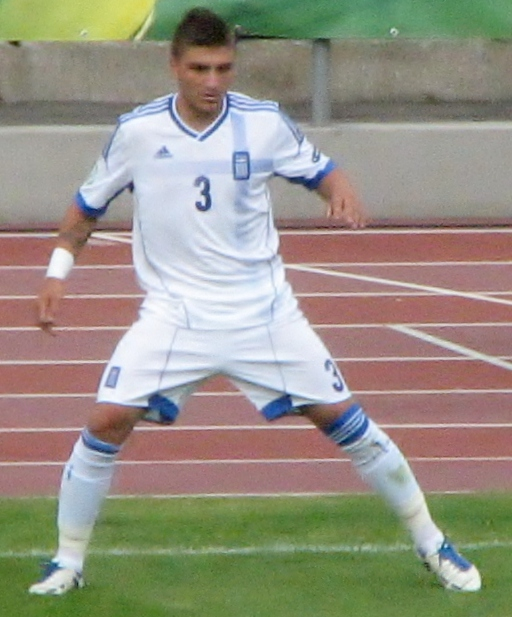
Stafylidis playing for Greece under-19s against Estonia under-19s in July 2012

He also played a major role in the Greek squad at the Under-19 European Champions and won a runners-up medal, after losing 1–0 to Spain U19, being named to the team of the tournament. Stafylidis made his debut with Greece national football team in a friendly match against Republic of Ireland on 14 November 2012, in which Greece won 1–0. On 11 October 2015, he scored his first goal with Greece in a 4–3 home win against Hungary when he opened the score, scoring their first home goal of the campaign as he turned in a cross from Stelios Kitsiou at close range in the fifth minute. On 10 October 2016, an exact year after his first goal, he scored from a free kick with a left footed shot to the bottom left corner, sealing a 2–0 away 2018 FIFA World Cup qualification win against Estonia.

== Career statistics ==
=== Club ===
As of 12 April 2026

Appearances and goals by club, season and competition
| Club | Season | League | | | National cup | | Europe | | Other | | Total | |
| Club | Season | Division | Apps | Goals | Apps | Goals | Apps | Goals | Apps | Goals | Apps | Goals |
|---|---|---|---|---|---|---|---|---|---|---|---|---|
| PAOK | 2011–12 | Super League Greece | 16 | 0 | 1 | 0 | 3 (Note: Appearances in the UEFA Europa League) | 0 | 0 | 0 | 20 | 0 |
| PAOK | 2012–13 | Super League Greece | 21 | 1 | 3 | 1 | 0 | 0 | 0 | 0 | 24 | 2 |
| PAOK | Total | | 37 | 1 | 4 | 1 | 3 | 0 | 0 | 0 | 44 | 2 |
| Bayer Leverkusen | 2013–14 | Bundesliga | 1 | 0 | 0 | 0 | 0 | 0 | 0 | 0 | 1 | 0 |
| Bayer Leverkusen II | 2013–14 | Regionalliga West | 8 | 1 | — | | — | | 0 | 0 | 8 | 1 |
| Fulham | 2014–15 | Championship | 38 | 0 | 4 | 0 | — | | 2 (Note: Appearances in the English League Cup) | 0 | 44 | 0 |
| FC Augsburg | 2015–16 | Bundesliga | 11 | 1 | 1 | 0 | 4 | 0 | 0 | 0 | 16 | 1 |
| FC Augsburg | 2016–17 | Bundesliga | 27 | 4 | 2 | 0 | — | | 0 | 0 | 29 | 4 |
| FC Augsburg | 2017–18 | Bundesliga | 2 | 0 | 0 | 0 | — | | 0 | 0 | 2 | 0 |
| FC Augsburg | 2018–19 | Bundesliga | 12 | 0 | 2 | 0 | — | | 0 | 0 | 14 | 0 |
| FC Augsburg | Total | | 52 | 5 | 5 | 0 | 4 | 0 | 0 | 0 | 61 | 5 |
| Stoke City (loan) | 2017–18 | Premier League | 5 | 0 | 0 | 0 | — | | — | | 5 | 0 |
| TSG Hoffenheim | 2019–20 | Bundesliga | 7 | 1 | 0 | 0 | — | | — | | 7 | 1 |
| TSG Hoffenheim | 2020–21 | Bundesliga | 0 | 0 | 0 | 0 | 0 | 0 | — | | 0 | 0 |
| TSG Hoffenheim | Total | | 7 | 1 | 0 | 0 | 0 | 0 | — | | 7 | 1 |
| VfL Bochum (loan) | 2021–22 | Bundesliga | 24 | 0 | 2 | 0 | — | | — | | 26 | 0 |
| VfL Bochum | 2022–23 | Bundesliga | 19 | 0 | 0 | 0 | — | | — | | 19 | 0 |
| VfL Bochum | Total | | 43 | 0 | 2 | 0 | 0 | 0 | — | | 45 | 0 |
| Hansa Rostock | 2023–24 | 2. Bundesliga | 11 | 0 | 0 | 0 | — | | — | | 11 | 0 |
| APOEL | 2025–26 | Cypriot First Division | 20 | 0 | 1 | 0 | — | | — | | 21 | 0 |
| Career total | | | 222 | 8 | 15 | 1 | 7 | 0 | 2 | 0 | 247 | 9 |

=== International ===
As of 6 September 2020

Appearances and goals by national team and year
| National team | Year | Apps | Goals |
|---|---|---|---|
| Greece | 2012 | 1 | 0 |
| Greece | 2013 | 0 | 0 |
| Greece | 2014 | 1 | 0 |
| Greece | 2015 | 4 | 1 |
| Greece | 2016 | 9 | 1 |
| Greece | 2017 | 7 | 0 |
| Greece | 2018 | 2 | 0 |
| Greece | 2019 | 7 | 0 |
| Greece | 2020 | 1 | 0 |
| Total | | 32 | 2 |

As of match played 10 October 2016
Scores and results list Greece's goal tally first, score column indicates score after each Stafylidis goal.

List of international goals scored by Kostas Stafylidis
| No. | Date | Venue | Cap | Opponent | Score | Result | Competition | Ref. |
|---|---|---|---|---|---|---|---|---|
| 1 | 11 October 2015 | Karaiskakis Stadium, Piraeus, Greece | 6 | Hungary | 1–0 | 4–3 | UEFA Euro 2016 qualifying | |
| 2 | 10 October 2016 | A. Le Coq Arena, Tallinn, Estonia | 13 | Estonia | 2–0 | 2–0 | 2018 FIFA World Cup qualification | |

== Honours ==
Greece U19

- UEFA European Under-19 Championship runner-up: 2012

Individual

- UEFA European Under-19 Championship Team of the Tournament: 2012
