= Lawrence Owino =

Kenyan footballer

Personal information
- Date of birth: 15 October 1982 (age 44)
- Position: Midfielder

Senior career*
Years	Team	Apps	(Gls)
2002–2014	Ulinzi Stars		

International career^{‡}
2001–2009	Kenya	9	(0)
- * Club domestic league appearances and goals as of 25 April 2021 ‡ National team caps and goals as of 25 April 2021

Lawrence Owino (born 15 October 1982) is a retired Kenyan football midfielder who played for Ulinzi Stars.
