= Daniel Wansi =

Cameroonian footballer (1982–2024)

Personal information
- Full name: Daniel Jules Oscar Wansi
- Date of birth: 22 February 1982
- Place of birth: Yaoundé, Cameroon
- Date of death: 1 August 2024 (aged 42)
- Place of death: Yaoundé, Cameroon
- Height: 1.85 m (6 ft 1 in)
- Position: Striker

Senior career*
Years	Team	Apps	(Gls)
–2001	Cintra Yaoundé		
2001–2003	ES Sahel		
2003	Inker Zaprešić	6	(0)
2004	Al-Nasr Dubai		
2004–2005	Dynamo Dresden	28	(0)
2006	Shenzhen Kingway	14	(1)
2006–2008	RAEC Mons	12	(0)
2008–2009	Budućnost Podgorica		
2009–2010	Cintra Yaoundé		
2011	El Gouna	2	(0)

International career
2003	Cameroon U23		
Medal record
Men's association football
Representing Cameroon
African Games
Gold medal – first place	2003 Abuja	Team
- * Club domestic league appearances and goals

Daniel Wansi (22 February 1982 – 1 August 2024) was a Cameroonian professional footballer who played as a striker.

== Career ==
When Wansi was nineteen and playing in Cameroon's Cintra Yaoundé, he won the 2001 "Crack d’Or", best Cameroon's footballer of the year.

He played for Croatian First League club Inker Zaprešić in autumn 2003.

He trialled at Xiamen Lanshi in February 2006. He then played for Shenzhen Kingway.

In December 2007 he moved to Montenegrin First League club FK Budućnost Podgorica.

Wansi was part of the Cameroon U23 national team that won the 2003 All-Africa Games.

== Death ==
Wansi died in Yaoundé on 1 August 2024, at the age of 42.

== External sources ==
- Daniel Wansi at WorldFootball.net
- Stats from 1HNL at HRrepka.
