= Kwadwo Poku (footballer, born 1985) =

Ghanaian footballer

Kojo Poku
Personal information
- Full name: Kwadwo Gyamfi-Poku
- Date of birth: 5 May 1985 (age 41)
- Place of birth: Kumasi, Ghana
- Height: 1.73 m (5 ft 8 in)
- Position: Striker

Youth career
- 1998–2000: Asante Kotoko

Senior career*
Years	Team	Apps	(Gls)
2000–2003	Asante Kotoko	-	(-)
2001–2002	Bofoakwa Tano	-	(-)
2003–2004	King Faisal Babes	17	(8)
2004–2006	Midtjylland	27	(3)
2006–2007	Ikast fS	18	(8)
2007–2012	Asante Kotoko	-	(-)
2008	→ King Faisal Babes (loan)	-	(-)
2009	→ Cornerstones (loan)	-	(-)
2012	Skive	1	(0)
2012	Tjørring	-	(-)
2013	Ringkøbing	-	(-)
2013–2015	Sekondi Hasaacas	8	(3)

International career
2004–2008	Ghana	9	(2)
- * Club domestic league appearances and goals

Kwadwo Gyamfi-Poku (born 5 May 1985), or simply Kojo Poku, is a Ghanaian former professional footballer who played as a striker.

== Career ==
Poku began his career by Asante Kotoko, the former Ghana Olympic striker came to prominence in 2002 when he was promoted from the junior team of Kotoko and succeeded in making an immediate impact in Kotoko's journey to the finals of the 2002 African Cup Winner Cup, which they eventually lost to Wydad Casablanca of Morocco in the final.

Poku moved to Danish side FC Midtjylland on 15 May 2005, with a huge of potential from local side King Faisal Babes in 2004. In the 2006–07 season he played eighteen games and scores 8 goals for the farmteam Ikast fS. He was released from his Midtjylland contract on 13 April 2007, and signed for Asante Kotoko on 13 August 2007. He scored a brace in a 2–2 draw against Liberty Professionals. After one year with Kotoko he returned to King Faisal Babes, signing for the Kumasi based club in April 2008. He played half a year for King Faisal Babes before joining city rivals Cornerstones F.C. on loan. In September 2009 Poku returned to Asante Kotoko from his loan.

In February 2012, Poku moved to Danish 1st Division side Skive IK, before signing with Tjørring IF in the August 2012. He would then move to Ringkøbing IF in January 2013.

He returned to Ghana to sign with Sekondi Hasaacas in July 2013. He has since retired.

== International career ==
Poku was part of the Ghanaian 2004 Olympic football team which exited in the first round, having finished in third place in group B. He was member of the Ghana national team and played eight games and scored two goals. He played his first game in 2004 and the last match in 2006, on 27 September 2008 was recalled for the game against Lesotho.

In 2016, Poku made allegations against senior officials of the Ghana national team, claiming that they took bribes from players to be selected for the team.

== Honours ==
Asante Kotoko

- Ghana Premier League: 2003, 2007–08
- SWAG Cup: 2003
- GHALCA/LG Cup: 2003
