= Miguel Villarejo =

Spanish footballer (born 1988)

Personal information
- Full name: Miguel Villarejo de Castro
- Date of birth: 24 August 1988 (age 38)
- Place of birth: Baños de la Encina, Spain
- Height: 1.71 m (5 ft 7 in)
- Position: Left back

Team information
- Current team: Linares Deportivo
- Number: 3

Youth career
- Córdoba

Senior career*
Years	Team	Apps	(Gls)
2007–2009	Córdoba B	57	(1)
2009–2010	Alcalá	32	(0)
2010–2012	Rayo Vallecano B	62	(1)
2012–2013	Panthrakikos	6	(1)
2013	→ Kallithea (loan)	26	(0)
2013–2014	Panachaiki	4	(0)
2014	Iraklis Psachna	6	(0)
2014–2016	Cultural Leonesa	48	(1)
2016–2017	Coruxo	21	(0)
2017–2018	Talavera	31	(0)
2018–2020	Racing Club de Ferrol	20	(0)
2020–	Linares Deportivo	11	(0)
- * Club domestic league appearances and goals as of 21 March 2021

Miguel Villarejo de Castro (born 24 August 1988) is a Spanish footballer who plays for Linares Deportivo as a left back.
