= Narcisse Fish Abada =

Cameroonian footballer

Fish Abada
Personal information
- Full name: Narcisse Fish Abada
- Date of birth: January 12, 1982 (age 44)
- Place of birth: Ayos, Cameroon
- Height: 1.86 m (6 ft 1 in)
- Position: Midfielder

Senior career*
Years	Team	Apps	(Gls)
1998-2000	Foudre d'Aconolinga		
2000-2001	Fenerbahçe Yaoundé		
2002	Etoile Essazok		
2003-2004	Tonnerre Yaounde		
2005-2006	Union Douala		
2006–2007	KF Tirana	15	(0)
2007-2008	Flamurtari	14	(0)
2008	Hibernians	6	(0)
2012-2013	SC Kriens	16	(1)

International career
2003	Cameroon U23	1	(1)
- * Club domestic league appearances and goals

Narcisse Fish Abada (born January 12, 1982) is a Cameroonian former professional footballer who played as a midfielder.

== Club career ==
Abada played for Cameroonian top sides Union Douala and Tonnerre Yaounde before moving to Albanian teams KF Tirana and then KS Flamurtari Vlorë. In the January 2008 transfer window he signed for Hibernians.
