= Jacobo Sanz =

Spanish footballer (born 1983)

Jacobo
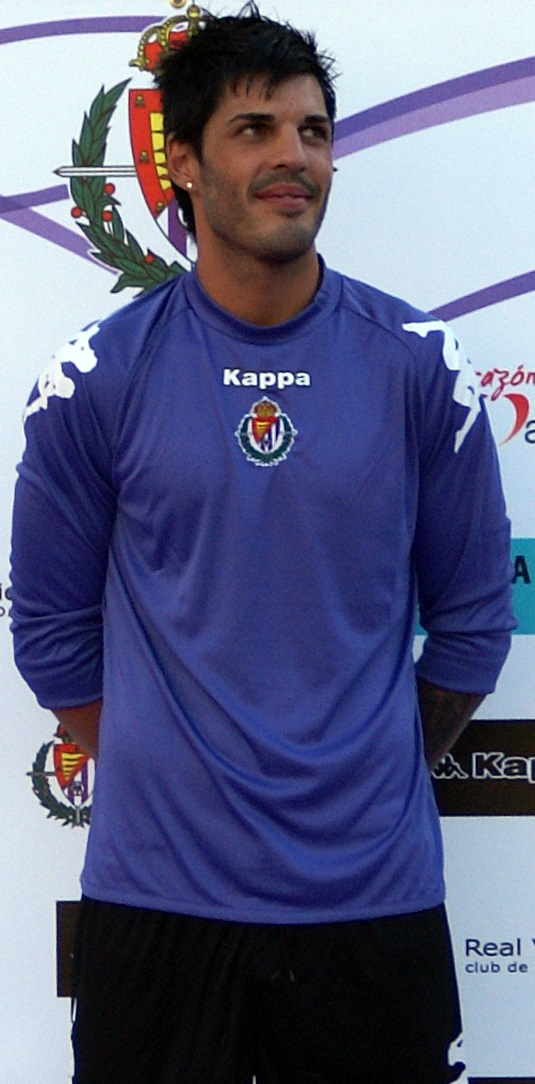
- Jacobo with Valladolid in 2011

Personal information
- Full name: Jacobo Sanz Ovejero
- Date of birth: 10 July 1983 (age 43)
- Place of birth: Valladolid, Spain
- Height: 1.93 m (6 ft 4 in)
- Position: Goalkeeper

Youth career
- Colegio San Agustín
- 1990–2003: Valladolid

Senior career*
Years	Team	Apps	(Gls)
2003–2006	Valladolid B	26	(0)
2004	→ Palencia (loan)	6	(0)
2005	→ Jaén (loan)	4	(0)
2005–2007	Valladolid	10	(0)
2007–2008	Numancia	32	(0)
2008–2011	Valladolid	36	(0)
2008–2009	→ Getafe (loan)	17	(0)
2011–2012	Asteras Tripolis	22	(0)
2012–2015	PAOK	21	(0)
2014	→ Tenerife (loan)	5	(0)
Total		179	(0)
- * Club domestic league appearances and goals

Jacobo Sanz Ovejero (born 10 July 1983), known simply as Jacobo, is a Spanish former professional footballer who played as a goalkeeper.

A controversial figure, he played 68 Segunda División matches over five seasons, representing Valladolid, Numancia and Tenerife in the competition. He appeared for Getafe and Valladolid in La Liga, and also competed professionally in Greece.

== Career ==
=== Valladolid and Numancia ===
Jacobo was born in Valladolid. A product of Real Valladolid's youth system – he joined the club at the age of only seven – he served two loan stints before returning in the 2005–06 season, with the Castile and León club in Segunda División. He would only be third choice during that period, and his official debut occurred on 1 October 2005 in a 3–2 away win over Real Madrid Castilla; his second league game was also against that opponent, five months later (1–0 home victory).

In 2007–08, Jacobo contributed 32 games to CD Numancia's return to La Liga after a three-year absence. He had been signed to a two-year deal with Valladolid keeping two re-buy options on the player, and conceded just 28 goals during the campaign, only trailing CD Castellón's Carlos Sánchez in the Ricardo Zamora Trophy race.

=== Getafe ===
Jacobo returned to Valladolid in July 2008, signing a new three-year contract. However, injuries to Getafe CF's keepers, Argentines Roberto Abbondanzieri (a couple of weeks) and Oscar Ustari (eight months) prompted a loan request by the Madrid side, which was accepted. On 14 September, after having received the latter's nº1 jersey, he made his debut for the club, keeping a clean sheet in a 0–0 home draw with Real Betis.

From January 2009 onwards, as Abbondanzieri returned to Boca Juniors, Jacobo was reinstated as starter, first appearing on the 25th in a 5–1 home win against Sporting de Gijón. In 2009–10 he alternated with Paraguayan Justo Villar when healthy, but Valladolid finished 18th with 62 goals against (the fourth-worst defensive record) and dropped down back to the second division.

=== Greece ===
In July 2011, after a failed transfer to Celtic – the Scottish team had already shown interest in the player the previous summer– Jacobo joined several compatriots at Asteras Tripolis F.C. in Greece, signing a two-year contract. On 27 November, he was named Player of the match in a 2–0 home defeat of Olympiacos FC.

On 21 April 2012, after the Super League season was over, Jacobo was released by Asteras supposedly to move to Everton in England, and had subsequent trials in the country with Charlton Athletic and Middlesbrough in the ensuing summer. Nothing came of it and, eventually, he stayed in Greece and joined PAOK FC for one year.

On 18 November 2012, Jacobo was sent off in a game against Panathinaikos F.C. and, subsequently, was subjected to the club's disciplinary proceedings, being reinstated after issuing an apology. In June of the following year he renewed his contract for three more years but, in November, after a new case of misconduct, this time involving the club's trainer, was again suspended. Coach Huub Stevens commented on the incident: “There was an incident in yesterday’s training. Believe me, patience is the best way to deal with such matters, but it was not the first time he overreacted and that is unacceptable. That’s why we banned him from training until Monday. I hope he will reflect on his behaviour and learn from it”.

Jacobo was loaned to CD Tenerife back in his country for the 2014–15 campaign. On 14 November, however, he left the club after having a confrontation with teammate Cristo González, also being deemed surplus to requirements at PAOK.

On 17 January 2017, after years battling several injury problems, the 33-year-old Jacobo announced his retirement. He expressed a desire to remain connected to the sport as a goalkeeper coach, and started working in that capacity with Internacional de Madrid and Aarhus Gymnastikforening.

== Career statistics ==
Appearances and goals by club, season and competition
Club	Season	League			National cup		Europe		Other		Total	
Club	Season	Division	Apps	Goals	Apps	Goals	Apps	Goals	Apps	Goals	Apps	Goals
Valladolid B	2005–06	Segunda División B	26	0	—		—		—		26	0
Palencia (loan)	2004–05	Segunda División B	6	0	—		—		—		6	0
Jaén (loan)	2004–05	Segunda División B	4	0	—		—		—		4	0
Valladolid	2005–06	Segunda División	3	0	0	0	—		—		3	0
Valladolid	2006–07	Segunda División	7	0	5	0	—		—		12	0
Valladolid	Total		10	0	5	0	—		—		15	0
Numancia	2007–08	Segunda División	32	0	1	0	—		—		10	0
Valladolid	2009–10	La Liga	15	0	0	0	—		—		15	0
Valladolid	2010–11	Segunda División	21	0	2	0	—		0	0	23	0
Valladolid	Total		36	0	2	0	—		0	0	38	0
Getafe (loan)	2008–09	La Liga	17	0	2	0	—		—		19	0
Asteras Tripolis	2011–12	Super League Greece	22	0	1	0	—		—		23	0
PAOK	2012–13	Super League Greece	10	0	1	0	0	0	—		11	0
PAOK	2013–14	Super League Greece	11	0	0	0	8	0	—		19	0
PAOK	Total		21	0	1	0	8	0	—		30	0
Tenerife (loan)	2014–15	Segunda División	5	0	0	0	—		—		5	0
Career total			179	0	12	0	8	0	0	0	199	0

== Honours ==
Valladolid

- Segunda División: 2006–07

Numancia

- Segunda División: 2007–08
