= Samuel Kyere (footballer, born 1983) =

Ghanaian footballer

Sam Kyere
Personal information
- Full name: Samuel Kyere
- Date of birth: June 6, 1983 (age 43)
- Place of birth: Berekum, Ghana
- Height: 1.78 m (5 ft 10 in)
- Position: Striker

Team information
- Current team: Berekum Chelsea
- Number: 17

Senior career*
Years	Team	Apps	(Gls)
2001–2003	Berekum Arsenal		
2003–2005	Haras El Hodood		
2005–2007	El-Ittihad El-Iskandary		
2007–2008	Al-Mokawloon al-Arab	32	(4)
2009–2011	Ittihad El-Shorta	31	(3)
2011–2012	El-Ittihad El-Iskandary	9	(2)
2012–	Berekum Chelsea		

International career^{‡}
2008–2009	Ghana	3	(0)
- * Club domestic league appearances and goals ‡ National team caps and goals as of June 28, 2008

Samuel Kyere (born June 6, 1983, in Berekum) is a Ghanaian football striker. He currently plays for Berekum Chelsea.

== International ==
Kyere played his first match for the senior side Black Stars in 2008, he played the game on 19 November against Tunisia national football team.
