= Charles Itandje =

Cameroonian-French footballer (born 1982)

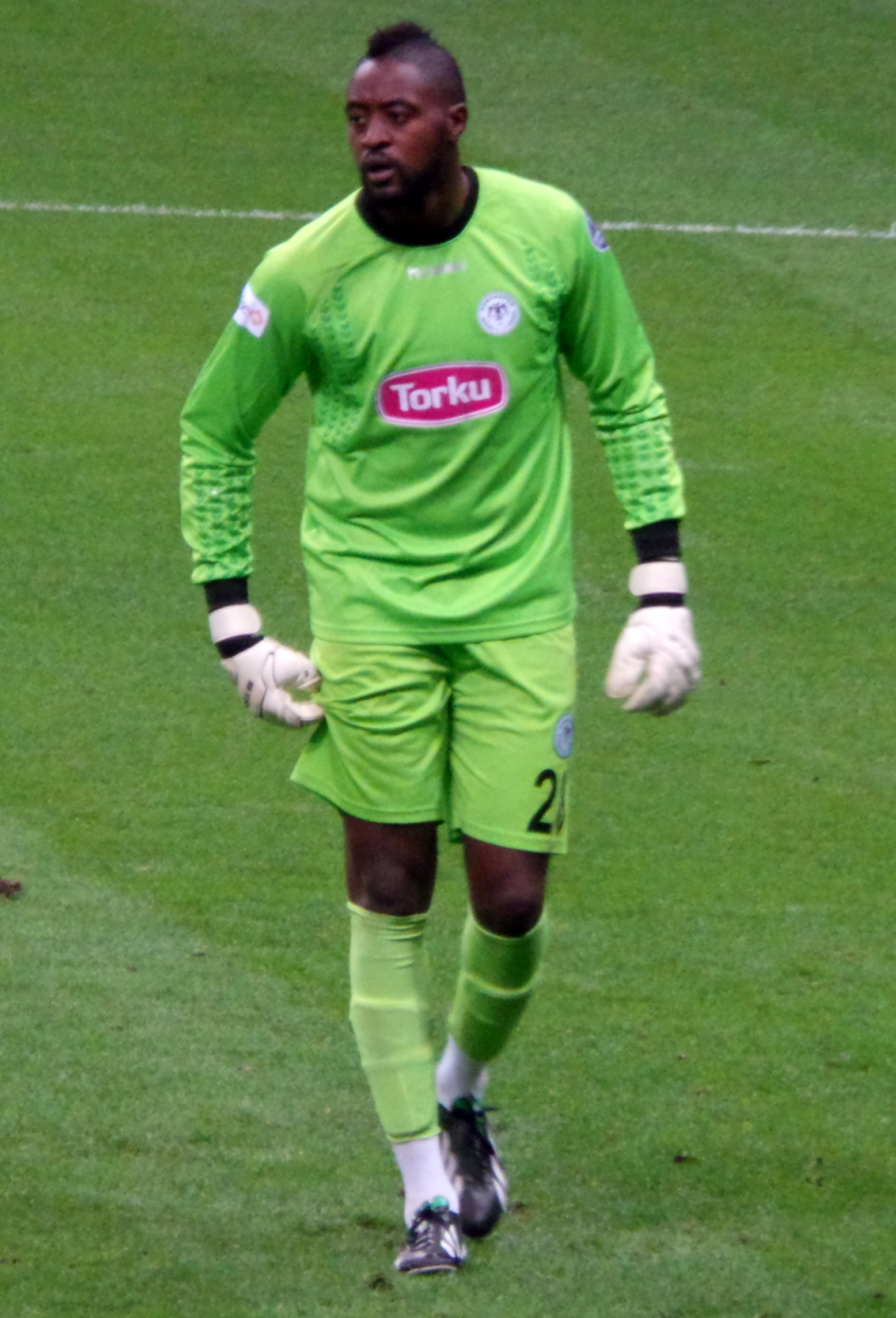
- Itandje playing for Konyaspor in 2013

Personal information
- Full name: Charles Hubert Itandje
- Date of birth: 2 November 1982 (age 44)
- Place of birth: Bobigny, France
- Height: 1.93 m (6 ft 4 in)
- Position: Goalkeeper

Youth career
- 1997–2000: Red Star

Senior career*
Years	Team	Apps	(Gls)
2000–2001	Red Star	9	(0)
2001–2007	Lens	171	(0)
2007–2010	Liverpool	0	(0)
2009–2010	→ Kavala (loan)	19	(0)
2010–2013	Atromitos	57	(0)
2013–2015	PAOK	35	(0)
2013–2014	→ Konyaspor (loan)	33	(0)
2015–2016	Çaykur Rizespor	33	(0)
2016–2017	Gaziantepspor	5	(0)
2017	Adanaspor	12	(0)
2018–2019	Versailles	7	(0)
Total		381	(0)

International career
2002–2003	France U21	6	(0)
2013–2014	Cameroon	12	(0)
- * Club domestic league appearances and goals

Charles Hubert Itandje (born 2 November 1982) is a retired professional footballer who played as a goalkeeper. Born in France, Itandje represented the Cameroon national team. Itandje has kept goal for professional football clubs in France, England, Greece and Turkey.

== Club career ==
=== Lens ===
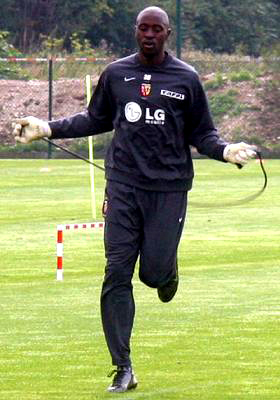
Itandje with Lens

Born in Bobigny (a suburb of Paris) of Cameroonian descent, Itandje began his professional career at French club RC Lens in 2001, for whom he made 170 league appearances and 21 appearances in European games. Lens were prepared to allow Itandje to leave for Liverpool after they signed two goalkeepers in the summer of 2007, saying: "The directors of Lens have concluded the definitive sale of Charles Itandje to Liverpool Football Club. The Lens goalkeeper leaves Lens after six years of good and loyal service."

=== Liverpool ===
Itandje signed for Liverpool in August 2007, as cover for Pepe Reina, thus allowing Scott Carson to join Aston Villa on a season-long loan to play regularly. Itandje said of his move: "At Liverpool there is a very good keeper who has been there three years. I am clearly going to be number 2. But, there are 60 matches a season and it is planned that I will play the League Cup and FA Cup." He made his first team debut for Liverpool in a League Cup match against Reading on 25 September, which Liverpool won 4–2, and in total, made three League Cup appearances and four FA Cup appearances for Liverpool in the 2007–08 season.

He was made available for transfer in the summer of 2008 after Liverpool signed Diego Cavalieri but turned down a move to Galatasaray. He made no further appearances for Liverpool and by January 2009 was seeking to leave the club.

On 30 June 2010, Itandje returned to Liverpool. His contract with Liverpool was due to expire in January 2011 and he was at least fifth in the goalkeeping order, behind Pepe Reina, Brad Jones, Péter Gulácsi and Martin Hansen. Upon his return, he was criticised by John Aldridge for "collecting his wages" rather than looking for a different club where he would have a chance of playing. In total for Liverpool, Itandje played 7 times.

==== Hillsborough memorial incident ====
After the memorial service for the twentieth anniversary of the Hillsborough disaster in April 2009, complaints were made by members of the congregation that Itandje had been laughing and behaving inappropriately during the service. His actions were condemned by the Liverpool hierarchy, who stated that they would be seeking to impose the maximum punishment possible. Itandje apologised to the grieving families and to Liverpool fans for his behaviour and was suspended by the club for 14 days. He did not play another game, at reserve or first team level, for the club.

In an exclusive interview with Le Journal du Dimanche, Itandje spoke out about the Hillsborough incident for the first time. He said when he saw himself laughing on television, he described this as "awkward and unwelcome." As a result of this, Itandje stated the club never supported him for this and the club supporters started to threaten him saying: "Do not walk in the street, you'll get mugged." His increasing stress caused him to have eczema on his hand.

Following his move to Atromitos, Itandje apologised emphatically:

I am sorry. I am sorry. I am sorry. A thousand times, I am sorry. To the club, to the fans and especially to the families, I am deeply sorry.

=== Kavala and Atromitos ===
On 29 August 2009, Itandje moved on loan at Kavala for the whole of the season despite interests from La Liga side Málaga and Sporting de Gijón. Upon joining Kavala, Itandje says joining the club describes the experience as "exotic in a fairly ambitious club" and "unlike anything I have experienced" club. There is no fitness centre, no training centre. After being a second choice goalkeeper, Itandje managed to beat off competitions from veteran goalkeeper Željko Kalac to become a first choice goalkeeper. Itandje went on to make 19 appearances for Kavala and Itandje also made 9 clean sheets for the club.

On 8 December 2010, it was announced that Itandje would be leaving Liverpool, being released from his contract. He joined Greek club Atromitos on a free transfer on 1 January 2011. Upon his departure from Liverpool, Newspaper Liverpool Echo were relieved of finally getting rid of Itandje. Since joining Greece permanently, Itandje have become the first choice goalkeeper throughout his Atromitos career.

He started the Greek Cup final for Atromitos who lost 3–0 to AEK Athens at the OAKA stadium in Athens and also started in another Greek Cup final for Atromitos, which they lost 2–1 to Olympiacos at the OAKA stadium in Athens for the second time, which Atromitos played in. Despite losing the Greek Cup, Itandje, nevertheless, helped the club reach fifth place, which resulted in a qualification in the Europa League. In the Europa League Qualification Round against Newcastle United, Itandje played in both legs, as Newcastle United win 2–1 on aggregate, thus putting Atromitos out of the Europa League.

During his time at Atromitos, Itandje credited Georgios Donis on helping him, quoting: "I am very proud that my coach says very good things about me. For this I came to the group. O Donis brought me much because he believed in me and told me to come in Atromitos."

=== PAOK ===
On 29 January 2013, Itandje signed a two-year contract with PAOK, where he will be wearing number 27 shirt, as well as, rejoining Donis.

On 10 July 2013, he signed a one-year contract on loan with Turkish side Konyaspor from PAOK. He made his debut, in the opening game of the season, in a 3–2 win over Fenerbahçe. He became the first choice goalkeeper throughout the season at Konyaspor and kept nine clean sheets in 39 appearances.

He returned to PAOK after his loan to Konyaspor and during the second half of the 2014–15 season became the first choice goalkeeper helping the club to improve its performance, especially after the advent of the new coach, Georgios Charalambous Georgiadis.

=== Versailles ===
On 17 August 2018, it was reported that Itandje had signed for National 3 side Versailles.

== International career ==
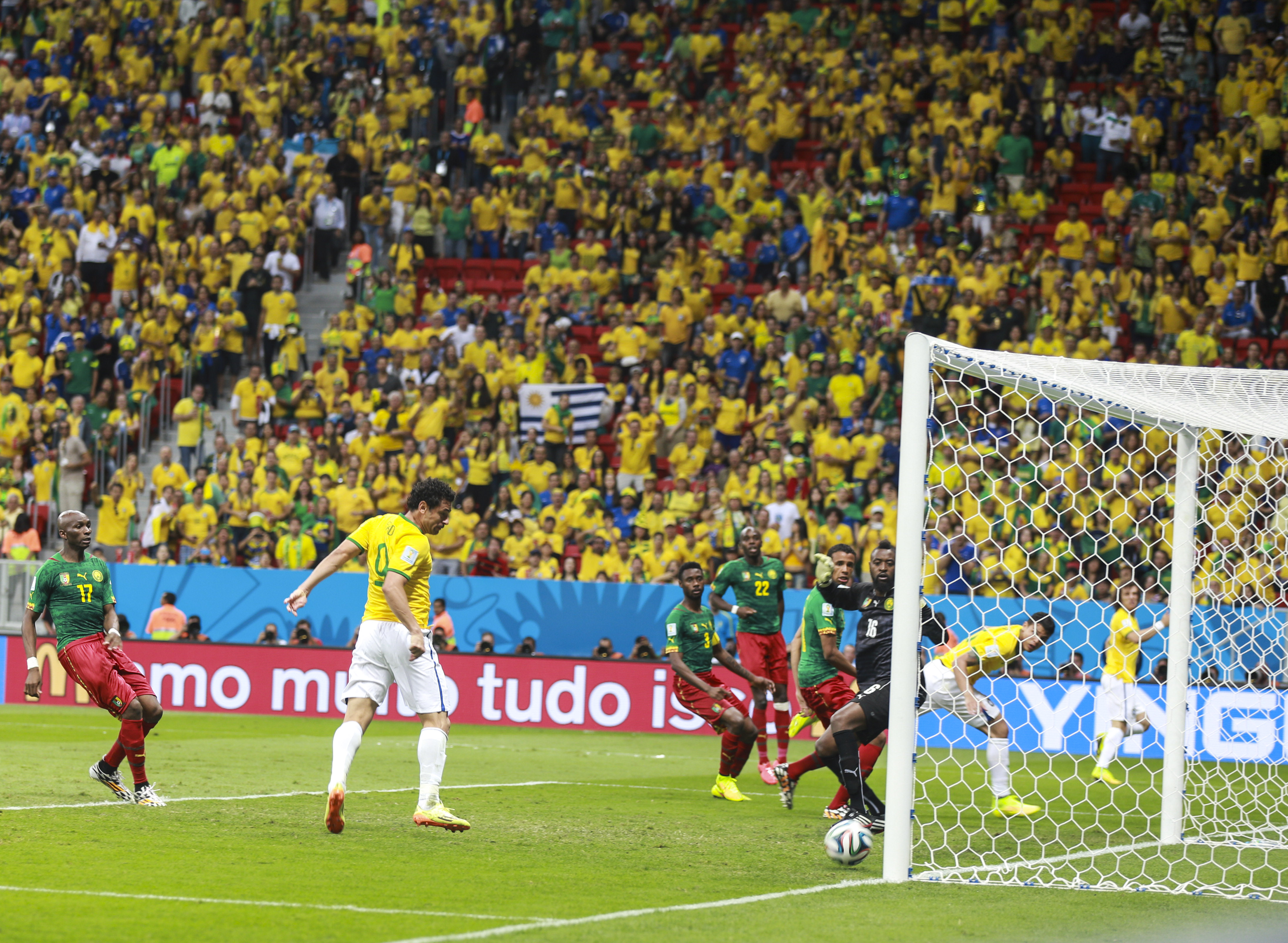
Fred scoring a goal for Brazil as Itandje looks on alongside his compatriots during a group stage match at the 2014 FIFA World Cup

Itandje has represented France on several occasions, making his debut against Yugoslavia in November 2002.

In 2006, he was called up for pre-selection for the French squad after a fine season at RC Lens. He was selected for the équipe de France espoirs (the under-21 team), and became known for his dance to destabilize opponents during the penalty shootout.

In October 2010 he was cleared by FIFA to represent Cameroon after expressing his desire to play for the Cameroon national team.

Itandje made his international debut in the World Cup Qualifier against Togo and soon made himself the number 1 choice. He then went on to play in Cameroon's opening game in the World Cup against Mexico. He then continued in their following two games against Croatia and Brazil. Cameroon lost all of these games, resulting in them being knocked out of the World Cup at the group stage.

== Career statistics ==
As of 1 July 2017

Appearances and goals by club, season and competition
Club	Season	League		Cup^{[A]}		Continental^{[B]}		Others^{[C]}		Total	
Club	Season	Apps	Goals	Apps	Goals	Apps	Goals	Apps	Goals	Apps	Goals
Red Star	2000–01	9	0	0	0	–	–	–	–	9	0
Lens	2001–02	0	0	0	0	–	–	–	–	0	0
Lens	2002–03	22	0	0	0	–	–	–	–	22	0
Lens	2003–04	36	0	0	0	3	0	–	–	39	0
Lens	2004–05	38	0	0	0	–	–	–	–	38	0
Lens	2005–06	37	0	0	0	5	0	–	–	42	0
Lens	2006–07	38	0	0	0	8	0	–	–	46	0
Lens	Total	171	0	0	0	16	0	–	–	187	0
Liverpool	2007–08	0	0	4	0	–	–	3	0	7	0
Liverpool	2008–09	0	0	0	0	–	–	–	–	0	0
Liverpool	2010–11	0	0	0	0	–	–	–	–	0	0
Liverpool	Total	0	0	4	0	–	–	3	0	7	0
Kavala (loan)	2009–10	19	0	2	0	–	–	–	–	21	0
Atromitos	2010–11	7	0	3	0	–	–	–	–	10	0
Atromitos	2011–12	25	0	5	0	–	–	6	0	36	0
Atromitos	2012–13	19	0	0	0	2	0	–	–	21	0
Atromitos	Total	51	0	8	0	2	0	6	0	67	0
PAOK	2012–13	10	0	4	0	–	–	–	–	14	0
PAOK	2014–15	25	0	1	0	–	–	–	–	26	0
PAOK	Total	35	0	5	0	0	0	0	0	40	0
Konyaspor (loan)	2013–14	33	0	0	0	–	–	–	–	33	0
Çaykur Rizespor	2015–16	33	0	4	0	–	–	–	–	37	0
Gaziantepspor	2016–17	5	0	0	0	–	–	–	–	33	0
Adanaspor	2016–17	12	0	0	0	–	–	–	–	33	0
Career total		368	0	23	0	18	0	9	0	418	0

A. Includes appearances in the Greek Cup and FA Cup.
B. Includes appearances in the UEFA Europa League.
C. Includes appearances in the League Cup and Super League Greece play-offs.

== Honours ==
=== Lens ===
- UEFA Intertoto Cup: 2005
