= Marcus Mokaké =

Cameroonian footballer (born 1981)

Personal information
- Full name: Marcus Nwambo Mokaké
- Date of birth: 30 November 1981 (age 44)
- Place of birth: Limbé, Cameroon
- Height: 1.68 m (5 ft 6 in)
- Position: Attacking midfielder

Team information
- Current team: RUS Ethe Belmont

Youth career
- 2001–2002: Mount Cameroon FC
- 2002–2003: Fovu Baham
- 2003: Canon Yaoundé

Senior career*
Years	Team	Apps	(Gls)
2003–2011	Sedan	218	(40)
2011–2012	Pierikos	17	(9)
2012–2013	Kavala	20	(9)
2013	Veria	12	(5)
2013–2014	Lamia	19	(10)
2014–2015	Persebaya DU/Bhayangkara F.C.	10	(3)
2016–2018	Prix-lès-Mézières	?	(?)
2019–	RUS Ethe Belmont	?	(?)

International career
2003–2009	Cameroon	3	(1)
- * Club domestic league appearances and goals as of 15:48, 15 July 2010 (UTC)

Marcus Nwambo Mokaké (born 30 November 1981) is a Cameroonian footballer who plays for RUS Ethe Belmont in Belgium.

== Career ==
=== RUS Ethe Belmont ===
Mokaké joined RUS Ethe Belmont in Belgium on 1 January 2019.

== Personal life ==
Mokaké acquired French nationality by naturalization in May 2009.
