= 2027 U-23 Africa Cup of Nations qualification =

Tournament details
- Dates: 28 September 2026 – 30 March 2027
- Teams: 42 (from 1 confederation)

Tournament statistics
- Matches played: 46
- Goals scored: 113 (2.46 per match)
- Top scorer(s): (Botswana) Losika Ratshukudu (Libya) Jebril Ejfala (South Africa) Quwan Plaatjies (Zimbabwe) Elisha Pfupa (3 goals each)

The qualification matches for the 2027 U-23 Africa Cup of Nations will be held from 28 September 2026 until 30 March 2027. Forty-two teams will compete in three rounds of home-and-away matches to determine the seven nations joining Egypt for the final tournament.

== Teams ==
Of the 53 members of CAF who were eligible to enter qualifying – Egypt qualified automatically as hosts – 42 entered the draw. The 14 entrants with the best overall performances at the 2015, 2019, and 2023 tournaments received a bye to the second round.

Bye to second round 14 teams	First round entrants 28 teams	
Algeria; Cameroon; Congo; Gabon; Ghana; Guinea; Ivory Coast; Mali; Morocco; Niger; Nigeria; Senegal; South Africa; Zambia	Angola; Benin; Botswana; Burkina Faso; Comoros; DR Congo; Djibouti; Equatorial Guinea; Eswatini; Ethiopia; Kenya; Libya; Madagascar; Malawi	Mauritania; Mauritius; Namibia; Rwanda; São Tomé and Príncipe; Seychelles; Sierra Leone; South Sudan; Sudan; Tanzania; Togo; Tunisia; Uganda; Zimbabwe

== Format ==
Teams will play three rounds of two-legged ties:

- First round: Twenty-eight teams played in September and October 2026.
- Second round: The 14 first round winners will join the 14 teams who received a bye to play in November 2026.
- Third round: The 14 second round winners will play in March 2027.

=== Match schedule ===
Round	Dates
First round	28 September – 6 October 2026
Second round	9–17 November 2026
Third round	22–30 March 2027

=== Draw ===
The draw to set the matchups for all three rounds was held 25 August in Cairo.

== First round ==
First round matches were held between 28 September and 6 October 2026.

=== Results ===
Team 1	Agg.	Team 2	1st leg	2nd leg
Sierra Leone	w/o (Note: Sierra Leone withdrew from the qualifiers)	Burkina Faso	—	—
Mauritania	1–2	DR Congo	1–0	0–2
São Tomé and Príncipe	w/o (Note: São Tomé and Príncipe withdrew from the qualifiers.)	Equatorial Guinea	—	—
Togo	2–4	Libya	1–1	1–3
Tunisia	2–1	Benin	2–0	0–1
Kenya	5–4	Tanzania	4–1	1–3
Djibouti	2–4	South Sudan	0–3	2–1
Ethiopia	w/o (Note: Uganda withdrew from the qualifiers due to a lack of funding, with preparations for the 2027 Africa Cup of Nations given priority.)	Uganda	—	—
Rwanda	4–1	Sudan	3–0	1–1
Comoros	w/o (Note: Comoros withdrew from the qualifiers.)	Madagascar	—	—
Angola	6–1	Namibia	1–1	5–0
Seychelles	2–4	Botswana	1–2	1–2
Malawi	1–2	Eswatini	0–1	1–1
Zimbabwe	6–1	Mauritius	2–0	4–1

=== Matches ===
28 September 2026
17:00 UTC+0

Mauritania	1–0	DR Congo
Diarra 11'	Report

Cheikha Ould Boïdiya Stadium, Nouakchott
Referee: Bénoît Bado (Burkina Faso)
6 October 2026
14:00 UTC+1

DR Congo	2–0	Mauritania
Mabete 16'; Mapendo 79'	Report

TP Mazembe Stadium, Lubumbashi

DR Congo won 2–1 on aggregate.

30 September 2026
16:00 UTC+0

Togo	1–1	Libya
Fadouloudin 77'	Report	Ejfala 46'

Kégué Stadium, Lomé
6 October 2026
--:-- UTC+2

Libya	3–1	Togo
Ejfala 27'; Hamam 83'; Zgouzi 88'	Report	Bastou 86'

Misurata Stadium, Misrata

Libya won 4–2 on aggregate.

29 September 2026
19:00 UTC+1

Tunisia	2–0	Benin
Ben Ali 57' (pen.), 90+7'	Report

Sousse Olympic Stadium, Sousse
5 October 2026
16:00 UTC+1

Benin	1–0	Tunisia
Alavo 75'	Report

Kégué Stadium, Lomé (Togo)

Tunisia won 2–1 on aggregate.

28 September 2026
15:00 UTC+3

Kenya	4–1	Tanzania
Osama 2'; Okoth 45+4'; Wangaya 51'; Madada 75'	Report	Khamis 54' (pen.)

Nyayo National Stadium, Nairobi
Referee: Luxolo Badi (South Africa)
6 October 2026
16:00 UTC+3

Tanzania	3–1	Kenya
Khamis 16'; Mwalimu 28', 88' (pen.)	Report	Odhiambo 48'

Uhuru Stadium, Dar es Salaam

Kenya won 5–4 on aggregate.

30 September 2026
15:00 UTC+2

Djibouti	0–3	South Sudan
	Report	Taban 50'; Goah 83'; Gem 90+4'

Juba Stadium, Juba (South Sudan)
4 October 2026
15:30 UTC+2

South Sudan	1–2	Djibouti
Gem 11'	Report	Onyango 39' (pen.), 68'

Juba Stadium, Juba

South Sudan won 4–2 on aggregate.

30 September 2026
18:00 UTC+2

Rwanda	3–0	Sudan
Niyigena 10'; Shingiro 47'; Sindi 78'	Report

Kigali Pelé Stadium, Kigali
6 October 2026
--:-- UTC+2

Sudan	1–1	Rwanda
Al Othaymin 3'	Report	Antar 55' (o.g.)

Juba Stadium, Juba (South Sudan)

Rwanda won 4–1 on aggregate.

30 September 2026
--:-- UTC+1

Angola	1–1	Namibia
Muanha 80' (o.g.)	Report	Kasaona 73'

11 November Stadium, Talatona
5 October 2026
--:-- UTC+2

Namibia	0–5	Angola
	Report	20'; 25'; 40'; 58'; 75'

Botswana National Stadium

Angola won 6–1 on aggregate.

2 October 2026
--:-- UTC+2

Seychelles	1–2	Botswana
Louis 17'	Report	Ratshukudu 9', 52'

Botswana National Stadium, Gaborone (Botswana)
6 October 2026
--:-- UTC+2

Botswana	2–1	Seychelles
Ratshukudu 23'; Keipidile 55'	Report	Hoareau 42'

Botswana National Stadium, Gaborone

Botswana won 4–2 on aggregate.

29 September 2026
15:00 UTC+2

Malawi	0–1	Eswatini
	Report	Gama 79'

Bingu National Stadium, Lilongwe
6 October 2026
15:00 UTC+2

Eswatini	1–1	Malawi
Mazibuko 76'	Report	Nchema 90'

Somhlolo National Stadium, Lobamba

Eswatini won 2–1 on aggregate.

30 September 2026
18:00 UTC+2

Zimbabwe	2–0	Mauritius
Chigwada 43'; Muzenda 71'	Report

National Sports Stadium, Harare
6 October 2026
--:-- UTC+4

Mauritius	1–4	Zimbabwe
Jolicoeur 26'	Report	Pfupa 14', 19', 40'; Chigwada 45'

Côte d'Or National Sports Complex, Saint Pierre

Zimbabwe won 6–1 on aggregate.

== Second round ==
Second round matches will be held between 9 and 17 November 2026.

=== Results ===
Team 1	Agg.	Team 2	1st leg	2nd leg
Burkina Faso	1–1 (2–3 p)	Zambia	1–0	0–1
DR Congo	2–4	Nigeria	2–0	0–4
Equatorial Guinea	w/o (Note: Equatorial Guinea withdrew from the qualifiers.)	Niger	—	—
Libya	2–3	Ghana	1–0	1–3
Tunisia	2–2 (a)	Gabon	2–1	0–1
Kenya	2–3	Ivory Coast	2–1	0–2
South Sudan	1–3	Senegal	0–0	1–3
Ethiopia	3–6	Morocco	0–1	3–5
Rwanda	0–3	Cameroon	0–3	0–0
Madagascar	2–4	South Africa	0–1	2–3
Angola	1–2	Congo	1–1	0–1
Botswana	0–8	Guinea	0–1	0–7
Eswatini	3–4	Algeria	2–1	1–3
Zimbabwe	0–8	Mali	0–3	0–5

=== Matches ===
11 November 2026
18:00 UTC+0

Burkina Faso	1–0	Zambia
Koné 22'	Report

Stade du 4 Août, Ouagadougou
15 November 2026
15:00 UTC+2

Zambia	1–0	Burkina Faso
Musonda 83'	Report
Penalties
	3–2

1–1 on aggregate, Zambia won 3–2 on penalties.

13 November 2026
15:00 UTC+2

DR Congo	2–0	Nigeria
James 15' (o.g.); Mabete 35'	Report

Stade du TP Mazembe, Lubumbashi
17 November 2026
16:00 UTC+1

Nigeria	4–0	DR Congo
Oweilayefa 8'; Edokpolor 47'; Samuel 58'; Adeleke 90+3' (pen.)	Report

Nigeria won 4–2 on aggregate.

11 November 2026
19:00 UTC+2

Libya	1–0	Ghana
Ejfala 90'	Report

17 November 2026
15:00 UTC+0

Ghana	3–1	Libya
Afrifa 16'; Essel 63'; Marfo 90+6' (pen.)	Report	Zgouzi 45+2'

Accra Sports Stadium, Accra

Ghana won 3–2 on aggregate.

12 November 2026
18:00 UTC+1

Tunisia	2–1	Gabon
Gröller 31'; Elloumi 77'	Report	Ngatsie 90+3'

17 November 2026
15:30 UTC+1

Gabon	1–0	Tunisia
Olouonodia 85'	Report

Gabon won 2–2 on aggregate via the away goals rule.

11 November 2026
15:00 UTC+3

Kenya	2–1	Ivory Coast
Omollo 65'; Odhiambo 84'	Report	Konaté 74'

Nyayo National Stadium, Nairobi
17 November 2026
19:00 UTC+0

Ivory Coast	2–0	Kenya
Souleymane 16', 75'	Report

Ivory Coast won 3–2 on aggregate.

11 November 2026
15:00 UTC+2

South Sudan	0–0	Senegal
	Report

Juba Stadium, Juba
17 November 2026
19:00 UTC+0

Senegal	3–1	South Sudan
Dieme 47'; Cissé 51'; Dieng 59'	Report	Junior 90+2'

Senegal won 3–1 on aggregate.

12 November 2026
16:00 UTC+3

Ethiopia	0–1	Morocco
	Report	El Bahraoui 28'

17 November 2026
15:30 UTC+0

Morocco	5–3	Ethiopia
Bouhamdi 17'; Barry 43'; El Bahraoui 60'; Maamma 65'; Maali 68'	Report	Bruk 37'; Solomon 81', 90+1'

Morocco won 6–3 on aggregate.

11 November 2026
18:00 UTC+2

Rwanda	0–3	Cameroon
	Report	Edzimbi 64', 90+3'; Rattensi 87'

17 November 2026
20:00 UTC+1

Cameroon	0–0	Rwanda
	Report

Cameroon won 3–0 on aggregate.

14 November 2026
16:00 UTC+3

Madagascar	0–1	South Africa
	Report	Plaatjies 72'

17 November 2026
20:00 UTC+2

South Africa	3–2	Madagascar
Plaatjies 8', 27'; Padime 68'	Report	Brayans 56'; Rambelsoson 89'

South Africa won 4–2 on aggregate.

12 November 2026
16:00 UTC+1

Angola	1–1	Congo
Giloso 84'	Report	Bassinga 48'

15 November 2026
17:00 UTC+1

Congo	1–0	Angola
Bassinga 45'	Report

Congo won 2–1 on aggregate.

11 November 2026
19:00 UTC+2

Botswana	0–1	Guinea
	Report	Touré 43'

17 November 2026
16:00 UTC+0

Guinea	7–0	Botswana
Abdoul. Camara 23', 45+4'; Abdou Camara 51', 90'; Bah 53', 86'; M. Bangoura 57'	Report

Guinea won 8–0 on aggregate.

11 November 2026
16:00 UTC+2

Eswatini	2–1	Algeria
Vilakati 60'; Kumalo 63'	Report	Bakhouche 45'

Somhlolo National Stadium, Lobamba
16 November 2026
18:00 UTC+1

Algeria	3–1	Eswatini
Akhrib 8', 31'; Bechikh 34'	Report	Vilakati 27'

Stade Omar Hamadi, Algiers

Algeria won 4–3 on aggregate.

11 November 2026
15:00 UTC+2

Zimbabwe	0–3	Mali
	Report	Sidibé 8'; Sissoko 28' (pen.); Dembélé 55'

National Sports Stadium, Harare
17 November 2026
18:00 UTC+0

Mali	5–0	Zimbabwe
Sidibé 7'; Haïdara 14'; Makalou 27'; Fofana 76', 90+1'	Report

Stade 26 Mars, Bamako

Mali won 8–0 on aggregate.

== Third round ==
Third round matches will be held between 22 and 30 March 2027.

=== Results ===
Team 1	Agg.	Team 2	1st leg	2nd leg
Zambia	M 57/58	Nigeria	Mar	Mar
Niger	M 59/60	Ghana	Mar	Mar
Gabon	M 61/62	Ivory Coast	Mar	Mar
Morocco	M 63/64	Senegal	Mar	Mar
Cameroon	M 65/66	South Africa	Mar	Mar
Congo	M 67/68	Guinea	Mar	Mar
Algeria	M 69/70	Mali	Mar	Mar

=== Matches ===
March 2027
--:--

Zambia	v	Nigeria

March 2027
--:--

Nigeria	v	Zambia

March 2027
--:--

Niger	v	Ghana

March 2027
--:--

Ghana	v	Niger

March 2027
--:--

Gabon	v	Ivory Coast

March 2027
--:--

Ivory Coast	v	Gabon

March 2027
--:--

Morocco	v	Senegal

March 2027
--:--

Senegal	v	Morocco

March 2027
--:--

Cameroon	v	South Africa

March 2027
--:--

South Africa	v	Cameroon

March 2027
--:--

Congo	v	Guinea

March 2027
--:--

Guinea	v	Congo

March 2027
--:--

Algeria	v	Mali

March 2027
--:--

Mali	v	Algeria

== Qualified teams ==
The following teams qualified for the 2027 U-23 Africa Cup of Nations, including Egypt who qualified automatically as hosts:

Team	Date qualified	Previous appearances (Note: Bold indicates champions for that year. Italics indicates hosts for that year.)
Egypt	10 August 2026	2011, 2015, 2019, 2023
	March 2027	
	March 2027	
	March 2027	
	March 2027	
	March 2027	
	March 2027	
	March 2027	

== Goalscorers ==
There were 113 goals scored in 46 matches, for an average of 2.46 goals per match.

3 goals

- (Botswana) Losika Ratshukudu
- (Libya) Jebril Ejfala
- (South Africa) Quwan Plaatjies
- (Zimbabwe) Elisha Pfupa

2 goals

- (Algeria) Lahlou Akhrib
- (Cameroon) Patrick Edzimbi
- (Republic of the Congo) Déo Bassinga
- (Democratic Republic of the Congo) Filozofe Mabete
- (Djibouti) Elly Onyango
- (Eswatini) Sibonelo Vilakati
- (Ethiopia) Natnael Solomon
- (Guinea) Aboubacar Bah
- (Guinea) Abdou Karim Camara
- (Guinea) Abdoulaye Camara
- (Ivory Coast) Fofana Souleymane
- (Kenya) Andreas Odhiambo
- (Libya) Marwan Zgouzi
- (Mali) Douga Fofana
- (Mali) Aboubakar Sidibé
- (Morocco) Younes El Bahraoui
- (South Sudan) Jonathan Gem
- (Tanzania) Sheikhan Khamis
- (Tanzania) Selemani Mwalimu
- (Tunisia) Omar Ben Ali
- (Zimbabwe) David Chigwada

1 goal

- (Algeria) Gaëtan Bakhouche
- (Algeria) Mohamed Bechikh
- (Angola) Filomeno Giloso
- (Benin) Kévin Alavo
- (Botswana) Tlotlo Keipidile
- (Burkina Faso) Nouhoun Koné
- (Cameroon) Nko Ghangle Rattensi
- (Democratic Republic of the Congo) Candidat Mapendo
- (Eswatini) Njabulo Gama
- (Eswatini) Bongumenzi Kumalo
- (Eswatini) Njongo Mazibuko
- (Ethiopia) Yarad Bruk
- (Gabon) Gidney Sany Ngatsie
- (Gabon) Brad Olouonodia
- (Ghana) Lord Afrifa
- (Ghana) Aaron Essel
- (Ghana) Denis Marfo
- (Guinea) Mohamed Bangoura
- (Guinea) Mohamed Touré
- (Ivory Coast) Oumar Konaté
- (Kenya) Kelly Madada
- (Kenya) Henry Omollo
- (Kenya) Paul Osama
- (Kenya) Lawrence Ouma
- (Kenya) Kevin Wangaya
- (Libya) Hamza Hamam
- (Madagascar) Raveloarison Brayans
- (Madagascar) William Rambelsoson
- (Malawi) John Nchema
- (Mali) Seydou Dembélé
- (Mali) Moulaye Haïdara
- (Mali) Hamidou Makalou
- (Mali) Niama Pape Sissoko
- (Mauritania) Hamidou Diarra
- (Mauritius) Christ Jolicoeur
- (Morocco) Kaïs Barry
- (Morocco) Amir Bouhamdi
- (Morocco) Abdelhamid Maali
- (Morocco) Othmane Maamma
- (Namibia) Ngahepa Kasaona
- (Nigeria) Abdulmuiz Adeleke
- (Nigeria) Peter Edokpolor
- (Nigeria) Alex Oweilayefa
- (Nigeria) Victor Samuel
- (Rwanda) Abdul Niyigena
- (Rwanda) Honore Shingiro
- (Rwanda) Jesus Paul Sindi
- (Senegal) Ibrahima Cissé
- (Senegal) Yaya Dieme
- (Senegal) El Hadji Dieng
- (Seychelles) Lorenzo Hoareau
- (Seychelles) Christiano Louis
- (South Africa) Mpho Padime
- (South Sudan) Silva Goah
- (South Sudan) Bin Omar Junior
- (South Sudan) Mario Taban
- (Sudan) Shams al-Din Al Othaymin
- (Togo) Djibril Bastou
- (Togo) Koumeyi Fadouloudin
- (Tunisia) Rayan Elloumi
- (Tunisia) Amin-Elias Gröller
- (Zambia) Caleb Musonda
- (Zimbabwe) Nisbert Muzenda

1 own goal

- (Namibia) Jairo Muanha (against Angola)
- (Nigeria) Samuel Friday James (against DR Congo)
- (Sudan) Awab Antar (against Rwanda)
