= Emilio Ferrera =

Belgian footballer (born 1967)

Personal information
- Date of birth: 19 June 1967 (age 59)
- Place of birth: Schaerbeek, Belgium
- Position: Midfielder

Team information
- Current team: Patro Eisden (manager)

Senior career*
Years	Team	Apps	(Gls)
1975–1982	Crossing		
1982–1983	Anderlecht		
1983–1986	Eendracht Aalst		
1986–1987	Wolvertem		
1987–1990	Stade Leuven		
1990–1991	Seraing		
1991–1992	Ganshoren		

Managerial career
- 1991–1992: Ganshoren (player-coach)
- 1993–1994: Bruxelles
- 1994–1995: Club América (assistant)
- 1995: Club América (caretaker)
- 1995–1996: Bruxelles
- 1996–1997: Racing Jet Wavre
- 1997–1999: Lombeek
- 1999–2001: Beveren
- 2001–2002: Molenbeek
- 2002–2004: Lierse
- 2004–2005: FC Brussels
- 2005: La Louvière
- 2006–2007: Club Brugge
- 2007–2008: Skoda Xanthi
- 2008–2009: Panthrakikos
- 2009–2010: Panionios
- 2010: Lokeren
- 2010–2011: Panthrakikos
- 2011–2013: Al-Shabab (assistant)
- 2013–2014: Al-Shabab
- 2014: Genk
- 2015: Dender EH
- 2015–2017: OH Leuven
- 2017: Anderlecht Youth
- 2017–2018: Anderlecht U21
- 2018–2019: Standard Liège (assistant)
- 2019: F91 Dudelange
- 2020–2021: Seraing
- 2021–2024: Gent U21
- 2025: Mons
- 2025–2026: Crossing Schaerbeek
- 2026–: Patro Eisden
- * Club domestic league appearances and goals

Emilio Ferrera (born 19 June 1967) is a Belgian football manager and former player who manages Challenger Pro League club Patro Eisden.

Former clubs include OH Leuven in the Belgian First Division B, and Genk, where he was fired after coaching only one match, following a 1–3 season-opening defeat to KV Mechelen. Ferrera has managed a number of clubs across various countries and continents (mostly in Belgium, but also including Greece, Luxembourg, Saudi Arabia and a short stint in Mexico), having started his coaching career in his twenties. For example, he led Club América ad interim in the 1995 Mexican football season, aged only 27 at the time.

== Personal life ==
Emilio Ferrera was born in Schaerbeek, Belgium. His family emigrated from the Spanish village El Cerro de Andévalo in 1962. His brothers, Manu and Francisco, and his nephew Yannick, are all football coaches.
