= Yannick Ferrera =

Belgian footballer and manager

Personal information
- Full name: Yannick Ferrera y Caro
- Date of birth: 24 September 1980 (age 46)
- Place of birth: Ukkel, Belgium

Youth career
- 1988–1996: Anderlecht
- 1996–1998: Mechelen
- 1998–1999: Denderleeuw
- 1999–2000: Mechelen

Senior career*
Years	Team	Apps	(Gls)
2000–2001	Beveren		
2001–2002	Tubize		
2002	Ternat		
2003	Jette		

Managerial career
- 2004–2010: Anderlecht (youth)
- 2010–2011: Gent (assistant)
- 2011–2012: Al-Shabab (assistant)
- 2012–2013: Charleroi
- 2013–2015: Sint-Truiden
- 2015–2016: Standard Liège
- 2016–2017: KV Mechelen
- 2018: Waasland-Beveren
- 2019–2022: Al-Fateh
- 2022–2023: Omonia
- 2023: Al-Riyadh
- 2024–2025: RWD Molenbeek
- 2025: Zamalek
- 2026: Dender EH
- * Club domestic league appearances and goals

Yannick Ferrera y Caro (born 24 September 1980) is a Belgian-Spanish professional football manager and former player.

== Club career ==
In his early twenties, Ferrera enjoyed a brief career as a professional footballer, playing for Belgian sides Beveren, Tubize, Ternat and Jette.

== Managerial career ==
In 2004, Ferrera was appointed head coach of the Anderlecht youth team, which at that time included Romelu Lukaku and Adnan Januzaj. In 2010, he joined the technical staff of AA Gent, serving under manager Michel Preud'homme, whom Ferrera later followed to Saudi Arabian club Al-Shabab.

In 2012, Ferrera became manager of the first league team Charleroi. One year later, he moved to Sint-Truiden that was playing in the Belgian Second Division. Under his leadership, STVV gained promotion to the highest level for the 2015–16 season.

In September 2015, Ferrera was appointed manager at Standard Liège. In spite of winning the domestic cup that season, he was sacked early into the 2016–17 season due to disputes with the board of directors. Ferrera was replaced by Aleksandar Janković. Janković's former club, Mechelen, immediately decided to hire Ferrera for two seasons as a replacement.

On 14 October 2019, Ferrera was appointed as the new manager of Saudi Professional League outfit Al-Fateh. He left the club by mutual consent on 9 January 2022.

On 21 October 2022, Ferrera was appointed manager of Cypriot First Division club Omonia Nicosia. He was sacked in February 2023, amidst disappointing results in the league.

On 6 June 2023, Ferrera was appointed as manager of newly promoted Saudi Pro League side Al-Riyadh. On 20 September 2023, Ferrera was sacked by Al-Riyadh, with the club sitting in the relegation places.

In March 2024, Ferrera joined RWD Molenbeek to help the club avoid relegation during the play-offs. Despite a brief resurgence, RWDM was ultimately relegated. He was nonetheless extended for two more seasons to lead the team's return to the top division. After missing direct promotion in 2024–25 and entering the play-offs, RWDM and Ferrera parted ways.

On 4 July 2025, Ferrera was appointed as head coach of Egyptian side Zamalek by signing a one-year contract.

In February 2026, Ferrera became manager of Dender until June 2026.

== Personal life ==
Ferrera was born in Ukkel to a Spanish father and an Italian mother. He retained his Spanish citizenship until 1992, when he was naturalised as a Belgian. His father, Francisco, and his uncles, Manu and Emilio Ferrera are all footballing coaches in Belgium.

== Managerial statistics ==
As of match played 18 April 2025

Managerial record by team and tenure
Team	Nat	From	To	Record							
Team	Nat	From	To	G	W	D	L	GF	GA	GD	Win %
Charleroi	(Belgium)	14 July 2012	14 February 2013	27	9	4	14	30	48	−18	33.33
Sint-Truiden	(Belgium)	24 May 2013	7 September 2015	84	51	16	17	137	84	+53	60.71
Standard Liège	(Belgium)	7 September 2015	6 September 2016	42	19	9	14	61	54	+7	45.24
KV Mechelen	(Belgium)	12 September 2016	23 October 2017	48	19	11	18	62	71	−9	39.58
Waasland-Beveren	(Belgium)	8 June 2018	11 November 2018	16	1	8	7	17	24	−7	6.25
Al-Fateh	(Saudi Arabia)	14 October 2019	9 January 2022	77	29	19	29	130	124	+6	37.66
Omonia	(Cyprus)	23 October 2022	6 February 2023	17	9	2	6	25	17	+8	52.94
Al-Riyadh	(Saudi Arabia)	6 June 2023	20 September 2023	6	1	1	4	4	16	−12	16.67
RWD Molenbeek	(Belgium)	23 March 2024	18 April 2025	37	20	8	9	43	28	+15	54.05
Zamalek SC	(Egypt)	4 July 2025	1 November 2025	12	7	3	2	21	7	+14	58.33
Total				354	158	78	118	509	466	+43	44.63

== Honours ==
Sint-Truiden

- Belgian Second Division: 2014–15

Standard Liège

- Belgian Cup: 2015–16

Individual

- Saudi Professional League Manager of the Month: October 2020
