= 2026–27 KAA Gent season =

KAA Gent
2026–27 season
- Manager: Rik De Mil
- Stadium: Planet Group Arena
- Belgian Pro League: 4th
- Belgian Cup: Seventh round
- UEFA Conference League: Play-off round

The 2026–27 season is the 127th season in the history of Koninklijke Atletiek Associatie Gent and their 37th consecutive year in the Belgian top flight. The club will also compete in the Belgian Cup and the UEFA Conference League.

== Transfers ==
=== In ===
Pos.	Player	Transferred from	Fee	Date	Source
DF	(Angola) Núrio Fortuna	(Greece) Volos	Loan return	30 June 2026	
MF	(Slovakia) László Bénes	(Germany) Union Berlin	Undisclosed	1 July 2026	
DF	(England) Christian Burgess	(Belgium) Union Saint-Gilloise	Free	1 July 2026	
FW	(Panama) Josué Vergara	(Latvia) FK Auda	Undisclosed	1 July 2026	
FW	(Democratic Republic of the Congo) Michel-Ange Balikwisha	(Scotland) Celtic	Loan	29 August 2026	

=== Out ===
Pos.	Player	Transferred to	Fee	Date	Source
DF	(Haiti) Jean-Kévin Duverne	(France) Nantes	Loan return	30 June 2026	
DF	(Angola) Núrio Fortuna	(Angola) Atlético Petróleos de Luanda		1 July 2026	
DF	(Cameroon) Samuel Kotto	(France) Reims	Loan made permanent	1 July 2026	
FW	(Japan) Daisuke Yokota	(Germany) Hannover 96	Loan made permanent	1 July 2026	
DF	(Morocco) Hatim Essaouabi	(Greece) Volos	Loan	1 July 2026	

== Pre-season and friendlies ==
27 June 2026 Friendly	Merelbeke (Belgium)	1–6	(Belgium) Gent
19:00	Diallo 56'	Report	Kanga 6' (pen.), 8'; Itō 15'; Dean 80'; Sonko 86'; Kadri 89'

4 July 2026 Friendly	AZ Alkmaar (Netherlands)	3–3	(Belgium) Gent
16:00	41'; 55'; 86'		Kanga 42'; Gambor 79'; Dean 83'

== Competitions ==
=== Overall record ===
Competition	First match	Last match	Starting round	Final position	Record							
Competition	First match	Last match	Starting round	Final position	Pld	W	D	L	GF	GA	GD	Win %
Belgian Pro League			Matchday 1	9 August 2026	7	6	1	0	13	4	+9	85.71
Belgian Cup					0	0	0	0	0	0	+0	—
UEFA Conference League	23 July 2026		Second qualifying round		6	2	4	0	5	3	+2	33.33
Total					13	8	5	0	18	7	+11	61.54

Last updated: 18 September 2026
Source: Competitions

=== Belgian Pro League ===
Pos	Team	Pld	W	D	L	GF	GA	GD	Pts	Qualification or relegation
1	Gent	8	7	1	0	15	4	+11	22	Qualification for the Champions League league phase
2	Club Brugge	8	7	0	1	19	4	+15	21	Qualification for the Champions League third qualifying round
3	Union SG	7	6	1	0	21	3	+18	19	Qualification for the Europa League second qualifying round
4	Charleroi	7	6	0	1	15	7	+8	18	Qualification for the Conference League second qualifying round
5	Anderlecht	8	5	1	2	9	6	+3	16	

Updated to match(es) played on 10 October 2026. Source: Jupiler Pro League (in Dutch)
Rules for classification: 1) Points; 2) Matches won; 3) Goal difference; 4) Goals scored; 5) Away matches won; 6) Away goal difference; 7) Away goals scored; 8) Play-off.

==== Matches ====
9 August 2026 1	Gent	2–0	Mechelen	Ghent
13:30	Araújo 37'; Vergara 45'	Report	Decoene (yellow card) 85'	Stadium: Planet Group Arena; Attendance: 10,930; Referee: Erik Lambrechts

16 August 2026 2	La Louvière	1–2	Gent	La Louvière
16:00	Isah 9'; Lamego (yellow card) 90+2'	Report	Sonko 19'; Cissé 45'	Stadium: Easi Arena; Attendance: 3,976; Referee: Bert Put

30 August 2026 4	Gent	2–1	Club Brugge	Ghent
13:30	Wilson (yellow card) 15'; Vergara 37'; Lopes (yellow card) 50'; Cissé (yellow card) 80', (goal) 84', (red card) 90+4'	Report	Vanaken 39'; Potts (yellow card) 66'; Forbs (red card) 69'; Mechele (yellow card) 74'; Seys (yellow card) 86'	Stadium: Planet Group Arena; Referee: Erik Lambrechts

3 September 2026 3	Gent	1–0	OH Leuven	Ghent
20:30	Araújo 45'; Van der Heyden (yellow card) 64'	Report	George (yellow card) 57'; Gil (yellow card) 75'	Stadium: Planet Group Arena; Referee: Michiel Allaerts

6 September 2026 5	Cercle Brugge	0–3	Gent	Bruges
13:30	Amani (yellow card) 69'	Report	Kakou 20' (o.g.); De Vlieger 76' (pen.); Seck 90+1'	Stadium: Jan Breydel Stadium; Referee: Yusuke Araki

13 September 2026 6	Genk	1–1	Gent	Genk
16:00	Durosinmi 46'; Tahirović (yellow card) 52'; Kongolo (yellow card) 79'	Report	Sonko 9', (yellow card) 21'; Vergara (yellow card) 31'; Araújo (yellow card) 48'; Delorge (yellow card) 65'; Lopes (yellow card) 77'	Stadium: Cegeka Arena; Attendance: 16,924; Referee: Nathan Verboomen

18 September 2026 7	Gent	2–1	Standard Liège	Ghent
20:45	Vergara 30'; Van der Heyden (yellow card) 57'; Burgess 82'	Report	Nielsen 47'	Stadium: Planet Group Arena; Referee: Lothar D'Hondt

10 October 2026 8	Zulte Waregem	0–2	Gent	Waregem
20:45	Mbaye (red card) 74'		Cissé 12'; Omgba (yellow card) 89'; Balikwisha 90+2'	Stadium: Elindus Arena; Referee: Nicolas Laforge

=== UEFA Conference League ===
==== Second qualifying round ====
23 July 2026 First leg	LNZ Cherkasy (Ukraine)	0–0	(Belgium) Gent	Płock, Poland
20:30		Report		Stadium: Kazimierz Górski Stadium; Attendance: 920; Referee: Granit Maqedonci (Sweden)

30 July 2026 Second leg	Gent (Belgium)	0–0 (a.e.t.) (4–2 p)	(Ukraine) LNZ Cherkasy	Ghent, Belgium
20:30		Report		Stadium: Planet Group Arena; Attendance: 9,674; Referee: Genc Nuza (Kosovo)
	Penalties
	Kadri (penalty scored); De Vlieger (penalty scored); Leonardo Lopes (penalty scored); Sonko (penalty scored)		(penalty scored) Talles; (penalty missed) Tverdokhlib; (penalty scored) Kravchuk; (penalty missed) Kuzyk

==== Third qualifying round ====
6 August 2026 First leg	IFK Göteborg (Sweden)	0–1	(Belgium) Gent	Gothenburg, Sweden
19:00		Report	Goore 45'	Stadium: Gamla Ullevi; Attendance: 15,468; Referee: Antoni Bandić (Bosnia and Herzegovina)

13 August 2026 Second leg	Gent (Belgium)	1–1	(Sweden) IFK Göteborg	Ghent, Belgium
20:30	Volckaert 27'	Report	Alioum 85'	Stadium: Planet Group Arena; Attendance: 10,531; Referee: Gustavo Correia (Portugal)

==== Play-off round ====
20 August 2026 First leg	Gent (Belgium)	0–0	(Scotland) Hibernian	Ghent, Belgium
20:30		Report		Stadium: Planet Group Arena; Attendance: 10,557; Referee: Paweł Raczkowski (Poland)

27 August 2026 Second leg	Hibernian (Scotland)	2–3	(Belgium) Gent	Edinburgh, Scotland
21:00	Kerr 56'; Passlack 77'	Report	Vergara 39'; Burgess 84'; Chaiwa 90+1' (o.g.)	Stadium: Easter Road; Attendance: 18,997; Referee: Juan Martínez Munuera (Spain)

==== League phase ====
The draw for the league phase was held on 28 August 2026.

Pos	Team	Pld	W	D	L	GF	GA	GD	Pts	Qualification
1	(Bulgaria) CSKA Sofia	0	0	0	0	0	0	0	0	Advance to knockout phase play-offs (seeded)
1	(Albania) Egnatia	0	0	0	0	0	0	0	0	Advance to knockout phase play-offs (seeded)
1	(Belgium) Gent	0	0	0	0	0	0	0	0	Advance to knockout phase play-offs (seeded)
1	(Spain) Getafe	0	0	0	0	0	0	0	0	Advance to knockout phase play-offs (seeded)
1	(Croatia) Hajduk Split	0	0	0	0	0	0	0	0	Advance to knockout phase play-offs (seeded)

First match(es) will be played: 15 October 2026. Source: UEFA
Rules for classification: League phase tiebreakers

Round	1	2	3	4	5	6
Ground	H	A	A	H	A	H
Result						
Position						
Points						

Source: UEFA
A = Away; H = Home; W = Win; D = Draw; L = Loss

15 October 2026 1	Gent (Belgium)	v	(Denmark) AGF	Ghent, Belgium
18:45				Stadium: Planet Group Arena

22 October 2026 2	Braga (Portugal)	v	(Belgium) Gent	Braga, Portugal
21:00 (20:00 UTC+1)				Stadium: Estádio Municipal

5 November 2026 3	KuPS (Finland)	v	(Belgium) Gent	Tampere, Finland
18:45 (19:45 UTC+2)				Stadium: Tammelan Stadion

26 November 2026 4	Gent (Belgium)	v	(Serbia) Red Star Belgrade	Ghent, Belgium
21:00				Stadium: Planet Group Arena

10 December 2026 5	Thun (Switzerland)	v	(Belgium) Gent	Thun, Switzerland
20:00				Stadium: Stockhorn Arena

17 December 2026 6	Gent (Belgium)	v	(Norway) Brann	Ghent, Belgium
21:00				Stadium: Planet Group Arena
