= Schepens =

Schepens is a Belgian or Dutch family name

- Charles Schepens (1912-2006), Belgian ophthalmologist
- Eugeen Schepens (1853-1923), Belgian colonial pioneer in Villaguay (Argentina)
- Gunther Schepens (*1973), Belgian football player
- Julien Schepens (1935-2006), Belgian road bicycle racer
- Niels Schepens (1994), Belgian bowling athlete

== See also ==
- Schepen
