= Football at the 2028 Summer Olympics – Men's qualification =

Twelve teams are scheduled to compete in the men's football tournament at the 2028 Summer Olympics. Eleven men's teams from six confederations will qualify to join the United States, who qualified as the host nation.

== Table ==
In April 2025, the IOC Executive Board approved FIFA's suggestion that the men's tournament have 12 teams. In December 2025, the FIFA Council approved the final allocation of berths.

| Means of qualification | Dates (Note: Dates and venues are those of final tournaments (or final round of qualification tournaments); various qualification stages may precede these matches.) | Venue(s) | Berth(s) | Qualified |
|---|---|---|---|---|
| Host nation | —N/a | —N/a | 1 | United States |
| 2028 AFC U-23 Asian Cup | 4–22 January 2028 | Japan | 2 | |
| 2027 U-23 Africa Cup of Nations | 19 November – 4 December 2027 | Egypt | 2 | |
| 2026 CONCACAF U-20 Championship | 25 July – 9 August 2026 | Mexico | 1 | Mexico |
| CONMEBOL Olympic qualifying tournament | TBD | TBD | 2 | |
| OFC Olympic qualifying tournament | TBD | TBD | 1 | |
| 2027 UEFA European Under-21 Championship | 17 June – 4 July 2027 | Albania; Serbia | 3 | |
| Total | | | 12 | |

== Confederation qualification ==
As of September 2026, CONMEBOL and OFC had not announced their qualification processes.

=== AFC ===
AFC will use the results of the 2028 U-23 Asian Cup to determine the qualifying nations.

=== CAF ===
CAF will use the results of the 2027 U-23 Africa Cup of Nations to determine the qualifying nations.

==== Most recent stage (qualification second round) ====
Second round
| Team 1 | Agg. | Team 2 | 1st leg | 2nd leg |
|---|---|---|---|---|
| Burkina Faso | 1–1 (2–3 p) | Zambia | 1–0 | 0–1 (a.e.t.) |
| DR Congo | 2–4 | Nigeria | 2–0 | 0–4 |
| Equatorial Guinea | w/o (Note: Equatorial Guinea withdrew from the qualifiers.) | Niger | — | — |
| Libya | 2–3 | Ghana | 1–0 | 1–3 |
| Tunisia | 2–2 (a) | Gabon | 2–1 | 0–1 |
| Kenya | 2–3 | Ivory Coast | 2–1 | 0–2 |
| South Sudan | 1–3 | Senegal | 0–0 | 1–3 |
| Ethiopia | 3–6 | Morocco | 0–1 | 3–5 |
| Rwanda | 0–3 | Cameroon | 0–3 | 0–0 |
| Madagascar | 2–4 | South Africa | 0–1 | 2–3 |
| Angola | 1–2 | Congo | 1–1 | 0–1 |
| Botswana | 0–8 | Guinea | 0–1 | 0–7 |
| Eswatini | 3–4 | Algeria | 2–1 | 1–3 |
| Zimbabwe | 0–8 | Mali | 0–3 | 0–5 |

==== Next stage (qualification third round) ====
Third round
| Team 1 | Agg. | Team 2 | 1st leg | 2nd leg |
|---|---|---|---|---|
| Zambia | M 57/58 | Nigeria | Mar | Mar |
| Niger | M 59/60 | Ghana | Mar | Mar |
| Gabon | M 61/62 | Ivory Coast | Mar | Mar |
| Morocco | M 63/64 | Senegal | Mar | Mar |
| Cameroon | M 65/66 | South Africa | Mar | Mar |
| Congo | M 67/68 | Guinea | Mar | Mar |
| Algeria | M 69/70 | Mali | Mar | Mar |

=== CONCACAF ===
==== Final results (knockout stage) ====
Quarter-finals
4 August – Puebla (Cuauhtémoc)
Costa Rica (p) | 1 (5)
Haiti | 1 (3)
4 August – Puebla (Cuauhtémoc)
United States | 3
Guatemala | 1
5 August – Puebla (Cuauhtémoc)
Canada (a.e.t.) | 3
Jamaica | 1
5 August – Puebla (Cuauhtémoc)
Mexico | 4
Panama | 0

Semi-finals
7 August – Mexico City
Costa Rica | 0
United States | 2
7 August – Mexico City
Canada | 1
Mexico | 2

Final
9 August – Mexico City
United States | 0
Mexico | 2

=== UEFA ===
==== Most recent stage (qualification play-offs) ====
| Team 1 | Agg. | Team 2 | 1st leg | 2nd leg |
|---|---|---|---|---|
| Denmark | 3–5 | Netherlands | 0–3 | 3–2 |
| Iceland | 2–2 (4–5 p) | Greece | 1–1 | 1–1 (a.e.t.) |
| Finland | 3–2 | Republic of Ireland | 1–0 | 2–2 (a.e.t.) |
| Turkey | 1–2 | Czech Republic | 0–1 | 1–1 |
