= Manu Ferrera =

Spanish-born Belgian football coach and former player

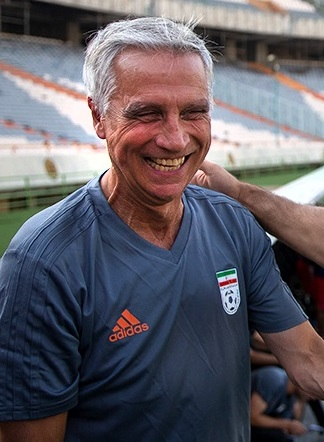

Personal information
- Full name: Manuel Ferrera
- Date of birth: 21 October 1958 (age 68)
- Place of birth: El Cerro de Andévalo, Spain
- Position: Forward

Team information
- Current team: Gent (scout)

Senior career*
Years	Team	Apps	(Gls)
1975–1980	Crossing Schaerbeek		
1981–1984	Eendracht Aalst		
1985–1986	Mazda SC		
1987	KFC Liedekerke		

Managerial career
- 1990–1991: JS Racour
- 1992–1995: RFC Seraing (youth)
- 1995–1996: RFC Seraing
- 1996–2000: RSC Anderlecht (youth)
- 2000: Sporting Charleroi
- 2001–2002: Eendracht Aalst
- 2003–2006: KV Kortrijk (sports director)
- 2006–2008: Standard Liège (assistant)
- 2008–2014: Gent (assistant)
- 2014–2019: Gent (youth)
- 2019: Iran (assistant)
- 2020–2021: Gent (U21)
- 2021–: Gent (scout)
- * Club domestic league appearances and goals

Manu Ferrera (born 21 October 1958) is a Spanish-born football coach, best known for his career in Belgium. He works as a scout for Gent.

== Career ==
=== As a player ===
He started playing football at Crossing Schaerbeek, the team in which he made his debut in the 70s. The attacker left the Third Division team in the 1980/81 season to move to Second Division team Eendracht Aalst. Over there, he played in 1984 together with Tjapko Teuben. The Dutchman, who was on loan from Club Bruges, got an offer from the Japanese team Mazda SC. Ferrera followed him and went also to Hiroshima in 1985. Due to injuries he did not play much. In 1987, he finished his career as a player in the team of Liedkerke.

=== As a trainer ===
Ferrera, who got an education as a physiotherapist in the early 90s. Afterwards, Ferrera trained JS Racour, a team from the second provincial series in Belgium. After this, he worked briefly as a representative of the sports brand Puma. In 1992, he became a youth trainer at RFC Seraing, where he worked himself up very quickly. Firstly, he was the trainer-assistant of Georges Heylens, subsequently he became the head coach himself. During the 1995/96 season, he replaced coach Jean Thissen after the first match.

After the season, Seraing was taken over by the neighbouring Standard de Liège, which made Ferrera move to RSC Anderlecht, where he worked as a youth trainer and scout. He worked closely together in that period with players such as Oleg Iachtchouk, Mark De Man, Tom Soetaers, Xavier Chen, and Olivier Deschacht.

In 2000, Enzo Scifo wanted to investigate in Sporting Charleroi. The former Gouden Schoen did not want to start as a coach himself directly and therefore asked for Emilio Ferrera as a trainer. He refused, after which Scifo asked his brother Manu. He succeeded in March 2000 Raymond Mommens and managed to keep the team in the First Division. In November, he was nevertheless dismissed. Afterwards, he required 8 million Belgian Francs (about €200,000) compensation for this dismissal.

In April 2001, Ferrera became the coach of his former team Eendracht Aalst. Once again, he managed to keep the team in First Division. In the next season, Aalst started splendidly, but then the team got a downfall. After the winter break, the Spanish-Belgian coach was dismissed.

In 2003, Ferrera was appointed as sports director at KV Kortrijk. After the winter break, he had to replace the trainer. Angelo Nijskens was dismissed in January 2004 and replaced by Ferrera, who piloted the West-Flemish team directly to the Second Division. Afterwards, the team appointed Rudi Verkempinck as the new head coach, but he was also replaced by Ferrera in September 2004. Following the season, he was once again appointed sports director. His contract finished in 2006.

In the summer of 2006, he moved to Standard de Liège. Ferrera was first the assistant of Johan Boskamp and later on his successor Michel Preud'homme. Ferrera trained at Standard top players such as Axel Witsel, Steven Defour, Milan Jovanović, and Dieumerci Mbokani. In 2008, Standard became champion in Belgium for the first time in 25 years.

Preud'homme did not stay at Standard, but surprisingly, after the title was signed at AA Gent. Ferrera followed him as assistant trainer. In 2010, they won the Belgian cup with Gent. Preud'homme went to FC Twente, but Ferrera stayed with the Buffalos. He became the assistant of Trond Sollied. As Sollied was dismissed in October 2012, Ferrera was shortly head coach. After two matches, Bob Peeters was assigned as the new trainer, after which Ferrera took his old role as trainer-assistant.

In February 2014, Ferrera became the director of the youth courses at AA Gent.

== Personal life ==
Manu Ferrera was born in the Spanish village El Cerro de Andévalo, but he moved in 1962 to Schaarbeek with his family. His brothers, Emilio and Francisco Ferrera, and his nephew Yannick, are all footballing coaches in Belgium.
