= Gunther Schepens =

Belgian footballer

Personal information
- Date of birth: 4 May 1973 (age 53)
- Place of birth: Ghent, Belgium
- Height: 1.75 m (5 ft 9 in)
- Position: Midfielder

Youth career
- VVE Massemen
- Gent

Senior career*
Years	Team	Apps	(Gls)
1991–1993	Gent	43	(5)
1993–1997	Standard Liège	114	(13)
1997–1999	Karlsruher SC	37	(4)
1999–2003	Gent	90	(27)
2003–2005	SC Bregenz	67	(17)

International career
1995–1997	Belgium	13	(3)
- * Club domestic league appearances and goals

Gunther Schepens (born 4 May 1973) is a retired Belgian footballer. At this moment, he is the technical coördinator of the youth teams of the football team K.A.A. Gent. He is also co-responsible for the scouting of new players.

== Career ==
Schepens began his career 1981 in the youth of the local team Eendracht Massemen. 1985 the Young central player was transferred to K.A.A. Gent, where he had to wait until 1991 before he could make his debut in the first team. In his second year in the team of the "Buffalos" he started to play regularly. A year later he was transferred during winter to Standard Liège.

In 1994–95, he almost became champion with Standard Liège. The team ended on the second spot, behind RSC Anderlecht. Schepens was in that period one of the key players of Standard, together with Marc Wilmots, Gilbert Bodart, Régis Genaux, Philippe Léonard and Michaël Goossens. 1997 he left the team and went during summer to the German team Karlsruher SC. In his first season, he became a key player in the team, but one year later he didn't get many chances anymore in the team. This was why, 1999 he decided to return to Belgium.

Over there, he started to work in the team where it all began for him, KAA Gent. In his second period in Gent, the team grew to its top-level as a real subtop-team. The team got some strong players, such as keeper and team icon Frédéric Herpoel and striker Alexandros Kaklamanos. 2003 Schepens changed Gent for the Austrian team SW Bregenz.

He played two more years in Bregenz, after which he stopped definitively in the highest series due to a knee injury. Three years after his last game he started to play again in the team of Eendracht Massemen. He also plays in the futsal team De Woody's, of which the trainer is the Belgian writer and columnist Herman Brusselmans. Just like Brusselmans, Schepens sometimes is the analyst in the football program Studio 1 op zondag on the public broadcast company. In the summer of 2010, he analysed a big deal of the games of the World Championship football in South Africa on the Belgian television channel Canvas. He is well known on the Flemish television because of this humoristic remarks and enlarged football knowledge. Schepens was a thirteen-time international for the Belgium national team Rode Duivels.

== Career statistics ==
=== International goals ===
#	Date	Venue	Opponent	Score	Result	Competition
1.	22 April 1995	Edmond Machtens Stadium, Molenbeek-Saint-Jean, Belgium	United States	1–0	Win	Friendly
2.	26 April 1995	Constant Vanden Stock Stadium, Anderlecht, Belgium	Cyprus	2–0	Win	Euro 1996 qualifying
3.	7 June 1995	Gradski Stadion, Skopje, Macedonia	North Macedonia	0–5	Win	Euro 1996 qualifying

== Honours ==
- 13 selections and 3 goals in the national team of Belgium as from 1995 to 1997
- vice-champion of Belgium in 1995 with Standard Liège
