= Tibe De Vlieger =

Swiss footballers

- De Vlieger with Gent in 2026

Personal information
- Date of birth: 5 November 2005 (age 21)
- Place of birth: Ghent, Belgium
- Height: 1.82 m (6 ft 0 in)
- Position: Attacking midfielder

Team information
- Current team: Gent
- Number: 27

Youth career
- 2014–2022: Gent

Senior career*
Years	Team	Apps	(Gls)
2022–	Jong KAA Gent	53	(17)
2024–	Gent	40	(1)

International career^{‡}
2024	Belgium U19	3	(0)
2026–	Belgium U21	4	(0)
- * Club domestic league appearances and goals as of 25 October 2026 ‡ National team caps and goals as of 15:26, 18 November 2026 (UTC)

Tibe De Vlieger (born 5 November 2005) is a Belgian professional footballer who plays as an attacking midfielder for Gent and Jong KAA Gent.

== Club career ==
De Vlieger is a youth product of Gent, having joined as a U10 in 2014. On 13 December 2021 he signed his first professional contract with the club, and was promoted to their reserve side. On 2 January 2023, he extended his contract with the club until 2025.

=== Gent ===
He made his senior and professional debut with Gent as a substitute in a 1–0 Belgian Cup loss to Club Brugge KV on 16 January 2024. On 13 February 2024, he again extended his contract until 2027.

== International career ==
De Vlieger is a youth international for Belgium, having played for the Belgium U19s.

== Career statistics ==
As of match played 25 October 2026

Appearances and goals by club, season and competition
Club	Season	League			Cup		Europe		Other		Total	
Club	Season	Division	Apps	Goals	Apps	Goals	Apps	Goals	Apps	Goals	Apps	Goals
Jong Gent	2022–23	Belgian Division 3	16	2	—		—		—		16	2
Jong Gent	2023–24	Belgian Division 3	18	9	—		—		—		18	9
Jong Gent	2024–25	Belgian Division 3	11	2	—		—		—		11	2
Jong Gent	Total		45	13	—		—		—		45	13
Gent	2023–24	Belgian Pro League	3	0	1	0	1 (Note: Appearances in UEFA Conference League)	0	—		5	0
Gent	2024–25	Belgian Pro League	5	0	2	0	5	0	—		12	0
Gent	2025–26	Belgian Pro League	24	0	2	0	—		—		26	0
Gent	2026–27	Belgian Pro League	8	1	1	0	8	0	—		17	1
Gent	Total		40	1	6	0	14	0	—		60	1
Career total			85	14	6	0	14	0	0	0	105	14
