= Herman Vermeulen =

Belgian football manager (born 1954)

Personal information
- Date of birth: 10 November 1954 (age 71)
- Place of birth: Temse, Belgium
- Position: Midfielder

Team information
- Current team: Waasland-Beveren

Youth career
- 1966–1972: SpvG Porz

Senior career*
Years	Team	Apps	(Gls)
1972–1978	FC Eil		
1978–1980	RSV Urbach		
1980–1983	Bensberg		
1983–1986	FC Weiden		

Managerial career
- Years: Club
- 1987–1989: SV Grembergshoven
- 1989–1991: FC Junkersdorf
- 1991–1993: Patro Eisden
- 1993–1995: SK Kermt
- 1995–2005: Gent (assistant)
- 2005: Oostende
- 2005–2006: Sint-Truiden
- 2006: Olympiacos (assistant)
- 2006–2008: Olympiacos (youth)
- 2009–2010: Genk (youth)
- 2011–2012: Lierse (assistant)
- 2013: Elazığspor (assistant)
- 2014: OH Leuven (assistant)
- 2014: OH Leuven
- 2014: OH Leuven (assistant)
- 2015–: Waasland-Beveren (assistant)
- * Club domestic league appearances and goals

Herman Vermeulen (born 10 November 1954) is a Belgian football manager who is assistant manager at Waasland-Beveren.
