= Josué Vergara =

Panamanian association football player (born 2007)

Personal information
- Full name: Josué Yamir Vergara Ortega
- Date of birth: 25 July 2007 (age 19)
- Place of birth: Panama City, Panama
- Height: 1.96 m (6 ft 5 in)
- Position: Striker

Team information
- Current team: Gent
- Number: 47

Youth career
- –2024: Tauro

Senior career*
Years	Team	Apps	(Gls)
2024–2026	Tauro	35	(5)
2026	Auda	20	(14)
2026–	Gent	7	(3)

International career^{‡}
2025–	Panama U20	4	(2)
2026–	Panama	1	(1)
- * Club domestic league appearances and goals as of 18 September 2026 ‡ National team caps and goals as of 5 October 2026

Josué Yamir Vergara Ortega (born 25 July 2007) is a Panamanian professional footballer who plays as a striker for Belgian Pro League team Gent and the Panama national team.

== Club career ==
=== Tauro ===
Vergara was born in Panama City, and began his career with Tauro FC. Vergara made his debut for Tauro at 17 years and 16 days old, in a 0–0 draw against Alianza. Vergara scored his first goal in a 2–1 loss to Veraguas United, finishing the season with 3 goals in 11 matches. The following season, Vergara scored 2 goals in 24 games in the league for Tauro.

=== FK Auda ===
In February 2026, Vergara signed for Latvian Higher League side FK Auda. In his first game against SK Super Nova, Vergara registered a goal and an assist in a 2–1 win. Vergara would follow that up with goals against Riga, RFS and Liepaja, as well as netting braces against FS Jelgava, Super Nova, and Grobiņa. Vergara was awarded Virslīga player of the month for April, and was the league's top scorer. Vergara scored his final goal for Auda in a 2-0 away win over Super Nova in June 2026, eventually finishing with 14 goals in 20 appearances.

=== Gent ===
Vergara was announced as a new signing for Belgian Pro League side KAA Gent on 17 June 2026, for a reported fee of €3 million. Vergara registered his first Gent goal in a 2-0 win over Mechelen on his Belgian Pro League debut.

== International career ==
Vergara was selected in a 28-man preliminary training squad for Panama U20 prior to the 2025 FIFA U-20 World Cup, however he did not make the final squad.

Vergara was selected in the under–20 squad for the 2025 Central American Games, scoring 2 goals in 4 matches.

Vergara was called up to the senior national team for the first time in September 2026 for the September–October friendlies in India and Japan. Vergara was forced to withdraw from the squad for the team's games against India and New Zealand, before making his debut and scoring in a 1–1 draw against Ecuador (winnning 7–6 on penalties) in Tokyo on his debut in the Kirin Cup.

== Personal life ==
Vergara is the son of former footballer Davis Vergara.

== Career statistics ==
=== Club ===
As of match played 18 September 2026

Appearances and goals by club, season and competition
Club	Season	League			National cup		Continental		Other		Total	
Club	Season	Division	Apps	Goals	Apps	Goals	Apps	Goals	Apps	Goals	Apps	Goals
Tauro	2024	Liga LPF	11	3	—		—		—		11	3
Tauro	2025	Liga LPF	24	2	—		—		—		24	2
Tauro	Total		35	5	0	0	0	0	0	0	35	5
FK Auda	2026	Latvian Higher League	20	14	0	0	0	0	0	0	20	14
Gent	2026–27	Belgian Pro League	7	3	0	0	6 (Note: Appearances in UEFA Conference League)	1	—		13	4
Career total			62	22	0	0	6	1	0	0	68	23

=== International ===
As of match played 5 October 2026

Appearances and goals by national team and year
National team	Year	Apps	Goals
Panama	2026	1	1
Total		1	1

Scores and results list Panama's goal tally first, score column indicates score after each Vergara goal.

List of international goals scored by Josué Vergara
No.	Date	Venue	Cap	Opponent	Score	Result	Competition
1	5 October 2026	Japan National Stadium, Tokyo, Japan	1	Ecuador	1–0	1–1 (7–6 p)	2026 Kirin Cup Soccer
