= Roland Storme =

Belgian footballer

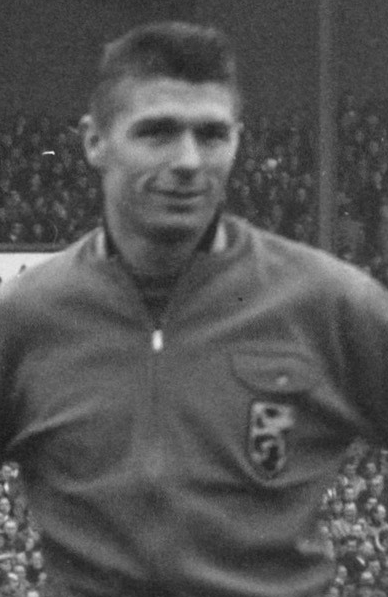
- Storme in 1961

Personal information
- Date of birth: 25 January 1934
- Place of birth: Belgium
- Date of death: 20 November 2022 (aged 88)
- Place of death: Ichtegem
- Position: Defender

Youth career
- Roeselare

Senior career*
Years	Team	Apps	(Gls)
1954–1960	K.A.A. Gent	301	(15)
1960–1964	Club Brugge		
1964–1965	K.A.A. Gent		

International career
1958–1962	Belgium	10	(0)

Managerial career
- 1976–1977: K.A.A. Gent
- * Club domestic league appearances and goals

Roland Storme (25 January 1934 – 20 November 2022) was a Belgian football player who won the Belgian Golden Shoe in 1958 while at K.A.A. Gent. He played his debut in the national team the same year in a friendly win to Switzerland. Until 1962 Storme played 10 times for Belgium. In the early 1960s, he moved to Club Brugge.

== Career ==
Born in Roeselare, Storme began playing football with local side Roeselare. At age 17, he signed for K.A.A. Gent, the second most expensive transfer in Belgian football history at the time. The Belgian First Division was not fully professional at the time, so Storme worked in his parents' business and for a coal company while training with Gent in the evenings.

After impressing during an international match against France, Storme was scouted by Atletico Madrid, but Gent refused their approach. Consequently, Club Brugge manager Norberto Höfling was able to bring Storme to the club in 1960. After four seasons with Brugge, he returned to Gent for one season before finishing his career in the lower levels of Belgian football with Wervik, Eeklo, Roeselare and Doornik.
