= Freddy Qvick =

Belgian footballer (1940–2021)

Personal information
- Date of birth: 6 November 1940
- Place of birth: Ostend, Belgium
- Date of death: 26 June 2021 (aged 80)
- Place of death: Geel, Belgium
- Position: Striker

Senior career*
Years	Team	Apps	(Gls)
1958–1961	AS Oostende		
1967–1970	AS Oostende		

Managerial career
- KSC Menen
- VG Oostende
- AS Oostende
- SK Roeselare
- 1976: AA Gent
- * Club domestic league appearances and goals

Freddy Qvick (6 November 1940 – 26 June 2021) was a Belgian football player and coach.

== Career ==
Qvick spent most of his career with AS Oostende. He made his debut for the first team in the 1956–57 season and played there until 1970. In 1958, the club relegated to the Belgian Third Division. Three years later, the club became champions in the Third Division A. In 1969, the club became champion in the Belgian Second Division, after which he led the club in the 1969–70 Belgian First Division. Later, he became a coach at KSC Menen, VG Oostende, AS Oostende, SK Roeselare and KAA Gent (1976).

In 1974, he founded the Bal-Bal-school to teach children how to play football without them already playing in a team. Qvick also worked as a Physical education teacher and at the Zeepreventorium in De Haan.

== Death ==
Qvick died in June 2021 at the age of 80.
