= Amir Bouhamdi =

Moroccan footballer

Personal information
- Date of birth: June 17, 2008 (age 18)
- Place of birth: Sittard, Netherlands
- Position: Winger

Team information
- Current team: PSV Eindhoven/ Jong PSV
- Number: 37

Youth career
- BSV Limburgia
- 2015–2017: Roda
- 2017–2025: PSV

Senior career*
Years	Team	Apps	(Gls)
2025–	Jong PSV	12	(1)
2026–	PSV	6	(0)

International career^{‡}
2025	Netherlands U18	2	(0)
2026–	Morocco U23	1	(1)
- * Club domestic league appearances and goals as of 17 October 2026 ‡ National team caps and goals as of 1 October 2026

Amir Bouhamdi (Arabic: أمير بوحمدي; born 17 June 2008) is a professional footballer who plays as a winger for Eredivisie club PSV Eindhoven and their reserve team Jong PSV. Born in the Netherlands, he represented both Netherlands and Morocco at a youth level.

== Club career ==
Bouhamdi is a product of the youth academies of the Dutch clubs BSV Limburgia, Roda, and PSV, where he finished his development. On 28 May 2025, he signed his first professional contract with PSV and was promoted to their reserves in the Eerste Divisie. He made 10 appearances with Jong PSV, and strong performances in his debut season in the UEFA Youth League. He debuted with the senior PSV team in the 2026 Johan Cruyff Shield, a 4–0 loss to AZ Alkmaar on 2 August 2026.

== International career ==
Born in the Netherlands, Bouhamdi is of Moroccan descent and holds dual Dutch and Moroccan citizenship. He has represented both the Netherlands and Morocco at youth international level. He was called up to the Morocco U20s for a training camp in March 2026.

In October 2026, Bouhamdi made his debut for Morocco U23 in a friendly against Mali and scored in a 1–1 draw.

== Career statistics ==
As of match played 20 October 2026

Appearances and goals by club, season and competition
Club	Season	League			Cup		Europe		Other		Total	
Club	Season	Division	Apps	Goals	Apps	Goals	Apps	Goals	Apps	Goals	Apps	Goals
Jong PSV	2025–26	Eerste Divisie	10	1	—		—		1 (Note: Appearance in Premier League Cup)	0	11	1
Jong PSV	2026–27	Eerste Divisie	2	0	—		—		0	0	2	0
Jong PSV	Total		12	1	—		—		1	0	13	1
PSV	2026–27	Eredivisie	6	0	0	0	1	0	1 (Note: Appearance in Johan Cruyff Shield)	0	8	0
Career total			18	1	0	0	1	0	2	0	21	1
