= Kevin Wangaya =

Kenyan footballer (born 2005)

Personal information
- Full name: Kevin Injehu Wangaya
- Date of birth: 30 November 2005 (age 20)
- Height: 1.70 m (5 ft 7 in)
- Position: Midfielder

Team information
- Current team: Ligi Ndogo SC

Youth career
- 2018–2019: Ligi Ndogo SC
- 2019–2020: FKF Centre of Excellence

Senior career*
Years	Team	Apps	(Gls)
2020–2021	Ligi Ndogo SC	0	(0)
2022–2024	Kariobangi Sharks	15	(2)
2024	FK Apolonia Fier	5	(0)
2024–	Ligi Ndogo SC	0	(0)

International career^{‡}
2019	Kenya U15	6	(3)
2020	Kenya U17	4	(2)
2023	Kenya U18	6	(3)
2024–	Kenya U20	9	(5)
- * Club domestic league appearances and goals as of 14 May 2025 ‡ National team caps and goals as of 14 May 2025

Kevin Injehu Wangaya (born 30 November 2005) is a Kenyan professional footballer who plays as a midfielder for Kenyan club Nairobi United FC, and Kenya U20.

== Club career ==
Wangaya started his football at Ligi Ndogo SC before making a move to Kenyan Premier League side FC Kariobangi Sharks in 2022.

After Sharks he was off to Albania for a short stint at second-tier side FK Apolonia Fier from January 2024 before returning to Ligi Ndogo.

== International career ==
Internationally, Wangaya has turned out for Kenya U15, U17, U18 and the U20 national teams. He was part of the Kenya U20 squad that featured in the 2025 U-20 Africa Cup of Nations where he scored once against Nigeria and named man of the match. He was also named in the group stage best eleven.
