= Kelly Madada =

Kenyan professional footballer

Personal information
- Full name: Kelly Okonji Madada
- Date of birth: 1 January 2006 (age 20)
- Height: 1.72 m (5 ft 8 in)
- Position: Midfielder

Team information
- Current team: AFC Leopards
- Number: 88

Senior career*
| Years | Team | Apps | (Gls) |
- AFC Leopards

International career^{‡}
| | Kenya | 1 | |
- * Club domestic league appearances and goals as of 10 June 2026 ‡ National team caps and goals as of 10 June 2026

Kelly Okonji Madada (born 1 January 2006) is a Kenyan professional footballer who plays as a midfielder. He currently plays for AFC Leopards in the Kenyan Premier League and wears the number 88. He has made one appearance for the Kenyan national football team, as well as two for the Kenyan U20 national team.
