= Frédéric Herpoel =

Belgian footballer

Personal information
- Full name: Frédéric Herpoel
- Date of birth: 16 August 1974 (age 52)
- Place of birth: Mons, Belgium
- Height: 1.83 m (6 ft 0 in)
- Position: Goalkeeper

Youth career
- 1988–1993: Anderlecht

Senior career*
Years	Team	Apps	(Gls)
1993–1997	Anderlecht	4	(0)
1997–2007	Gent	328	(2)
2007–2010	Mons	50	(0)
Total		382	(2)

International career
1994–1995	Belgium U-21	11	(0)
1999–2004	Belgium	7	(0)
- * Club domestic league appearances and goals

Frédéric Herpoel (Dutch pronunciation: [ˈfreːdərɪk ˈɦɛrpul]; born 16 August 1974) is a Belgian former professional footballer who played as a goalkeeper.

== Career ==
Herpoel was born in Mons. At the age of 7 he began to play for S.C. Havré and then moved to Anderlecht in 1988 where he played in the youth team. Between 1993 (his arrival in the senior squad) and 1997, Herpoel only played four Jupiler League games for the Brussels side.

Herpoel signed for Gent in 1997 and played regularly for them for over a decade, before joining Mons. Herpoel was selected 39 times for Belgium but he gathered only seven caps. He was in the team for the Euro 2000 as third goalie and the 2002 World Cup as second goalie. He was the second choice after Geert De Vlieger when Robert Waseige was the national team manager, and later after Silvio Proto when Aimé Anthuenis coached the national team, whereupon he decided to quit the national team in 2005, disappointed not to be chosen as the first choice goalkeeper.

== Honours ==
Anderlecht

- Belgian First Division: 1993–94, 1994–95, 1994–95
- Belgian Cup: 1993–94, runner-up 1996–97
- Belgian Super Cup: 1993, 1995

Belgium

- FIFA Fair Play Trophy: 2002 World Cup

Individual

- Best AA Gent-Player of the Season: 2001–02, 2002–03, 2003–04, 2004–05
- Man of the Season (Belgian First Division): 2002–03
- Belgian Goalkeeper of the Year: 2004
- Belgian Fair Play Award: 2006–07, 2007–08
