= Mpho Padime =

South African soccer player (born 2007)

Mpho "Phopho" Padime (born 11 June 2007) is a South African professional soccer player who plays as a attacking midfielder or winger for Orlando Pirates F.C..

He joined the Orlando Pirates first team at training camp in 2026 and made his debut as a substitute in the MTN 8 semi-final between Pirates and Sekhukhune United F.C. on 29 August 2026, helping to set up the goal by Kamogelo Sebelebele which resulted in a 3–0 win for Pirates.
