= Ibrahima Cissé (footballer, born 2007) =

Senegalese footballer (born 2007)

- Cissé with Gent in 2026

Personal information
- Date of birth: 24 September 2007 (age 19)
- Height: 1.97 m (6 ft 6 in)
- Position: Forward

Team information
- Current team: Gent
- Number: 75

Youth career
- CO Thiessois

Senior career*
Years	Team	Apps	(Gls)
2025–2026	Jong Gent	7	(1)
2025–	Gent	20	(5)
- * Club domestic league appearances and goals as of 17 November 2026

Ibrahima Cissé (born 24 September 2007) is a Senegalese professional footballer who plays as a forward for Gent.

== Club career ==
Cissé is a youth product of CO Thiessois, a club based in Thiès, in the eponym Senegalese region. In October 2025, he signed his first professional contract with Gent in Belgium.

After playing with Gent's reserve team in the Challenger Pro League for the first few months, Cissé made his first team debut with Gent in a Belgian Pro League game with KV Mechelen on 8 March 2026. Coming on as an early replacement for injured Wilfried Kanga, he already scored his first goal with the team, the last of a 3–1 win.

In the summer 2026, after his first pro season, approaches where reported from clubs such as Olympique Lyonnais, Bournemouth and Paris FC, while bigger foreign teams where also said to have observed him.

He started the following season as a regular goalscorer, netting one in two of the first three league games.
