= Abdoulaye Camara (footballer, born 2006) =

Guinean footballer (born 2006)

Personal information
- Full name: Abdoulaye Kolev Camara
- Date of birth: 21 December 2006 (age 19)
- Place of birth: Conakry, Guinea
- Position: Winger

Team information
- Current team: Vejle
- Number: 20

Youth career
- Académie GFI
- → Académie SOAR (loan)
- 2025–: Vejle

Senior career*
| Years | Team | Apps | (Gls) |
| 2025– | Vejle | 19 | (1) |

International career^{‡}
| 2026– | Guinea | 1 | (0) |
- * Club domestic league appearances and goals as of 19 May 2026 ‡ National team caps and goals as of 15:04, 24 April 2026 (UTC)

Abdoulaye Kolev Camara (born 21 December 2006) is a Guinean professional footballer who plays as a winger for Danish Superliga club Vejle Boldklub and the Guinea national team.

== Career ==
Born in Guinea, Camara is a product of Académie GFI; an academy in Conakry, founded in 2021. In Guinea, he earned the nickname 'Dembele' due to his speed and technique. During his time at GFI, he was also associated with Académie SOAR on several occasions, where he played matches for the club.

On 29 June 2025, Danish Superliga club Vejle Boldklub confirmed that Camara was on trial and participated in a friendly match against Esbjerg fB, where Camara also managed to score a goal. A few weeks later, on 17 July 2025, it was confirmed, that Camara had signed a four-year contract with the Danish club.

On 20 July 2025, Camara got his debut for Vejle in a Danish Superliga gama against Randers FC, where he also scored to the final result 1–1.

== International career ==
Camara was called up to the Guinea national team for a set of friendlies in March 2026.
