= El Cerro de Andévalo =

Town and municipality of Spain

Coordinates: 37°44′N 6°56′W

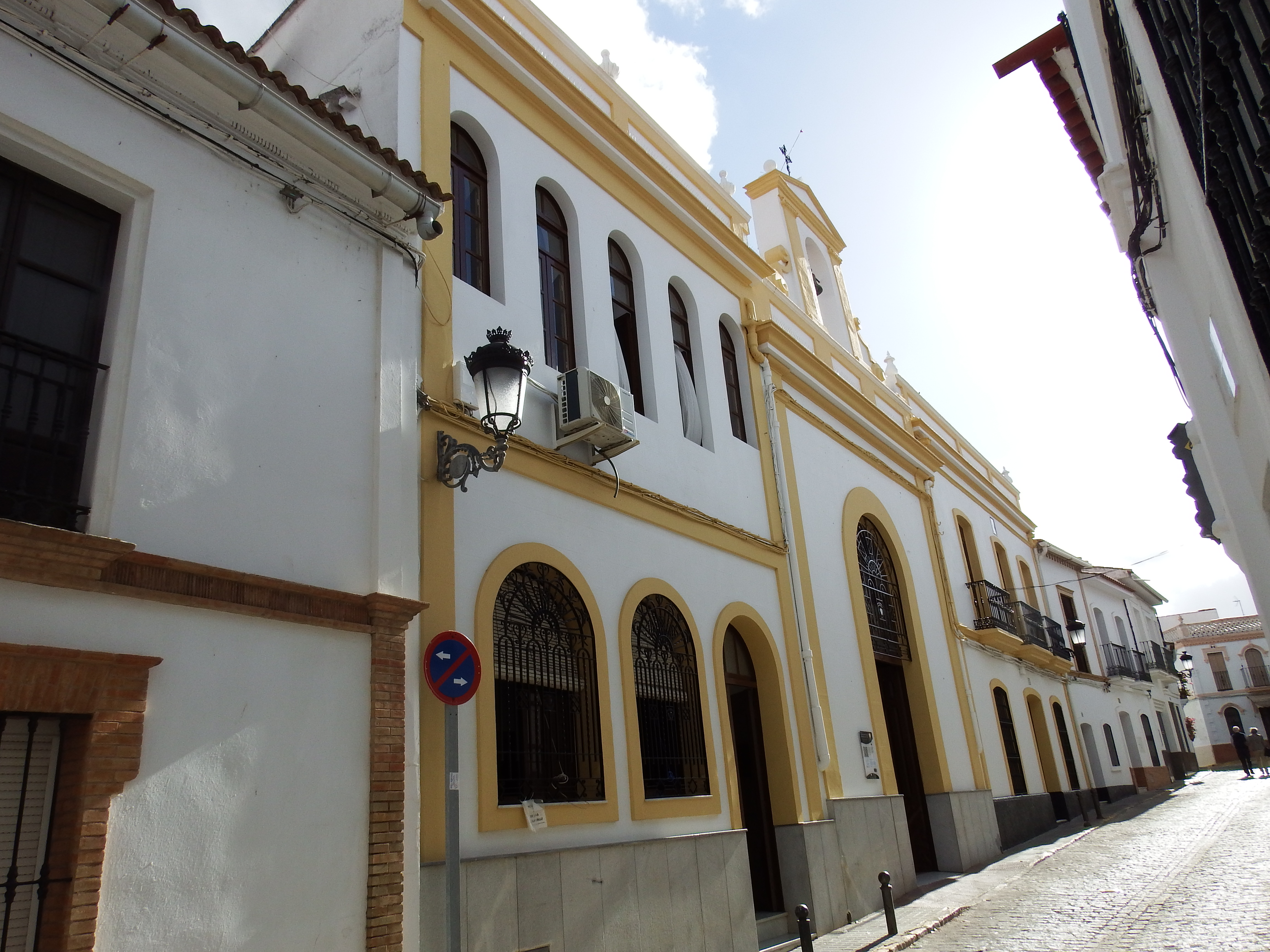

- Flag Coat of arms

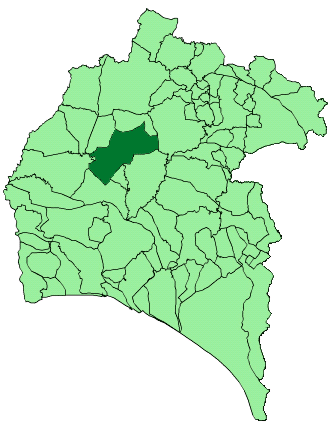
- Map of El Cerro de Andévalo, Huelva
- Country: Spain
- Autonomous community: Andalusia
- Province: Huelva
- Time zone: UTC+1 (CET)
  - Summer (DST): UTC+2 (CEST)

El Cerro de Andévalo is a town and municipality located in the province of Huelva, Spain. According to the 2025 census, the municipality has a population of 2,252 inhabitants.

== See also ==
- List of municipalities in Huelva
