= KAA Gent =

Belgian professional football club

- Full name: Koninklijke Atletiek Associatie Gent
- Nickname: De Buffalo's (The Buffalos) Gantoise
- Founded: 1864; 162 years ago (as a gymnastics association); 1900; 126 years ago (as a football association)
- Ground: Planet Group Arena
- Capacity: 20,175
- Chairman: Sam Baro
- Sporting Director: Arnar Viðarsson
- Head coach: Rik De Mil
- League: Belgian Pro League
- 2025–26: Belgian Pro League, 5th of 16
- Website: www.kaagent.be
Home colours	Away colours	Third colours

Koninklijke Atletiek Associatie Gent (Dutch pronunciation: [ˈkoːnɪŋkləkə ʔɑtləˈtik ɑsoːˈɕaːsi ˈɣɛnt]; English: Royal Athletic Association Ghent), often simply known as Gent or by their nickname De Buffalo's (English: The Buffalos), is a Belgian professional sports club, based in the city of Ghent, East Flanders. Their football team is the best known section within the club and has been playing in the Belgian First Division A since the 1989–90 season. They won the national league once, in 2014–15, in addition to four Belgian Cup victories. Gent played their home matches in the Jules Ottenstadion in Gentbrugge from 1920 until 2013, when they moved to the Planet Group Arena. Their team colours are blue and white. The principal sponsor is Baloise, with Hamann International Logistics sponsoring for the UEFA Conference League matches.

The field hockey and track and field divisions were founded in 1864, making it one of the oldest sports clubs in Belgium. The club was then known under its French name La Gantoise (and it is still referred to as such in the French-speaking part of Belgium). They changed their name to the current Dutch version in 1971. The football division opened in 1900. The nickname of the club is De Buffalo's, a term coined after a visit of the original Buffalo Bill and his Wild West circus to the city in the early 20th century. Their logo features a Native American in profile. The origins of this logo are attributed to the feather headdresses worn by the Indian chiefs who performed with Buffalo Bill, though this logo has garnered some controversy in recent years.

Gent enjoyed its first spell at the highest level in Belgian football between 1913–14 and 1928–29, and a second one from 1936–37 to 1966–67. In the 1970s and 1980s, the club had several promotions and relegations between the first and second divisions, before returning to the highest level in 1989. The club reached the quarter-finals of the 1991–92 UEFA Cup, which is their best achievement ever in European competitions.

Aside from football, Gent also have other sports sections in track and field and field hockey.

== History ==
=== Formation ===
In 1864, an association called the 'Société Gymnastique la Gantoise', which was tasked with promoting gymnastics, was founded. Some branches quickly became independent and in 1891 the team merged with the Association Athlétique, which was in itself a merger of younger teams, such as Racing Club, Running Club and Red Star. The new merger team was called Association Athlétique La Gantoise, and aside from gymnastics, the activities were broadened to athletics, boxing, cricket, cycling, fencing, hockey, swimming and tennis. In this context, the athletics team KAA Gent was founded.

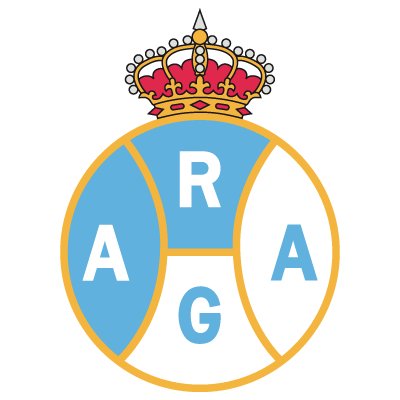
1914 logo of La Gantoise

In the last decade of the 19th century, organized football was introduced in Ghent. Different small teams were founded and some merged into Racing Club Gantois on 1 April 1899, which would later become the biggest challenger of KAA Gent. Only in 1900, a football section was founded by the students of the College of Melle, which is a place close to Ghent. The first president of the team was doctor Hector Priem. The games were played on the Carpentierplein, which was situated at the crossroads of the Kortrijksesteenweg, the Clementinalaan, the Oostendestraat and the Astridlaan. Initially, the colours black and white were chosen, but by 31 October 1900, when the team became an official member, the colours were changed to blue and white. On 15 November 1900, the first regular game was played, against Omnium Sporting Club.

=== Early 20th century ===
For the first few years, the team mostly played in the Belgian Second Division, and later on in the First Division. In 1904 the team moved to the Mussenstraat. In 1913, the World Exposition was held at that place, and the team moved once more, this time to the Albertlaan. Over there, a football pitch, training fields, tennis courts, an athletics court, galleries and other accommodations were being built. At 9 December 1915, during the First World War, the stadium completely burned down. In 1912–13, AA La Gantoise became champion in the Second Division. In 1914, the team received the royal title and was called Association Royale Athlétique La Gantoise, which was abbreviated to ARA La Gantoise. During the world exposition, the team organized several sporting events. The first season in the First League, 1913–14, was nevertheless very difficult for the team and only by means of a test match against Standard Club Liégois, relegation was avoided.

In 1920, the team moved again, this time to Gentbrugge, where the Jules Ottenstadion was built. La Gantoise fell back to the Second Division and it was not until 1936 it managed to win the promotion play-offs and return to the First Division. In the mid-fifties, the team played their strongest football yet. In 1953–54 it ended third with an equal total of points as KFC Malinois and only one point behind the champions Anderlecht. The next season, La Gantoise was alone on the second spot, this time with three points less than the champions. In 1964 it won the Belgian Cup (Beker van België), which was the first major tournament victory for the team. Because of their cup win, it became the first Belgian team to participate in the European Cup Winners' Cup. La Gantoise was defeated in the first round by West Ham United. In 1967, the club relegated once more, after three decades of playing in the First Division. It did, however, only take them one year to clinch promotion again.

=== Late 20th century ===
In 1971, the name of the team was translated into Flemish, as it became "Koninklijke Atletiek Associatie Gent" (commonly known as KAA Gent or AA Gent). The 1970–71 season was the start of a bad decade for Gent. They were relegated to the Second Division six games before the season's ending, after the defeat to Club Brugge. In 1974, they even relegated to the Third Division. Gent had ended last and couldn't assure its promotion to the Second Division in the final round. After one season, they would return to the Second Division and remained there until 1980, when the team returned to the First Division. The 1980s would become a much better period for the team. In 1984 they won the Belgian Cup again, and during that period the team played in European competitions four times. In 1986–87, Gent reached the Third round in the UEFA Cup.

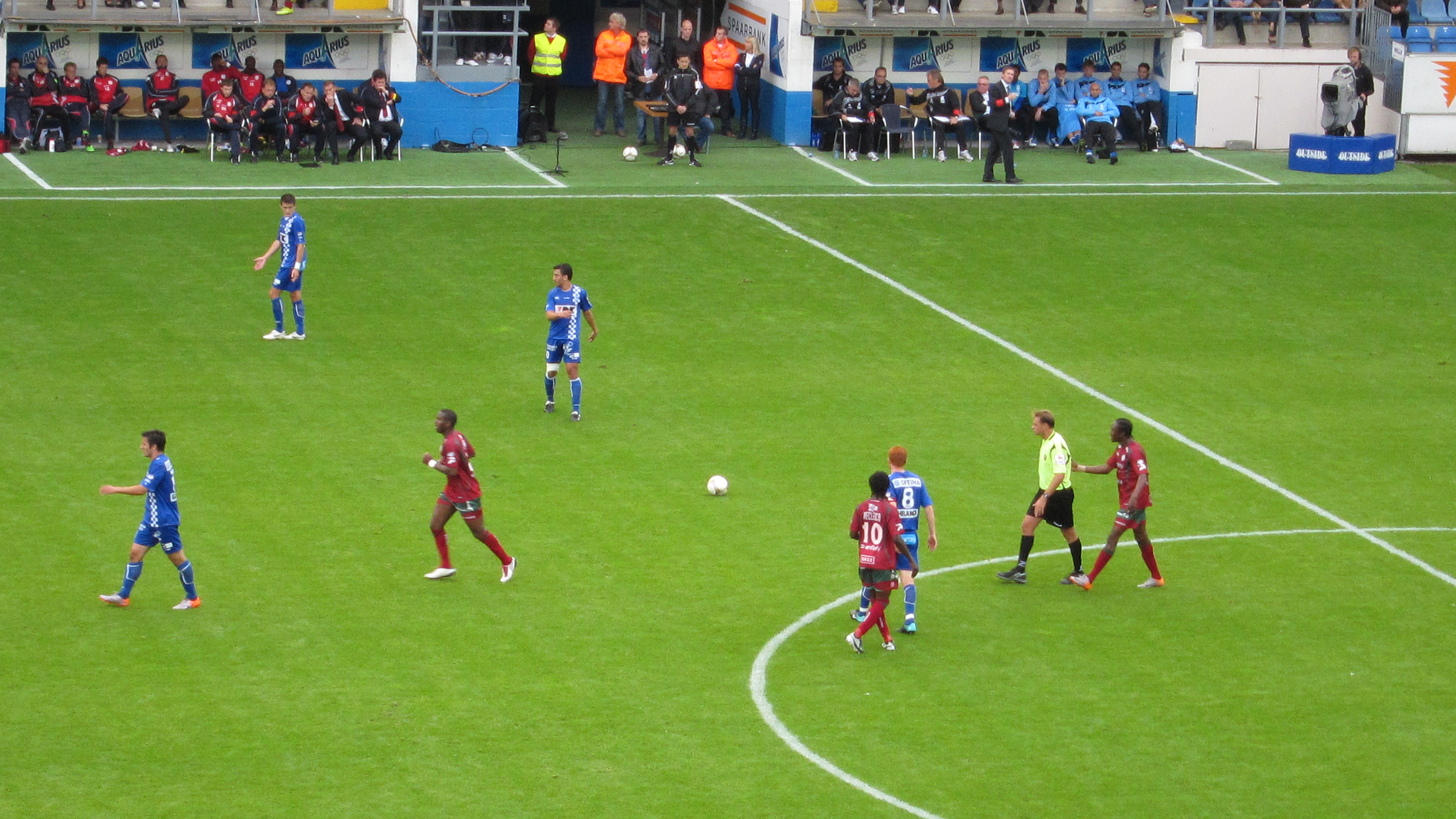
During a 2010 game against SV Zulte Waregem

In 1990–91, the team played at the top of the standings for a long time, under the guidance of René Vandereycken and players such as Frank Dauwen, Eric Viscaal and Erwin Vandenbergh, but finally it ended on the third spot. So instead of competing in the UEFA Champions League, the team played in the UEFA Cup in 1991. After defeating Lausanne-Sport, Eintracht Frankfurt and Dynamo Moscow, Gent played the quarter finals against Ajax. The following years, Gent fell back to the lower places in the standings. From 1994 until 1997, they finished just above the relegation places in the league. By the end of the 1990s the results improved again, and with coach Trond Sollied, KAA Gent qualified for European football once more in 1999–00. In these series, Gent lost heavily against Ajax, under new coach Henk Houwaart. The next season, Gent reached the UEFA Intertoto Cup, where they would reach the semi-finals against PSG. The following seasons, league results varied between lower sub-top places and top four finishes.

=== 2000s ===
In 2004, Gent signed coach Georges Leekens. In his first season, the team ended at the sixth spot in competition. With Leekens as a coach, KAA Gent made some impressive performances, such as the 4–1 victory over rival Club Brugge on 1 April 2006. In 2006–07, despite a weak start of the competition, the team managed to reach the fourth place in the Belgian Pro League. It repeated that achievement the following year.

The next season, coach Georges Leekens left the club and joined Lokeren. Trond Sollied, the Norwegian trainer who had been very successful seven years before, succeeded him. Under his guidance, KAA Gent played its third Cup Final, in which it only lost at the end from Anderlecht. Sollied left Gent again after one season, this time for Heerenveen. Michel Preud'homme, who had just become champion of the Jupiler Pro League with Standard Liège, signed a contract for three seasons, together with his colleagues Manu Ferrera and Stan van den Buys. In 2008–09, the team ended at the fourth spot, after a strong comeback in the second part of the competition, with an equal number of points as Club Brugge, who had won one more game and ended third.

In 2009–10, there was a heavy battle for second place in the Belgian Pro League between Gent and Club Brugge and the Champions League ticket that came with it. They played each other on 8 May 2010. Gent won by a convincing 6–2 score to earn Champions League football. One week later, Gent also won the Belgian Cup for the first time in 26 years, defeating the other Bruges Pro League team, Cercle Brugge.

=== 2010s ===
On 17 July 2013, the club officially inaugurated their new stadium, the Ghelamco Arena, with a 2–0 win over VfB Stuttgart in a gala match.

On 21 May 2015, Gent clinched their first Belgium League title by defeating Standard Liège 2–0 at home, automatically qualifying for the group stage of the UEFA Champions League. Gent were drawn in Group H, against Russian champions Zenit Saint Petersburg, the Spanish team Valencia and the French Lyon. On matchday 1, Gent draw 1–1 with Olympique Lyon at Ghelamco Arena, securing their first point in the Champions League group stages. In matchday 2, they were beaten by Zenit 1–2 at Petrovsky Stadium, Saint Petersburg, Russia. On matchday 3, they lost again 1–2 against Valencia at Mestalla, Valencia, Spain. On matchday 4, at Ghelamco Arena, Gent defeated Valencia 1–0, after Sven Kums successfully converted a penalty kick in the second half to obtain their first Champions League victory. On matchday 5, at Stade de Gerland, Lyon, France, Gent beat Lyon 2–1 with a dramatic winning goal with the last touch of the match in the 95th minute. On matchday 6, Gent won 2–1 against Zenit, finishing the group in second place and becoming only the second Belgian team to advance to the Champions League knockout phase after Anderlecht in 2000–01. In the round of 16, Gent were drawn against Wolfsburg. In the first leg at Ghelamco Stadium, Gent were defeated 2–3 by Wolfsburg. The second game, this time in Wolfsburg, ended 1–0, ending Gent's European tournament. However, it was the best European season for them.

In the 2016–17 season, Gent played in the Europa League. They faced Tottenham Hotspur, first winning at home in the Ghelamco Arena and then drawing in Wembley, thus advancing on aggregate. Around 8,000 KAA Gent fans attended the match in the away-end, after they were awarded an extra 1,000 tickets for their excellent reputation. In the next round they were defeated by fellow Belgian side KRC Genk.

== Rivalries ==
KAA Gent have a fierce rivalry with Club Brugge, in what is dubbed as the "Battle of Flanders" in the media as it is between Flanders' two cultural capitals (Antwerp having been historically a part of the Duchy of Brabant). There are also many Club Brugge supporters in the city of Ghent due to internal migration from West Flanders to the city, while KAA Gent pride themselves on their local identity. The nickname that KAA Gent fans give to the Club Brugge fans is the Dutch word "boeren" ("peasants"), mainly because of the agricultural background of West-Flanders but also because of the insolence that Club Brugge fans have displayed in the past.

== Honours ==
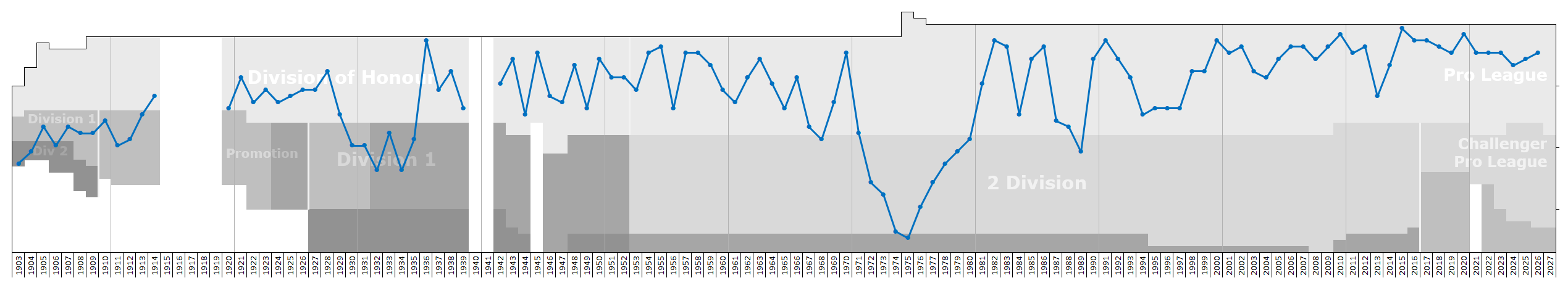
Historical chart of KAA Gent league performance

- Belgian First Division
  - Winners (1): 2014–15
  - Runners-up (3): 1954–55, 2009–10, 2019–20
- Belgian Cup
  - Winner (4): 1963–64, 1983–84, 2009–10, 2021–22
  - Runners-up (2): 2007–08, 2018–19
- Belgian Super Cup
  - Winners (1): 2015
  - Runners-up (3): 1983–84, 2010, 2022
- UEFA Intertoto Cup
  - Runners-up (2): 2006, 2007

== European record ==
Accurate as of 24 August 2022

Competition	Played	Won	Drew	Lost	GF	GA	GD	Win%
UEFA Champions League	13	4	1	8	14	23	−9	30.77
Cup Winners' Cup	4	1	1	2	2	5	−3	25.00
UEFA Cup / UEFA Europa League	81	28	21	32	108	122	−14	34.57
UEFA Europa Conference League	15	8	2	5	19	10	+9	53.33
Total	113	41	25	47	143	160	−17	36.28

Legend: GF = Goals For. GA = Goals Against. GD = Goal Difference.

=== Matches ===
Notes

- 1R: First round
- 2R: Second round
- 3R: Third round
- QR: Qualifying round
- 2Q: Second qualifying round
- 3Q: Third qualifying round
- PO: Play-off round
- KPO: Knockout play-offs
- R32: Round of 32
- R16: Round of 16
- QF: Quarter-finals

Season	Competition	Round	Opponent	Home	Away	Aggregate
1964–65	European Cup Winners' Cup	1R	(England) West Ham United	0–1	1–1	1–2
1982–83	UEFA Cup	1R	(Netherlands) Haarlem	3–3	1–2	4–5
1983–84	UEFA Cup	1R	(France) Lens	1–1	1–2	2–3
1984–85	European Cup Winners' Cup	1R	(Scotland) Celtic	1–0	0–3	1–3
1986–87	UEFA Cup	1R	(Luxembourg) Jeunesse Esch	1–1	2–1	3–2
1986–87	UEFA Cup	2R	(Romania) Sportul Studențesc	3–0	1–1	4–1
1986–87	UEFA Cup	3R	(Sweden) IFK Göteborg	0–1	0–4	0–5
1991–92	UEFA Cup	1R	(Switzerland) Lausanne-Sport	0–1	1–0 (a.e.t.)	1–1 (4–1 p)
1991–92	UEFA Cup	2R	(Germany) Eintracht Frankfurt	0–0	1–0	1–0
1991–92	UEFA Cup	3R	(Soviet Union) Dynamo Moscow	2–0	0–0	2–0
1991–92	UEFA Cup	QF	(Netherlands) Ajax	0–0	0–3	0–3
2000–01	UEFA Cup	QR	(Iceland) ÍA Akranes	3–2	3–0	6–2
2000–01	UEFA Cup	1R	(Netherlands) Ajax	0–6	0–3	0–9
2008–09	UEFA Cup	2Q	(Sweden) Kalmar	2–1	0–4	2–5
2009–10	UEFA Europa League	2Q	(Belarus) Naftan Novopolotsk	1–0	1–2	2–2 (a)
2009–10	UEFA Europa League	3Q	(Italy) Roma	1–7	1–3	2–10
2010–11	UEFA Champions League	3Q	(Ukraine) Dynamo Kyiv	1–3	0–3	1–6
2010–11	UEFA Europa League	PO	(Netherlands) Feyenoord	2–0	0–1	2–1
2010–11	UEFA Europa League	Group C	(Portugal) Sporting CP	3–1	1–5	3rd
2010–11	UEFA Europa League	Group C	(France) Lille	1–1	0–3	3rd
2010–11	UEFA Europa League	Group C	(Bulgaria) Levski Sofia	1–0	2–3	3rd
2012–13	UEFA Europa League	2Q	(Luxembourg) Differdange	3–2	1–0	4–2
2012–13	UEFA Europa League	3Q	(Hungary) Videoton	0–3	0–1	0–4
2015–16	UEFA Champions League	Group H	(France) Lyon	1–1	2–1	2nd
2015–16	UEFA Champions League	Group H	(Russia) Zenit Saint Petersburg	2–1	1–2	2nd
2015–16	UEFA Champions League	Group H	(Spain) Valencia	1–0	1–2	2nd
2015–16	UEFA Champions League	R16	(Germany) VfL Wolfsburg	2–3	0–1	2–4
2016–17	UEFA Europa League	3Q	(Romania) Viitorul Constanța	5–0	0–0	5–0
2016–17	UEFA Europa League	PO	(North Macedonia) Shkëndija	2–1	4–0	6–1
2016–17	UEFA Europa League	Group H	(Ukraine) Shakhtar Donetsk	3–5	0–5	2nd
2016–17	UEFA Europa League	Group H	(Portugal) Braga	2–2	1–1	2nd
2016–17	UEFA Europa League	Group H	(Turkey) Konyaspor	2–0	1–0	2nd
2016–17	UEFA Europa League	R32	(England) Tottenham Hotspur	1–0	2–2	3–2
2016–17	UEFA Europa League	R16	(Belgium) Genk	2–5	1–1	3–6
2017–18	UEFA Europa League	3Q	(Austria) Rheindorf Altach	1–1	1–3	2–4
2018–19	UEFA Europa League	3Q	(Poland) Jagiellonia Białystok	3–1	1–0	4–1
2018–19	UEFA Europa League	PO	(France) Bordeaux	0–0	0–2	0–2
2019–20	UEFA Europa League	2Q	(Romania) Viitorul Constanța	6–3	1–2	7–5
2019–20	UEFA Europa League	3Q	(Cyprus) AEK Larnaca	3–0	1–1	4–1
2019–20	UEFA Europa League	PO	(Croatia) Rijeka	2–1	1–1	3–2
2019–20	UEFA Europa League	Group I	(Germany) VfL Wolfsburg	2–2	3–1	1st
2019–20	UEFA Europa League	Group I	(France) Saint-Étienne	3–2	0–0	1st
2019–20	UEFA Europa League	Group I	(Ukraine) Oleksandriya	2–1	1–1	1st
2019–20	UEFA Europa League	R32	(Italy) Roma	1–1	0–1	1–2
2020–21	UEFA Champions League	3Q	(Austria) Rapid Wien	2–1	—N/a	—N/a
2020–21	UEFA Champions League	PO	(Ukraine) Dynamo Kyiv	1–2	0–3	1–5
2020–21	UEFA Europa League	Group L	(Germany) 1899 Hoffenheim	1–4	1–4	4th
2020–21	UEFA Europa League	Group L	(Serbia) Red Star Belgrade	0–2	1–2	4th
2020–21	UEFA Europa League	Group L	(Czech Republic) Slovan Liberec	1–2	0–1	4th
2021–22	UEFA Europa Conference League	2Q	(Norway) Vålerenga	4–0	0–2	4−2
2021–22	UEFA Europa Conference League	3Q	(Latvia) RFS	2–2	1–0	3–2
2021–22	UEFA Europa Conference League	PO	(Poland) Raków Częstochowa	3–0	0–1	3–1
2021–22	UEFA Europa Conference League	Group B	(Serbia) Partizan	1–1	1–0	1st
2021–22	UEFA Europa Conference League	Group B	(Estonia) Flora	1–0	1–0	1st
2021–22	UEFA Europa Conference League	Group B	(Cyprus) Anorthosis Famagusta	2–0	0–1	1st
2021–22	UEFA Europa Conference League	R16	(Greece) PAOK	1–2	0–1	1–3
2022–23	UEFA Europa League	PO	(Cyprus) Omonia	0–2	0–2	0–4
2022–23	UEFA Europa Conference League	Group F	(Norway) Molde	4–0	0–0	2nd
2022–23	UEFA Europa Conference League	Group F	(Republic of Ireland) Shamrock Rovers	3–0	1–1	2nd
2022–23	UEFA Europa Conference League	Group F	(Sweden) Djurgårdens IF	0–1	2–4	2nd
2022–23	UEFA Europa Conference League	KPO	(Azerbaijan) Qarabağ	1–0 (a.e.t.)	0–1	1–1 (5–3 p)
2022–23	UEFA Europa Conference League	R16	(Turkey) İstanbul Başakşehir	1–1	4–1	5–2
2022–23	UEFA Europa Conference League	QF	(England) West Ham United	1–1	1–4	2–5
2023–24	UEFA Europa Conference League	2Q	(Slovakia) Žilina	5–1	5–2	10–3
2023–24	UEFA Europa Conference League	3Q	(Poland) Pogoń Szczecin	5–0	1–2	6–2
2023–24	UEFA Europa Conference League	PO	(Cyprus) APOEL	2–0	2–1	4–1
2023–24	UEFA Europa Conference League	GS	(Ukraine) Zorya Luhansk	4–1	1–1	2nd
2023–24	UEFA Europa Conference League	GS	(Israel) Maccabi Tel Aviv	2–0	1–3	2nd
2023–24	UEFA Europa Conference League	GS	(Iceland) Breiðablik	5–0	3–2	2nd
2023–24	UEFA Europa Conference League	KPO	(Israel) Maccabi Haifa	1–1	0–1	1–2
2024–25	UEFA Conference League	2Q	(Faroe Islands) Víkingur	4–1	3–0	7–1
2024–25	UEFA Conference League	3Q	(Denmark) Silkeborg	2–2	3–2 (a.e.t.)	5–4
2024–25	UEFA Conference League	PO	(Serbia) Partizan	1–0	1–0	2–0
2024–25	UEFA Conference League	League phase	(England) Chelsea	—N/a	2–4	17th
2024–25	UEFA Conference League	League phase	(Norway) Molde	2–1	—N/a	17th
2024–25	UEFA Conference League	League phase	(Cyprus) Omonia	1–0	—N/a	17th
2024–25	UEFA Conference League	League phase	(Switzerland) Lugano	—N/a	0–2	17th
2024–25	UEFA Conference League	League phase	(Serbia) TSC	3–0	—N/a	17th
2024–25	UEFA Conference League	League phase	(Northern Ireland) Larne	—N/a	0–1	17th
2024–25	UEFA Conference League	KPO	(Spain) Real Betis	0–3	1–0	1–3
2026–27	UEFA Conference League	2Q	(Ukraine) LNZ Cherkasy	0–0 (a.e.t.)	0–0	0–0 (4–2 p)
2026–27	UEFA Conference League	3Q	(Sweden) IFK Göteborg	1–1	1–0	2–1
2026–27	UEFA Conference League	PO	(Scotland) Hibernian	0–0	3–2	3–2
2026–27	UEFA Conference League	League phase	(Portugal) Braga	—N/a		TBD
2026–27	UEFA Conference League	League phase	(Serbia) Red Star Belgrade		—N/a	TBD
2026–27	UEFA Conference League	League phase	(Finland) KuPS	—N/a		TBD
2026–27	UEFA Conference League	League phase	(Norway) Brann		—N/a	TBD
2026–27	UEFA Conference League	League phase	(Denmark) AGF		—N/a	TBD
2026–27	UEFA Conference League	League phase	(Switzerland) Thun	—N/a		TBD

== Players ==
=== Current squad ===
As of 4 September 2026

Note: Flags indicate national team as defined under FIFA eligibility rules; some limited exceptions apply. Players may hold more than one non-FIFA nationality.

No.	Pos.	Nation	Player
3	DF	EST	Maksim Paskotši
5	DF	SEN	El Bachir Ngom
7	FW	COD	Michel-Ange Balikwisha (on loan from Celtic)
8	MF	SVK	László Bénes
10	MF	NED	Aimé Omgba
11	FW	SWE	Momodou Sonko
14	FW	ENG	Kyrell Wilson
16	DF	ENG	Christian Burgess
17	MF	BEL	Mathias Delorge
18	MF	BEL	Matisse Samoise
20	DF	POR	Tiago Araújo
21	FW	ENG	Max Dean
22	MF	POR	Leonardo Lopes
23	GK	BEL	Tom Vandenberghe
27	MF	BEL	Tibe De Vlieger
28	MF	BEL	Mohammed El Âdfaoui
29	DF	BEL	Lars Cooman

No.	Pos.	Nation	Player
30	GK	BEL	Kjell Peersman
31	GK	BEL	Bas Evers
33	GK	BEL	Davy Roef (captain)
35	DF	BEL	Gilles De Meyer
37	MF	ALG	Abdelkahar Kadri
39	DF	BFA	Abdoul Ayinde
44	DF	BEL	Siebe Van der Heyden
45	FW	CIV	Hyllarion Goore
47	FW	PAN	Josué Vergara
51	GK	BEL	Victor De Coninck
56	DF	SEN	Mamadou Diallo
57	DF	BEL	Matties Volckaert
59	FW	SEN	El Hadji Seck
61	FW	NGR	Abubakar Abdullahi
75	FW	SEN	Ibrahima Cissé
—	MF	BEL	Pieter Gerkens

==== Out on loan ====
Note: Flags indicate national team as defined under FIFA eligibility rules; some limited exceptions apply. Players may hold more than one non-FIFA nationality.

No.	Pos.	Nation	Player
—	DF	MAR	Hatim Es-Saoubi (at Volos until 30 June 2027)
62	MF	BEL	Wout Asselman (at Cambuur until 30 June 2027)

No.	Pos.	Nation	Player
—	FW	BEL	Dante Vanzeir (at Cercle Brugge until 30 June 2027)

=== Jong KAA Gent ===
As of 25 September 2026

Note: Flags indicate national team as defined under FIFA eligibility rules; some limited exceptions apply. Players may hold more than one non-FIFA nationality.

No.	Pos.	Nation	Player
19	FW	SEN	Moctar Diop
30	GK	BEL	Kjell Peersman
31	GK	BEL	Bas Evers
35	DF	BEL	Gilles De Meyer
39	DF	BFA	Abdoul Ayinde
50	GK	BEL	Noa Vandenabeele
52	GK	MAR	Rayan Yaakoubi
53	GK	BEL	Liam Wauters
55	DF	CIV	Eric Simpore
56	DF	SEN	Mamadou Diallo
58	MF	BEL	Joachim Djamba-Shango
60	FW	BEL	Simon Buggea
61	FW	NGR	Abubakar Abdullahi
63	FW	ENG	Jemiah Umolu
64	MF	MAR	Noah Lagmich
66	DF	BEL	Arthur De Kimpe
67	MF	UKR	Oleksandr Soroka

No.	Pos.	Nation	Player
70	MF	LAT	Mikelis Menniks
71	DF	BEL	Preben Blondeel
72	MF	BEL	Alexandre Chaidron
73	FW	BEL	Ali Donny Sylla
74	DF	BEL	Trey Kongolo
76	DF	HON	Victor Vandenbroucke
77	MF	BEL	Gyano Vanderdonck
78	FW	BEL	David Mukuna-Trouet
79	FW	UKR	Ruslan Vydysh
80	DF	CIV	Abdul Ouedraogo
82	FW	NGR	Daniel James Wisdom (on loan from Spartak Subotica)
85	DF	BEL	Rayan Garcia Belkacem
89	MF	BEL	Loris Pirotte
90	DF	BEL	Michiel Cauwel
95	FW	GHA	Yassin Mohammed (on loan from Malmö U19)
97	FW	BEL	Saïdou Touré

== Technical staff & management ==
Name	Position
Rik De Mil	(Belgium) Head Coach
Timothy Derijck	(Belgium) Assistant Coach
Bart van Tornhout	(Belgium) Goalkeeper Coach
Stijn Matthys	(Belgium) Head of Performance
Frank Wezenbeek	(Belgium) Physiotherapist
Gunther Schepens	(Belgium) Technical coordinator
Sam Baro	(Belgium) Chairman
Arnar Viðarsson	(Iceland) Manager Sports
Sébastien Ronse	(Belgium) Manager Non-sports
Manu Ferrera	(Belgium) Youth director
Gilbert De Groote	(Belgium) Scouting director
Patrick Lips	(Belgium) Commercial director
Luc Adriaensens	(Belgium) Financial Director
Dirk Piens	(Belgium) Organisational Director & Safety Officer
Wim Beelaert	(Belgium) Community manager
Xavier Louwagie	(Belgium) Communication Manager
Marc Van Lysebetten	(Belgium) Press Officer

== Well-known former players of the team ==
Six players of AA Gent held top scorer positions in the UEFA: Maurice Willems (1956–57, 28 games, 35 goals), Ronny Martens (1984–85, 34 games, 23 goals), Erwin Vandenbergh (1990–91, 34 games, 23 goals) and Ole Martin Arst (1999–00, 33 games, 30 goals), Jonathan David (2019–20, 29 games, 18 goals), Hugo Cuypers (2022–23, 39 games, 27 goals).

The Belgian player Roland Storme, central defender of KAA Gent in 1958–59, received the Golden Shoe award. Three other AA Gent players were presented with awards and honors: René Vandereycken got the award for trainer of the year 1991. Frédéric Herpoel was chosen as the best goalkeeper in 2004.

Mbark Boussoufa received multiple awards and honors including: pro-player of the year, best young player and the award of the 12th man, as well as the Ebony Shoe. Another AA Gent player, the Egyptian Ahmed "Mido" Hossam was also presented with the Ebony Shoe 8 years earlier in 2001.

Maurice Willems has scored more goals than any other KAA Gent player, with 185 goals between 1952 and 1962.

Armand Seghers holds the record of the most games played in the first team of KAA Gent: 507 between 1949 and 1960.

Marc Van Der Linden was in the national selection of Belgium for the 1990 World Cup in Italy.

Richard Orlans holds the most selections for the Belgium National Team, more than any other KAA Gent player. He was selected 21 times from 1955 – 1958.

Frédéric Herpoel was four times honoured with the Jean-Claude Bouvy Trophy for "most valuable player of the season" between 2002 – 2005.

Tore André Dahlum was a Norwegian international who played one year for Gent.

Congolese player Leon Mokuna was the first African player in Belgian competition, in 1957. Compatriot Pierre Mwana Kasongo would join the club in 1965 and Kiyika Tokodi would do so in 1980.

== Jean-Claude Bouvy Trophy ==
The Jean-Claude Bouvy Trophy is an award that is annually handed out to the most valuable player of Belgian football club K.A.A. Gent. It was established in 1979 and later named after Jean-Claude Bouvy, a player of Gent who died in a car crash in 1986.

=== Winners ===
Season	Player	Nationality
1978–79	Filip Benoot	Belgium
1979–80	Roger Coenye	Belgium
1980–81	Luc Criel	Belgium
1981–82	André Laurijssen	Belgium
1982–83	Søren Busk	Denmark
1983–84	No trophy awarded	
1984–85	Ronny Martens	Belgium
1985–86	Michel De Wolf	Belgium
1986–87	Michel De Wolf	Belgium
1987–88	André Laurijssen	Belgium
1988–89	Augustine Eguavoen	Nigeria
1989–90	Henri Balenga	(Democratic Republic of the Congo) DR Congo
1990–91	Erwin Vandenbergh	Belgium
1991–92	Eric Viscaal	Netherlands
1992–93	Zsolt Petry	Hungary
1993–94	Tony Herreman	Belgium
1994–95	Suvad Katana	(Bosnia and Herzegovina) Bosnia-Herzegovina
1995–96	Suvad Katana	(Bosnia and Herzegovina) Bosnia-Herzegovina
1996–97	Tony Herreman	Belgium
1997–98	Stijn Vreven	Belgium
1998–99	Pieter Collen	Belgium
1999–00	Eric Joly	France
2000–01	Geri Çipi	Albania
2001–02	Frédéric Herpoel	Belgium
2002–03	Frédéric Herpoel	Belgium
2003–04	Frédéric Herpoel	Belgium
2004–05	Frédéric Herpoel	Belgium
2005–06	Mbark Boussoufa	Morocco
2006–07	Adékambi Olufadé	Togo
2007–08	Bryan Ruiz	Costa Rica
2008–09	Bryan Ruiz	Costa Rica
2009–10	Bojan Jorgačević	Serbia
2010–11	Bojan Jorgačević	Serbia
2011–12	Bernd Thijs	Belgium
2012–13	Hannes Van der Bruggen	Belgium
2013–14	Christophe Lepoint	Belgium
2014–15	Laurent Depoitre	Belgium
2015–16	Nana Asare	Ghana
2016–17	Lovre Kalinić	Croatia
2017–18	Samuel Gigot	France
2018–19	Dylan Bronn	Tunisia
2019–20	Jonathan David	Canada
2020–21	Alessio Castro-Montes	Belgium
2021–22	Tarik Tissoudali	Morocco
2022–23	Hugo Cuypers	Belgium
2022–23	Julien De Sart	Belgium
2024–25	Tsuyoshi Watanabe	Japan

== Coaching history ==
- (Belgium) Hector Priem (1901–09)
- (Belgium) Van Steenkiste (1909–10)
- (Belgium) Horta (1910–12)
- (Belgium) Bunyan (1912–22)
- (Belgium) De Rijke (1922–31)
- (Belgium) Staff Pelsmaecker (1931–41)
- (Hungary) Hugo Fenichel (1941–42)
- (Austria) Willibald Stejskal (1942–43)
- (Belgium) Fons Ferchyér (1943–45)
- (France) Edmond Delfour (1945–51)
- (Austria) Karl Mütsch (1951–52)
- (France) Jules Vandooren (1952–56)
- (France) Edmond Delfour (1956–59)
- (France) Jacques Favre (1959–60)
- (Belgium) Louis Verstraeten (1960–64)
- (Germany) Max Schirschin (1964–65)
- (Belgium) Julien Labeau (1965–66)
- (France) Jules Bigot (1966–67)
- (France) Jules Vandooren (1967–71)
- (Hungary) István Sztani (1971–73)
- (Belgium) Omer Van Boxelaer (1973–74)
- (Belgium) Richard Orlans (1974–76)
- (Belgium) Freddy Qvick (1976)
- (Belgium) Roland Storme (1976 –77)
- (Romania) Norberto Höfling (1977–78)
- (Belgium) Léon Nollet (1978 – September 80)
- (Netherlands) Han Grijzenhout (1980–81)
- (Belgium) Robert Goethals (1981 – January 83)
- (Belgium) Erwin Vanden Daele (1983 – November 83)
- (Netherlands) Han Grijzenhout (1984 – December 86)
- (Netherlands) Gérard Bergholtz (1987)
- (Netherlands) Ab Fafié (1987 – April 88)
- (Belgium) Erwin Vandendaele (1988–89)
- (Belgium) René Vandereycken (31 March 1989 – 28 February 1993)
- (Netherlands) Hans Dorjee (1993)
- (Belgium) Walter Meeuws (1 July 1993 – 30 June 1994)
- (Belgium) Lei Clijsters (1994–96)
- (Netherlands) Johan Boskamp (30 November 1996 – 30 September 1998)
- (Belgium) Herman Vermeulen (interim) (1998 – December 98)
- (Norway) Trond Sollied (1 January 1999 – 30 June 2000)
- (Netherlands) Henk Houwaart (1 July 2000 – 30 September 2000)
- (France) Patrick Rémy (1 July 2000 – 30 June 2002)
- (Belgium) Herman Vermeulen (interim) (2001–02)
- (Netherlands) Jan Olde Riekerink (1 July 2002 – 3 November 2003)
- (Belgium) H. Vermeulen (interim) (5 November 2003 – 17 May 2004)
- (Belgium) Georges Leekens (18 May 2004 – 30 June 2007)
- (Norway) Trond Sollied (1 July 2007 – 30 June 2008)
- (Belgium) Michel Preud'homme (1 July 2008 – 30 June 2010)
- (Belgium) Francky Dury (1 July 2010 – 30 June 2011)
- (Norway) Trond Sollied (1 July 2011 – 23 October 2012)
- (Belgium) Manu Ferrera (interim) (23 October 2012 – 1 November 2012)
- (Belgium) Bob Peeters (1 November 2012 – 3 January 2013)
- (Belgium) Manu Ferrera (interim) (January 2013)
- (Spain) Víctor Fernández (9 January 2013 – 30 September 2013)
- (Romania) Mircea Rednic (1 October 2013 – 9 April 2014)
- (Belgium) Peter Balette (interim) (9 April 2014 – 1 July 2014)
- (Belgium) Hein Vanhaezebrouck (2014 – 27 September 2017)
- (Belgium) Yves Vanderhaeghe (October 2017 – 9 October 2018)
- (Denmark) Jess Thorup (10 October 2018 – 20 August 2020)
- (Romania) László Bölöni (20 August 2020 – 14 September 2020)
- (Belgium) Wim De Decker (14 September 2020 – 4 December 2020)
- (Belgium) Hein Vanhaezebrouck (4 December 2020 – 25 May 2024)
- (Belgium) Wouter Vrancken (4 June 2024 – 21 January 2025)
- (Switzerland) Danijel Milićević (21 January 2025 – 27 May 2025)
- (Croatia) Ivan Leko (4 June 2025 – 8 December 2025)
- (Belgium) Rik De Mil (10 December 2025 - present)

== Presidents ==
Years	President
1901	Hector Priem
1902–08	Adolphe Dangotte
1908–12	Adolf Gaeremijnck
1912	Hector Priem
1912–13	Jacques Feyerick
1913–29	Pierre Van Bleyenberghe
1929–39	Adrien Stassart
1939–64	Achiel Delongie
1964–67	René Hoste
1967–76	Freddy Mastelinck
1976–85	Albert De Meester
1985–88	Robert Naudts
1988–99	Jean Van Milders
1999–2023	Ivan De Witte
2023–	Sam Baro

== Kit suppliers and shirt sponsors ==
Period	Kit supplier	Shirt sponsor (chest)
1977–1980		Beton-Wegenbouw Gent
1980–1984	Le Coq Sportif	Beton-Wegenbouw Gent
1984–1986	Le Coq Sportif	Bellewaerde Park
1986–1988	Le Coq Sportif	Maes-Pils
1988–1996	adidas	vdk bank
1996–2004	Umbro	vdk bank
2004–2007	Nike	vdk bank
2007–2013	Jako	vdk bank
2013–2015	Masita	vdk bank
2015–2018	Jartazi	vdk bank
2018–2023	Craft	vdk bank
2023–	Craft	Baloise
