= Football at the 2015 African Games – Men's team squads =

== Group A ==
=== Burkina Faso ===
Coach: Issa Balboné

No.	Pos.	Player	Date of birth (age)	Club
1	GK	Hervé Koffi	16 October 1996 (aged 18)	(Burkinabé Football Federation) RC Bobo Dioulasso
2	MF	Adama Barro	3 September 1996 (aged 19)	(Burkinabé Football Federation) RC Bobo Dioulasso
3	MF	Zoko Nikiema	24 July 1993 (aged 22)	(Ivorian Football Federation) Société Omnisports
4	DF	Ismaël Yanogo	12 September 1993 (aged 21)	(Egyptian Football Association) Misr Lel Makkasa
5	DF	Ziem Somda	30 November 1993 (aged 21)	(Burkinabé Football Federation) USFA
6	DF	Rachid Coulibaly	28 February 1993 (aged 22)	(Burkinabé Football Federation) Rail Club
7	FW	Romaric Pitroïpa	31 December 1994 (aged 20)	(Burkinabé Football Federation) Étoile Filante
8	MF	Assane Guimbou	9 September 1993 (aged 21)	(Burkinabé Football Federation) Étoile Filante
9	FW	Omar Kaboré	30 August 1993 (aged 22)	(Gabonese Football Federation) Missile FC
10	MF	Sydney Sylla	27 December 1996 (aged 18)	(Burkinabé Football Federation) USFA
11	DF	Fousseni Béao	31 December 1993 (aged 21)	(Burkinabé Football Federation) RC Bobo Dioulasso
12	FW	Francis Kaboré	3 June 1994 (aged 21)	(Burkinabé Football Federation) Étoile Filante
13	FW	Ilasse Sawadogo	26 February 1996 (aged 19)	(Burkinabé Football Federation) Kiko FC
14	MF	Zerbo Zakaria	29 August 1994 (aged 21)	(Burkinabé Football Federation) US Ouagadougou
15	FW	Ousmane Nana	14 April 1994 (aged 21)	(Burkinabé Football Federation) ASFA Yennenga
16	GK	Mohamed Bailou	21 May 1995 (aged 20)	(Burkinabé Football Federation) RC Bobo Dioulasso
17	FW	Zakaria Sanogo	11 December 1996 (aged 18)	(French Football Federation) RC Strasbourg
18	MF	Patrice Zoungrana	2 December 1994 (aged 20)	(Croatian Football Federation) NK Neretvanac
19	MF	Arba Dicko	7 January 1994 (aged 21)	(Burkinabé Football Federation) RC Bobo Dioulasso
20	DF	Emmanuel Gora	28 December 1996 (aged 18)	(Burkinabé Football Federation) USFA

=== Congo ===
Coach: (France) Claude Le Roy

The final squad was announced on 31 August 2015.

No.	Pos.	Player	Date of birth (age)	Club
1	GK	Christoffer Mafoumbi	3 March 1994 (aged 21)	(French Football Federation) Le Pontet
2	DF	Varel Rozan	9 September 1994 (aged 20)	(Royal Moroccan Football Federation) KAC Kénitra
3	DF	Romaric Etou	25 January 1995 (aged 20)	(Israel Football Association) Beitar Tel Aviv
4	DF	Atoni Mavoungou	22 December 1996 (aged 18)	(Congolese Football Federation) Diables Noirs
5	DF	Carof Bakoua	9 September 1993 (aged 21)	(Congolese Football Federation) AC Léopards
6	MF	Durel Avounou	25 September 1997 (aged 17)	(Congolese Football Federation) CESD La Djiri
7	MF	Bersyl Obassi	29 March 1996 (aged 19)	(Congolese Football Federation) Étoile du Congo
8	MF	Merveil Ndockyt	20 July 1998 (aged 17)	(Congolese Football Federation) CARA Brazzaville
9	FW	Silvère Ganvoula	29 June 1996 (aged 19)	(Turkish Football Federation) Elazığspor
10	FW	Moïse Nkounkou	2 August 1996 (aged 19)	(Congolese Football Federation) Étoile du Congo
11	FW	Mavis Tchibota	7 May 1996 (aged 19)	(Israel Football Association) Hapoel Kfar Saba
12	FW	Junior Makiesse	12 June 1993 (aged 22)	(Congolese Football Federation) AC Léopards
13	FW	Yhoan Andzouana	13 December 1996 (aged 18)	(French Football Federation) AS Monaco
14	FW	Kader Bidimbou	20 February 1996 (aged 19)	(Congolese Football Federation) AC Léopards
15	MF	Julsy Boukama-Kaya	5 February 1993 (aged 22)	(Angolan Football Federation) Recreativo do Libolo
16	GK	Pavelh Ndzila	12 January 1995 (aged 20)	(Congolese Football Federation) Étoile du Congo
17	DF	Sagesse Babélé	13 February 1993 (aged 22)	(Congolese Football Federation) AC Léopards
18	DF	Ravy Tsouka	23 December 1994 (aged 20)	(Italian Football Federation) Crotone
19	MF	Noël Mokouka	25 December 1994 (aged 20)	(Congolese Football Federation) AS Cheminots
20	MF	Franck Nioby	24 June 1996 (aged 19)	(French Football Federation) Saint-Quentin

=== Sudan ===
Coach: Hamdan Hemed

No.	Pos.	Player	Date of birth (age)	Club
1	GK	Ahmed Abd Elazim	8 August 1996 (aged 19)	(Sudan Football Association) El-Hilal SC El-Obeid
2	DF	Khalid Abdelgadir	25 September 1998 (aged 16)	(Sudan Football Association) Al Rabita Kosti
3	MF	Abuaagla Abdalla	11 March 1993 (aged 22)	(Sudan Football Association) Ombada SC
4	DF	Jalal El Sayed	1 January 1996 (aged 19)	(Sudan Football Association) El-Hilal SC El-Obeid
5	DF	Hamza Dawod	28 June 1998 (aged 17)	(Sudan Football Association) Al Khartoum SC
6	MF	Ibrahim Gaafar	4 December 1993 (aged 21)	(Sudan Football Association) Al-Merreikh SC (Al-Fasher)
7	FW	Ahmed Nasr Eldin	6 August 1994 (aged 21)	(Sudan Football Association) Al-Ahly Shendi
8	MF	Ahmed Jalal	1 January 1995 (aged 20)	(Sudan Football Association) Al Rabita Kosti
9	FW	Walaa Eldin Musa	1 January 2000 (aged 15)	(Sudan Football Association) Al-Ahli SC (Wad Madani)
10	FW	Husam Nasr Eldin	14 February 1993 (aged 22)	(Sudan Football Association) Al Khartoum SC
11	FW	Mahir Osman	21 June 1996 (aged 19)	(Sudan Football Association) Ombada SC
12	DF	Mahmoud Mohamed	1 January 1993 (aged 22)	(Sudan Football Association) Ombada SC
13	DF	Mazin Shamselfalah	1 January 1997 (aged 18)	(Sudan Football Association) Al-Merrikh SC
14	MF	Mohamed Mokhtar	8 March 1996 (aged 19)	(Sudan Football Association) Al-Hilal Club
15	DF	El Shareef Ishag	4 August 1995 (aged 20)	(Sudan Football Association) Al Mirghani ESC
16	GK	Zakaria Haydar	1 January 1995 (aged 20)	(Sudan Football Association) Al-Nesoor SC
17	FW	Waleed Al-Shoala	11 November 1998 (aged 16)	(Sudan Football Association) Al-Hilal Club
18	MF	Sharaf Eldin Shaiboub	7 June 1994 (aged 21)	(Sudan Football Association) Al-Merrikh SC
19	GK	Mohamed Mustafa	19 February 1996 (aged 19)	(Sudan Football Association) Al-Merrikh SC
20	MF	Ibrahim Mahjoub	7 December 1993 (aged 21)	(Sudan Football Association) Al-Merrikh SC

=== Zimbabwe ===
Coach: Nation Dube

The final squad was announced on 2 September 2015.

No.	Pos.	Player	Date of birth (age)	Club
1	GK	Bernard Donovan	12 July 1995 (aged 20)	(Zimbabwe Football Association) How Mine
2	DF	Jimmy Konono	13 December 1995 (aged 19)	(Zimbabwe Football Association) Wha Wha
3	DF	Pritchard Mpelele	16 June 1995 (aged 20)	(Zimbabwe Football Association) Mwange
4	DF	Lawrence Mhlanga	20 December 1993 (aged 21)	(Zimbabwe Football Association) Chicken Inn
5	DF	Munyaradzi Diro	29 April 1994 (aged 21)	(Zimbabwe Football Association) Harare City
6	DF	Blessing Moyo	4 April 1995 (aged 20)	(Zimbabwe Football Association) Dynamos
7	DF	Praise Tonha	29 March 1995 (aged 20)	(Zimbabwe Football Association) Triangle United
8	DF	Tichaona Chipunza	8 June 1994 (aged 21)	(Zimbabwe Football Association) Triangle United
9	FW	Emmanuel Takawira	12 July 1997 (aged 18)	(Zimbabwe Football Association) Harare City
10	FW	Knox Mutizwa	12 October 1993 (aged 21)	(Zimbabwe Football Association) Highlanders
11	DF	Teenage Hadebe	17 September 1995 (aged 19)	(Zimbabwe Football Association) Highlanders
13	DF	Farai Madhanaga	14 February 1995 (aged 20)	(Zimbabwe Football Association) Flame
14	FW	Abel Gwatidzo	16 October 1994 (aged 20)	(Zimbabwe Football Association) Gunners
15	MF	Nqobizitha Masuku	7 June 1993 (aged 22)	(Zimbabwe Football Association) Highlanders
16	GK	Takabva Mawaya	2 February 1993 (aged 22)	(Zimbabwe Football Association) Hwang
17	MF	Malvin Gaki	17 July 1994 (aged 21)	(Zimbabwe Football Association) Triangle United
18	MF	Tinovimba Muskwe	1 January 1994 (aged 21)	(Zimbabwe Football Association) CAPS United
19	FW	Tafadzwa Kutinyu	22 December 1994 (aged 20)	(Zimbabwe Football Association) Chicken Inn
20	GK	Tatenda Munditi	25 November 1997 (aged 17)	(Zimbabwe Football Association) Harare City

== Group B ==
=== Ghana ===
Coach: Malik Jabir

The final squad was announced on 28 August 2015.

No.	Pos.	Player	Date of birth (age)	Club
1	GK	Eric Ofori Antwi	30 October 1994 (aged 20)	(Ghana Football Association) Asante Kotoko
2	FW	Samuel Tetteh	28 July 1996 (aged 19)	(Ghana Football Association) West African Football Academy
3	DF	Richard Osei Agyemang	6 April 1995 (aged 20)	(Ghana Football Association) Berekum Chelsea
4	DF	Emmanuel Nti Mensah	8 June 1993 (aged 22)	(Ghana Football Association) New Edubiase United
5	MF	Sadiq Alhassan	15 August 1996 (aged 19)	(Ghana Football Association) Wa All Stars
6	DF	Baba Mensah	20 August 1994 (aged 21)	(Ghana Football Association) Inter Allies
7	FW	Richard Gadze	23 August 1994 (aged 21)	(Ghana Football Association) Ebusua Dwarfs
8	MF	Abdul Latif Anabila	15 April 1997 (aged 18)	(Ghana Football Association) New Edubiase United
9	FW	Dauda Mohammed	20 February 1998 (aged 17)	(Ghana Football Association) Asante Kotoko
10	MF	Kennedy Ashia	13 December 1994 (aged 20)	(Ghana Football Association) Liberty Professionals
11	FW	Bright Adjei	27 April 1994 (aged 21)	(Ghana Football Association) Tema Youth
12	MF	Tamimu Montari	16 December 1995 (aged 19)	(Ghana Football Association) Liberty Professionals
13	DF	Amos Acheampong	12 October 1993 (aged 21)	(Ghana Football Association) Utrecht
14	DF	Lawrence Lartey	23 March 1993 (aged 22)	(Ghana Football Association) Ashanti Gold
15	DF	Jeremiah Arkorful	31 May 1994 (aged 21)	(Ghana Football Association) Tema Youth
16	GK	Richard Ofori Antwi	1 November 1993 (aged 21)	(Ghana Football Association) Wa All Stars
17	FW	Kwame Boahene	6 July 1993 (aged 22)	(Ghana Football Association) Medeama
18	DF	Patrick Asmah	25 January 1996 (aged 19)	(Ghana Football Association) BA United
19	MF	Idan Ocran	27 December 1996 (aged 18)	(Ghana Football Association) Medeama
20	GK	Felix Annan	22 November 1994 (aged 20)	(Ghana Football Association) West African Football Academy

=== Nigeria ===
Coach: Samson Siasia

The 31-man provisional squad was announced on 13 August 2015.

No.	Pos.	Player	Date of birth (age)	Club
1	GK	Emmanuel Daniel	17 December 1993 (aged 21)	(Nigeria Football Federation) Enugu Rangers
2	DF	Erhun Obanor	5 September 1995 (aged 20)	(Nigeria Football Federation) Abia Warriors
3	MF	Shehu Abdullahi	12 March 1993 (aged 22)	(Portuguese Football Federation) União Madeira
4	DF	Semiu Liadi	15 February 1993 (aged 22)	(Nigeria Football Federation) Warri Wolves
5	DF	Sodiq Atanda	26 August 1993 (aged 22)	(Albanian Football Federation) KF Apolonia
6	DF	Segun Oduduwa	10 October 1995 (aged 19)	(Nigeria Football Federation) Nath Boys
7	MF	Kingsley Sokari	30 May 1995 (aged 20)	(Nigeria Football Federation) Enyimba
8	FW	Oghenekaro Etebo	9 November 1995 (aged 19)	(Nigeria Football Federation) Warri Wolves
9	FW	Etor Daniel	5 May 1993 (aged 22)	(Nigeria Football Federation) Enyimba
10	FW	Christian Pyagbara	13 March 1996 (aged 19)	(Nigeria Football Federation) Rivers United
11	FW	Junior Ajayi	29 January 1996 (aged 19)	(Nigeria Football Federation) 36 Lion
12	FW	Augustine Oladapo	27 July 1995 (aged 20)	(Nigeria Football Federation) Ifeanyi Ubah
13	MF	Saviour Godwin	22 August 1996 (aged 19)	(Nigeria Football Federation) Plateau United
14	MF	Azubuike Okechukwu	19 April 1997 (aged 18)	(Turkish Football Federation) Yeni Malatyaspor
15	DF	Ndifreke Udo	15 August 1998 (aged 17)	(Nigeria Football Federation) Abia Warriors
16	GK	Yusuf Mohammed	22 December 1996 (aged 18)	(Nigeria Football Federation) Kano Pillars
17	FW	Aminu Umar	6 March 1995 (aged 20)	(Turkish Football Federation) Osmanlıspor
18	DF	Seth Sincere	28 April 1998 (aged 17)	(Nigeria Football Federation) Supreme Court
19	DF	Abdullahi Mustapha	18 January 1996 (aged 19)	(Nigeria Football Federation) Spotlights
20	GK	Lucky Jimoh	7 December 1995 (aged 19)	(Nigeria Football Federation) 36 Lion

=== Senegal ===
Coach: Serigne Saliou Dia

No.	Pos.	Player	Date of birth (age)	Club
1	GK	Pape Seydou N'Diaye	11 February 1993 (aged 22)	(Senegalese Football Federation) Niarry Tally
2	MF	Ousseynou Thioune	16 November 1993 (aged 21)	(Senegalese Football Federation) Diambars
3	MF	Nestor Mendy	26 February 1995 (aged 20)	(Senegalese Football Federation) AS Douanes
4	DF	Ibrahima Diédhiou	13 October 1994 (aged 20)	(Royal Belgian Football Association) Eupen
5	DF	Daouda Diop	10 January 1993 (aged 22)	(Senegalese Football Federation) Stade Mbour
6	DF	Arial Mendy	7 November 1994 (aged 20)	(Senegalese Football Federation) Diambars
7	MF	Sylvain Badji	28 June 1994 (aged 21)	(Senegalese Football Federation) AS Douanes
8	FW	Samba Ndiaye	12 January 1994 (aged 21)	(Royal Belgian Football Association) Eupen
9	FW	Ibrahima Keïta	16 June 1994 (aged 21)	(Senegalese Football Federation) AS Douanes
10	MF	Abdoulaye Ba	12 October 1993 (aged 21)	(Senegalese Football Federation) Niarry Tally
11	FW	Dominique Mendy	10 January 1994 (aged 21)	(Senegalese Football Federation) Casa Sports
12	MF	Roger Gomis	20 March 1995 (aged 20)	(Senegalese Football Federation) US Gorée
13	MF	Boubacar Cissokho	6 December 1994 (aged 20)	(Senegalese Football Federation) SUNEOR
14	DF	Adama Mbengue	1 December 1993 (aged 21)	(Senegalese Football Federation) Galaxy Foot
15	DF	Elhadji Pape Diaw	31 December 1994 (aged 20)	(Senegalese Football Federation) Port Autonome
16	GK	Pape Abdoulaye Dieng	10 November 1994 (aged 20)	(Senegalese Football Federation) AS Dakar Sacré-Cœur
17	MF	Mouhamed Guèye	5 December 1993 (aged 21)	(Norwegian Football Federation) Fredrikstad
18	FW	Moussa Seydi	21 August 1996 (aged 19)	(French Football Federation) FC Metz
19	DF	Moussa Wagué	4 October 1998 (aged 16)	(Senegalese Football Federation) Excellence Foot
20	FW	Cheikhou Dieng	23 November 1993 (aged 21)	(Norwegian Football Federation) Sandefjord
