= 2015 U-23 Africa Cup of Nations squads =

The 2015 Africa U-23 Cup of Nations is an international football tournament that is to be held in Senegal from 28 November to 12 December 2015.

The 8 under-23 national teams involved in the tournament were required to register a squad of 21 players. Only players in these squads were eligible to take part in the tournament. All players must be born on or after 1 January 1993.

Players marked in boldface have been capped at full international level.

== Group A ==
=== Senegal ===
Head coach: Serigne Saliou Dia

| No. | Pos. | Player | Date of birth (age) | Club |
|---|---|---|---|---|
| 1 | GK | **Pape Ndiaye** | 11 February 1993 (aged 22) | (Senegalese Football Federation) ASC Niarry Tally |
| 2 | MF | **Ousseynou Thioune** | 16 November 1993 (aged 22) | (Senegalese Football Federation) Diambars FC |
| 3 | MF | **Nestor Mendy** | 26 February 1995 (aged 20) | (Senegalese Football Federation) Diambars FC |
| 4 | DF | **Ibrahima Diedhiou** | 13 October 1994 (aged 21) | (Royal Belgian Football Association) Eupen |
| 5 | MF | **Boubacar Cissokho** | 6 December 1994 (aged 20) | (Senegalese Football Federation) ASC SUNEOR |
| 6 | MF | **Sidy Sarr** | 5 June 1996 (aged 19) | (Royal Belgian Football Association) Kortrijk |
| 7 | FW | Sylvain Badji | 28 June 1994 (aged 21) | (Senegalese Football Federation) AS Douanes |
| 8 | MF | Samba Ndiaye | 12 January 1994 (aged 21) | (Royal Belgian Football Association) Eupen |
| 9 | FW | Ibrahima Keita | 16 June 1994 (aged 21) | (Senegalese Football Federation) AS Douanes |
| 10 | MF | **Abdoulaye Ba** | 12 October 1993 (aged 22) | (Senegalese Football Federation) ASC Niarry Tally |
| 11 | FW | **Ismaïla Sarr** | 25 February 1998 (aged 17) | (Senegalese Football Federation) Génération Foot |
| 12 | FW | **Mouhamadou Diallo** | 18 June 1995 (aged 20) | (French Football Federation) Metz |
| 13 | DF | Alhassane Sylla | 24 August 1995 (aged 20) | (Senegalese Football Federation) Diambars FC |
| 14 | DF | **Adama Mbengue** | 1 December 1993 (aged 21) | (Senegalese Football Federation) Diambars FC |
| 15 | DF | **Elhadji Pape Diaw** | 31 December 1994 (aged 20) | (Royal Belgian Football Association) ASV Geel |
| 16 | GK | Pape Dieng | 10 November 1994 (aged 21) | (Senegalese Football Federation) AS Dakar Sacré-Coeur |
| 17 | DF | Modou Diagne | 3 January 1994 (aged 21) | (French Football Federation) Nancy |
| 18 | FW | Moussa Seydi | 21 August 1996 (aged 19) | (French Football Federation) Metz |
| 19 | DF | **Moussa Wagué** | 4 October 1998 (aged 17) | (Senegalese Football Federation) Aspire Academy |
| 20 | FW | Cheikhou Dieng | 23 November 1993 (aged 22) | (Norwegian Football Federation) Sandefjord |
| 21 | GK | Mouhamed Mbaye | 13 October 1997 (aged 18) | (Senegalese Football Federation) Aspire Academy |

=== South Africa ===
Head coach: Owen Da Gama

| No. | Pos. | Player | Date of birth (age) | Club |
|---|---|---|---|---|
| 1 | GK | **Jody February** | 12 May 1996 (aged 19) | (South African Football Association) Ajax Cape Town |
| 2 | DF | **Denwin Farmer** | 19 May 1996 (aged 19) | (South African Football Association) Supersport United |
| 3 | DF | **Tshepo Rikhotso** | 26 February 1993 (aged 22) | (South African Football Association) Bloemfontein Celtic |
| 4 | DF | Zitha Macheke | 4 January 1994 (aged 21) | (South African Football Association) Chippa United |
| 5 | DF | **Rivaldo Coetzee** | 16 October 1996 (aged 19) | (South African Football Association) Ajax Cape Town |
| 6 | DF | **Kwanda Mngonyama** | 25 September 1993 (aged 22) | (South African Football Association) Maritzburg |
| 7 | MF | **Riyaad Norodien** | 26 March 1995 (aged 20) | (South African Football Association) Ajax Cape Town |
| 8 | MF | **Abbubaker Mobara** | 18 February 1994 (aged 21) | (South African Football Association) Ajax Cape Town |
| 9 | FW | Sibusiso Sibeko | 24 March 1995 (aged 20) | (South African Football Association) Golden Arrows |
| 10 | MF | **Menzi Masuku** | 15 April 1993 (aged 22) | (South African Football Association) Orlando Pirates |
| 11 | MF | **Keagan Dolly** | 22 January 1993 (aged 22) | (South African Football Association) Mamelodi Sundowns |
| 12 | MF | Phumlani Ntshangase | 24 December 1994 (aged 20) | (South African Football Association) Bidvest Wits |
| 13 | FW | **Phakamani Mahlambi** | 12 September 1997 (aged 18) | (South African Football Association) Bidvest Wits |
| 14 | MF | **Gift Motupa** | 23 September 1994 (aged 21) | (South African Football Association) Orlando Pirates |
| 15 | MF | **Paseka Mako** | 1 April 1994 (aged 21) | (South African Football Association) Cape Town All Stars |
| 16 | GK | **Ricardo Goss** | 2 April 1994 (aged 21) | (South African Football Association) Golden Arrows |
| 17 | FW | **Siphelele Ntshangase** | 11 May 1993 (aged 22) | (South African Football Association) Black Leopards |
| 18 | MF | **Deolin Mekoa** | 10 August 1993 (aged 22) | (South African Football Association) Maritzburg |
| 19 | DF | Tebogo Moerane | 7 April 1995 (aged 20) | (South African Football Association) Bidvest Wits |
| 20 | FW | **Dumisani Zuma** | 22 May 1995 (aged 20) | (South African Football Association) Bloemfontein Celtic |
| 21 | GK | Kyle Peters | 14 April 1993 (aged 22) | (South African Football Association) Cape Town All Stars |

=== Tunisia ===
Head coach: Maher Kanzari

| No. | Pos. | Player | Date of birth (age) | Club |
|---|---|---|---|---|
| 1 | GK | Saifeddine Charfi | 28 March 1995 (aged 20) | (Tunisian Football Federation) Club Africain |
| 2 | DF | **Wajdi Kechrida** | 5 November 1995 (aged 20) | (Tunisian Football Federation) Étoile du Sahel |
| 3 | DF | **Slimane Kchok** | 7 May 1994 (aged 21) | (Tunisian Football Federation) CA Bizertin |
| 4 | DF | Seddik Mejri | 31 May 1994 (aged 21) | (Tunisian Football Federation) CA Bizertin |
| 5 | DF | Ali Machani | 12 July 1993 (aged 22) | (Tunisian Football Federation) Espérance |
| 6 | MF | **Yassine Meriah** | 2 July 1993 (aged 22) | (Tunisian Football Federation) CS Sfaxien |
| 7 | FW | Chedly Ghrab | 15 May 1993 (aged 22) | (Tunisian Football Federation) CA Bizertin |
| 8 | MF | **Ghailene Chaalali** | 28 February 1994 (aged 21) | (Tunisian Football Federation) Espérance |
| 9 | FW | **Seifeddine Jaziri** | 11 February 1993 (aged 22) | (Tunisian Football Federation) Club Africain |
| 10 | MF | Ilyes Jelassi | 7 February 1994 (aged 21) | (Tunisian Football Federation) Espérance |
| 11 | FW | **Edem Rjaibi** | 5 April 1994 (aged 21) | (Tunisian Football Federation) Espérance |
| 12 | MF | **Ahmed Khalil** | 21 December 1994 (aged 20) | (Tunisian Football Federation) Club Africain |
| 13 | DF | **Ali Abdi** | 20 December 1993 (aged 21) | (Tunisian Football Federation) Espérance |
| 14 | FW | Haythem Jouini | 7 May 1993 (aged 22) | (Tunisian Football Federation) Espérance |
| 15 | MF | Zoubayer Darraji | 14 May 1993 (aged 22) | (Tunisian Football Federation) CA Bizertin |
| 16 | GK | Sabri Ben Hsan | 13 June 1996 (aged 19) | (Tunisian Football Federation) CS Sfaxien |
| 17 | MF | **Nader Ghandri** | 18 February 1995 (aged 20) | (Tunisian Football Federation) Club Africain |
| 18 | FW | **Saad Bguir** | 22 March 1994 (aged 21) | (Tunisian Football Federation) Espérance |
| 19 | DF | Wissem Bousnina | 6 April 1994 (aged 21) | (Tunisian Football Federation) CS Hammam-Lif |
| 20 | FW | Khaldoun Mansour | 23 December 1993 (aged 21) | (Tunisian Football Federation) EO Sidi Bouzid |
| 21 | GK | Wassim Karoui | 7 January 1997 (aged 18) | (Tunisian Football Federation) Espérance |

=== Zambia ===
Head coach: Fighton Simukonda

| No. | Pos. | Player | Date of birth (age) | Club |
|---|---|---|---|---|
| 1 | GK | Kenny Mumba | 11 October 1993 (aged 22) | (Football Association of Zambia) Red Arrows |
| 2 | MF | **Patrick Ngoma** | 21 May 1997 (aged 18) | (Football Association of Zambia) Red Arrows |
| 3 | DF | **Benedict Chepeshi** | 10 June 1996 (aged 19) | (Football Association of Zambia) Red Arrows |
| 4 | DF | Boyd Mkandawire | 11 April 1997 (aged 18) | (Football Association of Zambia) NAPSA Stars |
| 5 | DF | Solomon Sakala | 28 April 1997 (aged 18) | (Football Association of Zambia) Kabwe Warriors |
| 6 | FW | **Friday Samu** | 9 May 1995 (aged 20) | (Football Association of Zambia) Green Buffaloes |
| 7 | MF | **Salulani Phiri** | 10 April 1994 (aged 21) | (Football Association of Zambia) Zanaco |
| 8 | MF | **John Ching'andu** | 10 December 1993 (aged 21) | (Football Association of Zambia) ZESCO United |
| 9 | FW | **Ronald Kampamba** | 26 May 1994 (aged 21) | (Egyptian Football Association) ENPPI |
| 10 | FW | **Spencer Sautu** | 10 March 1996 (aged 19) | (Football Association of Zambia) Red Arrows |
| 11 | MF | **Lubambo Musonda** | 1 March 1995 (aged 20) | (Football Federation of Armenia) Ulisses |
| 12 | DF | **Benson Sakala** | 12 September 1996 (aged 19) | (Football Association of Zambia) Red Arrows |
| 13 | DF | Kapota Kavawe | 27 December 1996 (aged 18) | (Football Association of Zambia) Nkana |
| 14 | MF | **Jackson Chirwa** | 11 June 1995 (aged 20) | (Football Association of Zambia) Green Buffaloes |
| 15 | MF | **Paul Katema** | 19 September 1997 (aged 18) | (Football Association of Zambia) Red Arrows |
| 16 | GK | **Toaster Nsabata** | 24 November 1993 (aged 22) | (Football Association of Zambia) Zanaco |
| 17 | FW | **Conlyde Luchanga** | 11 March 1997 (aged 18) | (Football Association of Zambia) Lusaka Dynamos |
| 18 | DF | **Billy Mutale** | 21 June 1993 (aged 22) | (Football Association of Zambia) Power Dynamos |
| 19 | FW | Aubrey Chirwa | 12 February 1994 (aged 21) | (Zimbabwe Football Association) FC Platinum |
| 20 | MF | **Taonga Bwembya** | 11 June 1995 (aged 20) | (Football Association of Zambia) Mufulira Wanderers |
| 21 | GK | Tresford Lawrence Mulenga | 21 August 1998 (aged 17) | (Football Association of Zambia) Kabwe Warriors |

== Group B ==
=== Algeria ===
Head coach: (Switzerland) Pierre-André Schürmann

| No. | Pos. | Player | Date of birth (age) | Club |
|---|---|---|---|---|
| 1 | GK | **Abdelkader Salhi** | 19 March 1993 (aged 22) | (Algerian Football Federation) ASO Chlef |
| 2 | DF | **Réda Halaïmia** | 28 August 1996 (aged 19) | (Algerian Football Federation) MC Oran |
| 3 | DF | **Ayoub Abdellaoui** | 16 February 1993 (aged 22) | (Algerian Football Federation) USM Alger |
| 4 | DF | Nour El Islam Salah | 17 March 1993 (aged 22) | (Algerian Football Federation) ASO Chlef |
| 5 | MF | Ryad Kenniche | 30 April 1993 (aged 22) | (Algerian Football Federation) ES Sétif |
| 6 | MF | **Mohamed Benkhemassa** | 28 June 1993 (aged 22) | (Algerian Football Federation) USM Alger |
| 7 | MF | **Zinedine Ferhat** | 1 March 1993 (aged 22) | (Algerian Football Federation) USM Alger |
| 8 | MF | **Oussama Chita** | 31 October 1996 (aged 19) | (Algerian Football Federation) MC Alger |
| 9 | FW | **Oussama Darfalou** | 29 September 1993 (aged 22) | (Algerian Football Federation) USM Alger |
| 10 | FW | **Abderrahmane Meziane** | 7 March 1994 (aged 21) | (Algerian Football Federation) RC Arbaâ |
| 11 | FW | Zakaria Haddouche | 19 August 1993 (aged 22) | (Algerian Football Federation) ES Sétif |
| 12 | DF | **Raouf Benguit** | 5 April 1996 (aged 19) | (Algerian Football Federation) Paradou AC |
| 13 | DF | Miloud Rebiai | 12 December 1993 (aged 21) | (Algerian Football Federation) ES Sétif |
| 14 | FW | Khalil Semahi | 22 January 1995 (aged 20) | (Algerian Football Federation) ASO Chlef |
| 15 | DF | **Houari Ferhani** | 11 February 1993 (aged 22) | (Algerian Football Federation) RC Arbaâ |
| 16 | GK | Farid Chaâl | 3 July 1994 (aged 21) | (Algerian Football Federation) USM El Harrach |
| 17 | DF | **Redouane Cherifi** | 22 February 1993 (aged 22) | (Algerian Football Federation) USM Bel-Abbès |
| 18 | FW | Abdelhakim Amokrane | 10 May 1994 (aged 21) | (Algerian Football Federation) DRB Tadjenanet |
| 19 | MF | Ahmed Gagaâ | 15 January 1994 (aged 21) | (Algerian Football Federation) JS Kabylie |
| 20 | MF | Zakaria Draoui | 20 February 1994 (aged 21) | (Algerian Football Federation) CR Belouizdad |
| 21 | GK | Oussama Methazem | 16 December 1993 (aged 21) | (Algerian Football Federation) RC Arbaâ |

=== Egypt ===
Head coach: Hossam El-Badry

| No. | Pos. | Player | Date of birth (age) | Club |
|---|---|---|---|---|
| 1 | GK | **Mossad Awad** | 15 January 1993 (aged 22) | (Egyptian Football Association) Al Ahly |
| 2 | DF | Mohamed Adel Gomaa | 31 March 1993 (aged 22) | (Egyptian Football Association) Zamalek |
| 3 | DF | **Mohamed Hany** | 2 February 1996 (aged 19) | (Egyptian Football Association) Al Ahly |
| 4 | DF | Ragab Abdelnabi | 5 January 1993 (aged 22) | (Egyptian Football Association) Wadi Degla |
| 5 | DF | Yasser Ibrahim | 10 February 1993 (aged 22) | (Egyptian Football Association) Smouha |
| 6 | MF | **Ramy Rabia** | 20 May 1993 (aged 22) | (Egyptian Football Association) Al Ahly |
| 7 | MF | Karim Walid | 8 August 1997 (aged 18) | (Egyptian Football Association) Haras El-Hodood |
| 8 | MF | Mohamed Mohamed | 2 February 1994 (aged 21) | (Egyptian Football Association) Ismaily |
| 9 | FW | **Mohamed Salem** | 1 January 1994 (aged 21) | (Egyptian Football Association) Zamalek |
| 10 | FW | Mahmoud Mansour | 4 January 1993 (aged 22) | (Egyptian Football Association) Ismaily |
| 11 | FW | **Kahraba** | 13 April 1994 (aged 21) | (Egyptian Football Association) Zamalek |
| 12 | MF | Mohamed Saleh | 20 May 1993 (aged 22) | (Egyptian Football Association) Tala'ea El-Gaish |
| 13 | MF | Mohamed Sharf Edin | 15 March 1995 (aged 20) | (Egyptian Football Association) Al Ahly |
| 14 | FW | **Ramadan Sobhy** | 23 January 1997 (aged 18) | (Egyptian Football Association) Al Ahly |
| 15 | FW | **Mostafa Fathi** | 12 May 1994 (aged 21) | (Egyptian Football Association) Zamalek |
| 16 | GK | Hassan Shahin | 10 March 1993 (aged 22) | (Egyptian Football Association) Arab Contractors |
| 17 | DF | Osama Ibrahim | 1 April 1993 (aged 22) | (Egyptian Football Association) ENPPI |
| 18 | FW | Hussein Ragab | 1 January 1993 (aged 22) | (Egyptian Football Association) Misr El-Makasa |
| 19 | DF | Mahmoud Attia | 1 June 1995 (aged 20) | (Egyptian Football Association) Tala'ea El-Gaish |
| 20 | MF | Mamdouh Elsayed | 11 March 1993 (aged 22) | (Egyptian Football Association) Wadi Degla |
| 21 | GK | Mahmoud Aly | 1 November 1993 (aged 22) | (Egyptian Football Association) Misr El-Makasa |

=== Mali ===
Head coach: Cheick Oumar Kone

| No. | Pos. | Player | Date of birth (age) | Club |
|---|---|---|---|---|
| 1 | GK | **Germain Berthe** | 24 October 1993 (aged 22) | (Guinean Football Federation) Horoya AC |
| 2 | FW | Kevin Traoré | 30 August 1996 (aged 19) | (German Football Association) Karlsruher SC |
| 3 | DF | Mamadou Koné | 22 August 1997 (aged 18) | (Malian Football Federation) Onze Créateurs |
| 4 | MF | Idrissa Sogodogo | 1 January 1995 (aged 20) | (Malian Football Federation) Lafia Club Bamako |
| 5 | FW | Nouhoun Samassekou | 25 December 1995 (aged 19) | (Tunisian Football Federation) Espérance |
| 6 | MF | **Boubacar Diarra** | 18 April 1994 (aged 21) | (Congolese Association Football Federation) TP Mazembe |
| 7 | FW | Souleymane Sissoko | 10 April 1996 (aged 19) | (Royal Moroccan Football Federation) Wydad Casablanca |
| 8 | MF | **Diadie Samassekou** | 11 January 1996 (aged 19) | (Austrian Football Association) Red Bull Salzburg |
| 9 | FW | **Adama Niane** | 16 June 1993 (aged 22) | (French Football Federation) Nantes |
| 10 | MF | **Souleymane Diarra** | 30 January 1995 (aged 20) | (Hungarian Football Federation) Újpest |
| 11 | MF | **Adama Traoré** | 5 June 1995 (aged 20) | (Congolese Association Football Federation) TP Mazembe |
| 12 | DF | **Souleymane Coulibaly** | 8 August 1996 (aged 19) | (Tunisian Football Federation) Club Africain |
| 13 | DF | **Aboubacar Doumbia** | 19 April 1995 (aged 20) | (Malian Football Federation) AS Real Bamako |
| 14 | MF | Adama Doumbia | 9 April 1996 (aged 19) | (Malian Football Federation) Jeanne d'Arc |
| 15 | DF | Youssouf Traoré | 22 January 1998 (aged 17) | (Malian Football Federation) Djoliba AC |
| 16 | GK | **Djigui Diarra** | 27 February 1995 (aged 20) | (Malian Football Federation) Stade Malien |
| 17 | FW | **Yves Bissouma** | 30 August 1996 (aged 19) | (Malian Football Federation) AS Real Bamako |
| 18 | MF | Moussa Bagayoko | 18 December 1998 (aged 16) | (Malian Football Federation) AS Black Stars de Badalabougou |
| 19 | FW | **Abdoulaye Diarra** | 28 December 1994 (aged 20) | (Malian Football Federation) Stade Malien |
| 20 | MF | **Aliou Dieng** | 16 October 1997 (aged 18) | (Malian Football Federation) Djoliba AC |
| 21 | GK | N'Tji Samaké | 27 June 1994 (aged 21) | (Malian Football Federation) CS Duguwolofila |

=== Nigeria ===
Head coach: Samson Siasia

| No. | Pos. | Player | Date of birth (age) | Club |
|---|---|---|---|---|
| 1 | GK | Nnamdi Iwu | 29 June 1994 (aged 21) | (Nigeria Football Federation) Heartland |
| 2 | DF | Seth Sincere | 28 April 1998 (aged 17) | (Nigeria Football Federation) Rhapsody FC Abuja |
| 3 | DF | **Ndifreke Udo** | 15 August 1998 (aged 17) | (Nigeria Football Federation) Abia Warriors |
| 4 | MF | Godspower Aniefiok | 27 January 1997 (aged 18) | (Nigeria Football Federation) Kano Pillars |
| 5 | DF | Zaharaddeen Bello | 21 December 1997 (aged 17) | (Nigeria Football Federation) Kano Pillars |
| 6 | DF | Segun Oduduwa | 10 October 1995 (aged 20) | (Nigeria Football Federation) Nathaniels Boys FC |
| 7 | FW | Tiongoli Tonbara | 28 June 1996 (aged 19) | (Nigeria Football Federation) Bayelsa United FC |
| 8 | MF | **Peter Etebo** | 9 November 1995 (aged 20) | (Nigeria Football Federation) Warri Wolves |
| 9 | FW | **Victor Osimhen** | 29 December 1998 (aged 16) | (Nigeria Football Federation) Ultimate Strikers Academy |
| 10 | MF | Mohammed Usman | 2 March 1994 (aged 21) | (Nigeria Football Federation) Taraba |
| 11 | FW | Junior Ajayi | 29 January 1996 (aged 19) | (Tunisian Football Federation) CS Sfaxien |
| 12 | DF | Iroha Chukwuebuka | 13 July 1996 (aged 19) | (Nigeria Football Federation) Diamond FC Umuahia |
| 13 | DF | Olulayo Seun | 8 February 1996 (aged 19) | (Nigeria Football Federation) Sunshine Stars FC |
| 14 | DF | **Azubuike Okechukwu** | 19 April 1997 (aged 18) | (Turkish Football Federation) Yeni Malatyaspor |
| 15 | DF | Chizoba Amaefule | 28 October 1994 (aged 21) | Unattached |
| 16 | GK | Yusuf Mohammed | 22 December 1996 (aged 18) | (Nigeria Football Federation) Kano Pillars |
| 17 | FW | **Stanley Dimgba** | 29 March 1993 (aged 22) | (Nigeria Football Federation) Warri Wolves |
| 18 | FW | **Taiwo Awoniyi** | 12 August 1997 (aged 18) | (German Football Association) Eintracht Frankfurt |
| 19 | FW | **Yaro Bature** | 15 December 1995 (aged 19) | (Nigeria Football Federation) Nasarawa United |
| 20 | FW | Eyo Ebong | 13 May 1995 (aged 20) | (Nigeria Football Federation) Warri Wolves |
| 21 | GK | Emmanuel Daniel | 17 December 1993 (aged 21) | (Nigeria Football Federation) Enugu Rangers |
