= Football at the 2015 African Games – Men's tournament =

2015 African Games men's football tournament
Tournament details
- Host country: Republic of the Congo
- City: Brazzaville
- Dates: 6–18 September
- Teams: 7 (from 1 confederation)
- Venues: 2 (in 1 host city)

Final positions
- Champions: Senegal (1st title)
- Runners-up: Burkina Faso
- Third place: Nigeria
- Fourth place: Congo

Tournament statistics
- Matches played: 13
- Goals scored: 22 (1.69 per match)
- Top scorer(s): (Senegal) Ibrahima Keita (Burkina Faso) Mohamed Sydney Sylla (3 goals each)

The 2015 African Games men's football tournament was the 11th edition of the African Games men's football tournament. The men's football tournament was held in Brazzaville, the Republic of the Congo between 6–18 September 2015 as part of the 2015 African Games. The tournament was age-restricted and open to men's under-23 national teams only.

== Qualification ==
Congo qualified automatically as hosts, while the remaining seven spots were determined by the qualifying rounds, which were organized by the Confederation of African Football (CAF) and took place from February to April 2015.

=== Qualified teams ===
The following eight teams qualified for the final tournament.

Team	Appearance	Previous best performance
Burkina Faso	2nd	Group stage (1973)
Congo (hosts)	4th	Gold medal (1965)
Egypt	8th	Gold medal (1987, 1995)
Ghana	6th	Gold medal (2011)
Nigeria	6th	Gold medal (1973)
Senegal	4th	Fourth place (2011)
Sudan	1st	Debut
Zimbabwe	3rd	Silver medal (1995)

On 26 August 2015, the CAF announced that Egypt had withdrawn from the competition. Burundi, the team eliminated by Egypt in the final round, declined to replace them due to short notice. Therefore, only seven teams competed in the tournament, and Group B, where Egypt were drawn in, was composed of three teams only.

== Venues ==
A new 60,000 capacity stadium, Stade Municipal de Kintélé, was built for the 2015 African Games. The Stade Alphonse Massemba-Débat was also used.

Cities	Venues	Capacity
Brazzaville	Stade Municipal de Kintélé	60,000
Brazzaville	Stade Alphonse Massemba-Débat	33,037

== Group stage ==
The draw was held on 9 July 2015, 11:00 UTC+2, at the CAF Headquarters in Cairo, Egypt. The eight teams were drawn into two groups of four. For the draw, the hosts Congo were seeded in position A1 and the holders Ghana were seeded in position B1. The remaining six teams were drawn from one pot to fill the other positions in the two groups.

The top two teams of each group advanced to the semi-finals.

All times were local, WAT (UTC+1).

=== Group A ===
Pos	Team	Pld	W	D	L	GF	GA	GD	Pts	Qualification
1	Congo (H)	3	2	0	1	4	3	+1	6	Knockout stage
2	Burkina Faso	3	1	1	1	2	2	0	4 (Note: As Burkina Faso and Sudan were tied on points, head-to-head record, total goal difference and total goals scored, a drawing of lots was held on 14 September 2015, 09:00 local time, to determine which team finished as runners-up of Group A, which was won by Burkina Faso.)	Knockout stage
3	Sudan	3	1	1	1	2	2	0	4	
4	Zimbabwe	3	1	0	2	1	2	−1	3	

Source: CAF
(H) Hosts
Notes:
7 September 2015
14:00

Congo	2–1	Sudan
Bidimbou 1', 42'	Report	Yaqoub 17'

Stade Alphonse Massemba-Débat, Brazzaville
Referee: Denis Dembélé (Ivory Coast)
7 September 2015
14:00

Zimbabwe	0–1	Burkina Faso
	Report	Sylla 63'

Stade Municipal de Kintélé, Brazzaville
Referee: Pacifique Ndabihawenimana (Burundi)

10 September 2015
14:00

Sudan	1–0	Zimbabwe
Abuaagla 90'	Report

Stade Alphonse Massemba-Débat, Brazzaville
Referee: Aurélien Juenkou (Cameroon)
10 September 2015
14:00

Burkina Faso	1–2	Congo
Somda 62'	Report	Makiessé 4'; Somda 85' (o.g.)

Stade Municipal de Kintélé, Brazzaville
Referee: Sekou Ahmed Touré (Guinea)

13 September 2015
14:00

Congo	0–1	Zimbabwe
	Report	Kutinyu 71'

Stade Alphonse Massemba-Débat, Brazzaville
Referee: Boubou Traoré (Mali)
13 September 2015
17:00

Sudan	0–0	Burkina Faso
	Report

Stade Alphonse Massemba-Débat, Brazzaville
Referee: Samuel Chirindza (Mozambique)

=== Group B ===
Pos	Team	Pld	W	D	L	GF	GA	GD	Pts	Qualification
1	Nigeria	2	1	1	0	3	1	+2	4	Knockout stage
2	Senegal	2	0	2	0	1	1	0	2	Knockout stage
3	Ghana	2	0	1	1	0	2	−2	1	
4	Egypt	0	0	0	0	0	0	0	0	Withdrew

Source: CAF
6 September 2015
14:00

Ghana	0–0	Senegal
	Report

Stade Alphonse Massemba-Débat, Brazzaville
Referee: Lazard Tsiba (Congo)
6 September 2015
14:00

Egypt	Cancelled	Nigeria
	Report

Stade Municipal de Kintélé, Brazzaville

9 September 2015
14:00

Senegal	Cancelled	Egypt
	Report

Stade Alphonse Massemba-Débat, Brazzaville
9 September 2015
14:00

Nigeria	2–0	Ghana
Ajayi 55'; Sokari 87'	Report

Stade Municipal de Kintélé, Brazzaville
Referee: Noureddine El Jaafari (Morocco)

12 September 2015
14:00

Ghana	Cancelled	Egypt
	Report

Stade Alphonse Massemba-Débat, Brazzaville
12 September 2015
14:00

Senegal	1–1	Nigeria
Keita 82'	Report	Abdullahi 90'

Stade Municipal de Kintélé, Brazzaville
Referee: Mahmoud Ashor (Egypt)

== Knockout stage ==
=== Bracket ===
Semi-finals
15 September – Brazzaville
Congo	1
Senegal	3
15 September – Brazzaville
Nigeria	1
Burkina Faso	3

Gold medal match
17 September – Brazzaville
Senegal	1
Burkina Faso	0
Bronze medal match
18 September – Brazzaville
Congo	0 (3)
Nigeria (p)	0 (5)

=== Semi-finals ===
15 September 2015
15:00

Congo	1–3	Senegal
Ndockyt 54'	Report	Dieng 16'; Keita 36', 82'

Stade Alphonse Massemba-Débat, Brazzaville
Referee: Pacifique Ndabihawenimana (Burundi)

15 September 2015
18:30

Nigeria	1–3	Burkina Faso
Daniel 75'	Report	Sylla 12', 79'; O. Kaboré 64'

Stade Alphonse Massemba-Débat, Brazzaville
Referee: Noureddine El Jaafari (Morocco)

=== Bronze medal match ===
17 September 2015
15:00

Congo	0–0 (a.e.t.)	Nigeria
	Report
Penalties
Bidimbou (penalty scored); Babélé (penalty missed); Ganvoula (penalty scored); Boukama (penalty scored)	3–5	(penalty scored) Daniel; (penalty scored) Atanda; (penalty scored) Sokari; (penalty scored) Obanor; (penalty scored) Pyagbara

Stade Alphonse Massemba-Débat, Brazzaville
Referee: Sekou Ahmed Touré (Guinea)

=== Gold medal match ===
18 September 2015
18:30

Senegal	1–0	Burkina Faso
Seydi 2'	Report

Stade Alphonse Massemba-Débat, Brazzaville
Referee: Aurélien Juenkou (Cameroon)

== Final ranking ==
Pos	Team	Pld	W	D	L	GF	GA	GD	Pts	Final result
1st place, gold medalist(s)	Senegal	4	2	2	0	5	2	+3	8	Gold Medal
2nd place, silver medalist(s)	Burkina Faso	5	2	1	2	5	4	+1	7	Silver Medal
3rd place, bronze medalist(s)	Nigeria	4	1	2	1	4	4	0	5	Bronze Medal
4	Congo (H)	5	2	1	2	5	6	−1	7	Fourth place
5	Sudan	3	1	1	1	2	2	0	4	Eliminated in group stage
6	Zimbabwe	3	1	0	2	1	2	−1	3	Eliminated in group stage
7	Ghana	2	0	1	1	0	2	−2	1	Eliminated in group stage
8	Egypt	0	0	0	0	0	0	0	0	Withdrew

Source: rsssf
(H) Hosts

== Goalscorers ==
3 goals

- (Burkina Faso) Mohamed Sydney Sylla
- (Senegal) Ibrahima Keita

2 goals

- (Republic of the Congo) Kader Bidimbou

1 goal

- (Burkina Faso) Omar Kaboré
- (Burkina Faso) Ziem Somda
- (Republic of the Congo) Junior Makiessé
- (Republic of the Congo) Merveil Ndockyt
- (Nigeria) Mustapha Abdullahi
- (Nigeria) Junior Ajayi
- (Nigeria) Etor Daniel
- (Nigeria) Kingsley Sokari
- (Senegal) Cheikhou Dieng
- (Senegal) Moussa Seydi
- (Sudan) Abuaagla Abdalla
- (Sudan) Walaa Eldin Yaqoub
- (Zimbabwe) Tafadzwa Kutinyu

Own goal

- (Burkina Faso) Ziem Somda (playing against Congo)

== See also ==
- Football at the 2015 African Games – Women's tournament
