= Moshood =

Moshood is a Yoruba given male name and surname, equivalent to the Arabic Masoud.

== People with this given name ==
- Moshood Abiola Polytechnic, tertiary learning institution in Abeokuta, Ogun State, Nigeria
- Moshood Aro (1983), Nigerian politician
- Moshood Kabiru (1998), Nigerian footballer
- Moshood Kashimawo Olawale Abiola (1937–1998), Nigerian Yoruba businessman, publisher, politician and aristocrat of the Egba clan

== People with this surname ==
- Abdul Aziz Moshood (born 1968), retired Nigerian footballer
