= Oghogho =

Oghogho is a female given name from the Urhobo and Edo people of Nigeria. It means “Joy” or “Happiness".

== Person with the name ==
Oghogho Oduokpe (born 25 December 1992) is a Nigerian international footballer who plays as a forward for Maccabi Herzliya.
