= Akande Tope =

Nigerian footballer

Personal information
- Full name: Akande Tope
- Date of birth: 3 December 1997 (age 28)
- Place of birth: Enugu, Nigeria
- Height: 1.90 m (6 ft 3 in)
- Position: Defender

Team information
- Current team: Sunshine Stars
- Number: 31

Youth career
- 2010: Karamone

Senior career*
| Years | Team | Apps | (Gls) |
| 2012–2014 | Prime F.C. | 63 | (7) |
| 2015–2016 | Shooting Stars | 4 | (0) |
| 2016–2018 | Ikorodu United F.C. | 32 | (3) |
| 2018-2022 | Sunshine Stars | 23 | (0) |
| 2022- | Heartland F.C. | 63 | (02) |
- * Club domestic league appearances and goals

Akande Tope (born 3 December 1997) is a Nigeria footballer who currently playing for Sunshine Stars. He has played for Shooting Stars in the Nigeria Premier League. He is from a family of 4 professional football players Akande Niyi Busaga, Akande Tunde plying his trade in Ethiopia Super League and Akande Abiodun Asimiyu the Nigeria youth international. He was signed on loan from Karamone F.C. in 2012 to Prime F.C. in the Nigeria Federation FA Cup and Nigeria National League NNL. He burst into the lime-lights in 2012 when he started showing more than expectations of the technical crew of Prime FC that made them fix him regular to the team. He was part of the team that made Prime FC qualified for the Semi-Final of the Nigeria Football Federation FA Cup which he scored a fantastic volley goal. He becameone of the key player of Prime FC in 2012 till 2014 but during his playing in Prime FC, several Nigeria top premier league teams Warri Wolves, Enyimba International F.C., Shooting Stars F.C. and Enugu Rangers F.C. made transfer request which negotiation could not finalised. Tope's representative is Ramone Remmie
