= Christian Omeruo =

Nigerian footballer

Personal information
- Full name: Omeruo Christian Obinna
- Date of birth: December 13, 1992 (age 33)
- Place of birth: Ikwuano, Nigeria
- Height: 1.83 m (6 ft 0 in)
- Position: Striker

Youth career
- 2006: Karamone

Senior career*
Years	Team	Apps	(Gls)
2012–2013	COD United F.C.	24	(16)
2013–2015	Sunshine Stars F.C.	39	(24)
2015–2018	Kwara United F.C.	26	(13)
2019	Istiqlol	21	(16)
2020–	Kwara United F.C.		

International career^{‡}
2012–2013	Nigeria U-20	12	(4)
- * Club domestic league appearances and goals as of 21 February 2018 ‡ National team caps and goals as of 2 November 2014

Christian Omeruo (born 13 December 1992) is a Nigerian professional footballer who has played for Nigeria Premier League teams and Nigeria U-20.

He is the older brother of professional footballers Kenneth Omeruo and Lucky Omeruo.

== Career ==
Omeruo is a both footed striker and was discovered by Karamone. He started his professional league football debut with COD United F.C. in 2012/13 season, later signed for Sunshine Stars F.C. and played between 2013 and 2015 Nigeria Premier League season due to his great performances for COD United, He signed a year contract with Kwara United F.C. in the 2015/16 league season. He was invited to the Nigeria U-20 in 2012 and has made 12 caps with 4 goals for the national team in friendly games, championship tournament and qualifier games. He was on the verge of joining some Asian, North Africa and European teams but Sunshine Stars' transfer fee was too high because he was the target striker goalscorer of the team and leading top scorer in the league. He scored braces and lone goal for his teams as one of the brace was against Kano Pillars.
