= Etor Daniel =

Nigerian footballer

- Etor Daniel, Nigerian footballer

Personal information
- Date of birth: 5 May 1993 (age 33)
- Place of birth: Kano, Nigeria
- Height: 1.77 m (5 ft 10 in)
- Position: Forward

Youth career
- 2006: Karamone

Senior career*
Years	Team	Apps	(Gls)
2009–2010	Supreme Court FC	24	(8)
2010–2011	ABS	28	(9)
2011–2013	Niger Tornadoes	21	(13)
2012	→ Akwa United (loan)	9	(3)
2013–2016	Enyimba	63	(21)
2016–2019	Enugu Rangers		
2017–2019	→ Al-Nasr (loan)	15	(5)
2019–2020	Muscat		
2020–2021	Al-Suwaiq		
2021–2022	Al-Qasim		
2022–2023	Sur		
2023–2024	Sohar		
2024–2025	Oman		
2025–2026	Bisha		

International career
2012–2013	Nigeria U-20	4	(1)
2015–	Nigeria U-23	14	(2)
2012–	Nigeria	1	(0)
- * Club domestic league appearances and goals

Etor Daniel Essien (born 5 May 1993) is a Nigerian footballer who plays as a forward.

== Club career ==
Etor Daniel - Al-Nasr S.C.S.C.

Etor Daniel began his youth career with Karamone, the former youth club of Austin Amutu, Akande Abiodun Asimiyu, Oghogho Oduokpe, Razaq Adegbite, Akande Tope. Etor Daniel moved to Supreme Court FC, ABS FC, Niger Tornadoes on loan to Akwa United F.C. 2012. He got the eye of top professional football teams in Nigeria and abroad but finally got transferred into Enyimba Nigeria Premier League mid-season through his representative Ramone Remmie. He scored the winning goal for Enyimba and one of the fantastic goal in the Nigeria Premier League season 2014 against Sunshine Stars F.C.

Etor scored the first goal in the 3–0 home win over Buffles du Borgou FC to give Enyimba their first leg win of the Caf Champions league Cup qualification stage. He had scored 3 goals and 4 goals assist quarter season in all 14 games, he had played as of now 02/06/2015 inclusive Caf Champions League qualification game, Nigeria Federation Cup and Nigeria Premier League season 2015. He won the 2015 Nigeria Premier league season with Enyimba.

=== Al-Nasr ===
He first moved out of Nigeria in 2017 to Oman where he signed a one-year contract with Salalah-based Al-Nasr S.C.S.C. He made his Oman Professional League debut on 13 September 2017 in a 2–0 win over Oman Club and assisted the first goal for his side and scored his first goal in the competition on 18 September 2017 in a 2–0 win over Al-Mudhaibi Club.

=== Muscat Club ===
In September 2019 it was confirmed, that Etor had joined Omani club Muscat Club.

=== Bisha FC ===
On 8 October 2025, that Etor had joined Saudi club Bisha FC.

=== Club career statistics ===
Club	Season	Division	League		Cup		Continental		Other		Total	
Club	Season	Division	Apps	Goals	Apps	Goals	Apps	Goals	Apps	Goals	Apps	Goals
Al-Nasr	2017–18	Oman Professional League	15	5	4	1	0	0	0	0	19	6
Al-Nasr	Total		15	5	4	1	0	0	0	0	19	6
Career total			15	5	4	1	0	0	0	0	19	6

== International career ==
In 2012, he was called up to the Nigeria Super Eagles home-based team. He made his first appearance for the senior national team. He was part of the Nigeria U-20 2012 and 2013. He was selected by Nigeria for their 35-man provisional squad for the 2016 Summer Olympics. Etor Daniel played and won with Nigeria team the 2016 Caf All Africa Games tournament and Caf U23 championship 2016 where he wears the jersey no.9

== Style of play ==
He has been described as a complete forward who possesses pace, accurate ball crosses, brilliant passes to assist goals, good positioning, natural finishing as well as the ability to provide assists to target-man (strikers).
