= Kelechi Harrison =

Nigerian footballer

Personal information
- Date of birth: January 13, 1999 (age 27)
- Place of birth: Akwa-Akatta, Nigeria
- Position: Forward

Team information
- Current team: Warri WolvesF.C.
- Number: 37

Youth career
- 2010: Karamone

Senior career*
Years	Team	Apps	(Gls)
2015–2016	Warri Wolves	19	(4)
2016–2018	Ikorodu United F.C.	12	(3)
2018-2019	Sara Sports de Bafilo	21	(9)
2021-2023	Nasarawa United	17	(8)

International career^{‡}
2015	Nigeria U-20		
- * Club domestic league appearances and goals as of 18 June 2019 ‡ National team caps and goals as of 18 June 2019

Kelechi Harrison or Harrison Kelechi Ukawulazu (born 13 January 1999 in Imo State) is a Nigerian football player currently playing in the Nigeria Premier League for Nasarawa United. He has played for Nigeria Professional Football League (NPFL) team Ikorodu United F.C. of Lagos, [Warri Wolves] of Delta State and is now on his first season stint with Nasarawa United Football Club. In 2018/2019 season he signed for newly promoted Togolese Championat Nationale club Sara Sports de Bafilo where he had a very successful season before being signed by Warri Wolves for the 2019/2020 season; his first professional contract with Warri Wolves while on a pre-season trial tournament with Bendel Insurance who were ready to offer him a professional contract as well, but he chose Wolves because he wanted to play in the CAF Champions League in that season.

== Career ==
Kelechi Harrison spent his academy years at Karamone but made his professional debut with Warri Wolves in 2015 at the Super Four tournament of the Nigeria Professional Football League (NPFL). He later signed for Ikorodu United F.C. in 2015/16 the following Nigeria Premier League season. He was invited to the Nigeria U-20 in 2015.
