= Moshood Kabiru =

Nigerian footballer

Personal information
- Date of birth: June 5, 1996 (age 30)
- Place of birth: Lagos, Nigeria
- Height: 1.90 m (6 ft 3 in)
- Position: Defender

Team information
- Current team: Ikorodu United F.C.
- Number: 5

Youth career
- 2010: Karamone
- 2013–2014: 36 Lion F.C.

Senior career*
| Years | Team | Apps | (Gls) |
| 2014–2016 | Ikorodu United F.C. | 59 | (3) |

International career^{‡}
| 2014 | Nigeria U-23 | | |
- * Club domestic league appearances and goals as of 2 October 2016 ‡ National team caps and goals as of 29 December 2016

Moshood Kabiru (born 8 March 1998 in Isheri-Idimu, Lagos) is a Nigerian football player who currently plays in the Nigeria National League. He was signed by a Nigeria National League team known as Ikorodu United F.C. in the second division league and got the team promoted into the Nigeria Premier League in 2015/2016 season where he made his debut in the Nigeria Premier League.

== Career ==
Kabiru started his professional football career with Ikorodu United F.C. in 2014 then got the promoted into Nigeria Premier League in 2015. He has received interest from top Nigeria Premier League teams since he joined Ikorodu United F.C. . He was invited to the Nigeria U-23 in 2016 but was unable to make the Nigeria Dream Team to the Olympic
