= Alhameen Adeniyi Adegbite =

Nigerian footballer (born 2001)

Alhameen Adegbite
Personal information
- Full name: Alhameen Adegite Adeniyi
- Date of birth: 22 September 2001 (age 25)
- Place of birth: Nigeria
- Height: 1.85 m (6 ft 1 in)
- Position: Forward

Team information
- Current team: Remo Stars F.C.
- Number: 14

Youth career
- 2015: Karamone F.C.

Senior career*
Years	Team	Apps	(Gls)
2022-	Remo Stars F.C.	3	(1)
- * Club domestic league appearances and goals

Alhameen Adeniyi Adegbite (born September 22, 2001) is a Nigerian footballer who plays as a forward for Nigeria Professional league club Remo Stars.

== Career ==
Alhameen Adegite began his football journey at Karamone academy before transferring to Remo Stars during the mid-season break, alongside Sikiru Alimi. On his home debut during matchday 26 of the 2021–22 NPFL Season, he played the entire ninety minutes.

Alhameen is renowned for his attacking prowess and made his debut for Remo Stars in their 1–0 home victory against Wikki Tourists.

He scored his first NPFL goal in the 3–2 defeat against Kastina United.
