= Daouda Diop =

Senegalese footballer (born 1993)

Personal information
- Date of birth: 10 January 1993 (age 33)
- Place of birth: Senegal
- Height: 1.84 m (6 ft 0 in)
- Position: Centre-back

Senior career*
Years	Team	Apps	(Gls)
2011–2014	Stade de Mbour		
2014–2015	Inter Allies	2	(0)
2015–2017	Stade de Mbour		
2017	Ahed	6	(1)
2017–2019	Tadamon Sour	38	(1)
2019	Safa	2	(0)
2019–2022	Stade de Mbour		
2022	Tadamon Sour	8	(0)
- * Club domestic league appearances and goals as of 14:21, 8 February 2023 (UTC)

Daouda Diop (born 10 January 1993) is a Senegalese footballer who plays as a centre-back.

== Club career ==
=== Inter Allies ===
In January 2014, during the 2013–14 season, Diop joined Ghana Premier League club Inter Allies. On 13 May 2014, Diop helped Inter Allies beat Gomoa Fetteh in the semi-finals of the 2014 Ghanaian FA Cup. They eventually lost the final to Asante Kotoko 2–1 after extra time.

Diop helped Inter Allies finish sixth in the league, playing four games: two in the league and two in the cup. He was also awarded the "Most Dedicated Player" award by the club.

=== Ahed ===
On 3 January 2018, Diop moved to Lebanese Premier League club Ahed on a six-month contract; he scored a goal in six matches.

== International career ==
Diop was called up by Senegal U23 for the 2015 African Games; he was an unused substitute throughout the tournament. Senegal eventually won the competition, beating Burkina Faso 1–0 in the final.

== Honours ==
Inter Allies

- Ghanaian FA Cup runner-up: 2014

Ahed

- Lebanese Premier League: 2016–17

Tadamon Sour

- Lebanese Challenge Cup runner-up: 2017

Individual

- Inter Allies Most Dedicated Player: 2013–14
