= Ubong Williams =

Nigerian footballer

Ubong Williams is a footballer who plays as a utility defender and midfielder for Abia Warriors. He previously played for Delta Force. Ubong Williams Edet started his football career from his youth team Karamone F.C. which later went on a season loan to Delta Force F.C. in the Nigeria National League before joining Abia Warriors from his parental team Karamone F.C.
