= Chiamaka Madu =

Nigerian professional footballer

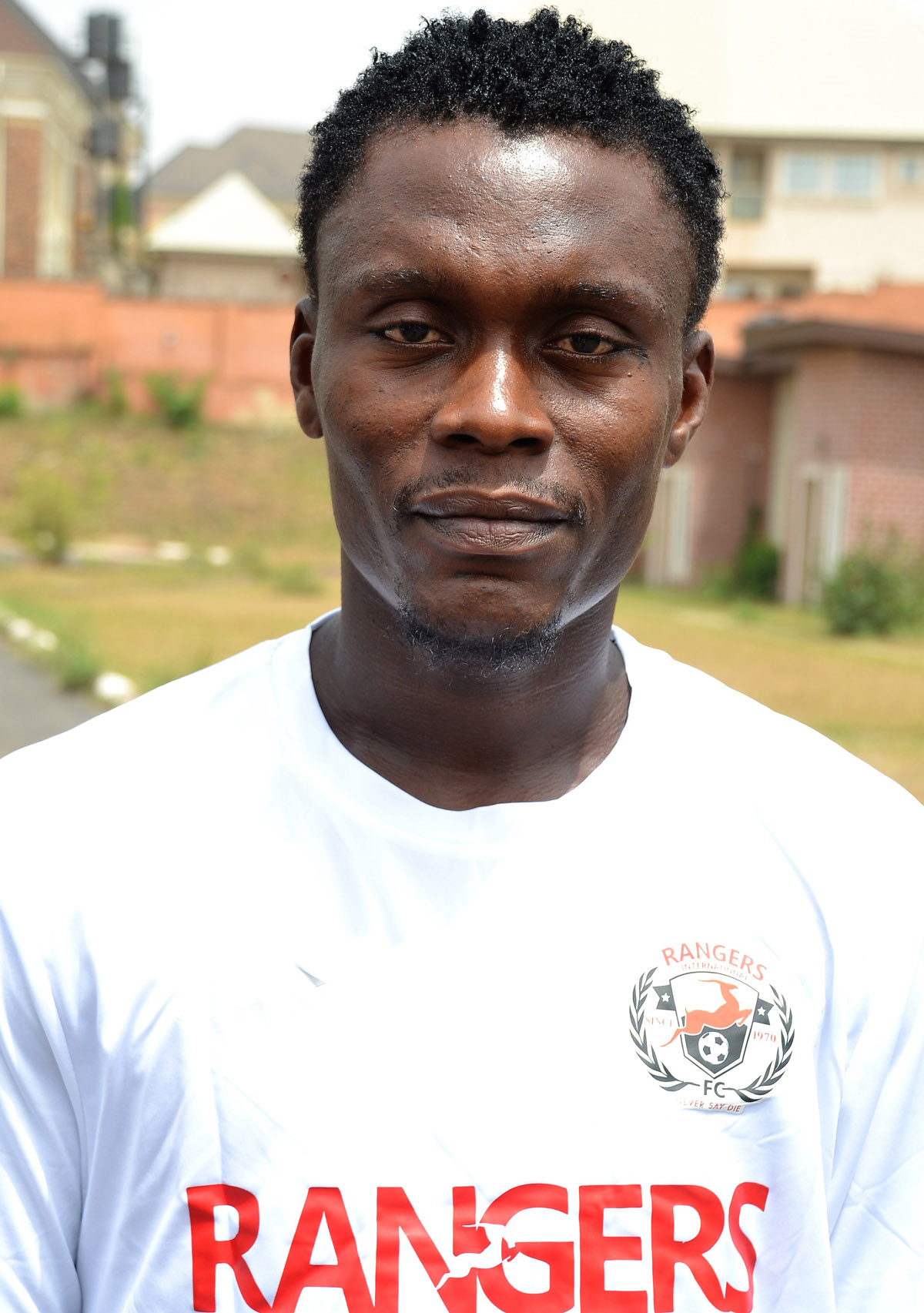
- Chiamaka Madu, 2010

Personal information
- Full name: Chiamaka Emmanuel Madu
- Date of birth: July 27, 1996 (age 30)
- Place of birth: Port Harcourt, Rivers State, Nigeria
- Height: 1.80 m (5 ft 11 in)
- Position: Forward

Team information
- Current team: Enugu Rangers
- Number: 32

Youth career
- 2008: Karamone

Senior career*
| Years | Team | Apps | (Gls) |
| 2010 – 2012 | Ocean Boys | 33 | (15) |
| 2012 – 2015 | Rivers United F.C. | 57 | (19) |
| 2015 – | Enugu Rangers | 23 | (9) |

International career^{‡}
| 2014 | Nigeria U-20 | | |
- * Club domestic league appearances and goals as of 2 December 2016 ‡ National team caps and goals as of 2 December 2016

Chiamaka Madu (born 27 July 1996) is a Nigerian professional footballer who plays for Enugu Rangers, as an offensive midfielder and supporting striker in the Nigeria Premier League. He formerly played for Rivers United F.C. and its predecessor, Sharks for three league seasons.

== Career ==
Chiamaka Madu was discovered by Karamone F.C., started his professional football career debut with Ocean Boys F.C. where he spent two seasons as a teenager, and then joined Sharks F.C. in 2012 where he played for three seasons. He later signed for Enugu Rangers in 2015, scoring a goal in his debut game against Kano Pillars F.C. He was invited to the Nigeria U-20 in 2014.

He won the Nigeria Premier League season 2016 with Enugu Rangers.
