= Olulayo Seun =

Nigerian footballer

Seun Olulayo
Personal information
- Full name: Oluwaseun Olulayo
- Date of birth: 29 March 1996 (age 30)
- Place of birth: Enugu, Nigeria
- Height: 1.77 m (5 ft 10 in)
- Positions: Left back; winger

Team information
- Current team: Sunshine Stars F.C.
- Number: 6

Youth career
- 2006: Karamone

Senior career*
Years	Team	Apps	(Gls)
2010	Rising Stars F.C.	24	(11)
2012–2015	Sunshine Stars F.C.	86	(25)
2016–2017	Abia Warriors	26	(5)
2017	Sunshine Stars F.C.	1	(0)

International career^{‡}
2014	Nigeria U-20	3	(0)
2014	Nigeria U-23	9	(0)
- * Club domestic league appearances and goals as of 6 November 2016 ‡ National team caps and goals as of 6 November 2016

Seun Olulayo (born 29 March 1996) is a professional Nigerian footballer who plays as a left back and the Captain of Sunshine Stars F.C. in the Nigerian Professional Football League.

== Career ==
Seun Olulayo began his career with Rising Stars F.C. In 2012, he was transferred to Sunshine Stars F.C., where he played in the Nigerian Professional Football League. Olulayo signed with Abia Warriors in November 2016.

He won the 2016 CAF U-23 Championship with the Nigeria Dream Team.

== International career ==
Seun Olulayo was member of the Nigeria U-20 2014. He started his professional football career with Rising Stars F.C. in the year 2010 and got promotion into the senior team Sunshine Stars F.C. in 2012.
