= Feyiseitan Asagidigbi =

Nigerian professional footballer

Personal information
- Full name: Oluwafeyiseitan Asagidigbi
- Date of birth: 28 January 1999 (age 27)
- Place of birth: Ilesa, Nigeria
- Height: 1.73 m (5 ft 8 in)
- Position: Attacking midfielder

Team information
- Current team: Almagro

Youth career
- Ilesa West
- Karamone
- 2017–2020: Banfield

Senior career*
Years	Team	Apps	(Gls)
2020–2022	Banfield	0	(0)
2020–2021	→ JJ Urquiza (loan)	7	(0)
2022–	Almagro	1	(0)

International career
- Nigeria U13
- Nigeria U15
- Nigeria U17
- Nigeria U20
- * Club domestic league appearances and goals as of 20:06, 8 August 2022 (UTC)

Oluwafeyiseitan Asagidigbi (born 28 January 1999), commonly known as Feyiseitan Asagidigbi, is a Nigerian professional footballer who plays as an attacking midfielder for Club Almagro.

== Club career ==
Asagidigbi spent a period of his youth career in his hometown with Ilesa West, a club that his father worked for. In 2017, after interest from Rosario Central, Asagidigbi joined the ranks of Banfield from Karamone. After a few years progressing through their academy, the attacking midfielder featured in the club's pre-season preparations in mid-2019, playing in a number of friendlies. However, he did not make a competitive appearance, as he later departed on loan in November 2020 to Primera B Metropolitana side JJ Urquiza. He made his senior debut on 19 December during a 2–1 defeat away to Villa San Carlos.

In June 2022, Asagidigbi joined Primera Nacional side Club Almagro.

== International career ==
After impressing for Ilesa West, Asagidigbi received call-ups from Nigeria's U13 side. He was, despite previously featuring for them, left out of the squad for a 2010 tournament in London, England. The same coach, however, soon selected him for the U15s, as they went on to win the 2014 African Youth Games competition in Gaborone, Botswana; defeating Swaziland in the final. He also featured, in an Africa Cup of Nations qualifier, for the U17s. In 2018, U20s manager Haruna Ilerika called Asagidigbi up for his preliminary squad ahead of the 2019 Africa Cup of Nations in Niger - but he missed the final cut.

== Personal life ==
Asagidigbi's father, Seun, was a professional footballer; notably playing in Saudi Arabia and in their homeland for the likes of Shooting Stars and Stationery Stores. His brother, Madewa, also played football in Nigeria. As a youngster, Asagidigbi attended Total Child Nursery & Primary School and The Salvation Army Secondary School.

== Career statistics ==
As of 31 December 2020.

Appearances and goals by club, season and competition
Club	Season	League			Cup		League Cup		Continental		Other		Total	
Club	Season	Division	Apps	Goals	Apps	Goals	Apps	Goals	Apps	Goals	Apps	Goals	Apps	Goals
Banfield	2020–21 (Note: Soccerway counts Copa de la Liga Profesional appearances as league appearances.)	Torneo Federal A	0	0	0	0	0	0	—		0	0	0	0
JJ Urquiza (loan)	2020	Primera B Metropolitana	1	0	1	0	—		—		0	0	2	0
Career total			1	0	1	0	0	0	—		0	0	2	0

== Honours ==
Nigeria U15

- African Youth Games: 2014
