= Halilu Obadaki =

Nigerian footballer

Personal information
- Date of birth: 20 December 1993 (age 32)
- Place of birth: Nigeria
- Height: 1.78 m (5 ft 10 in)
- Position: Defender

Team information
- Current team: Kwara United F.C.

Youth career
- 2005: Karamone
- 2007–2009: Kaduna United F.C.

Senior career*
Years	Team	Apps	(Gls)
2007–2009	Ranchers Bees F.C.	26	(5)
2010–2016	Kwara United F.C.	110	(17)
2016–2017	El-Kanemi Warriors F.C.	13	(2)
2017–	Crown F.C.		

International career^{‡}
2012–2013	Nigeria U20	5	(0)
2014	Nigeria U23	1	(0)
- * Club domestic league appearances and goals as of 6 November 2016 ‡ National team caps and goals as of 6 November 2016

Halilu Obadaki (born 20 December 1993) is a Nigerian professional footballer who has played for Nigerian Premier League club Kwara United, El-Kanemi Warriors F.C. and presently with Crown F.C. for the 2017 Nigeria National League season

== Career ==
Obadaki began his career with Karamone where he was discovered and trained. He made his professional debut with Kaduna United F.C. in 2007. He got two teams promotion in to the Nigeria Premier League from Nigeria National Pro-league Group A Winner with Kaduna United 2007/2008 and Nigeria National Pro-league Group A Runners-up with Ranchers Bees F.C. 2009/2010.

== International career ==
Obadaki was a member of the Nigeria national under-20 team that qualified for the 2013 African U-20 Championship and 2013 FIFA U-20 World Cup.
