= Tichaona Chipunza =

Zimbabwean international footballer (born 1994)

Personal information
- Full name: Zuze Tichaona Chipunza
- Date of birth: 8 June 1994 (age 32)
- Place of birth: Masvingo, Zimbabwe
- Height: 1.77 m (5 ft 9 1/2 in)
- Position: Defender

Team information
- Current team: Chicken Inn

Youth career
- DC Academy

Senior career*
Years	Team	Apps	(Gls)
2013–2015	Triangle United		
2016–2017	Dynamos		
2018	Ngezi Platinum		
2019–	Chicken Inn	32	(2)

International career^{‡}
2015	Zimbabwe U23	2	(0)
2015–	Zimbabwe	4	(0)
- * Club domestic league appearances and goals as of 02:30, 8 February 2020 (UTC) ‡ National team caps and goals as of 02:30, 8 February 2020 (UTC)

Zuze Tichaona Chipunza (born 8 June 1994) is a Zimbabwean international footballer who plays for Chicken Inn, as a defender.

== Club career ==
Chipunza began his career in 2013 with Triangle United. After three seasons with the club, Chipunza signed for Dynamos. Ahead of the 2018 Zimbabwe Premier Soccer League, Chipunza signed for Ngezi Platinum, following the expiry of his contract with Dynamos, after making 33 league starts in the previous campaign. For the 2019 Zimbabwe Premier Soccer League season, Chipunza signed for Chicken Inn.

== International career ==
Chipunza made two appearances for Zimbabwe U23 at the 2015 African Games. On 17 May 2015, Chipunza made his international debut for Zimbabwe in a 2–0 win against Mauritius at the 2015 COSAFA Cup.
