= Pritchard Mpelele =

Zimbabwean footballer (born 1995)

Personal information
- Date of birth: 16 June 1995 (age 31)
- Place of birth: Hwange, Zimbabwe
- Height: 1.75 m (5 ft 9 in)
- Position: Forward

Team information
- Current team: Manica Diamonds

Senior career*
Years	Team	Apps	(Gls)
2013–2016	Hwange		
2017–2018	Harare City		
2019–	Manica Diamonds		

International career^{‡}
2014–2016	Zimbabwe	6	(0)
- * Club domestic league appearances and goals as of 13 November 2020 ‡ National team caps and goals as of 13 November 2020

Pritchard Mpelele (born 16 June 1995) is a Zimbabwean football striker who currently plays for Manica Diamonds.
