= Nestor Mendy =

Senegalese footballer (born 1995)

Personal information
- Full name: Nestor Pamipi Mendy
- Date of birth: 26 February 1995 (age 31)
- Place of birth: Dakar, Senegal
- Height: 1.75 m (5 ft 9 in)
- Positions: Right back; defensive midfielder

Senior career*
Years	Team	Apps	(Gls)
2014–2015	Douanes		
2015–2017	Diambars		
2017–2019	União Madeira	32	(2)
2019–2020	Beauvais	0	(0)

International career^{‡}
2015	Senegal U23	4	(0)
2016–	Senegal	1	(0)
- * Club domestic league appearances and goals as of 7:21, 8 July 2019 (UTC) ‡ National team caps and goals as of 7:21, 8 July 2019 (UTC)

Nestor Pamipi Mendy (born 26 February 1995) is a Senegalese footballer who plays as either a right back or a defensive midfielder for the Senegal national team.

== Club career ==
Mendy trained with professional South African club Bidvest Wits in July 2016, but failed to earn a contract.

In July 2017, Mendy signed a three-year deal with Portuguese club União Madeira.

== International career ==
Mendy was selected to represent the Senegal under-23 national team at the 2015 African Games in Brazzaville in September. He appeared in one match, it being the semifinal against Congo. They finished in first place, earning a gold medal for the country. The next month, he was again named in the 23-man squad selected to play in the 2015 Africa U-23 Cup of Nations. He appeared in three matches (against South Africa, Zambia and eventual champion Nigeria) as Senegal finished in fourth place.

Mendy made his senior international debut on 10 February 2016 during a friendly against Mexico in Miami.

== Honours ==
=== Club ===
Douanes

- Senegal Premier League (1): 2014–15

=== International ===
Senegal

- African Games (1): 2015
