= Sibusiso Sibeko =

South African soccer player

Personal information
- Full name: Sibusiso Blessing Sibeko
- Date of birth: 24 March 1995 (age 31)
- Place of birth: Durban, South Africa
- Height: 1.73 m (5 ft 8 in)
- Position: Midfielder

Team information
- Current team: Lamontville Golden Arrows
- Number: 19

Senior career*
Years	Team	Apps	(Gls)
2014–2020	Lamontville Golden Arrows	67	(2)
2020–2021	Polokwane City	19	(2)
2021–2023	Marumo Gallants	31	(2)
2023–	Lamontville Golden Arrows	7	(0)
- * Club domestic league appearances and goals as of 18 November 2024

Sibusiso Blessing Sibeko (born 24 March 1995) is a South African soccer player who plays for Lamontville Golden Arrows, as a midfielder.

== Early life and club career ==
Sibeko was born in Durban. He was released by Lamontville Golden Arrows in 2020. He subsequently signed for National First Division side Polokwane City in November 2020.

== International career ==
He was part of the South Africa under-23 squad for the 2015 Africa U-23 Cup of Nations, but did not appear in any of their matches.
