= Moshood Aro =

Nigerian politician

Hon. Aro Moshood Abiodun

Member, Lagos State House of Assembly
- Incumbent
- Assumed office 2023

Personal details
- Born: December 24, 1983 (age 42) Ijede, Lagos State
- Party: All Progressives Congress (APC)
- Education: Lagos State University
- Occupation: Politician, Entrepreneur

Aro Moshood Abiodun (born 24 December 1983), popularly known as AMA, is a Nigerian accountant, entrepreneur, and politician who currently serves as a member of the Lagos State House of Assembly, representing Ikorodu Constituency II under the platform of the All Progressives Congress (APC).

== Early life and education ==
Moshood Aro was born on December 24, 1983, in Ijede, a town in the Ikorodu division of Lagos State. He began his education at Anwar-ul-Islam Primary School, Ijede (1991–1996) and proceeded to Luwasa High School, Ijede, for his secondary education (1996–2002).12 He later attended Lagos State University (LASU), Ojo, where he graduated with a Bachelor of Science (B.Sc.) degree in Accounting (2006–2011).

== Career ==
Before entering politics, Aro had an extensive career in the private sector, particularly in the timber and hospitality industries. He has also held leadership positions in trade associations, serving as the National Publicity Secretary of the Process Wood Producers and Marketers Association of Nigeria and the National Vice Chairman of the Sawmillers Association of Nigeria.

Moshood Aro contested and won the seat to represent Ikorodu Constituency II in the Lagos State House of Assembly during the 2023 general elections on the platform of the All Progressives Congress (APC). Upon his inauguration into the 10th Assembly, he was appointed as the Chairman of the House Committee on Public-Private Partnership (PPP).
