= Oghogho Oduokpe =

Nigerian footballer

Odoukpe Oghogho
Personal information
- Full name: Odoukpe Oghogho
- Date of birth: 25 December 1992 (age 33)
- Place of birth: Oleh, Nigeria
- Height: 1.82 m (5 ft 11 1/2 in)
- Position: Striker

Team information
- Current team: Maccabi Herzliya

Youth career
- 2006: Karamone
- 2009–2010: Tolopia United

Senior career*
Years	Team	Apps	(Gls)
2010–2012	Warri Wolves	40	(26)
2012–2013	Enugu Rangers	42	(26)
2013–2014	Sunshine Stars	16	(11)
2014–2015	Bayelsa United	19	(11)
2015 – 2016	Dolphins	13	(6)
2016–2017	Maccabi Herzliya	14	(6)
- * Club domestic league appearances and goals as of 10 April 2016

Alexander "Oghogho" Oduokpe (born 25 December 1992) is a Nigerian international footballer who plays as a forward for Maccabi Herzliya. Oghogho Oduokpe was discovered by a youth team Karamone then moved to Tolopia United F.C. where he was able to play against Warri Wolves. He made his debut game and debut goal in the Israel league for Maccabi Herzliya gaining a point away, he also scored a goal and assisted a goal on away victory on 11 March 2016.

== Club career ==
He started his playing career with Karamone youth team later joined Tolopia United FC from there got the eye of Warri Wolves of Jos where he started exploding his talents winning a lot of honours and awards such the best striker of the team, team highest goal scorer ever for the team in a season and also was the youngest best striker of Warri Wolves ever signed. He made his way to limelight which made interest from teams locally and internationally but Warri Wolves were unable to convince the powerful and ball shield attacker to stay. He was lured in by Enugu Rangers International Football Club. He was signed by Enugu Rangers to play in the Caf Champions league, Nigeria Premier League and Nigeria Federation FA cup 2012 and 2013 season. He got interest from Different foreign teams in Europe, Asia and African teams that Enugu Rangers played against in the Caf Champions League like Cape Town, He won many honors and awards as MVP player of the game, Best Striker in his team, best goal poacher and wonder goal award. Oghogho Oduokpe's representative is Ramone Remmie.

== CAF Champions and Nigeria Premier League Goals Links ==
- Oghogho Oduokpe Goal for Rangers FC - Nigeria Premier league
- Oghogho Oduokpe brace- Nigeria Premier League
- Oghogho Oduokpe Brace saves Bayelsa Utd from relegation - Nigeria Premier LEague
- Oghogho Oduokpe goal- Nigeria Premier League
- Oghogho Oduokpe goal sealed 3 points- Nigeria Premier league
- Oghogho Oduopke

== International career ==
He had featured for Enugu Rangers International FC in the 2012/13 Caf Champions League. He scored and assisted goals.

== Youtube Video-links ==
- Actions of Oghogho Oduope - youtube
- The Documentary of Oghogho Oduokpe - Youtube video
- One of the best goal of Oghogho Oduokpe - Youtube Video Action
- Oghogho Oduokpe scored 2nd goal - Sunshine stars vs Bayelsa utd
