= Lucky Omeruo =

Nigerian footballer

Personal information
- Date of birth: 15 September 1995 (age 31)
- Place of birth: Abuja, Nigeria
- Height: 1.81 m (5 ft 11 in)
- Position: Forward

Team information
- Current team: KSC City Pirates

Youth career
- 2009–2011: Heart Foundation

Senior career*
| Years | Team | Apps | (Gls) |
- Wikki Tourists
| 2013–2014 | Sunshine Stars | 2 | (0) |
| 2014–2015 | Pembroke Athleta | 24 | (10) |
| 2015–2016 | Tarxien Rainbows | 14 | (1) |
| 2016 | St. George's | 9 | (2) |
| 2016–2018 | Marsa | 20 | (8) |
| 2018 | Palanga | 9 | (0) |
| 2019 | Leganés B | 4 | (0) |
| 2020 | Bilzerse Waltwilder | | |
| 2020– | KSC City Pirates | 92 | (14) |

International career
| 2010 | Nigeria U17 | 1 | (0) |
| 2012 | Nigeria U20 | 2 | (0) |
- * Club domestic league appearances and goals as of 02:55, 3 February 2026 (UTC)

Lucky Omeruo (born 15 September 1995) is a Nigerian professional footballer who plays as a forward for Belgian club KSC City Pirates.

== Career ==
=== Club career ===
Lucky Omeruo is the younger brother of former Chelsea F.C. center back Kenneth Omeruo. Lucky is a pacy forward player who won the league with his team at the end of the 2015 season. He has been with the U-20 national team of Nigeria under coach Obuh and presently has been invited for the U-23 Olympic team of Nigeria.

In January 2020, Omeruo moved to Belgian amateur club Bilzerse Waltwilder. Six months later, he joined fellow belgian club, KSC City Pirates.
