= Ahmed Khalil (footballer, born 1994) =

Tunisian footballer

Personal information
- Date of birth: 21 December 1994 (age 31)
- Place of birth: Tunisia
- Height: 1.87 m (6 ft 2 in)
- Position: Midfielder

Senior career*
Years	Team	Apps	(Gls)
2013–2014	JS Kairouan	17	(0)
2014–2025	Club Africain	188	(7)
2026	Al-Minaa	0	(0)

International career^{‡}
2016–2018	Tunisia	6	(0)
- * Club domestic league appearances and goals as of 07:58, 5 February 2025 (UTC) ‡ National team caps and goals as of 11:59, 18 September 2020 (UTC)

Ahmed Khalil (Arabic: أَحْمَد خَلِيل; born 21 December 1994) is a Tunisian professional footballer who plays as a midfielder.

== Club career ==
Khalil has played for JS Kairouan and Club Africain.

== International career ==
He made his international debut in 2016, and was named in the squad for the 2017 Africa Cup of Nations, and the 2018 FIFA World Cup.

== Career statistics ==
=== International ===
As of 17 July 2019

Tunisia
Year	Apps	Goals
2016	2	0
2017	0	0
2018	3	0
Total	5	0
