= Billy Mutale =

Zambian footballer (born 1993)

Personal information
- Date of birth: 21 June 1993 (age 33)
- Place of birth: Mufulira, Zambia
- Position: Center-back

Team information
- Current team: Forest Rangers

Senior career*
Years	Team	Apps	(Gls)
2013–2014	Nchanga Rangers		
2014–2018	Power Dynamos		
2018–2019	SuperSport United	2	(0)
2020–2021	Nkana		
2021–	Forest Rangers		

International career^{‡}
2015	Zambia U23	2	(0)
2015–	Zambia	6	(0)
- * Club domestic league appearances and goals as of 3 December 2022 ‡ National team caps and goals as of 17 February 2019

Billy Mutale (born 21 June 1993) is a Zambian footballer who plays as a defender for Forest Rangers and the Zambia national football team.
