= Karamone F.C. =

Nigerian football club

Karamone FC
- Full name: Karamone Stars Football Club
- Nickname: The 'Gallant Boys’
- Founded: 2003
- Ground: Lekan Salami Stadium
- Capacity: 18,000
- Vice-President: Ige Ishaq
- Manager: Dogo Kabiru Suleiman
- Website: www.karamonefc.com
Home colours	Away colours	Third colours

Karamone F.C. is a Nigeria football club based in Oyo. They play in the Nigeria Football Federation Cup. They have different stages of football age levels of senior team and under ages. KARAMONE FC bought a third tier division League team and will be playing this season 2025 Nigeria National League one

They have produced top professional football players for west African national teams of all levels and some players plying their trade in Africa, Europe, Asia and America top league teams. Karamone Football Club now having both male and female team known as Karamone F.C. and Karamone Ladies in 4 different age categories (U13, U17, U19 and Senior).

== Notable players ==
- (Benin) Raimi Kola
- (Nigeria) Austin Amutu
- (Nigeria) Etor Daniel
- (Nigeria) Ibrahim Mustapha
- (Nigeria) Akande Tope
- (Nigeria) Ubong Williams
- (Nigeria) Abiodun Akande
- (Nigeria) Dayo Ojo
- (Nigeria) Feyiseitan Asagidigbi
- (Nigeria) Chiamaka Madu
- (Nigeria) Razaq Adegbite
- (Nigeria) Moshood Kabiru
- (Nigeria) Halilu Obadaki
- (Nigeria) Abdulwaheed Afolabi
- (Nigeria) Kelechi Harrison
- (Nigeria) Christian Omeruo
- (Nigeria) Alhameen Adeniyi Adegbite
- (Nigeria) Anas Yusuff SHINA
- (Nigeria) Ewodage ABUBAKR Patrick
- (Nigeria) Odole Adeposi Adedoyin
- (Nigeria) Adewale Yusuff Alani
- (Nigeria) Yusuf Anas Shina
