= Kingsley Sokari =

Nigerian footballer

Personal information
- Date of birth: 30 May 1995 (age 31)
- Place of birth: Nigeria
- Height: 1.72 m (5 ft 8 in)
- Position: Midfielder

Team information
- Current team: Nasaf
- Number: 99

Senior career*
Years	Team	Apps	(Gls)
2013–2015	Enyimba	45	(8)
2015–2021	CS Sfaxien	93	(10)
2021–2024	Pharco FC	49	(1)
2024–2025	Kazma SC	20	(2)
2025–	Nasaf	2	(0)

International career
2015	Nigeria U-20	4	(1)
2015–2016	Nigeria U-23	1	(0)
2015–	Nigeria	2	(0)
- * Club domestic league appearances and goals as of 29 July 2026

Kingsley Sokari (born 30 May 1995) is a Nigerian footballer who plays as a midfielder for Nasaf and Nigeria national team. Nicknamed "new Iniesta" in the Nigerian Premier Football League. Sokari is only the second Nigerian player to play for the U20, U23 team and full national team in the same year after Ahmed Musa in 2011.

== Club career ==
Kingsley Sokari burst onto the scene with Enyimba during the 2013–2014 season. After signing as a youth player following a recruitment exercise in 2013, he was immediately promoted to the first team and would play a part in helping the Aba Millionaires compete in the national league and the CAF African Champions League. During the season, he integrated well into the team forming a vital partnership with teammates providing numerous assists in vital games.

=== Enyimba F.C (2013-) ===
Handed his home debut against perennial rivals Heartland, Sokari warmed his way into Enyimba fans by scoring the deciding goal from a freekick. He would score his second league goal away against Kaduna Utd in a superb solo effort to cap his Man of the match performance. Kingsley was named the NPFL Young player of the year at the end of his first season (2014) and was also nominated for League Bloggers' Player of the season award.

=== CS Sfaxien (2015) ===
The 21-year-old Nigeria U-23 international, Sokari joined the 2013 CAF Confederation Cup winners CS Sfaxien in December 2015 on a three-and-half year deal from Enyimba FC for an undisclosed sum. He scored his second goal for the club in the 49th minute of the match that ended in a 3–1 win over Stade Tunisien. He wears the number 20 jersey for the club.

=== Pharco FC ===
On 9 August 2021, sokari joined Egyptian club Pharco FC on free transfer on a three-year deal.

== International career ==
Following his performances in the NPFL in 2014, Sokari was noticed by the national team handlers. He was invited to train with the U-20 team in preparation for the AYC 2015; played for the U-23 side coached by Samson Siasia and earned his senior cap for the Nigerian national team in a friendly in January 2015. Sokari started the 2015 U-20 World cup game against North Korea, scoring a scorcher from 25 yards for the 3rd goal of the game.

== Honours ==
=== Club ===
- Enyimba:

NPFL 2014 – Runners Up
NPFL 2015 – Champions

=== Individual ===
NPFL Young Player of the Year 2014
