= Moussa Seydi =

Senegalese footballer

Personal information
- Date of birth: 21 August 1996 (age 30)
- Place of birth: Sédhiou, Senegal
- Position: Forward

Team information
- Current team: Luxembourg City
- Number: 18

Youth career
- 2012–2014: Génération Foot

Senior career*
Years	Team	Apps	(Gls)
2014–2017	Metz B	43	(13)
2016–2017	Metz	1	(0)
2017–2020	Fola Esch	48	(30)
2020–2022	Orléans	9	(1)
2021	Orléans B	1	(0)
2022	Jeunesse Esch	12	(6)
2022–2024	Swift Hesperange	11	(0)
2024–2025	RFCU Racing	20	(2)
2025–	Luxembourg City	12	(2)

International career^{‡}
2015	Senegal U23	7	(1)
- * Club domestic league appearances and goals as of 13 June 2026 ‡ National team caps and goals as of 21 June 2017

Moussa Seydi (born 21 August 1996) is a Senegalese professional footballer who plays for Luxembourgish club Luxembourg City as a forward.

== Club career ==
Seydi transferred to Metz from the Senegalese academy of Génération Foot in 2014. He made his senior debut for Metz in a 3–0 Ligue 1 loss against FC Girondins de Bordeaux on 21 September 2016.

In July, Seydi signed a three-year deal with CS Fola Esch in Luxembourg. For the truncated 2019–20 Luxembourg National Division season, Seydi was voted as the best player by Luxembourg sporting website Mental.lu, having scored thirteen goals in sixteen appearances.

At the start of December 2020, Seydi joined Orléans after a trial, signing an 18 month contract.

On 30 January 2022, Seydi returned to Luxembourg and signed with Jeunesse Esch.

== International career ==
Seydi is a youth international for Senegal. He scored the tournament winning goal for the Senegal U23 at the 2015 African Games - Men's tournament
