= Tafadzwa Kutinyu =

Zimbabwean association football player (born 1994)

Personal information
- Full name: Tafadzwa Raphael Kutinyu
- Date of birth: 22 December 1994 (age 31)
- Place of birth: Mufakose, Zimbabwe
- Position: Central midfielder

Team information
- Current team: Horoya

Senior career*
Years	Team	Apps	(Gls)
2013–2014	Notwane		
2014–2015	Bantu Rovers		
2015–2017	Chicken Inn		
2017–2018	Singida United		
2018–2019	Azam		
2019–2023	Horoya	7	(1)
2023-	Chicken Inn FC		

International career^{‡}
2015–	Zimbabwe	12	(0)
Medal record
Men's football
Representing Zimbabwe
COSAFA Cup
Winner	2017 South Africa
Third place	2019 South Africa
- * Club domestic league appearances and goals ‡ National team caps and goals as of 16 February 2019

Tafadzwa Raphael Kutinyu (born 22 December 1994) is a Zimbabwean professional footballer who plays as a midfielder for Horoya AC and the Zimbabwe national football team.

== Honours ==
Zimbabwe

- COSAFA Cup: 2017; 3rd place, 2019
