= Omar Kaboré =

Burkinabé footballer (born 1993)

Personal information
- Date of birth: 30 August 1993 (age 33)
- Place of birth: Ouagadougou, Burkina Faso
- Height: 1.78 m (5 ft 10 in)
- Position: Forward

Team information
- Current team: CF Mounana

Senior career*
Years	Team	Apps	(Gls)
2011–2014	Étoile Filante		
2014–2015	USFA		
2015	Missile FC		
2017	El Raja SC		
2018–	CF Mounana		

International career^{‡}
2015–	Burkina Faso	1	(0)
- * Club domestic league appearances and goals ‡ National team caps and goals as of 22:05, 15 September 2015 (UTC)

Omar Kaboré (born 30 August 1993) is a Burkinabé footballer who plays for Lusaka Dynamos in Zambia having joined as free agent from CF Mounana.

Kaboré joined Egyptian Premier League side El Raja SC in September 2017.
