= Boubacar Cissokho =

Senegalese footballer (born 1994)

Personal information
- Full name: Boubacar Cissokho
- Date of birth: 6 December 1994 (age 31)
- Place of birth: Senegal
- Position: Defender

Team information
- Current team: Jawalakhel YC
- Number: 24

Senior career*
Years	Team	Apps	(Gls)
2010–2019	Dakar Sacré-Cœur		
2019–2020	Al-Thoqbah	15	(1)
2024	Calicut		

International career^{‡}
- Senegal U-23
2013–	Senegal	3	(0)
- * Club domestic league appearances and goals ‡ National team caps and goals as of 7 January 2017

Boubacar Cissokho (born 6 December 1994) is a Senegalese footballer who currently plays as a defender.

== International career ==
Cissokho was part of the Senegalese U-23 selection that participated in the 2015 U-23 Africa Cup of Nations in Senegal. He played his first international game with the senior national team on 17 October 2015 in and against Guinea (2–0), where he was part of the starting squad and played the entire match.
