= Abiodun Akande =

Nigerian football goalkeeper

Personal information
- Full name: Abiodun Asimi Akande
- Date of birth: 10 December 1993 (age 32)
- Place of birth: Ibadan, Nigeria
- Height: 1.88 m (6 ft 2 in)
- Position: Goalkeeper

Team information
- Current team: Plateau United

Youth career
- Karamone: 2005
- Oppy Stars FC: 2008

Senior career*
Years	Team	Apps	(Gls)
2009	Shooting Stars Team B	28	(2)
2010–2015	Shooting Stars	67	(1)
2015–2016	Sunshine Stars	11	(0)
2016–2018	Rivers United	?	(?)
2019–2021	Sunshine Stars	?	(?)
2021–	Plateau United	?	(?)

International career
2009	Nigeria U-17		
2011	Nigeria U-20		
2014	Nigeria U-23		
- * Club domestic league appearances and goals as of 15 February 2019

Abiodun Akande (born 10 December 1993 in Ibadan, Oyo State) is a Nigerian football goalkeeper who plays for Plateau United. He has played for Shooting Stars F.C., Sunshine Stars F.C., Rivers United. In 2021, he started playing for Plateau United till now.

== Career ==
Abiodun Akande began his professional career with Shooting Stars F.C. during the 2010 season. After signing as a youth player following 2009 Nigeria Football Federation Cup state qualification level in 2010 when Shooting Stars played against Oppy STars FC. he was signed in 2009 to the senior team but held to be with the Team B, after few weeks, he was promoted to the first team and started making an integral part in helping the Oluyole Warriors compete in the Nigeria Premier League. During the season, he integrated well into the team, forming a vital partnership with teammates, providing numerous assists and clean sheets in vital games. One of his respected goalkeeper trainer who impacted greatly to his career is former Sunshine Stars F.C. Coach Daramola Nicholas Akinsehinwa between the year 2015 to 2016 during his playing time with Sunshine Stars F.C.

=== Shooting Stars F.C (2010-2015) ===
Handed his home debut against perennial rivals Warri wolves FC in Ibadan 2010 Nigeria Premier League Season. Abiodun was named the NPFL best Youngest goalkeeper of the year at the end of his first season (2010, 2011, 2012) and also won the best Goalkeeper in the Nigeria National League 2014 that got Shooting Stars FC promoted back to the Nigeria Premier League.

== International ==
He has played for Nigeria U-17, Nigeria U-20 and Nigeria U-23
