= Christian Pyagbara =

Nigerian footballer

Personal information
- Full name: Dumte Christian Pyagbara
- Date of birth: 13 March 1996 (age 30)
- Place of birth: Nigeria
- Height: 1.85 m (6 ft 1 in)
- Position: Forward

Youth career
- Sharks

Senior career*
Years	Team	Apps	(Gls)
2013–2015	Sharks		
2015–2017	Enyimba International		
2017–2018	Akwa United		
2018	Enugu Rangers		
2018	AS Gabès	0	(0)
2018–2019	Damac		
2019–2020	Heartland		
2020–2021	Ventspils		
2021–2022	Al-Sharq		
2023–	Shooting Stars	24	(10)

International career
2013–2015	Nigeria U-20		
2014–	Nigeria		
- * Club domestic league appearances and goals

Dumte Christian Pyagbara (born 13 March 1996) is a Nigerian professional footballer, who plays as a forward for Shooting Stars Sports Club of Ibadan in the Nigeria Premier Football League.

== International career ==
In January 2014, coach Stephen Keshi, invited Pyagbara to be included in the Nigeria 23-man team for the 2014 African Nations Championship. He helped the team defeat Zimbabwe to a third-place finish, by a goal to nil.
