= Mohamed Sydney Sylla =

Burkinabé association football player

Personal information
- Date of birth: 27 December 1996 (age 29)
- Place of birth: Abidjan, Ivory Coast
- Height: 1.84 m (6 ft 0 in)
- Position: Midfielder

Team information
- Current team: VSG Altglienicke
- Number: 24

Youth career
- 2018–2020: Vitória de Setúbal U23

Senior career*
Years	Team	Apps	(Gls)
2014–2016	USFA		
2016–2017	RC Kadiogo		
2017–2018	Salitas		
2020–2021	Beira-Mar	16	(1)
2022	CFC Hertha 06	3	(3)
2024–2025	SV Sparta Lichtenberg	10	(7)
2025	Viktoria Berlin	16	(0)
2025–	VSG Altglienicke	41	(9)

International career^{‡}
2015–	Burkina Faso	8	(3)
- * Club domestic league appearances and goals as of 23 September 2026 ‡ National team caps and goals as of 1 February 2018

Mohamed Sydney Sylla (born 27 December 1996) is a professional footballer who plays for German Regionalliga Nordost club VSG Altglienicke. Born in the Ivory Coast, he represents Burkina Faso internationally.

== International career ==
=== International goals ===
Scores and results list Burkina Faso's goal tally first.

No	Date	Venue	Opponent	Score	Result	Competition
1.	12 August 2017	Stade du 4 Août, Ouagadougou, Burkina Faso	Ghana	1–1	2–2	2018 African Nations Championship qualification
2.	20 August 2017	Baba Yara Stadium, Kumasi, Ghana	Ghana	1–0	2–1	2018 African Nations Championship qualification
3.	23 January 2018	Stade Ibn Batouta, Tangier, Morocco	Cameroon	1–0	1–1	2018 African Nations Championship
