= Kader Bidimbou =

Congolese professional footballer

Personal information
- Full name: Georges Kader Bidimbou
- Date of birth: 20 February 1996 (age 30)
- Place of birth: Congo
- Height: 1.76 m (5 ft 9 in)
- Position: Forward

Senior career*
| Years | Team | Apps | (Gls) |
| 2011–2012 | JS Talangaï | | |
| 2012–2013 | ACNFF | | |
| 2013–2015 | AC Léopards | | |
| 2015–2016 | Sanjoanense | 6 | (1) |
| 2016–2017 | Olympique Khouribga | | |
| 2018 | Diables Noirs | | |
| 2019 | CABBA | 6 | (1) |
| 2019–2021 | Hafia | | |
| 2021–2022 | Al-Rustaq | | |
| 2022–2024 | AS Otohô | | |
| 2024–2025 | Mosul SC | | |

International career^{‡}
| 2014– | Congo | 7 | (1) |
- * Club domestic league appearances and goals as of 19:41, 16 April 2026 (UTC) ‡ National team caps and goals as of 20 January 2018

Kader Bidimbou (born 20 February 1996) is a Congolese professional footballer, who has played as a forward for various African and Middle Eastern clubs.

== Professional Career ==
Bidimbou has played for 9 clubs, beginning with ACNFF in 2014, and most recently Al-Mosul SC.

== International career ==
In January 2014, coach Claude Leroy, invited him to be a part of the Congo squad for the 2014 African Nations Championship. The team was eliminated in the group stages after losing to Ghana, drawing with Libya and defeating Ethiopia, the game in which Bidimbou made his full international debut.

=== International goals ===
Scores and results list Congo's goal tally first.

| No | Date | Venue | Opponent | Score | Result | Competition |
|---|---|---|---|---|---|---|
| 1. | 20 January 2018 | Stade Adrar, Agadir, Morocco | Burkina Faso | 2–0 | 2–0 | 2018 African Nations Championship |
