= Ikorodu United F.C. =

Nigerian football club

Ikorodu United
- Full name: Ikorodu United Football Club
- Founded: 1 January 2009; 17 years ago
- Ground: Onikan Stadium
- Capacity: 10,000
- Owner: Adewunmi Ogunsanya Esq.
- Chairman: Adeola Adelanwa

Ikorodu United Football Club is a football club based in Lagos. In 2015–16, Ikorodu United played in the Nigeria Premier League after gaining consecutive promotions from the Nigeria Nationwide League and Nigeria National League.

Ikorodu United FC were held to a 1–1 draw by Abia Warriors FC in their first ever Nigerian Professional Football league fixture in the history of the club on Match day 1 on home soil at the 10,000-capacity Onikan Stadium, Lagos State.

== Stadium ==
The 5,000 capacity Onikan Stadium is the home ground of Ikorodu United F.C.

== Current squad ==
Note: Flags indicate national team as defined under FIFA eligibility rules; some limited exceptions apply. Players may hold more than one non-FIFA nationality.

No.	Pos.	Nation	Player
34	GK	NGA	Semiu Adegboyega
1	GK	NGA	Segun Fatunwase
2	MD	NGA	Fatai Abdullahi
4	LWB	NGA	Dede Moughara
5	DF	NGA	Chiemerie Anozie
6	LWB	NGA	Rafiu Monsoru
7	FW	NGA	Bashiru Bamgbopa
10	ATT	NGA	Stephen Adodo
11	FW	NGA	Henry Emmanuel
12	RWB	NGA	Michael Adenodi

No.	Pos.	Nation	Player
13	DM	NGA	Sailas Roland
15	ATT	NGA	Gafa Lasisi
18	MD	NGA	Akeem Osho
20	DM	NGA	Omini Somtochukwu
19	MD	NGA	Stephen Anyanwu
34	MD	NGA	Dele Taiwo
23	DF	NGA	Chinedu Enuademu
24	DF	NGA	Tope Akande
27	AM	NGA	Shakiru Jolaosho
28	DF	NGA	Oluwole Johnson Balogun
8	AM	NGA	Sadiq Roliwan
