= Football at the 2012 Summer Olympics – Men's team squads =

The following is a list of squads for each nation that competed in men's football at the 2012 Summer Olympics in London. Each nation had to submit a squad of 18 players, at least 15 of whom had to be born on or after 1 January 1989; no more than three could be older. A minimum of two goalkeepers (plus one optional dispensation goalkeeper) had to be included in the squad.

== Group A ==
=== Great Britain ===
The following is the Great Britain squad in the men's football tournament of the 2012 Summer Olympics.

As part of an agreement with the FA, no players from England's Euro 2012 squad were selected. However, an agreement was made to allow Jack Butland to play on both squads. Butland, a late injury replacement for the Euro 2012 team, did not play in the tournament as England's third goalkeeper, and was allowed to keep his Olympic roster spot.

Coach: Stuart Pearce

No.	Pos.	Player	Date of birth (age)	Caps	Goals	2012 club
1	GK	Jack Butland	10 March 1993 (aged 19)	1	0	(The Football Association) Birmingham City
2	DF	Neil Taylor	7 February 1989 (aged 23)	1	0	(Football Association of Wales) Swansea City
3	DF	Ryan Bertrand	5 August 1989 (aged 22)	1	0	(The Football Association) Chelsea
4	DF	Danny Rose	2 July 1990 (aged 22)	1	0	(The Football Association) Tottenham Hotspur
5	DF	Steven Caulker	29 December 1991 (aged 20)	1	0	(The Football Association) Tottenham Hotspur
6	DF	Craig Dawson	6 May 1990 (aged 22)	1	0	(The Football Association) West Bromwich Albion
7	MF	Tom Cleverley	12 August 1989 (aged 22)	1	0	(The Football Association) Manchester United
8	MF	Joe Allen	14 March 1990 (aged 22)	1	0	(Football Association of Wales) Swansea City
9	FW	Daniel Sturridge	1 September 1989 (aged 22)	1	0	(The Football Association) Chelsea
10	FW	Craig Bellamy*	13 July 1979 (aged 33)	1	0	(The Football Association) Liverpool
11	MF	Ryan Giggs* (c)	29 November 1973 (aged 38)	1	0	(The Football Association) Manchester United
12	DF	James Tomkins	29 March 1989 (aged 23)	1	0	(The Football Association) West Ham United
13	MF	Jack Cork	25 June 1989 (aged 23)	1	0	(The Football Association) Southampton
14	DF	Micah Richards*	24 June 1988 (aged 24)	1	0	(The Football Association) Manchester City
15	MF	Aaron Ramsey	26 December 1990 (aged 21)	1	0	(The Football Association) Arsenal
16	MF	Scott Sinclair	25 March 1989 (aged 23)	1	0	(Football Association of Wales) Swansea City
17	FW	Marvin Sordell	17 February 1991 (aged 21)	1	0	(The Football Association) Bolton Wanderers
18	GK	Jason Steele	18 August 1990 (aged 21)	1	0	(The Football Association) Middlesbrough

* Over-aged player.

=== Senegal ===
The following is the Senegal squad in the men's football tournament of the 2012 Summer Olympics.

Coach: Joseph Koto

No.	Pos.	Player	Date of birth (age)	Caps	Goals	2012 club
1	GK	Ousmane Mané	1 October 1990 (aged 21)			(Senegalese Football Federation) Diambars
2	DF	Saliou Ciss	15 September 1989 (aged 22)			(Norwegian Football Federation) Tromsø
3	MF	Ibrahima Seck	10 August 1989 (aged 22)			(French Football Federation) Épinal
4	DF	Abdoulaye Ba	1 January 1991 (aged 21)			(Portuguese Football Federation) Académica
5	DF	Papa Gueye*	7 June 1984 (aged 28)			(Ukrainian Association of Football) Metalist Kharkiv
6	DF	Zargo Touré	11 November 1989 (aged 22)			(French Football Federation) Boulogne
7	FW	Moussa Konaté	3 April 1993 (aged 19)			(Israel Football Association) Maccabi Tel Aviv
8	MF	Cheikhou Kouyaté	21 December 1989 (aged 22)			(Royal Belgian Football Association) Anderlecht
9	DF	Kara Mbodj	11 November 1989 (aged 22)			(Norwegian Football Federation) Tromsø
10	MF	Sadio Mané	10 April 1992 (aged 20)			(French Football Federation) Metz
11	FW	Kalidou Yéro	19 August 1991 (aged 20)			(Portuguese Football Federation) Gil Vicente
12	FW	Ibrahima Baldé	4 April 1989 (aged 23)			(Royal Spanish Football Federation) Osasuna
13	MF	Mohamed Diamé* (c)	14 June 1987 (aged 25)			(The Football Association) West Ham United
14	MF	Idrissa Gueye	26 September 1989 (aged 22)			(French Football Federation) Lille
15	FW	Magaye Gueye	6 July 1990 (aged 22)			(The Football Association) Everton
16	DF	Pape Souare	6 June 1990 (aged 22)			(French Football Federation) Lille
17	MF	Stéphane Badji	29 May 1990 (aged 22)			(Norwegian Football Federation) Sogndal
18	GK	Papa Camara	16 January 1993 (aged 19)			(French Football Federation) Sochaux

* Over-aged player.

=== United Arab Emirates ===
The following is the United Arab Emirates squad in the men's football tournament of the 2012 Summer Olympics.

Coach: Mahdi Ali

No.	Pos.	Player	Date of birth (age)	Caps	Goals	2012 club
1	GK	Ali Khasif*	9 June 1987 (aged 25)			(United Arab Emirates Football Association) Al Jazira
2	DF	Saad Surour	19 July 1990 (aged 22)			(United Arab Emirates Football Association) Al Ahli
3	DF	Abdulaziz Hussain	10 September 1990 (aged 21)			(United Arab Emirates Football Association) Al Shabab
4	DF	Mohamed Ahmed	16 April 1989 (aged 23)			(United Arab Emirates Football Association) Al Shabab
5	MF	Amer Abdulrahman	3 July 1989 (aged 23)			(United Arab Emirates Football Association) Baniyas
6	DF	Ali Alamri	7 January 1989 (aged 23)			(United Arab Emirates Football Association) Al Nasr
7	MF	Ismail Al Hammadi*	1 July 1988 (aged 24)			(United Arab Emirates Football Association) Al Ahli
8	DF	Hamdan Al Kamali	2 May 1989 (aged 23)			(United Arab Emirates Football Association) Al Wahda
9	MF	Ahmed Ali	28 January 1990 (aged 22)			(United Arab Emirates Football Association) Baniyas
10	FW	Ismail Matar* (c)	7 April 1983 (aged 29)			(United Arab Emirates Football Association) Al Wahda
11	FW	Ahmed Khalil	8 June 1991 (aged 21)			(United Arab Emirates Football Association) Al Ahli
12	MF	Habib Fardan	11 November 1990 (aged 21)			(United Arab Emirates Football Association) Al Nasr
13	MF	Khamis Esmaeel	16 August 1989 (aged 22)			(United Arab Emirates Football Association) Emirates
14	DF	Abdelaziz Sanqour	7 May 1989 (aged 23)			(United Arab Emirates Football Association) Al Sharjah
15	MF	Omar Abdulrahman	20 September 1991 (aged 20)			(United Arab Emirates Football Association) Al Ain
16	MF	Rashed Eisa	24 August 1990 (aged 21)			(United Arab Emirates Football Association) Al Wasl
17	MF	Mohamed Fawzi	22 February 1990 (aged 22)			(United Arab Emirates Football Association) Baniyas
18	GK	Khalid Eisa	15 May 1989 (aged 23)			(United Arab Emirates Football Association) Al Jazira
19	FW	Ali Mabkhout (Note: Alternate player named in the squad. He played 25 minutes of the UAE's last game of the tournament.)	10 May 1990 (aged 22)			(United Arab Emirates Football Association) Al Jazira

* Over-aged player.

=== Uruguay ===
The following is the Uruguay squad in the men's football tournament of the 2012 Summer Olympics.

Coach: Óscar Tabárez

No.	Pos.	Player	Date of birth (age)	Caps	Goals	2012 club
1	GK	Martín Campaña	29 May 1989 (aged 23)	3	0	(Uruguayan Football Association) Cerro Largo
2	DF	Ramón Arias	27 July 1992 (aged 19)	3	0	(Uruguayan Football Association) Defensor Sporting
3	DF	Diego Polenta	6 February 1992 (aged 20)	1	0	(Italian Football Federation) Genoa
4	DF	Sebastián Coates	7 October 1990 (aged 21)	2	0	(The Football Association) Liverpool
5	DF	Emiliano Albín	24 January 1989 (aged 23)	3	0	(Uruguayan Football Association) Peñarol
6	DF	Alexis Rolín	7 February 1989 (aged 23)	3	0	(Uruguayan Football Association) Nacional
7	FW	Edinson Cavani*	14 February 1987 (aged 25)	2	3	(Italian Football Federation) Napoli
8	MF	Maximiliano Calzada	21 April 1990 (aged 22)	3	0	(Uruguayan Football Association) Nacional
9	FW	Luis Suárez* (c)	24 January 1987 (aged 25)	2	3	(The Football Association) Liverpool
10	MF	Gastón Ramírez	2 December 1990 (aged 21)	2	1	(Italian Football Federation) Bologna
11	FW	Abel Hernández	8 August 1990 (aged 21)	2	1	(Italian Football Federation) Palermo
12	FW	Jonathan Urretaviscaya	19 March 1990 (aged 22)	2	0	(Portuguese Football Federation) Benfica
13	DF	Matías Aguirregaray	1 April 1989 (aged 23)	2	0	(Italian Football Federation) Palermo
14	MF	Nicolás Lodeiro	21 March 1989 (aged 23)	2	0	(Brazilian Football Confederation) Botafogo
15	MF	Diego Rodríguez	4 September 1989 (aged 22)	3	0	(Uruguayan Football Association) Defensor Sporting
16	MF	Tabaré Viudez	8 September 1989 (aged 22)	3	0	(Uruguayan Football Association) Nacional
17	MF	Egidio Arévalo*	1 January 1982 (aged 30)	2	0	(Italian Football Federation) Palermo
18	GK	Leandro Gelpi	27 February 1991 (aged 21)	0	0	(Uruguayan Football Association) Peñarol

* Over-aged player.

== Group B ==
=== Gabon ===
The following is the Gabon squad in the men's football tournament of the 2012 Summer Olympics.

Coach: Claude Albert Mbourounot

No.	Pos.	Player	Date of birth (age)	Caps	Goals	2012 club
1	GK	Didier Ovono* (c)	23 January 1983 (aged 29)			(French Football Federation) Le Mans
2	DF	Muller Dinda	22 September 1995 (aged 16)			(Gabonese Football Federation) Cercle Mbéri
3	DF	Stevy Nzambe	4 September 1991 (aged 20)			(French Football Federation) Marseille
4	MF	Franck Engonga	26 July 1993 (aged 19)			(Gabonese Football Federation) USM Libreville
5	DF	Bruno Ecuele Manga*	16 July 1988 (aged 24)			(French Football Federation) Lorient
6	DF	Rémy Ebanega	17 November 1989 (aged 22)			(Gabonese Football Federation) Bitam
7	FW	Allen Nono	15 August 1992 (aged 19)			(Gabonese Football Federation) USM Libreville
8	MF	Alexander N'Doumbou	4 January 1992 (aged 20)			(French Football Federation) Orléans
9	FW	Pierre-Emerick Aubameyang	18 June 1989 (aged 23)			(French Football Federation) Saint-Étienne
10	MF	Lévy Madinda	11 June 1992 (aged 20)			(Royal Spanish Football Federation) Celta Vigo B
11	FW	Axel Meye	6 June 1995 (aged 17)			(Gabonese Football Federation) Bitam
12	MF	Merlin Tandjigora	6 April 1990 (aged 22)			(French Football Federation) Carquefou
13	MF	Cédric Boussoughou	20 July 1991 (aged 21)			(Gabonese Football Federation) Mangasport
14	MF	André Biyogo Poko	1 January 1993 (aged 19)			(French Football Federation) Bordeaux
15	MF	Henri Ndong	23 August 1992 (aged 19)			(Gabonese Football Federation) Bitam
16	DF	Emmanuel Ndong	4 May 1992 (aged 20)			(Gabonese Football Federation) Sogéa
17	MF	Jerry Obiang	10 June 1992 (aged 20)			(Gabonese Football Federation) Sogéa
18	GK	Anthony Mfa Mezui	7 March 1991 (aged 21)			(French Football Federation) Metz
21	MF	Samson Mbingui	9 February 1992 (aged 20)			(Gabonese Football Federation) Mangasport

* Over-aged player.

=== Mexico ===
The following is the Mexico squad in the men's football tournament of the 2012 Summer Olympics.

Coach: Luis Fernando Tena

No.	Pos.	Player	Date of birth (age)	Caps	Goals	2012 club
1	GK	José de Jesús Corona* (c)	26 January 1981 (aged 31)	12	0	(Mexican Football Federation) Cruz Azul
2	DF	Israel Jiménez	13 June 1989 (aged 23)	7	1	(Mexican Football Federation) UANL
3	DF	Carlos Salcido*	2 April 1980 (aged 32)	0	0	(Mexican Football Federation) UANL
4	DF	Hiram Mier	25 August 1989 (aged 22)	14	1	(Mexican Football Federation) Monterrey
5	DF	Dárvin Chávez	21 November 1989 (aged 22)	15	0	(Mexican Football Federation) Monterrey
6	MF	Héctor Herrera	19 April 1990 (aged 22)	11	1	(Mexican Football Federation) Pachuca
7	MF	Javier Cortés	20 July 1989 (aged 23)	11	1	(Mexican Football Federation) UNAM
8	MF	Marco Fabián	21 July 1989 (aged 23)	12	12	(Mexican Football Federation) Guadalajara
9	FW	Oribe Peralta*	12 January 1984 (aged 28)	5	6	(Mexican Football Federation) Santos Laguna
10	FW	Giovani dos Santos	11 May 1989 (aged 23)	0	0	(The Football Association) Tottenham Hotspur
11	MF	Javier Aquino	11 February 1990 (aged 22)	17	0	(Mexican Football Federation) Cruz Azul
12	FW	Raúl Jiménez	5 May 1991 (aged 21)	5	1	(Mexican Football Federation) América
13	DF	Diego Reyes	19 September 1992 (aged 19)	12	1	(Mexican Football Federation) América
14	MF	Jorge Enríquez	8 January 1991 (aged 21)	17	1	(Mexican Football Federation) Guadalajara
15	DF	Néstor Vidrio	22 March 1989 (aged 23)	5	0	(Mexican Football Federation) Pachuca
16	DF	Miguel Ponce	12 April 1989 (aged 23)	13	5	(Mexican Football Federation) Guadalajara
17	DF	Néstor Araujo	29 August 1991 (aged 20)	9	0	(Mexican Football Federation) Cruz Azul
18	GK	José Antonio Rodríguez	4 July 1992 (aged 20)	4	0	(Mexican Football Federation) Guadalajara

* Over-aged player.

=== South Korea ===
The following is the South Korea roster in the men's football tournament of the 2012 Summer Olympics.

Coach: Hong Myung-bo

No.	Pos.	Player	Date of birth (age)	Caps	Goals	2012 club
1	GK	Jung Sung-ryong*	4 January 1985 (aged 27)	17	1	(Korea Football Association) Suwon Samsung Bluewings
2	DF	Oh Jae-suk	4 January 1990 (aged 22)	14	0	(Korea Football Association) Gangwon FC
3	DF	Yun Suk-young	13 February 1990 (aged 22)	16	0	(Korea Football Association) Jeonnam Dragons
4	DF	Kim Young-gwon	27 February 1990 (aged 22)	13	0	(Chinese Football Association) Guangzhou Evergrande
5	DF	Kim Kee-hee	13 July 1989 (aged 23)	2	2	(Korea Football Association) Daegu FC
6	MF	Ki Sung-yueng	24 April 1989 (aged 23)	14	0	(Scottish Football Association) Celtic
7	MF	Kim Bo-kyung	6 October 1989 (aged 22)	19	4	(Japan Football Association) Cerezo Osaka
8	MF	Baek Sung-dong	13 August 1991 (aged 20)	7	2	(Japan Football Association) Júbilo Iwata
9	FW	Ji Dong-won	28 May 1991 (aged 21)	10	2	(The Football Association) Sunderland
10	FW	Park Chu-young*	10 July 1985 (aged 27)	22	9	(The Football Association) Arsenal
11	MF	Nam Tae-hee	3 July 1991 (aged 21)	2	2	(Qatar Football Association) Lekhwiya
12	DF	Hwang Seok-ho	27 June 1989 (aged 23)	2	0	(Japan Football Association) Sanfrecce Hiroshima
13	MF	Koo Ja-cheol (c)	27 February 1989 (aged 23)	8	3	(German Football Association) FC Augsburg
14	DF	Kim Chang-soo*	12 September 1985 (aged 26)	18	1	(Korea Football Association) Busan IPark
15	MF	Park Jong-woo	10 March 1989 (aged 23)	4	1	(Korea Football Association) Busan IPark
16	MF	Jung Woo-young	14 December 1989 (aged 22)	6	0	(Japan Football Association) Kyoto Sanga
17	FW	Kim Hyun-sung	27 September 1989 (aged 22)	6	2	(Korea Football Association) FC Seoul
18	GK	Lee Bum-young	2 April 1989 (aged 23)	9	0	(Korea Football Association) Busan IPark

* Over-aged player.

=== Switzerland ===
The following is the Switzerland squad in the men's football tournament of the 2012 Summer Olympics.

Coach: Pierluigi Tami

No.	Pos.	Player	Date of birth (age)	Caps	Goals	2012 club
1	GK	Diego Benaglio* (c)	8 September 1983 (aged 28)	1	0	(German Football Association) VfL Wolfsburg
2	MF	Xavier Hochstrasser*	1 July 1988 (aged 24)	1	0	(Swiss Football Association) Luzern
3	DF	Fabio Daprelà	19 February 1991 (aged 21)	1	0	(Italian Football Federation) Brescia
4	MF	Oliver Buff	3 August 1992 (aged 19)	0	0	(Swiss Football Association) Zürich
5	DF	François Affolter	13 March 1991 (aged 21)	1	0	(German Football Association) Werder Bremen
6	MF	Alain Wiss	21 August 1990 (aged 21)	1	0	(Swiss Football Association) Luzern
7	FW	Innocent Emeghara	27 May 1989 (aged 23)	1	0	(French Football Federation) Lorient
8	DF	Amir Abrashi	27 March 1990 (aged 22)	1	0	(Swiss Football Association) Grasshopper
9	DF	Fabian Frei	8 January 1989 (aged 23)	1	0	(Swiss Football Association) Basel
10	MF	Pajtim Kasami	2 June 1992 (aged 20)	1	0	(The Football Association) Fulham
11	FW	Admir Mehmedi	16 March 1991 (aged 21)	1	0	(Ukrainian Association of Football) Dynamo Kyiv
12	FW	Josip Drmić	8 August 1992 (aged 19)	1	0	(Swiss Football Association) Zürich
13	DF	Ricardo Rodriguez	25 August 1992 (aged 19)	1	0	(German Football Association) VfL Wolfsburg
14	FW	Steven Zuber	17 August 1991 (aged 20)	1	0	(Swiss Football Association) Grasshopper
15	DF	Timm Klose*	9 May 1988 (aged 24)	1	0	(German Football Association) 1. FC Nürnberg
16	DF	Fabian Schär	20 December 1991 (aged 20)	1	0	(Swiss Football Association) Basel
17	DF	Michel Morganella	17 May 1989 (aged 23)	1	0	(Italian Football Federation) Palermo
18	GK	Benjamin Siegrist	31 January 1992 (aged 20)	0	0	(The Football Association) Aston Villa

* Over-aged player.

== Group C ==
=== Belarus ===
The following is the Belarus squad in the men's football tournament of the 2012 Summer Olympics.

Coach: Georgi Kondratiev

No.	Pos.	Player	Date of birth (age)	Caps	Goals	2012 club
1	GK	Alyaksandr Hutar	18 April 1989 (aged 23)			(Football Federation of Belarus) BATE Borisov
2	MF	Stanislaw Drahun* (c)	4 June 1988 (aged 24)			(Football Federation of Belarus) Dinamo Minsk
3	DF	Ihar Kuzmyanok	6 July 1990 (aged 22)			(Football Federation of Belarus) Gomel
4	DF	Syarhey Palitsevich	9 April 1990 (aged 22)			(Football Federation of Belarus) Dinamo Minsk
5	MF	Dzmitry Baha	4 January 1990 (aged 22)			(Football Federation of Belarus) BATE Borisov
6	DF	Alyaksey Hawrylovich	5 January 1990 (aged 22)			(Football Federation of Belarus) Naftan Novopolotsk
7	DF	Maksim Vitus	February 11, 1989 (aged 23)			(Football Federation of Belarus) Neman Grodno
8	FW	Sergei Kornilenko*	14 June 1983 (aged 29)			(Russian Football Union) Krylia Sovetov
9	FW	Uladzimir Khvashchynski	10 May 1990 (aged 22)			(Football Federation of Belarus) Brest
10	MF	Renan Bressan*	3 November 1988 (aged 23)			(Football Federation of Belarus) BATE Borisov
11	FW	Andrey Varankow	8 February 1989 (aged 23)			(Football Federation of Belarus) Neman Grodno
12	DF	Alyaksey Kazlow	11 July 1989 (aged 23)			(Football Federation of Belarus) Torpedo Zhodino
13	MF	Illya Aleksiyevich	10 February 1991 (aged 21)			(Football Federation of Belarus) BATE Borisov
14	FW	Yahor Zubovich	1 June 1989 (aged 23)			(Football Federation of Belarus) Naftan Novopolotsk
15	MF	Artsyom Salavey	1 November 1990 (aged 21)			(Football Federation of Belarus) Torpedo Zhodino
16	MF	Mikhail Gordeichuk	23 October 1989 (aged 22)			(Football Federation of Belarus) Belshina Bobruisk
17	DF	Dzyanis Palyakow	17 April 1991 (aged 21)			(Football Federation of Belarus) BATE Borisov
18	GK	Andrey Shcharbakow	31 January 1991 (aged 21)			(Football Federation of Belarus) BATE Borisov
19	FW	Maksim Skavysh	13 November 1989 (aged 22)			(Football Federation of Belarus) Belshina Bobruisk

* Over-aged player.

=== Brazil ===
The following is the Brazil squad in the men's football tournament of the 2012 Summer Olympics.

Coach: Mano Menezes

No.	Pos.	Player	Date of birth (age)	Caps	Goals	2012 club
1	GK	Gabriel	27 September 1992 (aged 19)	0	0	(Italian Football Federation) Milan
2	DF	Rafael	9 July 1990 (aged 22)	0	0	(The Football Association) Manchester United
3	DF	Thiago Silva* (c)	22 September 1984 (aged 27)	2	0	(French Football Federation) Paris Saint-Germain
4	DF	Juan Jesus	10 June 1991 (aged 21)	0	0	(Italian Football Federation) Internazionale
5	MF	Sandro	15 March 1989 (aged 23)	0	0	(The Football Association) Tottenham Hotspur
6	DF	Marcelo*	12 May 1988 (aged 24)	6	1	(Royal Spanish Football Federation) Real Madrid
7	FW	Lucas Moura	13 August 1992 (aged 19)	0	0	(Brazilian Football Confederation) São Paulo
8	MF	Rômulo	19 September 1990 (aged 21)	0	0	(Russian Football Union) Spartak Moscow
9	FW	Leandro Damião	22 July 1989 (aged 23)	0	0	(Brazilian Football Confederation) Internacional
10	MF	Oscar	9 September 1991 (aged 20)	0	0	(The Football Association) Chelsea
11	FW	Neymar	5 February 1992 (aged 20)	0	0	(Brazilian Football Confederation) Santos
12	FW	Hulk*	25 July 1986 (aged 26)	0	0	(Portuguese Football Federation) Porto
13	DF	Bruno Uvini	3 June 1991 (aged 21)	0	0	(Brazilian Football Confederation) São Paulo
14	DF	Danilo	15 July 1991 (aged 21)	0	0	(Portuguese Football Federation) Porto
15	DF	Alex Sandro	26 January 1991 (aged 21)	0	0	(Portuguese Football Federation) Porto
16	MF	Ganso	12 October 1989 (aged 22)	0	0	(Brazilian Football Confederation) Santos
17	FW	Alexandre Pato	2 September 1989 (aged 22)	4	1	(Italian Football Federation) Milan
18	GK	Neto	19 July 1989 (aged 23)	0	0	(Italian Football Federation) Fiorentina

* Over-aged player.

=== Egypt ===
The following is the Egypt squad in the men's football tournament of the 2012 Summer Olympics.

Coach: Hany Ramzy

No.	Pos.	Player	Date of birth (age)	Caps	Goals	2012 club
1	GK	Ahmed El Shenawy	14 May 1991 (aged 21)	7	0	(Egyptian Football Association) Zamalek
2	DF	Mahmoud Alaa El-Din	1 January 1991 (aged 21)	1	0	(Egyptian Football Association) Haras El-Hodood
3	DF	Ali Fathy	2 January 1992 (aged 20)	9	0	(Egyptian Football Association) Arab Contractors
4	DF	Omar Gaber	30 January 1992 (aged 20)	2	0	(Egyptian Football Association) Zamalek
5	MF	Mohamed Aboutrika* (c)	7 November 1978 (aged 33)	88	32	(Egyptian Football Association) Al Ahly
6	DF	Ahmed Hegazi	25 January 1991 (aged 21)	12	0	(Italian Football Federation) Fiorentina
7	DF	Ahmed Fathy*	10 November 1984 (aged 27)	86	3	(Egyptian Football Association) Al Ahly
8	MF	Shehab El-Din Ahmed	22 August 1990 (aged 21)	0	0	(Egyptian Football Association) Al Ahly
9	FW	Marwan Mohsen	26 February 1989 (aged 23)	4	3	(Egyptian Football Association) Petrojet
10	FW	Emad Motaeb*	20 February 1983 (aged 29)	67	26	(Egyptian Football Association) Al Ahly
11	FW	Mohamed Salah	15 June 1992 (aged 20)	14	8	(Swiss Football Association) Basel
12	DF	Islam Ramadan	1 November 1990 (aged 21)	4	0	(Egyptian Football Association) Haras El-Hodood
13	MF	Saleh Gomaa	1 August 1993 (aged 18)	2	0	(Egyptian Football Association) ENPPI
14	MF	Hossam Hassan	30 April 1989 (aged 23)	1	0	(Egyptian Football Association) Al-Masry
15	DF	Saad Samir	1 April 1989 (aged 23)	0	0	(Egyptian Football Association) Al Ahly
16	FW	Ahmed Magdi	9 December 1989 (aged 22)	2	0	(Egyptian Football Association) Ghazl El Mehalla
17	MF	Mohamed Elneny	11 July 1992 (aged 20)	14	0	(Egyptian Football Association) Arab Contractors
18	GK	Mohamed Bassam	25 December 1990 (aged 21)	2	0	(Egyptian Football Association) El-Gaish

*Indicates that player was born prior to 1 January 1989. According to FIFA regulations, only three such players are permitted on an Olympic squad.

=== New Zealand ===
The following is the New Zealand roster in the men's football tournament of the 2012 Summer Olympics.

Coach: (United Kingdom) Neil Emblen

No.	Pos.	Player	Date of birth (age)	Caps	Goals	2012 club
1	GK	Jake Gleeson	26 June 1990 (aged 22)	3	0	(United States Soccer Federation) Portland Timbers
2	DF	Tim Payne	10 January 1994 (aged 18)	0	0	(The Football Association) Blackburn Rovers
3	DF	Ian Hogg	15 December 1989 (aged 22)	9	0	(New Zealand Football) Auckland City
4	DF	Tim Myers	17 September 1990 (aged 21)	2	0	(New Zealand Football) Waitakere United
5	DF	Tommy Smith	31 March 1990 (aged 22)	0	0	(The Football Association) Ipswich Town
6	DF	Ryan Nelsen* (c)	18 October 1977 (aged 34)	2	0	(The Football Association) Queens Park Rangers
7	FW	Kosta Barbarouses	19 February 1990 (aged 22)	5	4	(Hellenic Football Federation) Panathinaikos
8	MF	Michael McGlinchey*	7 January 1987 (aged 25)	0	0	(Football Australia) Central Coast Mariners
9	FW	Shane Smeltz*	29 September 1981 (aged 30)	5	7	(Football Australia) Perth Glory
10	FW	Chris Wood	7 December 1991 (aged 20)	0	0	(The Football Association) West Bromwich Albion
11	MF	Marco Rojas	5 November 1991 (aged 20)	0	0	(Football Australia) Melbourne Victory
12	DF	Adam Thomas	1 April 1992 (aged 20)	4	0	(New Zealand Football) Waikato
13	MF	Alex Feneridis	13 November 1989 (aged 22)	4	0	(New Zealand Football) Auckland City
14	DF	James Musa	1 April 1992 (aged 20)	4	2	(New Zealand Football) Team Wellington
15	MF	Cameron Howieson	22 December 1994 (aged 17)	0	0	(The Football Association) Burnley
16	FW	Dakota Lucas	26 June 1991 (aged 21)	4	0	(Football Australia) Sunshine Coast
17	MF	Adam McGeorge	30 March 1989 (aged 23)	3	0	(New Zealand Football) Auckland City
18	GK	Michael O'Keeffe	9 August 1990 (aged 21)	1	0	(United States Soccer Federation) Fairfield University

* Over-aged player.

== Group D ==
=== Honduras ===
The following is the Honduras squad in the men's football tournament of the 2012 Summer Olympics.

Coach: (Colombia) Luis Fernando Suárez

No.	Pos.	Player	Date of birth (age)	Caps	Goals	2012 club
1	GK	José Mendoza	21 July 1989 (aged 23)	6	0	(National Autonomous Federation of Football of Honduras) Platense
2	DF	Wilmer Crisanto	24 June 1989 (aged 23)	5	0	(National Autonomous Federation of Football of Honduras) Victoria
3	DF	Maynor Figueroa*	2 May 1983 (aged 29)	8	0	(The Football Association) Wigan Athletic
4	DF	Hilder Colón	6 April 1989 (aged 23)	6	0	(National Autonomous Federation of Football of Honduras) Real España
5	DF	José Velásquez	8 December 1989 (aged 22)	1	0	(National Autonomous Federation of Football of Honduras) Victoria
6	MF	Arnold Peralta	29 March 1989 (aged 23)	6	0	(National Autonomous Federation of Football of Honduras) Vida
7	MF	Mario Martínez	30 July 1989 (aged 22)	7	2	(National Autonomous Federation of Football of Honduras) Real España
8	MF	Alfredo Mejía	3 April 1990 (aged 22)	6	0	(National Autonomous Federation of Football of Honduras) Motagua
9	FW	Anthony Lozano	25 April 1993 (aged 19)	4	2	(Royal Spanish Football Federation) Valencia B
10	MF	Alexander López	5 June 1992 (aged 20)	6	1	(National Autonomous Federation of Football of Honduras) Olimpia
11	FW	Jerry Bengtson*	8 April 1987 (aged 25)	0	0	(United States Soccer Federation) New England Revolution
12	DF	Orlin Peralta	12 February 1990 (aged 22)	6	0	(National Autonomous Federation of Football of Honduras) Vida
13	FW	Eddie Hernández	27 February 1991 (aged 21)	6	3	(National Autonomous Federation of Football of Honduras) Platense
14	MF	Andy Najar	16 March 1993 (aged 19)	4	0	(United States Soccer Federation) D.C. United
15	MF	Roger Espinoza*	25 October 1986 (aged 25)	0	0	(United States Soccer Federation) Sporting Kansas City
16	DF	Johnny Leverón (c)	7 February 1990 (aged 22)	7	1	(National Autonomous Federation of Football of Honduras) Motagua
17	MF	Luis Garrido	5 November 1990 (aged 21)	4	0	(National Autonomous Federation of Football of Honduras) Olimpia
18	GK	Francisco Reyes	7 February 1990 (aged 22)	0	0	(National Autonomous Federation of Football of Honduras) Olimpia

* Over-aged player.

=== Japan ===
The following is the Japan roster in the men's football tournament of the 2012 Summer Olympics.

Coach: Takashi Sekizuka

No.	Pos.	Player	Date of birth (age)	Caps	Goals	2012 club
1	GK	Shuichi Gonda	3 March 1989 (aged 23)			(Japan Football Association) FC Tokyo
2	DF	Yuhei Tokunaga*	25 September 1983 (aged 28)			(Japan Football Association) FC Tokyo
3	MF	Takahiro Ogihara	5 October 1991 (aged 20)			(Japan Football Association) Cerezo Osaka
4	DF	Hiroki Sakai	12 April 1990 (aged 22)			(German Football Association) Hannover 96
5	DF	Maya Yoshida* (c)	24 August 1988 (aged 23)			(Royal Dutch Football Association) VVV-Venlo
6	DF	Taisuke Muramatsu	16 December 1989 (aged 22)			(Japan Football Association) Shimizu S-Pulse
7	FW	Yuki Otsu	24 March 1990 (aged 22)			(German Football Association) Borussia Mönchengladbach
8	DF	Kazuya Yamamura	2 December 1989 (aged 22)			(Japan Football Association) Kashima Antlers
9	FW	Kenyu Sugimoto	18 November 1992 (aged 19)			(Japan Football Association) Tokyo Verdy
10	MF	Keigo Higashi	20 July 1990 (aged 22)			(Japan Football Association) Omiya Ardija
11	FW	Kensuke Nagai	5 March 1989 (aged 23)			(Japan Football Association) Nagoya Grampus
12	DF	Gotoku Sakai	14 March 1991 (aged 21)			(German Football Association) VfB Stuttgart
13	DF	Daisuke Suzuki	29 January 1990 (aged 22)			(Japan Football Association) Albirex Niigata
14	MF	Takashi Usami	6 May 1992 (aged 20)			(German Football Association) TSG Hoffenheim
15	FW	Manabu Saito	4 April 1990 (aged 22)			(Japan Football Association) Yokohama F. Marinos
16	MF	Hotaru Yamaguchi	6 October 1990 (aged 21)			(Japan Football Association) Cerezo Osaka
17	MF	Hiroshi Kiyotake	12 November 1989 (aged 22)			(German Football Association) 1. FC Nürnberg
18	GK	Shunsuke Ando	10 August 1990 (aged 21)			(Japan Football Association) Kawasaki Frontale

* Over-aged player.

=== Morocco ===
The following is the Morocco squad in the men's football tournament of the 2012 Summer Olympics.

Coach: (Netherlands) Pim Verbeek

No.	Pos.	Player	Date of birth (age)	Caps	Goals	2012 club
1	GK	Mohamed Amsif	7 February 1989 (aged 23)			(German Football Association) FC Augsburg
2	DF	Abdelatif Noussir	20 February 1990 (aged 22)			(Royal Moroccan Football Federation) FUS Rabat
3	DF	Mohamed Abarhoun	3 May 1989 (aged 23)			(Royal Moroccan Football Federation) MA Tétouan
4	DF	Abdelhamid El Kaoutari	17 March 1990 (aged 22)			(French Football Federation) Montpellier
5	DF	Zakarya Bergdich	7 January 1989 (aged 23)			(French Football Federation) Lens
6	MF	Imad Najah	19 February 1991 (aged 21)			(Royal Dutch Football Association) PSV
7	FW	Zakaria Labyad	9 March 1993 (aged 19)			(Portuguese Football Federation) Sporting CP
8	MF	Driss Fettouhi (c)	30 September 1989 (aged 22)			(French Football Federation) Istres
9	FW	Nordin Amrabat*	31 March 1987 (aged 25)			(Turkish Football Federation) Galatasaray
10	MF	Abdelaziz Barrada	19 June 1989 (aged 23)			(Royal Spanish Football Federation) Getafe
11	FW	Soufiane Bidaoui	20 April 1990 (aged 22)			(Royal Belgian Football Association) Lierse
12	MF	Omar El Kaddouri	21 August 1990 (aged 21)			(Italian Football Federation) Brescia
13	DF	Zouhair Feddal	1 January 1989 (aged 23)			(Royal Spanish Football Federation) Espanyol B
14	MF	Houssine Kharja*	9 November 1982 (aged 29)			(Qatar Football Association) Al-Arabi
15	MF	Rayan Frikeche	9 October 1991 (aged 20)			(French Football Federation) Angers
16	DF	Yassine Jebbour	24 August 1991 (aged 20)			(French Football Federation) Rennes
17	FW	Soufian El Hassnaoui	28 October 1989 (aged 22)			(Royal Dutch Football Association) De Graafschap
18	GK	Yassine Bounou	5 April 1991 (aged 21)			(Royal Spanish Football Federation) Atlético Madrid B

* Over-aged player.

=== Spain ===
The following is the Spain squad in the men's football tournament of the 2012 Summer Olympics.

Coach: Luis Milla

No.	Pos.	Player	Date of birth (age)	Caps	Goals	2012 club
1	GK	David de Gea	7 November 1990 (aged 21)	2	0	(The Football Association) Manchester United
2	DF	César Azpilicueta	28 August 1989 (aged 22)	3	0	(French Football Federation) Marseille
3	DF	Álvaro Domínguez	15 May 1989 (aged 23)	3	0	(German Football Association) Borussia Mönchengladbach
4	MF	Javi Martínez* (c)	2 September 1988 (aged 23)	1	1	(Royal Spanish Football Federation) Athletic Bilbao
5	DF	Iñigo Martínez	17 May 1991 (aged 21)	2	0	(Royal Spanish Football Federation) Real Sociedad
6	DF	Jordi Alba	21 March 1989 (aged 23)	1	0	(Royal Spanish Football Federation) Barcelona
7	FW	Adrián López*	8 January 1988 (aged 24)	2	0	(Royal Spanish Football Federation) Atlético Madrid
8	FW	Iker Muniain	19 December 1992 (aged 19)	1	0	(Royal Spanish Football Federation) Athletic Bilbao
9	FW	Rodrigo	6 March 1991 (aged 21)	2	0	(Portuguese Football Federation) Benfica
10	MF	Juan Mata*	28 April 1988 (aged 24)	1	0	(The Football Association) Chelsea
11	MF	Koke	8 January 1992 (aged 20)	3	1	(Royal Spanish Football Federation) Atlético Madrid
12	DF	Martín Montoya	14 April 1991 (aged 21)	3	0	(Royal Spanish Football Federation) Barcelona
13	DF	Alberto Botía	27 January 1989 (aged 23)	2	0	(Royal Spanish Football Federation) Sporting Gijón
14	MF	Oriol Romeu	24 September 1991 (aged 20)	3	0	(The Football Association) Chelsea
15	MF	Isco	21 April 1992 (aged 20)	2	0	(Royal Spanish Football Federation) Málaga
16	FW	Cristian Tello	11 August 1991 (aged 20)	3	0	(Royal Spanish Football Federation) Barcelona
17	MF	Ander Herrera	14 August 1989 (aged 22)	2	0	(Royal Spanish Football Federation) Athletic Bilbao
18	GK	Diego Mariño	9 May 1990 (aged 22)	3	0	(Royal Spanish Football Federation) Villarreal

* Over-aged player.

== See also ==
- Football at the 2012 Summer Olympics – Women's team squads
