= Football at the 2012 Summer Olympics – Men's tournament – Group B =

Group B of the men's football tournament at the 2012 Summer Olympics took place from 26 July to 1 August 2012 in Cardiff's Millennium Stadium, Coventry's Ricoh Arena (referred to as City of Coventry Arena because of prohibitions around advertising), London's Wembley Stadium and Newcastle's St James' Park. The group contained Gabon, Mexico, South Korea and Switzerland.

== Teams ==
Draw position	Team	Pot	Confederation	Method of qualification	Date of qualification	Olympic appearance	Last appearance	Previous best performance
B1	Mexico	1	CONCACAF	2012 CONCACAF Men's Olympic Qualifying Championship winner	31 March 2012	10th	2004	Fourth place (1968)
B2	South Korea	3	AFC	AFC Round Three – Group A winner	22 February 2012	8th	2008	Bronze medal (2012)
B3	Gabon	4	CAF	2011 CAF U-23 Championship winner	10 December 2011	1st	–	–
B4	Switzerland	1	UEFA	2011 UEFA European Under-21 Championship runner-up	25 June 2011	2nd	1924	Bronze medal (1924)

== Standings ==
Pos	Team	Pld	W	D	L	GF	GA	GD	Pts	Qualification
1	Mexico	3	2	1	0	3	0	+3	7	Advance to knockout stage
2	South Korea	3	1	2	0	2	1	+1	5	Advance to knockout stage
3	Gabon	3	0	2	1	1	3	−2	2	
4	Switzerland	3	0	1	2	2	4	−2	1	

Source: FIFA
Rules for classification: Group stage tiebreakers

In the quarter-finals,

- The winner of Group B, Mexico, advanced to play the runner-up of Group A, Senegal.
- The runner-up of Group B, South Korea, advanced to play the winner of Group A, Great Britain.

== Matches ==
=== Mexico vs South Korea ===
26 July 2012
14:30

Mexico	0–0	South Korea
	Report

St James' Park, Newcastle
Attendance: 15,748
Referee: Slim Jedidi (Tunisia)

Mexico	South Korea

GK	1	José Corona (c)
DF	3	Carlos Salcido
DF	4	Hiram Mier
DF	5	Dárvin Chávez
DF	13	Diego Reyes
DF	15	Néstor Vidrio
MF	6	Héctor Herrera	(yellow card) 59'	(substituted off) 71'
MF	11	Javier Aquino
MF	16	Miguel Ponce
FW	8	Marco Fabián		(substituted off) 85'
FW	9	Oribe Peralta		(substituted off) 66'
Substitutions:
FW	10	Giovani dos Santos		(substituted on) 66'
MF	14	Jorge Enríquez		(substituted on) 71'
FW	12	Raúl Jiménez		(substituted on) 85'
Manager:
Luis Tena

GK	1	Jung Sung-Ryong
DF	3	Yun Suk-Young
DF	4	Kim Young-Gwon
DF	12	Hwang Seok-Ho
DF	14	Kim Chang-Soo
MF	6	Ki Sung-Yueng
MF	7	Kim Bo-Kyung
MF	11	Nam Tae-Hee	(substituted off) 87'
MF	13	Koo Ja-Cheol (c)
MF	15	Park Jong-Woo
FW	10	Park Chu-Young	(substituted off) 76'
Substitutions:
MF	8	Baek Sung-Dong	(substituted on) 76'
FW	9	Ji Dong-Won	(substituted on) 87'
Manager:
Hong Myung-Bo

Assistant referees:
Bechir Hassani (Tunisia)
Sherif Hassan (Egypt)
Fourth official:
Juan Soto (Venezuela)

=== Gabon vs Switzerland ===
26 July 2012
17:15

Gabon	1–1	Switzerland
Aubameyang 45'	Report	Mehmedi 5' (pen.)

St James' Park, Newcastle
Attendance: 15,748
Referee: Wilmar Roldán (Colombia)

Gabon	Switzerland

GK	1	Didier Ovono (c)
DF	2	Muller Dinda
DF	15	Henri Ndong
MF	4	Franck Engonga
MF	8	Alexander N'Doumbou
MF	10	Lévy Madinda
MF	12	Merlin Tandjigora	(yellow card) 49'
MF	13	Cédric Boussoughou
MF	17	Jerry Obiang
FW	7	Allen Nono	(yellow card) 18'	(substituted off) 74'
FW	9	Pierre Aubameyang
Substitutions:
MF	11	Axel Meye		(substituted on) 74'
Manager:
Claude Mbourounot

GK	1	Diego Benaglio (c)
RB	17	Michel Morganella
CB	16	Fabian Schär
CB	15	Timm Klose	(yellow card) 14'
LB	13	Ricardo Rodríguez
DM	2	Xavier Hochstrasser
RM	14	Steven Zuber		(substituted off) 68'
CM	9	Fabian Frei
CM	4	Oliver Buff	(yellow card) 32' (yellow-red card) 78'
LM	7	Innocent Emeghara		(substituted off) 84'
CF	11	Admir Mehmedi
Substitutions:
MF	10	Pajtim Kasami		(substituted on) 68'
MF	8	Amir Abrashi		(substituted on) 84'
Manager:
Pierluigi Tami

Assistant referees:
Humberto Clavijo (Colombia)
Eduardo Diaz (Colombia)
Fourth official:
Raúl Orosco (Bolivia)

=== Mexico vs Gabon ===
29 July 2012
14:30

Mexico	2–0	Gabon
Dos Santos 63', 90+2' (pen.)	Report

Ricoh Arena, Coventry
Attendance: 28,171
Referee: Ben Williams (Australia)

Mexico	Gabon

GK	1	José Corona (c)
DF	3	Carlos Salcido
DF	4	Hiram Mier
DF	5	Dárvin Chávez
DF	13	Diego Reyes	(yellow card) 41'
DF	15	Néstor Vidrio		(substituted off) 46'
MF	6	Héctor Herrera		(substituted off) 48'
MF	11	Javier Aquino
MF	16	Miguel Ponce
FW	8	Marco Fabián		(substituted off) 76'
FW	9	Oribe Peralta
Substitutions:
FW	10	Giovani dos Santos		(substituted on) 46'
MF	14	Jorge Enríquez		(substituted on) 48'
MF	7	Javier Cortés		(substituted on) 76'
Manager:
Luis Tena

GK	1	Didier Ovono (c)
DF	2	Muller Dinda	(yellow card) 43'	(substituted off) 85'
DF	15	Henri Ndong	(yellow card) 50' (yellow-red card) 90+1'
MF	4	Franck Engonga
MF	8	Alexander N'Doumbou		(substituted off) 70'
MF	10	Lévy Madinda
MF	12	Merlin Tandjigora
MF	13	Cédric Boussoughou
MF	17	Jerry Obiang		(substituted off) 83'
FW	9	Pierre Aubameyang
FW	11	Axel Meye
Substitutions:
FW	7	Allen Nono		(substituted on) 70'
MF	21	Samson Mbingui		(substituted on) 83'
DF	3	Stevy Nzambe		(substituted on) 85'
Manager:
Claude Mbourounot

Assistant referees:
Matthew Cream (Australia)
Hakan Anaz (Australia)
Fourth official:
Ravshan Irmatov (Uzbekistan)

=== South Korea vs Switzerland ===
29 July 2012
17:15

South Korea	2–1	Switzerland
Park Chu-young 57'; Kim Bo-kyung 64'	Report	Emeghara 60'

Ricoh Arena, Coventry
Attendance: 30,114
Referee: Raúl Orosco (Bolivia)

South Korea	Switzerland

GK	1	Jung Sung-Ryong
DF	3	Yun Suk-Young
DF	4	Kim Young-Gwon
DF	12	Hwang Seok-Ho
DF	14	Kim Chang-Soo
MF	6	Ki Sung-Yueng
MF	7	Kim Bo-Kyung
MF	11	Nam Tae-Hee		(substituted off) 61'
MF	13	Koo Ja-Cheol (c)
MF	15	Park Jong-Woo	(yellow card) 68'
FW	10	Park Chu-Young	(yellow card) 71'	(substituted off) 73'
Substitutions:
MF	8	Baek Sung-Dong		(substituted on) 61'
FW	9	Ji Dong-Won		(substituted on) 73'
Manager:
Hong Myung-Bo

GK	1	Diego Benaglio (c)
RB	17	Michel Morganella	(yellow card) 66'
CB	16	Fabian Schär
CB	15	Timm Klose
LB	13	Ricardo Rodríguez
DM	8	Amir Abrashi
RM	14	Steven Zuber		(substituted off) 71'
CM	9	Fabian Frei
CM	10	Pajtim Kasami	(yellow card) 1'	(substituted off) 85'
LM	7	Innocent Emeghara	(yellow card) 88'
CF	11	Admir Mehmedi
Substitutions:
FW	12	Josip Drmić	(yellow card) 90+2'	(substituted on) 71'
MF	6	Alain Wiss		(substituted on) 85'
Manager:
Pierluigi Tami

Assistant referees:
Efraín Castro (Bolivia)
Arol Valda (Bolivia)
Fourth official:
Bakary Gassama (Gambia)

=== Mexico vs Switzerland ===
1 August 2012
17:00

Mexico	1–0	Switzerland
Peralta 69'	Report

Millennium Stadium, Cardiff
Attendance: 50,000
Referee: Ravshan Irmatov (Uzbekistan)

Mexico	Switzerland

GK	1	José Corona (c)
DF	3	Carlos Salcido
DF	4	Hiram Mier
DF	5	Dárvin Chávez
DF	13	Diego Reyes
DF	15	Néstor Vidrio	(substituted off) 46'
MF	11	Javier Aquino
MF	14	Jorge Enríquez
FW	8	Marco Fabián	(substituted off) 79'
FW	9	Oribe Peralta
FW	10	Giovani dos Santos	(substituted off) 84'
Substitutions:
DF	2	Israel Jiménez	(substituted on) 46'
MF	16	Miguel Ponce	(substituted on) 79'
FW	12	Raúl Jiménez	(substituted on) 84'
Manager:
Luis Tena

GK	1	Diego Benaglio (c)
RB	3	Fabio Daprelà	(yellow card) 39'
CB	5	François Affolter	(yellow card) 45+1'
CB	15	Timm Klose
LB	13	Ricardo Rodríguez
DM	8	Amir Abrashi		(substituted off) 76'
RM	14	Steven Zuber		(substituted off) 61'
CM	9	Fabian Frei
CM	10	Pajtim Kasami		(substituted off) 85'
LM	7	Innocent Emeghara
CF	11	Admir Mehmedi
Substitutions:
FW	12	Josip Drmić		(substituted on) 61'
MF	6	Alain Wiss		(substituted on) 76'
MF	2	Xavier Hochstrasser	(yellow card) 87'	(substituted on) 85'
Manager:
Pierluigi Tami

Assistant referees:
Abdukhamidullo Rasulov (Uzbekistan)
Bakhadyr Kochkarov (Kyrgyzstan)
Fourth official:
Gianluca Rocchi (Italy)

=== South Korea vs Gabon ===
1 August 2012
17:00

South Korea	0–0	Gabon
	Report

Wembley Stadium, London
Attendance: 76,927
Referee: Pavel Královec (Czech Republic)

South Korea	Gabon

GK	1	Jung Sung-Ryong	(yellow card) 82'
DF	3	Yun Suk-Young
DF	4	Kim Young-Gwon
DF	12	Hwang Seok-Ho
DF	14	Kim Chang-Soo
MF	6	Ki Sung-Yueng
MF	7	Kim Bo-Kyung		(substituted off) 61'
MF	8	Baek Sung-Dong
MF	13	Koo Ja-Cheol (c)
MF	15	Park Jong-Woo		(substituted off) 46'
FW	10	Park Chu-Young		(substituted off) 80'
Substitutions:
MF	11	Nam Tae-Hee		(substituted on) 46'
MF	9	Ji Dong-Won		(substituted on) 61'
FW	17	Kim Hyun-Sung		(substituted on) 80'
Manager:
Hong Myung-Bo

GK	1	Didier Ovono (c)
DF	2	Muller Dinda
DF	3	Stevy Nzambe
DF	16	Emmanuel Ndong
MF	4	Franck Engonga
MF	10	Lévy Madinda		(substituted off) 66'
MF	12	Merlin Tandjigora		(substituted off) 10'
MF	13	Cédric Boussoughou
MF	17	Jerry Obiang
FW	9	Pierre Aubameyang
FW	11	Axel Meye		(substituted off) 76'
Substitutions:
MF	8	Alexander N'Doumbou	(yellow card) 61'	(substituted on) 10'
MF	21	Samson Mbingui		(substituted on) 66'
FW	7	Allen Nono		(substituted on) 76'
Manager:
Claude Mbourounot

Assistant referees:
Martin Wilczek (Czech Republic)
Antonín Kordula (Czech Republic)
Fourth official:
Mark Clattenburg (Great Britain)
