= Football at the 2012 Summer Olympics – Men's tournament final =

2012 Summer Olympic football final
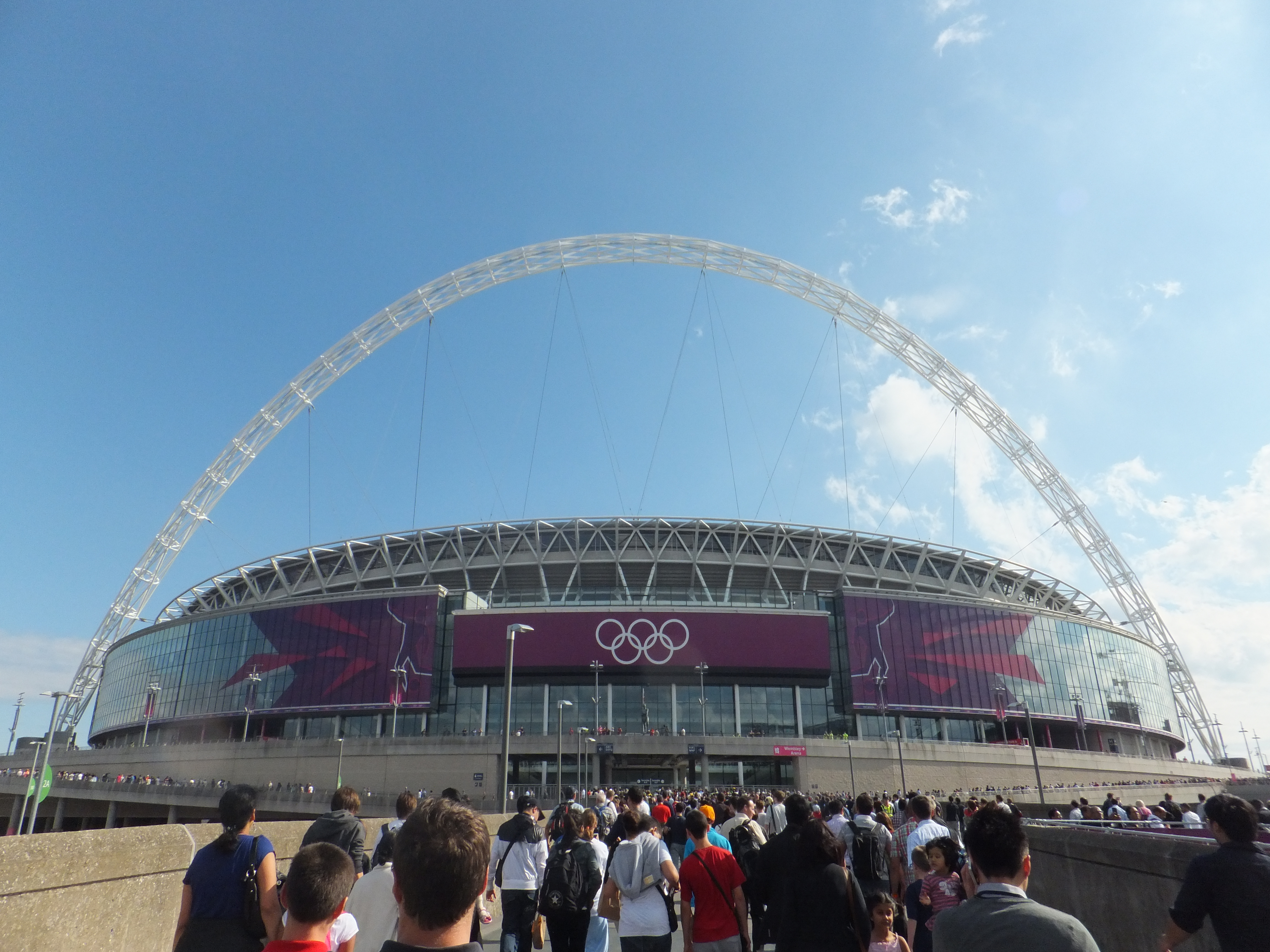
- Wembley Stadium hosted the final
- Event: Football at the 2012 Summer Olympics – Men's tournament
| Brazil | Mexico |
| 1 | 2 |
- Date: 11 August 2012
- Venue: Wembley Stadium, London
- Referee: Mark Clattenburg (Great Britain)
- Attendance: 86,162

Official Video Highlights

The 2012 Summer Olympic football final was a football match that took place at Wembley Stadium in London, United Kingdom on 11 August 2012 to determine the winner of the men's football tournament at the 2012 Summer Olympics. It was the 23rd final of the men's football tournament at the Summer Olympics, a quadrennial tournament contested for the men's under-23 national teams of FIFA to decide the Olympic champions.

In front of a crowd of 86,162, Mexico won their first Olympic gold medal in modality, beating Brazil, 2–1. It was Mexico's first major title since the 1999 FIFA Confederations Cup on home soil and their first Olympic gold medal in football, both wins involved Mexico's final meeting with Brazil in these events. As of the 2024 tournament, this was the most recent Olympic football final to end in regulation time (90 minutes).

== Venue ==
The final was played at Wembley Stadium in the Borough of Brent in London, United Kingdom.

The current Wembley Stadium opened in 2007 on the site of the original stadium, the demolition of which took place between 2002 and 2003. It is owned by The Football Association and serves as England's national football stadium.

The original stadium, formerly known as the Empire Stadium, opened in 1923 and served as the Olympic Stadium for the 1948 Summer Olympics as well as its football tournament, including the final. It then hosted matches at the 1966 FIFA World Cup, including the final, which saw hosts England beat West Germany 4–2 after extra time, and at UEFA Euro 1996, including the final, in which Germany defeated the Czech Republic 2–1 after extra time via the golden goal rule. Wembley also hosted every final of the FA Cup from the White Horse final of 1923 to 2000.

== Route to the final ==
Brazil
Round
Mexico
Opponent
Result
Group stage
Opponent
Result
Egypt
3–2
Match 1
South Korea
0–0
Belarus
3–1
Match 2
Gabon
2–0
New Zealand
3–0
Match 3
Switzerland
1–0
Group C winners

| Pos | Team | Pld | Pts |
|---|---|---|---|
| 1 | Brazil | 3 | 9 |
| 2 | Egypt | 3 | 4 |
| 3 | Belarus | 3 | 3 |
| 4 | New Zealand | 3 | 1 |

Source: FIFA
Final standings
Group B winners

| Pos | Team | Pld | Pts |
|---|---|---|---|
| 1 | Mexico | 3 | 7 |
| 2 | South Korea | 3 | 5 |
| 3 | Gabon | 3 | 2 |
| 4 | Switzerland | 3 | 1 |

Source: FIFA
Opponent
Result
Knockout stage
Opponent
Result
Honduras
3–2
Quarter-finals
Senegal
4–2
South Korea
3–0
Semi-finals
Japan
3–1

=== Brazil ===
The Brazil national under-23 football team led by Neymar advanced as favorite to the final against Mexico, after 5 victories in 5 matches. Brazil, under coach Mano Menezes, beat Egypt, Belarus and New Zealand in the preliminary round, Honduras in the quarter-finals and South Korea in the semi-finals. Before the Games, they beat Great Britain 2–0 in a friendly game.

=== Mexico ===
Mexico qualified by advancing to the final of the 2012 CONCACAF Men's Olympic Qualifying Championship, they topped Group B winning all their matches. They were drawn in Group B along with Gabon, South Korea and Switzerland. Mexico started with a 0–0 draw against South Korea. In their second match, Mexico came out with a 3–0 triumph over Gabon; with Giovani dos Santos netting the two goals. Mexico then confirmed top spot in the group by beating Switzerland 1–0, with a goal from Oribe Peralta in the 69th minute. In doing so, Mexico advance to the knockout stage for the first time since 1996.

In the quarter-finals played at Wembley Stadium, Mexico struggled against a very motivated and disciplined Senegal, who had finished second in Group A. Mexico went up 2–0, with Jorge Enríquez scoring in the 10th minute and Javier Aquino in the 62nd minute. Moussa Konaté came up with the first of Senegal. Ibrahima Baldé equalised seven minutes later, making it 2–2. Ihe first period of extra time, dos Santos at the 98th minute made it 3–2, in favor of Mexico. Héctor Herrera sealed the victory scoring at the 109th minute. In the semifinals, they came back from a 0-1 deficit to beat Japan 3-1 with goals from Peralta, Marco Fabián and Javier Cortés.

== Match ==
=== Summary ===
Mexico's Oribe Peralta opened the scoring in the first 29 seconds of the game, being assisted by Javier Aquino, making it the fastest goal of the Olympics and in any FIFA tournament final. Peralta scored the second goal in the 75th minute, assisted by a Fabián free-kick. Hulk discounted late.

=== Details ===
11 August 2012
15:00

| Brazil | 1–2 | Mexico |
|---|---|---|
| Hulk 90+1' | Report 1 Report 2 | Peralta 1', 75' |

Wembley Stadium, London
Attendance: 86,162
Referee: Mark Clattenburg (Great Britain)

| Brazil | Mexico |

| GK | 1 | Gabriel Vasconcelos |
| DF | 2 | Rafael | | (substituted off) 85' |
| DF | 3 | Thiago Silva (c) |
| DF | 4 | Juan Jesus |
| DF | 6 | Marcelo | (yellow card) 42' |
| DF | 15 | Alex Sandro | | (substituted off) 32' |
| MF | 5 | Sandro | | (substituted off) 71' |
| MF | 8 | Rômulo |
| MF | 10 | Oscar |
| FW | 9 | Leandro Damião |
| FW | 11 | Neymar |
Substitutions:
| FW | 12 | Hulk | | (substituted on) 32' |
| FW | 17 | Alexandre Pato | | (substituted on) 71' |
| FW | 7 | Lucas Moura | | (substituted on) 85' |
Manager:
Mano Menezes

| GK | 1 | José Corona (c) |
| DF | 2 | Israel Jiménez | (yellow card) 58' | (substituted off) 81' |
| DF | 3 | Carlos Salcido |
| DF | 4 | Hiram Mier |
| DF | 5 | Dárvin Chávez |
| DF | 13 | Diego Reyes | (yellow card) 46' |
| MF | 6 | Héctor Herrera |
| MF | 11 | Javier Aquino | | (substituted off) 57' |
| MF | 14 | Jorge Enríquez |
| FW | 8 | Marco Fabián |
| FW | 9 | Oribe Peralta | | (substituted off) 86' |
Substitutions:
| MF | 16 | Miguel Ponce | | (substituted on) 57' |
| DF | 15 | Néstor Vidrio | (yellow card) 89' | (substituted on) 81' |
| FW | 12 | Raúl Jiménez | | (substituted on) 86' |
Manager:
Luis Tena

Assistant referees:
Stephen Child (Great Britain)
Simon Beck (Great Britain)
Fourth official:
Bakary Gassama (Gambia)
