= Football at the 2012 Summer Olympics – Men's tournament – Group A =

Group A of the men's football tournament at the 2012 Summer Olympics took place from 26 July to 1 August 2012 in Cardiff's Millennium Stadium, Coventry's City of Coventry Stadium, London's Wembley Stadium and Manchester's Old Trafford. The group contained host nation Great Britain, Senegal, United Arab Emirates and Uruguay.

== Teams ==
Draw position	Team	Pot	Confederation	Method of qualification	Date of qualification	Olympic appearance	Last appearance	Previous best performance
A1	Great Britain (hosts)	1	UEFA	Hosts	6 July 2005	8th	1972	Gold medal (1900, 1908, 1912)
A2	Senegal	4	CAF	AFC–CAF play-off winners	23 April 2012	1st	–	–
A3	United Arab Emirates	3	AFC	AFC Round Three – Group B winners	5 February 2012	1st	–	–
A4	Uruguay	2	CONMEBOL	2011 South American U-20 Championship runners-up	9 February 2011	3rd	1928	Gold medal (1924, 1928)

== Standings ==
Pos	Team	Pld	W	D	L	GF	GA	GD	Pts	Qualification
1	Great Britain (H)	3	2	1	0	5	2	+3	7	Advance to knockout stage
2	Senegal	3	1	2	0	4	2	+2	5	Advance to knockout stage
3	Uruguay	3	1	0	2	2	4	−2	3	
4	United Arab Emirates	3	0	1	2	3	6	−3	1	

Source: FIFA
Rules for classification: Group stage tiebreakers
(H) Hosts

In the quarter-finals,

- The winner of Group A, Great Britain, advanced to play the runner-up of Group B, South Korea.
- The runner-up of Group A, Senegal, advanced to play the winner of Group B, Mexico.

== Matches ==
=== United Arab Emirates vs Uruguay ===
26 July 2012
17:00

United Arab Emirates	1–2	Uruguay
Matar 23'	Report	Ramírez 42'; Lodeiro 56'

Old Trafford, Manchester
Attendance: 51,745
Referee: Peter O'Leary (New Zealand)

United Arab Emirates	Uruguay

GK	1	Ali Khasif
DF	3	Abdulaziz Hussain
DF	4	Mohamed Ahmed	(yellow card) 37'
DF	8	Hamdan Al Kamali
DF	14	Abdelaziz Sanqour
MF	5	Amer Abdulrahman
MF	13	Khamis Esmaeel
MF	15	Omar Abdulrahman
MF	16	Rashed Eisa		(substituted off) 73'
FW	10	Ismail Matar (c)		(substituted off) 60'
FW	11	Ahmed Khalil
Substitutions:
MF	7	Ismail Al Hammadi		(substituted on) 60'
MF	9	Ahmed Ali		(substituted on) 73'
Manager:
Mahdi Ali

GK	1	Martín Campaña
DF	2	Ramón Arias
DF	4	Sebastián Coates
DF	5	Emiliano Albín
DF	6	Alexis Rolín	(yellow card) 9'
DF	13	Matías Aguirregaray		(substituted off) 46'
MF	8	Maximiliano Calzada		(substituted off) 70'
MF	10	Gastón Ramírez		(substituted off) 81'
MF	17	Egidio Arévalo Ríos
FW	7	Edinson Cavani
FW	9	Luis Suárez (c)
Substitutions:
MF	14	Nicolás Lodeiro		(substituted on) 46'
MF	15	Diego Martín Rodríguez		(substituted on) 70'
MF	12	Jonathan Urretaviscaya		(substituted on) 81'
Manager:
Óscar Tabárez

Assistant referees:
Jan-Hendrik Hintz (New Zealand)
Ravinesh Kumar (New Zealand)
Fourth official:
Felix Brych (Germany)

=== Great Britain vs Senegal ===
26 July 2012
20:00

Great Britain	1–1	Senegal
Bellamy 20'	Report	Konaté 82'

Old Trafford, Manchester
Attendance: 72,176
Referee: Ravshan Irmatov (Uzbekistan)

Great Britain	Senegal

GK	1	Jack Butland
DF	2	Neil Taylor
DF	3	Ryan Bertrand
DF	4	Danny Rose
DF	5	Steven Caulker
DF	14	Micah Richards
MF	7	Tom Cleverley
MF	8	Joe Allen		(substituted off) 63'
MF	11	Ryan Giggs (c)
FW	9	Daniel Sturridge		(substituted off) 46'
FW	10	Craig Bellamy	(yellow card) 47'	(substituted off) 80'
Substitutions:
FW	17	Marvin Sordell		(substituted on) 46'
MF	15	Aaron Ramsey		(substituted on) 63'
MF	13	Jack Cork		(substituted on) 80'
Manager:
Stuart Pearce

GK	1	Ousmane Mané
DF	2	Saliou Ciss
DF	4	Abdoulaye Ba
DF	5	Papa Gueye	(yellow card) 86'
DF	6	Zargo Touré
DF	16	Pape Souaré	(yellow card) 36'	(substituted off) 88'
MF	10	Sadio Mané	(yellow card) 45'
MF	13	Mohamed Diamé (c)
MF	14	Idrissa Gueye		(substituted off) 42'
FW	7	Moussa Konaté
FW	12	Ibrahima Baldé		(substituted off) 65'
Substitutions:
MF	8	Cheikhou Kouyaté		(substituted on) 42'
FW	15	Magaye Gueye		(substituted on) 65'
FW	11	Kalidou Yéro		(substituted on) 88'
Manager:
Abdoukarime Diouf

Assistant referees:
Abdukhamidullo Rasulov (Uzbekistan)
Bakhadyr Kochkarov (Kyrgyzstan)
Fourth official:
Ben Williams (Australia)

=== Senegal vs Uruguay ===
29 July 2012
17:00

Senegal	2–0	Uruguay
Konaté 10', 37'	Report

Wembley Stadium, London
Attendance: 75,093
Referee: Felix Brych (Germany)

Senegal	Uruguay

GK	1	Ousmane Mané
DF	2	Saliou Ciss
DF	4	Abdoulaye Ba	(yellow card) 27' (red card) 30'
DF	5	Papa Gueye
DF	6	Zargo Touré
DF	16	Pape Souaré
MF	8	Cheikhou Kouyaté	(yellow card) 44'
MF	10	Sadio Mané
MF	13	Mohamed Diamé (c)	(yellow card) 46'
MF	17	Stéphane Badji	(yellow card) 61'	(substituted off) 66'
FW	7	Moussa Konaté		(substituted off) 83'
Substitutions:
DF	9	Kara Mbodj		(substituted on) 66'
FW	11	Kalidou Yéro		(substituted on) 83'
Manager:
Abdoukarime Diouf

GK	1	Martín Campaña
DF	2	Ramón Arias
DF	4	Sebastián Coates
DF	5	Emiliano Albín	(yellow card) 68'	(substituted off) 72'
DF	6	Alexis Rolín
MF	8	Maximiliano Calzada		(substituted off) 46'
MF	10	Gastón Ramírez	(yellow card) 64'
MF	14	Nicolás Lodeiro		(substituted off) 75'
MF	17	Egidio Arévalo Ríos
FW	7	Edinson Cavani
FW	9	Luis Suárez (c)
Substitutions:
FW	11	Abel Hernández		(substituted on) 46'
MF	12	Jonathan Urretaviscaya		(substituted on) 72'
FW	16	Tabaré Viudez		(substituted on) 75'
Manager:
Óscar Tabárez

Assistant referees:
Mark Borsch (Germany)
Stefan Lupp (Germany)
Fourth official:
Peter O'Leary (New Zealand)

=== Great Britain vs United Arab Emirates ===
29 July 2012
19:45

Great Britain	3–1	United Arab Emirates
Giggs 16'; Sinclair 73'; Sturridge 76'	Report	Eisa 60'

Wembley Stadium, London
Attendance: 85,137
Referee: Roberto García (Mexico)

Great Britain	United Arab Emirates

GK	1	Jack Butland
DF	2	Neil Taylor
DF	5	Steven Caulker
DF	12	James Tomkins
DF	14	Micah Richards
MF	7	Tom Cleverley
MF	8	Joe Allen
MF	11	Ryan Giggs (c)	(substituted off) 72'
MF	15	Aaron Ramsey
FW	10	Craig Bellamy	(substituted off) 83'
FW	17	Marvin Sordell	(substituted off) 46'
Substitutions:
FW	9	Daniel Sturridge	(substituted on) 46'
MF	16	Scott Sinclair	(substituted on) 72'
MF	13	Jack Cork	(substituted on) 83'
Manager:
Stuart Pearce

GK	1	Ali Khasif
DF	3	Abdulaziz Hussain		(substituted off) 51'
DF	4	Mohamed Ahmed
DF	8	Hamdan Al Kamali
DF	14	Abdelaziz Sanqour
MF	5	Amer Abdulrahman
MF	13	Khamis Esmaeel	(yellow card) 63'	(substituted off) 79'
MF	15	Omar Abdulrahman	(yellow card) 83'
MF	16	Rashed Eisa
FW	10	Ismail Matar (c)		(substituted off) 72'
FW	11	Ahmed Khalil
Substitutions:
DF	2	Saad Surour		(substituted on) 51'
MF	9	Ahmed Ali		(substituted on) 72'
MF	12	Habib Al Fardan		(substituted on) 79'
Manager:
Mahdi Ali

Assistant referees:
José Luis Camargo (Mexico)
Alberto Morín (Mexico)
Fourth official:
Mark Geiger (United States)

=== Senegal vs United Arab Emirates ===
1 August 2012
19:45

Senegal	1–1	United Arab Emirates
Konaté 49'	Report	Matar 21'

City of Coventry Stadium, Coventry
Attendance: 28,652
Referee: Svein Oddvar Moen (Norway)

Senegal	United Arab Emirates

GK	1	Ousmane Mané
DF	5	Papa Gueye
DF	6	Zargo Touré
DF	9	Kara Mbodj
DF	16	Pape Souaré
MF	8	Cheikhou Kouyaté
MF	10	Sadio Mané	(substituted off) 83'
MF	13	Mohamed Diamé (c)
MF	17	Stéphane Badji
FW	7	Moussa Konaté	(substituted off) 90+1'
FW	15	Magaye Gueye	(substituted off) 46'
Substitutions:
FW	12	Ibrahima Baldé	(substituted on) 46'
FW	11	Kalidou Yéro	(substituted on) 83'
MF	3	Ibrahima Seck	(substituted on) 90+1'
Manager:
Abdoukarime Diouf

GK	18	Khalid Eisa
DF	4	Mohamed Ahmed
DF	8	Hamdan Al Kamali
DF	14	Abdelaziz Sanqour
MF	5	Amer Abdulrahman
MF	13	Khamis Esmaeel
MF	15	Omar Abdulrahman	(yellow card) 74'
MF	16	Rashed Eisa		(substituted off) 65'
FW	10	Ismail Matar (c)		(substituted off) 89'
FW	11	Ahmed Khalil		(substituted off) 60'
FW	17	Mohamed Fawzi
Substitutions:
MF	7	Ismail Al Hammadi		(substituted on) 60'
FW	19	Ali Mabkhout		(substituted on) 65'
MF	12	Habib Al Fardan		(substituted on) 89'
Manager:
Mahdi Ali

Assistant referees:
Kim Haglund (Norway)
Frank Andas (Norway)
Fourth official:
Juan Soto (Venezuela)

=== Great Britain vs Uruguay ===
1 August 2012
19:45

Great Britain	1–0	Uruguay
Sturridge 45+1'	Report

Millennium Stadium, Cardiff
Attendance: 70,438
Referee: Yuichi Nishimura (Japan)

Great Britain	Uruguay

GK	1	Jack Butland
DF	2	Neil Taylor	(yellow card) 21'
DF	5	Steven Caulker
DF	14	Micah Richards
DF	3	Ryan Bertrand
MF	7	Tom Cleverley
MF	8	Joe Allen
MF	16	Scott Sinclair		(substituted off) 90+1'
MF	15	Aaron Ramsey	(yellow card) 90+2'
FW	9	Daniel Sturridge		(substituted off) 90+6'
FW	10	Craig Bellamy (c)		(substituted off) 78'
Substitutions:
DF	4	Danny Rose		(substituted on) 78'
MF	13	Jack Cork		(substituted on) 90+1'
DF	6	Craig Dawson		(substituted on) 90+6'
Manager:
Stuart Pearce

GK	1	Martín Campaña
DF	2	Ramón Arias	(yellow card) 83'
DF	4	Sebastián Coates	(yellow card) 51'
DF	6	Alexis Rolín
DF	13	Matías Aguirregaray
MF	10	Gastón Ramírez	(yellow card) 39'
MF	15	Diego Rodríguez
MF	17	Egidio Arévalo Ríos
FW	7	Edinson Cavani
FW	9	Luis Suárez (c)	(yellow card) 74'
FW	16	Tabaré Viudez		(substituted off) 58'
Substitutions:
MF	14	Nicolás Lodeiro	(yellow card) 83'	(substituted on) 58'
Manager:
Óscar Tabárez

Assistant referees:
Toru Sagara (Japan)
Toshiyuki Nagi (Japan)
Fourth official:
Peter O'Leary (New Zealand)
