= Kalidou =

Kalidou is a given name. Notable people with the name include:

- Kalidou Cissokho (born 1978), Senegalese footballer
- Kalidou Koulibaly (born 1991), Senegalese footballer
- Kalidou Sidibé (born 1999), French footballer
- Kalidou Yero (born 1991), Senegalese footballer
