= Football at the 2012 Summer Olympics – Men's tournament – Knockout stage =

== Qualified teams ==
Group	Winners	Runners-up
A	Great Britain	Senegal
B	Mexico	South Korea
C	Brazil	Egypt
D	Japan	Honduras

== Bracket ==
Quarter-finals
4 August – Cardiff
Great Britain	1 (4)
South Korea (p)	1 (5)
4 August – Newcastle
Brazil	3
Honduras	2
4 August – London
Mexico (a.e.t.)	4
Senegal	2
4 August – Manchester
Japan	3
Egypt	0

Semi-finals
7 August – Manchester
South Korea	0
Brazil	3
7 August – London
Mexico	3
Japan	1

Gold medal match
11 August – London
Brazil	1
Mexico	2
Bronze medal match
10 August – Cardiff
South Korea	2
Japan	0

== Quarter-finals ==
=== Japan vs Egypt ===
4 August 2012
12:00

Japan	3–0	Egypt
Nagai 14'; Yoshida 78'; Ōtsu 83'	Report

Old Trafford, Manchester
Attendance: 70,772
Referee: Mark Geiger (United States)

Japan	Egypt

GK	1	Shūichi Gonda
RB	4	Hiroki Sakai
CB	13	Daisuke Suzuki
CB	5	Maya Yoshida (c)
LB	2	Yūhei Tokunaga	(yellow card) 43'
CM	16	Hotaru Yamaguchi
CM	3	Takahiro Ogihara
RW	17	Hiroshi Kiyotake		(substituted off) 84'
AM	10	Keigo Higashi		(substituted off) 72'
LW	7	Yūki Ōtsu
CF	11	Kensuke Nagai		(substituted off) 20'
Substitutions:
FW	15	Manabu Saitō		(substituted on) 20'
DF	12	Gōtoku Sakai		(substituted on) 72'
MF	14	Takashi Usami		(substituted on) 84'
Manager:
Takashi Sekizuka

GK	1	Ahmed El Shenawy
DF	6	Ahmed Hegazy
DF	7	Ahmed Fathy
DF	12	Islam Ramadan
DF	15	Saad Samir	(red card) 41'
MF	8	Shehab Ahmed		(substituted off) 45+1'
MF	14	Hossam Hassan
MF	17	Mohamed Elneny
FW	5	Mohamed Aboutrika (c)
FW	10	Emad Moteab		(substituted off) 74'
FW	11	Mohamed Salah		(substituted off) 58'
Substitutions:
DF	2	Mahmoud Alaa El-Din	(yellow card) 78'	(substituted on) 45+1'
DF	4	Omar Gaber		(substituted on) 58'
FW	9	Marwan Mohsen		(substituted on) 74'
Manager:
Hany Ramzy

Assistant referees:
Mark Hurd (United States)
Joe Fletcher (Canada)
Fourth official:
Peter O'Leary (New Zealand)

=== Mexico vs Senegal ===
4 August 2012
14:30

Mexico	4–2 (a.e.t.)	Senegal
Enríquez 10'; Aquino 62'; Dos Santos 98'; Herrera 109'	Report	Konaté 69'; Baldé 76'

Wembley Stadium, London
Attendance: 81,855
Referee: Mark Clattenburg (Great Britain)

Mexico	Senegal

GK	1	José Corona (c)
DF	2	Israel Jiménez	(yellow card) 73'
DF	3	Carlos Salcido
DF	4	Hiram Mier
DF	5	Dárvin Chávez
DF	13	Diego Reyes
MF	11	Javier Aquino		(substituted off) 75'
MF	14	Jorge Enríquez
FW	8	Marco Fabián		(substituted off) 100'
FW	9	Oribe Peralta		(substituted off) 107'
FW	10	Giovani dos Santos
Substitutions:
MF	6	Héctor Herrera	(yellow card) 102'	(substituted on) 75'
MF	16	Miguel Ponce		(substituted on) 100'
FW	12	Raúl Jiménez		(substituted on) 107'
Manager:
Luis Tena

GK	1	Ousmane Mané
DF	2	Saliou Ciss		(substituted off) 69'
DF	4	Abdoulaye Ba	(yellow card) 115'
DF	5	Papa Gueye
DF	6	Zargo Touré	(yellow card) 74'
DF	16	Pape Souaré	(yellow card) 82'
MF	8	Cheikhou Kouyaté
MF	10	Sadio Mané
MF	13	Mohamed Diamé (c)		(substituted off) 90+1'
FW	7	Moussa Konaté
FW	11	Kalidou Yéro	(yellow card) 50'	(substituted off) 60'
Substitutions:
FW	12	Ibrahima Baldé		(substituted on) 60'
FW	15	Magaye Gueye		(substituted on) 69'
DF	9	Kara Mbodj		(substituted on) 90+1'
Manager:
Abdoukarime Diouf

Assistant referees:
Stephen Child (Great Britain)
Simon Beck (Great Britain)
Fourth official:
Ben Williams (Australia)

=== Brazil vs Honduras ===
4 August 2012
17:00

Brazil	3–2	Honduras
Damião 38', 60'; Neymar 50' (pen.)	Report	Martínez 12'; Espinoza 48'

St James' Park, Newcastle
Attendance: 42,166
Referee: Felix Brych (Germany)

Brazil	Honduras

GK	1	Gabriel
DF	2	Rafael
DF	3	Thiago Silva (c)
DF	4	Juan Jesus
DF	6	Marcelo	(yellow card) 83'
DF	8	Rômulo	(yellow card) 66'
MF	5	Sandro	(yellow card) 23'	(substituted off) 42'
MF	10	Oscar
FW	9	Leandro Damião	(yellow card) 80'	(substituted off) 89'
FW	11	Neymar
FW	12	Hulk		(substituted off) 67'
Substitutions:
DF	14	Danilo		(substituted on) 42'
FW	7	Lucas Moura		(substituted on) 67'
FW	17	Alexandre Pato		(substituted on) 89'
Manager:
Mano Menezes

GK	1	José Mendoza
DF	2	Wilmer Crisanto	(yellow card) 32' (yellow-red card) 33'
DF	3	Maynor Figueroa	(yellow card) 78'
DF	5	José Velásquez	(yellow card) 16'
DF	16	Johnny Leverón (c)
MF	6	Arnold Peralta	(yellow card) 54'
MF	7	Mario Martínez
MF	12	Orlin Peralta		(substituted off) 59'
MF	15	Roger Espinoza	(yellow card) 25' (yellow-red card) 90'
MF	17	Luis Garrido		(substituted off) 73'
FW	11	Jerry Bengtson		(substituted off) 87'
Substitutions:
MF	9	Alfredo Mejía		(substituted on) 59'
MF	10	Alexander Lopez		(substituted on) 73'
FW	9	Anthony Lozano		(substituted on) 87'
Manager:
(Colombia) Luis Suárez

Assistant referees:
Mark Borsch (Germany)
Stefan Lupp (Germany)
Fourth official:
Slim Jedidi (Tunisia)

=== Great Britain vs South Korea ===
4 August 2012
19:30

Great Britain	1–1 (a.e.t.)	South Korea
Ramsey 36' (pen.)	Report	Ji Dong-won 29'
Penalties
Ramsey (penalty scored); Cleverley (penalty scored); Dawson (penalty scored); Giggs (penalty scored); Sturridge (penalty missed)	4–5	(penalty scored) Koo Ja-cheol; (penalty scored) Baek Sung-dong; (penalty scored) Hwang Seok-ho; (penalty scored) Park Jong-woo; (penalty scored) Ki Sung-yueng

Millennium Stadium, Cardiff
Attendance: 70,171
Referee: Wilmar Roldán (Colombia)

Great Britain	South Korea

GK	1	Jack Butland
DF	2	Neil Taylor
DF	3	Ryan Bertrand
DF	5	Steven Caulker
DF	14	Micah Richards		(substituted off) 60'
MF	7	Tom Cleverley
MF	8	Joe Allen	(yellow card) 71'
MF	15	Aaron Ramsey
MF	16	Scott Sinclair		(substituted off) 106'
FW	9	Daniel Sturridge	(yellow card) 34'
FW	10	Craig Bellamy (c)		(substituted off) 85'
Substitutions:
DF	6	Craig Dawson		(substituted on) 60'
MF	11	Ryan Giggs		(substituted on) 85'
DF	4	Danny Rose		(substituted on) 106'
Manager:
Stuart Pearce

GK	1	Jung Sung-ryong		(substituted off) 62'
DF	3	Yun Suk-young
DF	4	Kim Young-gwon	(yellow card) 34'
DF	12	Hwang Seok-ho
DF	14	Kim Chang-soo		(substituted off) 7'
MF	6	Ki Sung-yueng	(yellow card) 31'
MF	11	Nam Tae-hee
MF	13	Koo Ja-cheol (c)
MF	15	Park Jong-woo
FW	9	Ji Dong-won		(substituted off) 104'
FW	10	Park Chu-young
Substitutions:
DF	2	Oh Jae-suk	(yellow card) 34'	(substituted on) 7'
GK	18	Lee Bum-young	(yellow card) 120'	(substituted on) 62'
MF	8	Baek Sung-dong		(substituted on) 104'
Manager:
Hong Myung-bo

Assistant referees:
Humberto Clavijo (Colombia)
Eduardo Díaz (Colombia)
Fourth official:
Roberto García (Mexico)

== Semi-finals ==
=== Mexico vs Japan ===
7 August 2012
17:00

Mexico	3–1	Japan
Fabián 31'; Peralta 65'; Cortés 90+3'	Report	Ōtsu 12'

Wembley Stadium, London
Attendance: 82,372
Referee: Gianluca Rocchi (Italy)

Mexico	Japan

GK	1	José Corona (c)
DF	2	Israel Jiménez
DF	3	Carlos Salcido
DF	4	Hiram Mier
DF	5	Dárvin Chávez
DF	13	Diego Reyes
MF	11	Javier Aquino		(substituted off) 90'
MF	14	Jorge Enríquez
FW	8	Marco Fabián	(yellow card) 69'
FW	9	Oribe Peralta
FW	10	Giovani dos Santos		(substituted off) 46'
Substitutions:
FW	12	Raúl Jiménez		(substituted on) 46'
MF	7	Javier Cortés		(substituted on) 90'
Manager:
Luis Tena

GK	1	Shūichi Gonda
RB	4	Hiroki Sakai	(yellow card) 58'
CB	13	Daisuke Suzuki
CB	5	Maya Yoshida (c)
LB	2	Yūhei Tokunaga
CM	16	Hotaru Yamaguchi
CM	3	Takahiro Ogihara		(substituted off) 83'
RW	17	Hiroshi Kiyotake		(substituted off) 77'
AM	10	Keigo Higashi		(substituted off) 71'
LW	7	Yūki Ōtsu
CF	11	Kensuke Nagai
Substitutions:
FW	9	Kenyu Sugimoto		(substituted on) 71'
MF	14	Takashi Usami		(substituted on) 77'
FW	15	Manabu Saitō		(substituted on) 83'
Manager:
Takashi Sekizuka

Assistant referees:
Elenito Di Liberatore (Italy)
Gianluca Cariolato (Italy)
Fourth official:
Bakary Gassama (Gambia)

=== South Korea vs Brazil ===
7 August 2012
19:45

South Korea	0–3	Brazil
	Report	Rômulo 38'; Damião 57', 64'

Old Trafford, Manchester
Attendance: 69,389
Referee: Pavel Královec (Czech Republic)

South Korea	Brazil

GK	18	Lee Bum-young
DF	2	Oh Jae-suk
DF	3	Yun Suk-young
DF	4	Kim Young-gwon
DF	12	Hwang Seok-ho
MF	6	Ki Sung-yueng
MF	7	Kim Bo-kyung
MF	9	Ji Dong-won	(yellow card) 61'	(substituted off) 77'
MF	11	Nam Tae-hee
MF	13	Koo Ja-cheol (c)		(substituted off) 59'
FW	17	Kim Hyun-sung		(substituted off) 71'
Substitutions:
MF	16	Jung Woo-young		(substituted on) 59'
FW	10	Park Chu-young		(substituted on) 71'
MF	8	Baek Sung-dong		(substituted on) 77'
Manager:
Hong Myung-bo

GK	1	Gabriel
DF	2	Rafael
DF	3	Thiago Silva (c)
DF	4	Juan Jesus	(substituted off) 83'
DF	6	Marcelo	(substituted off) 76'
MF	5	Sandro
MF	8	Rômulo
MF	10	Oscar
MF	15	Alex Sandro
FW	9	Leandro Damião	(substituted off) 78'
FW	11	Neymar
Substitutions:
FW	12	Hulk	(substituted on) 76'
FW	17	Alexandre Pato	(substituted on) 78'
DF	13	Bruno Uvini	(substituted on) 83'
Manager:
Mano Menezes

Assistant referees:
Martin Wilczek (Czech Republic)
Antonín Kordula (Czech Republic)
Fourth official:
Mark Geiger (United States)

== Bronze medal match ==
=== South Korea vs Japan ===
10 August 2012
19:45

South Korea	2–0	Japan
Park Chu-young 38'; Koo Ja-cheol 57'	Report

Millennium Stadium, Cardiff
Attendance: 56,393
Referee: Ravshan Irmatov (Uzbekistan)

South Korea	Japan

GK	1	Jung Sung-ryong
DF	2	Oh Jae-suk	(yellow card) 26'
DF	3	Yun Suk-young
DF	4	Kim Young-gwon
DF	12	Hwang Seok-ho
MF	6	Ki Sung-yueng	(yellow card) 23'
MF	7	Kim Bo-kyung	(yellow card) 90+1'
MF	9	Ji Dong-won		(substituted off) 69'
MF	13	Koo Ja-cheol (c)	(yellow card) 35'	(substituted off) 90'
MF	15	Park Jong-woo
FW	10	Park Chu-young		(substituted off) 86'
Substitutions:
MF	11	Nam Tae-hee		(substituted on) 69'
FW	17	Kim Hyun-sung		(substituted on) 86'
DF	5	Kim Kee-hee		(substituted on) 90'
Manager:
Hong Myung-bo

GK	1	Shūichi Gonda
RB	4	Hiroki Sakai
CB	13	Daisuke Suzuki
CB	5	Maya Yoshida (c)
LB	2	Yūhei Tokunaga
CM	16	Hotaru Yamaguchi
CM	3	Takahiro Ogihara	(yellow card) 43'	(substituted off) 59'
RW	17	Hiroshi Kiyotake
AM	10	Keigo Higashi		(substituted off) 62'
LW	7	Yūki Ōtsu	(yellow card) 70'
CF	11	Kensuke Nagai		(substituted off) 71'
Substitutions:
DF	8	Kazuya Yamamura		(substituted on) 59'
FW	9	Kenyu Sugimoto	(yellow card) 88'	(substituted on) 62'
MF	14	Takashi Usami		(substituted on) 71'
Manager:
Takashi Sekizuka

Assistant referees:
Abdukhamidullo Rasulov (Uzbekistan)
Bakhadyr Kochkarov (Kyrgyzstan)
Fourth official:
Wilmar Roldán (Colombia)

== Gold medal match ==
=== Brazil vs Mexico ===
11 August 2012
15:00

Brazil	1–2	Mexico
Hulk 90+1'	Report 1 Report 2	Peralta 1', 75'

Wembley Stadium, London
Attendance: 86,162
Referee: Mark Clattenburg (Great Britain)

Brazil	Mexico

GK	1	Gabriel Vasconcelos
DF	2	Rafael		(substituted off) 85'
DF	3	Thiago Silva (c)
DF	4	Juan Jesus
DF	6	Marcelo	(yellow card) 42'
DF	15	Alex Sandro		(substituted off) 32'
MF	5	Sandro		(substituted off) 71'
MF	8	Rômulo
MF	10	Oscar
FW	9	Leandro Damião
FW	11	Neymar
Substitutions:
FW	12	Hulk		(substituted on) 32'
FW	17	Alexandre Pato		(substituted on) 71'
FW	7	Lucas Moura		(substituted on) 85'
Manager:
Mano Menezes

GK	1	José Corona (c)
DF	2	Israel Jiménez	(yellow card) 58'	(substituted off) 81'
DF	3	Carlos Salcido
DF	4	Hiram Mier
DF	5	Dárvin Chávez
DF	13	Diego Reyes	(yellow card) 46'
MF	6	Héctor Herrera
MF	11	Javier Aquino		(substituted off) 57'
MF	14	Jorge Enríquez
FW	8	Marco Fabián
FW	9	Oribe Peralta		(substituted off) 86'
Substitutions:
MF	16	Miguel Ponce		(substituted on) 57'
DF	15	Néstor Vidrio	(yellow card) 89'	(substituted on) 81'
FW	12	Raúl Jiménez		(substituted on) 86'
Manager:
Luis Tena

Assistant referees:
Stephen Child (Great Britain)
Simon Beck (Great Britain)
Fourth official:
Bakary Gassama (Gambia)
