= Football at the 2012 Summer Olympics =

Football at the Games of the XXX Olympiad
- Football pictogram for the 2012 Summer Olympics

Event details
- Games: 2012 Summer Olympics
- Host country: United Kingdom
- Dates: 25 July – 11 August 2012
- Venues: 6 (in 6 host cities)
- Competitors: 467 from 24 nations

Men's tournament
- Teams: 16 (from 6 confederations)
Medalists
Gold	Mexico
Silver	Brazil
Bronze	South Korea

Women's tournament
- Teams: 12 (from 6 confederations)
Medalists
Gold	United States
Silver	Japan
Bronze	Canada

Editions
- ← 2008 2016 →

The association football tournament at the 2012 Summer Olympics was held from 25 July to 11 August, and was the only sport to begin before the official opening day of the Olympic Games, two days before the opening ceremony. It was also the only sport to be held at multiple venues outside London (the host city of the Olympics), with Manchester, Glasgow, Newcastle, Coventry and Cardiff all hosting matches. The finals were played at Wembley Stadium. Associations affiliated with FIFA were invited to send their senior women's and men's under-23 national teams to participate; men's teams were allowed to augment their squads with three players over the age of 23. Five hundred and four football players competed for two sets of gold medals.

For these games, the men competed in a 16-team tournament and the women in a 12-team tournament. The draw for the tournament took place on 24 April 2012.

== Venues ==
There were six stadiums that hosted matches: The stadiums represent London itself and South East England, the English Midlands, North West England and North East England in England, as well as Scotland and Wales.

London	Location of the host cities of the football at the 2012 Summer Olympics.	Manchester
Wembley Stadium	Location of the host cities of the football at the 2012 Summer Olympics.	Old Trafford
Capacity: 90,000	Location of the host cities of the football at the 2012 Summer Olympics.	Capacity: 76,212
Wembley 22 August 2007	Location of the host cities of the football at the 2012 Summer Olympics.	20 August 2006
Cardiff	Location of the host cities of the football at the 2012 Summer Olympics.	Newcastle upon Tyne
Millennium Stadium	Location of the host cities of the football at the 2012 Summer Olympics.	St. James' Park
Capacity: 74,500	Location of the host cities of the football at the 2012 Summer Olympics.	Capacity: 52,387
5 February 2009	Location of the host cities of the football at the 2012 Summer Olympics.	21 August 2008
Glasgow	Location of the host cities of the football at the 2012 Summer Olympics.	Coventry
Hampden Park	Location of the host cities of the football at the 2012 Summer Olympics.	Ricoh Arena
Capacity: 52,103	Location of the host cities of the football at the 2012 Summer Olympics.	Capacity: 32,500
18 July 2004	Location of the host cities of the football at the 2012 Summer Olympics.	

NOTE: The Ricoh Arena was known as the City of Coventry Stadium due to the no-commercialisation policy.

== Competition schedule ==
GS	Group stage	QF	Quarter-finals	SF	Semi-finals	B	Bronze medal match	F	Final

Event↓/Date →	Wed 25	Thu 26	Fri 27	Sat 28	Sun 29	Mon 30	Tue 31	Wed 1	Thu 2	Fri 3	Sat 4	Sun 5	Mon 6	Tue 7	Wed 8	Thu 9		Fri 10	Sat 11
Men		GS			GS			GS			QF			SF				B	F
Women	GS			GS			GS			QF			SF			B	F		

== Qualified nations ==
=== Men's tournament ===
Means of qualification	Date of completion	Venue^{1}	Berths	Qualified	Senior team FIFA Ranking^{2}
Host nation		–	1	Great Britain	4^{3}
AFC Preliminary Competition	29 March 2012	Various (home and away)	3	Japan; South Korea; United Arab Emirates	20; 28; 87
CAF Preliminary Competition	10 December 2011	Morocco	3	Gabon; Morocco; Egypt	45; 71; 42
CONCACAF Preliminary Competition	2 April 2012	United States	2	Mexico; Honduras	19; 63
CONMEBOL Preliminary Competition	12 February 2011	Peru	2	Brazil; Uruguay	11; 3
OFC Preliminary Competition	25 March 2012	New Zealand	1	New Zealand	95
UEFA Preliminary Competition	25 June 2011	Denmark	3	Spain; Switzerland; Belarus	1; 21; 77
AFC–CAF play-off	23 April 2012	(United Kingdom) Great Britain	1	Senegal	61
Total			16		

- ^1Locations are those of final tournaments; various qualification stages may precede matches at these specific venues.
- ^2Senior ranking shown for comparison only. This is an under-23 competition, which does not award ranking points for the FIFA World Rankings and neither takes it into consideration.
- ^3England's ranking.

=== Women's tournament ===
Means of qualification	Date of completion	Venue^{1}	Berths	Qualified	FIFA Ranking^{2}
Host nation		–	1	Great Britain	9^{3}
AFC Preliminary Competition	11 September 2011	China	2	Japan; North Korea	3; 8
CAF Preliminary Competition	22 October 2011	–	2	Cameroon; South Africa	50; 61
CONCACAF Preliminary Competition	29 January 2012	Canada	2	United States; Canada	1; 7
CONMEBOL Preliminary Competition	21 November 2010	Ecuador	2	Brazil; Colombia	5; 28
OFC Preliminary Competition	4 April 2012	–	1	New Zealand	23
(UEFA) 2011 FIFA Women's World Cup	17 July 2011	Germany	2	Sweden; France	4; 6
Total			12		

- ^1Locations are those of final tournaments; various qualification stages may precede matches at these specific venues.
- ^2England's ranking.

=== United Kingdom/Great Britain teams ===
A men's football team representing Great Britain competed in the Olympics until 1972, albeit failing to qualify for the main tournament after 1960. After the Football Association abolished the distinction between amateurs and professionals, a ruling that came into force in 1974, Great Britain did not subsequently attempt to qualify in football, although after the rules on Olympic eligibility were relaxed in 1984, they would have been permitted to do so.

On 24 August 2008, British Prime Minister Gordon Brown suggested that the presence of a GB team at the 2012 games was "vital". He said that he had approached Manchester United manager Alex Ferguson to coach such a team. The Scottish, Welsh and Northern Irish football associations opposed such a move in case it would affect their status within the governing body of football, FIFA.

On 29 May 2009, after last-ditch talks prompted by a FIFA deadline to settle the row, the four associations sent a letter to FIFA stating that while the Scottish, Welsh and Northern Irish associations would not participate in a unified UK men's or women's teams at the Olympic Games, they would not prevent England from fielding teams under that banner.

However, Britain's FIFA Vice-president Jim Boyce stated that Gareth Bale, Aaron Ramsey, Craig Bellamy, Charlie Adam and other non-English players would have the legal right to be considered for Team GB at the London 2012 Olympics. The deal among the four "home nations" was challenged by the British Olympic Association. Boyce said there was no legal restriction as to why a player from Wales, Scotland or Northern Ireland could be stopped from playing.

Ultimately, five Welsh players were included in the 2012 Great Britain Olympic football squad, with Ryan Giggs – included as one of the three players over the age of 23 permitted – selected as team captain. Giggs would score during the tournament, in a 3–1 defeat of the United Arab Emirates at Wembley. None of the Great Britain men's football squad came from Scotland or Northern Ireland.

== Tie breakers ==
This tournament differs from other modern major international football tournaments in that head-to-head records is not the primary way to break ties.

The ranking of the teams in each group shall be determined as follows:

1. greatest number of points obtained in all group matches;
2. goal difference in all group matches;
3. greatest number of goals scored in all group matches;
4. greatest number of points obtained in all group matches between the teams concerned;
5. goal difference resulting from all group matches between the teams concerned;
6. greatest number of goals scored in all group matches between the teams concerned;
7. drawing of lots by the FIFA Organising Committee.

== Men's tournament ==
=== Group A ===
Pos	Team	Pld	W	D	L	GF	GA	GD	Pts	Qualification
1	Great Britain (H)	3	2	1	0	5	2	+3	7	Advance to knockout stage
2	Senegal	3	1	2	0	4	2	+2	5	Advance to knockout stage
3	Uruguay	3	1	0	2	2	4	−2	3	
4	United Arab Emirates	3	0	1	2	3	6	−3	1	

Source: FIFA
(H) Hosts

=== Group B ===
Pos	Team	Pld	W	D	L	GF	GA	GD	Pts	Qualification
1	Mexico	3	2	1	0	3	0	+3	7	Advance to knockout stage
2	South Korea	3	1	2	0	2	1	+1	5	Advance to knockout stage
3	Gabon	3	0	2	1	1	3	−2	2	
4	Switzerland	3	0	1	2	2	4	−2	1	

Source: FIFA

=== Group C ===
Pos	Team	Pld	W	D	L	GF	GA	GD	Pts	Qualification
1	Brazil	3	3	0	0	9	3	+6	9	Advance to knockout stage
2	Egypt	3	1	1	1	6	5	+1	4	Advance to knockout stage
3	Belarus	3	1	0	2	3	6	−3	3	
4	New Zealand	3	0	1	2	1	5	−4	1	

Source: FIFA

=== Group D ===
Pos	Team	Pld	W	D	L	GF	GA	GD	Pts	Qualification
1	Japan	3	2	1	0	2	0	+2	7	Advance to knockout stage
2	Honduras	3	1	2	0	3	2	+1	5	Advance to knockout stage
3	Morocco	3	0	2	1	2	3	−1	2	
4	Spain	3	0	1	2	0	2	−2	1	

Source: FIFA

=== Knockout stage ===
Quarter-finals
4 August – Cardiff
Great Britain	1 (4)
South Korea (p)	1 (5)
4 August – Newcastle
Brazil	3
Honduras	2
4 August – London
Mexico (a.e.t.)	4
Senegal	2
4 August – Manchester
Japan	3
Egypt	0

Semi-finals
7 August – Manchester
South Korea	0
Brazil	3
7 August – London
Mexico	3
Japan	1

Gold medal match
11 August – London
Brazil	1
Mexico	2
Bronze medal match
10 August – Cardiff
South Korea	2
Japan	0

=== Squad restrictions ===
The same restrictions used for recent Olympiads are applied, in which each squad is to consist of eighteen players, of which no more than three may be over the age of 23 before the beginning of the next year. In the case of the 2012 Summer Olympics, this restricts players born before 1 January 1989.

== Women's tournament ==
=== Group E ===
Pos	Team	Pld	W	D	L	GF	GA	GD	Pts	Qualification
1	Great Britain	3	3	0	0	5	0	+5	9	Qualified for the quarter-finals
2	Brazil	3	2	0	1	6	1	+5	6	Qualified for the quarter-finals
3	New Zealand	3	1	0	2	3	3	0	3	Qualified for the quarter-finals
4	Cameroon	3	0	0	3	1	11	−10	0	

Source: IOC

=== Group F ===
Pos	Team	Pld	W	D	L	GF	GA	GD	Pts	Qualification
1	Sweden	3	1	2	0	6	3	+3	5	Qualified for the quarter-finals
2	Japan	3	1	2	0	2	1	+1	5	Qualified for the quarter-finals
3	Canada	3	1	1	1	6	4	+2	4	Qualified for the quarter-finals
4	South Africa	3	0	1	2	1	7	−6	1	

Source: IOC

=== Group G ===
Pos	Team	Pld	W	D	L	GF	GA	GD	Pts	Qualification
1	United States	3	3	0	0	8	2	+6	9	Qualified for the quarter-finals
2	France	3	2	0	1	8	4	+4	6	Qualified for the quarter-finals
3	North Korea	3	1	0	2	2	6	−4	3	
4	Colombia	3	0	0	3	0	6	−6	0	

Source: IOC

=== Knockout stage ===
Quarter-finals
E1	Great Britain	0
F3	Canada	2
G1	United States	2
E3	New Zealand	0
F1	Sweden	1
G2	France	2
E2	Brazil	0
F2	Japan	2

Semi-finals
F3	Canada	3
G1	United States (aet)	4
G2	France	1
F2	Japan	2

Gold medal match
G1	United States	2
F2	Japan	1
Bronze medal match
F3	Canada	1
G2	France	0

=== Squad restrictions ===
There were no age restrictions in the women's tournament.

== Medal summary ==
=== Medal table ===
Rank	Nation	Gold	Silver	Bronze	Total
1	Mexico	1	0	0	1
1	United States	1	0	0	1
3	Brazil	0	1	0	1
3	Japan	0	1	0	1
5	Canada	0	0	1	1
5	South Korea	0	0	1	1
Totals (6 entries)		2	2	2	6

=== Medalists ===
Event	Gold	Silver	Bronze
Men	Mexico; Jesús Corona (captain); Israel Jiménez; Carlos Salcido; Hiram Mier; Dárvin Chávez; Héctor Herrera; Javier Cortés; Marco Fabián; Oribe Peralta; Giovani dos Santos; Javier Aquino; Raúl Jiménez; Diego Reyes; Jorge Enríquez; Néstor Vidrio; Miguel Ponce; Néstor Araujo; José Antonio Rodríguez	Brazil; Gabriel; Rafael; Thiago Silva (captain); Juan Jesus; Sandro; Marcelo; Lucas; Rômulo; Leandro Damião; Oscar; Neymar; Hulk; Bruno Uvini; Danilo; Alex Sandro; Ganso; Alexandre Pato; Neto	South Korea; Jung Sung-ryong; Oh Jae-suk; Yun Suk-young; Kim Young-gwon; Kim Kee-hee; Ki Sung-yueng; Kim Bo-kyung; Baek Sung-dong; Ji Dong-won; Park Chu-young; Nam Tae-hee; Hwang Seok-ho; Koo Ja-cheol (captain); Kim Chang-soo; Park Jong-woo; Jung Woo-young; Kim Hyun-sung; Lee Bum-young
Women	United States; Hope Solo; Heather Mitts; Christie Rampone (captain); Becky Sauerbrunn; Kelley O'Hara; Amy LePeilbet; Shannon Boxx; Amy Rodriguez; Heather O'Reilly; Carli Lloyd; Sydney Leroux; Lauren Cheney; Alex Morgan; Abby Wambach; Megan Rapinoe; Rachel Buehler; Tobin Heath; Nicole Barnhart	Japan; Miho Fukumoto; Yukari Kinga; Azusa Iwashimizu; Saki Kumagai; Aya Sameshima; Mizuho Sakaguchi; Kozue Ando; Aya Miyama (captain); Nahomi Kawasumi; Homare Sawa; Shinobu Ohno; Kyoko Yano; Karina Maruyama; Asuna Tanaka; Megumi Takase; Mana Iwabuchi; Yūki Ōgimi; Ayumi Kaihori	Canada; Karina LeBlanc; Chelsea Stewart; Carmelina Moscato; Robyn Gayle; Kaylyn Kyle; Rhian Wilkinson; Diana Matheson; Candace Chapman; Lauren Sesselmann; Desiree Scott; Christine Sinclair (captain); Sophie Schmidt; Melissa Tancredi; Kelly Parker; Jonelle Filigno; Brittany Timko; Erin McLeod; Marie-Ève Nault

== Notable events and controversies ==
=== South Korean political statements ===
After South Korea defeated Japan in the Bronze Medal match at Millennium Stadium in Cardiff on 10 August, South Korean player Park Jong-woo walked around the field holding a banner with a message written in Korean, "독도는 우리 땅!" (dokdo neun uri ttang lit. "Dokdo is our territory!). As both IOC and FIFA statutes prohibit any political statements being made by athletes at their respective sporting events, the IOC barred Park from the bronze medal ceremony and did not permit him to receive his medal. In addition, it asked FIFA to discipline Park, and stated that it may decide on further sanctions at a later date. FIFA failed to reach a conclusion on the case at a meeting at its Zürich headquarters held on 5 October, and the disciplinary committee discussed the case again on the following week, then failed to reach a verdict again. The case was heard again by the committee on 20 November, and FIFA decided on 3 December to suspend Park for two matches after he was considered to have breached the FIFA Disciplinary Code and the Regulations of the Olympic Football Tournaments. FIFA also imposed a warning on the Korea Football Association and reminded it of its obligation to properly instruct its players on all the pertinent rules and applicable regulations before the start of any competition, in order to avoid such incidents in the future. The Korea Football Association was warned that should incidents of such nature occur again in the future, the FIFA Disciplinary Committee may impose harsher sanctions on the Korea Football Association.

=== Iranian women's team dress code violations ===
Iran's women's team and three Jordanian players were banned during the second round of the Asian qualification tournament due to not adhering to FIFA dress code; the players were allowed to play while covering their head in the first round. FIFA banned the hijab in 2007, although FIFA now allows the hijab to be worn after overturning the 2007 decision in 2012.

=== Use of incorrect flag for North Korea ===
Following the South Korean flag being put on display, instead of the correct North Korean flag, on the stadium screen at Hampden Park when the teams were being announced before the Colombia versus North Korea women's match, the North Korea team protested against this action by refusing to take to the pitch. The kick-off was delayed by over an hour while the mistake was being corrected.

=== Canada–United States semi-final ===
During the semi-final match between Canada and the United States, a time-wasting call was made against the Canadian goalkeeper, Erin McLeod, when she held the ball longer than the allowed six seconds. This violation is called in international play and is intended to be used during instances of time-wasting. As a result, the American side was awarded an indirect free-kick in the box. On the ensuing play, Canada was penalized for a handball in the penalty box, with the American team being awarded a penalty kick, which Abby Wambach converted to tie the game at 3–3. The Americans went on to win the match in extra time, advancing to the gold medal game. After the match, Canada forward Christine Sinclair stated, "the ref decided the result before the game started." FIFA responded by stating that the refereeing decisions were correct and saying it was considering disciplinary action against Sinclair, but that any disciplinary action would be postponed until after the end of the tournament.

== See also ==
- Football 5-a-side at the 2012 Summer Paralympics
- Football 7-a-side at the 2012 Summer Paralympics
