= Switzerland national under-23 football team =

National U-23 association football team

Switzerland Olympic
- Nickname: Schweizer Nati
- Association: Swiss Football Association
- Confederation: UEFA (Europe)
- Head coach: Pierluigi Tami
- Captain: Diego Benaglio
First colours	Second colours

First international
- Switzerland 9–0 Lithuania (Paris, France; 25 May 1924)

Biggest win
- Liechtenstein 0–10 Switzerland (Triesen, Liechtenstein; 10 September 1986)

Biggest defeat
- Germany 4–0 Switzerland (Amsterdam, Netherlands; 28 May 1928)

Summer Olympics
- Appearances: 3 (first in 1924)
- Best result: Silver medalist (1924)

Olympic medal record

Men's Football
Silver medal – second place	1924 Paris	Team

The Switzerland national under-23 football team (also known as Switzerland Olympic, Switzerland U-23) represents Switzerland in international football competitions in the Olympic Games. The selection is limited to players under the age of 23. However, the Olympics allows for the addition of up to three overage players. The team is controlled by the Swiss Football Association (ASF/SFV). In three previous appearances, Switzerland have won one silver medal at the 1924 Olympics in Paris.

== Competitive record ==
=== Olympic Games ===
Olympic Games record
Year	Round	Position	Pld	W	D*	L	GF	GA	Squad
(Greece) 1896	No football tournament was held								
(France) 1900	Did not enter								
(United States) 1904	Did not enter								
(United Kingdom) 1908	Did not enter								
(Sweden) 1912	Did not enter								
(Belgium) 1920	withdrew								
(France) 1924	Silver medal	2nd	6	4	1	1	15	6	Squad
(Netherlands) 1928	Round of 16	13th	1	0	0	1	0	4	Squad
(United States) 1932	No football tournament was held								
(Nazi Germany) 1936	Did not enter								
(United Kingdom) 1948	Did not enter								
(Finland) 1952	Did not enter								
(Australia) 1956	Did not enter								
(Italy) 1960	Did not qualify								
(Japan) 1964	Did not qualify								
(Mexico) 1968	Did not qualify								
(West Germany) 1972	Did not qualify								
(Canada) 1976	Did not enter								
(Soviet Union) 1980	Did not enter								
(United States) 1984	Did not enter								
(South Korea) 1988	Did not qualify								
(Spain) 1992	Did not qualify								
(United States) 1996	Did not qualify								
(Australia) 2000	Did not qualify								
(Greece) 2004	Did not qualify								
(China) 2008	Did not qualify								
(United Kingdom) 2012	Group stage	13th	3	0	1	2	2	4	Squad
(Brazil) 2016	Did not qualify								
(Japan) 2020	Did not qualify								
(France) 2024	Did not qualify								
Total	Silver medal	4/25	10	4	2	4	17	14	—

*Denotes draws including knockout matches decided on penalty kicks.

=== UEFA European Under-23 Championship ===
Year	Round	GP	W	D	L	GS	GA
1972	Qualifying stage	2	0	0	2	0	3
1974	Did not enter						
1976	Did not enter						
Total	0/3	2	0	0	2	0	3

== Results and fixtures ==
=== 2012 Summer Olympics ===
==== Group stage ====
Pos	Team	Pld	W	D	L	GF	GA	GD	Pts	Qualification
1	Mexico	3	2	1	0	3	0	+3	7	Advance to knockout stage
2	South Korea	3	1	2	0	2	1	+1	5	Advance to knockout stage
3	Gabon	3	0	2	1	1	3	−2	2	
4	Switzerland	3	0	1	2	2	4	−2	1	

Source: FIFA
Rules for classification: Group stage tiebreakers
26 July 2012
17:15

Gabon	1–1	Switzerland
Aubameyang 45'	Report	Mehmedi 5' (pen.)

St James' Park, Newcastle
Attendance: 15,748
Referee: Wilmar Roldán (Colombia)

29 July 2012
17:15

South Korea	2–1	Switzerland
Park Chu-young 57'; Kim Bo-kyung 64'	Report	Emeghara 60'

Ricoh Arena, Coventry
Attendance: 30,114
Referee: Raúl Orosco (Bolivia)

1 August 2012
17:00

Mexico	1–0	Switzerland
Peralta 69'	Report

Millennium Stadium, Cardiff
Attendance: 50,000
Referee: Ravshan Irmatov (Uzbekistan)

== See also ==
- Switzerland national football team
- Switzerland national under-21 football team
- Switzerland national under-20 football team
- Switzerland national under-19 football team
- Switzerland national under-18 football team
- Switzerland national under-17 football team
- Switzerland national under-16 football team
