= Claude Albert Mbourounot =

Gabonese football manager (born 1961)

Personal information
- Date of birth: 22 June 1961 (age 65)
- Place of birth: Gabon

Managerial career
- Years: Team
- 1985–93: Petrosport
- 1993–00: Mbilinga FC
- 2003–05: Gabon
- 2011–13: Gabon U23

Claude Albert Mbourounot is a Gabonese football manager.

== Career ==
He is currently in charge of the Gabon national under-23 football team. In 2011, he led the under-23 side in winning the 2011 CAF U-23 Championship, thus qualifying Gabon for the 2012 Summer Olympics in London. It was the nation's first appearance.

Besides fulfilling his role as the under-23 coach, Mbourounot is also a technical director for the Gabonese Football Federation. Mbourounot had previously coached the Gabon senior team in 2003.

== Honours ==
Gabon U23

- CAF U-23 Championship: 2011
