= Didier Ovono =

Gabonese footballer (born 1983)

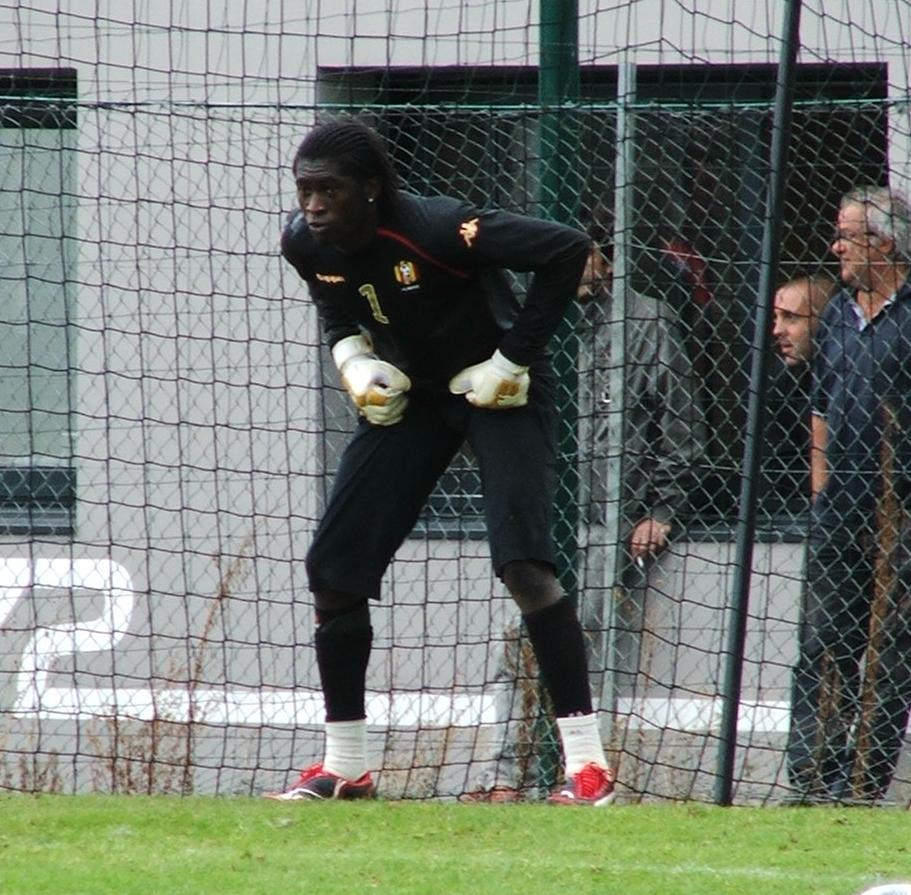
- Ovono with Le Mans in 2009

Personal information
- Full name: Didier Janvier Ovono Ebang
- Date of birth: 23 January 1983 (age 43)
- Place of birth: Port-Gentil, Gabon
- Height: 1.86 m (6 ft 1 in)
- Position: Goalkeeper

Senior career*
Years	Team	Apps	(Gls)
1999–2000	Pétro Sport Port-Gentil	?	(0)
2001–2003	AS Mangasport	?	(0)
2004	Sogéa FC	?	(0)
2005	Alianza FC	36	(0)
2006	Paços de Ferreira	0	(0)
2007–2009	Dinamo Tbilisi	49	(0)
2009–2012	Le Mans	81	(0)
2012	Le Mans II	2	(0)
2013	Sochaux	0	(0)
2013	Sochaux II	6	(0)
2013–2017	Oostende	89	(0)
2017–2019	Paris FC	1	(0)
2017–2019	Paris II FC	6	(0)
2021	Haguenau	0	(0)
2021–2022	Trélazé	0	(0)
2022–2023	Saumur	0	(0)
2022–2023	Saumur B		(0)

International career^{‡}
2003–2019	Gabon	112	(0)
2012	Gabon Olympic	3	(0)
- * Club domestic league appearances and goals as of 19:18, 21 September 2019 (UTC) ‡ National team caps and goals as of 22:14, 5 August 2019 (UTC)

Didier Janvier Ovono Ebang (born 23 January 1983) is a Gabonese professional footballer who plays as a goalkeeper.

== Club career ==
In 2008, Ovono won the Georgian League with Dinamo Tbilisi. On 22 June 2009, he moved from Dinamo Tbilisi to Le Mans in Ligue 1 where he was given a three-year contract until June 2012.

In February 2021 Ovono joined Championnat National 2 club FCSR Haguenau.

== International career ==
Ovono played at the 2010 African Cup of Nations for the Gabon national team, including a good performance and a clean sheet in Gabon's surprise opening victory over Cameroon.

In 2012, he played in all four national team matches at the 2012 Africa Cup of Nations, two of which were clean sheets. As a result, Gabon reached the quarterfinals.

He retired from the national team in May 2017. Later on, he came out of retirement to be the first Gabonese player to have 100 or more international appearances.

== Career statistics ==
=== International ===
As of matches played on 23 March 2019

Appearances and goals by national team and year
National team	Year	Apps	Goals
Gabon	2003	7	0
Gabon	2004	6	0
Gabon	2005	5	0
Gabon	2006	3	0
Gabon	2007	3	0
Gabon	2008	9	0
Gabon	2009	7	0
Gabon	2010	10	0
Gabon	2011	7	0
Gabon	2012	11	0
Gabon	2013	5	0
Gabon	2014	7	0
Gabon	2015	12	0
Gabon	2016	7	0
Gabon	2017	6	0
Gabon	2018	6	0
Gabon	2019	1	0
Total		112	0

== See also ==
- List of footballers with 100 or more caps
