= Cédric Boussoughou =

Gabonese footballer (born 1991)

Personal information
- Full name: Cédric Boussoughou Mabikou
- Date of birth: 20 July 1991 (age 35)
- Place of birth: Moanda, Gabon
- Position: Midfielder

Team information
- Current team: Mangasport

Senior career*
Years	Team	Apps	(Gls)
2011–2013	Mangasport		
2013–2014	Olympique Béja	5	(0)
2014–	Mangasport		

International career^{‡}
2011–	Gabon	5	(0)
2012–	Gabon U-23	4	(0)
- * Club domestic league appearances and goals as of 16 January 2014 ‡ National team caps and goals as of 16 January 2013

Cédric Boussoughou Mabikou (born 20 July 1991 in Moanda) is a Gabonese player who plays for AS Mangasport. He captained the Gabon under-23 team to qualification for the 2012 Olympics and was in the squad for the senior team at 2012 Africa Cup of Nations.

In July 2013, he left Gabon to play for Tunisian side Olympique Béja.
