= Muller Dinda =

Gabonese footballer

Personal information
- Date of birth: 22 September 1995 (age 31)
- Place of birth: Moanda, Gabon
- Height: 1.70 m (5 ft 7 in)
- Position: Defender

Youth career
- 200?–2011: USM Libreville

Senior career*
Years	Team	Apps	(Gls)
2011–2012	USM Libreville		
2012–2014	Missile FC		
2015–2017	Mangasport		
2017–2018	Widad Témara		
2018–2019	Raja Casablanca	8	(0)
2019–2021	Sohar		
2021–2022	Us Bitam		
2022–2023	AS Mangasport		

International career
2011–2012	Gabon U23	4	(0)
2012	Gabon Olympic	3	(0)
2013–	Gabon	4	(0)
- * Club domestic league appearances and goals

Muller Dinda (born 22 September 1995) is a Gabonese international footballer who plays for gabonese club As Mangasport and the Gabon national team. He competed at the 2012 Summer Olympics.

== Honours ==
=== Club ===
Mangasport

- Gabon Championnat National D1: 2015
