= Ousmane Mané =

Senegalese footballer (born 1990)

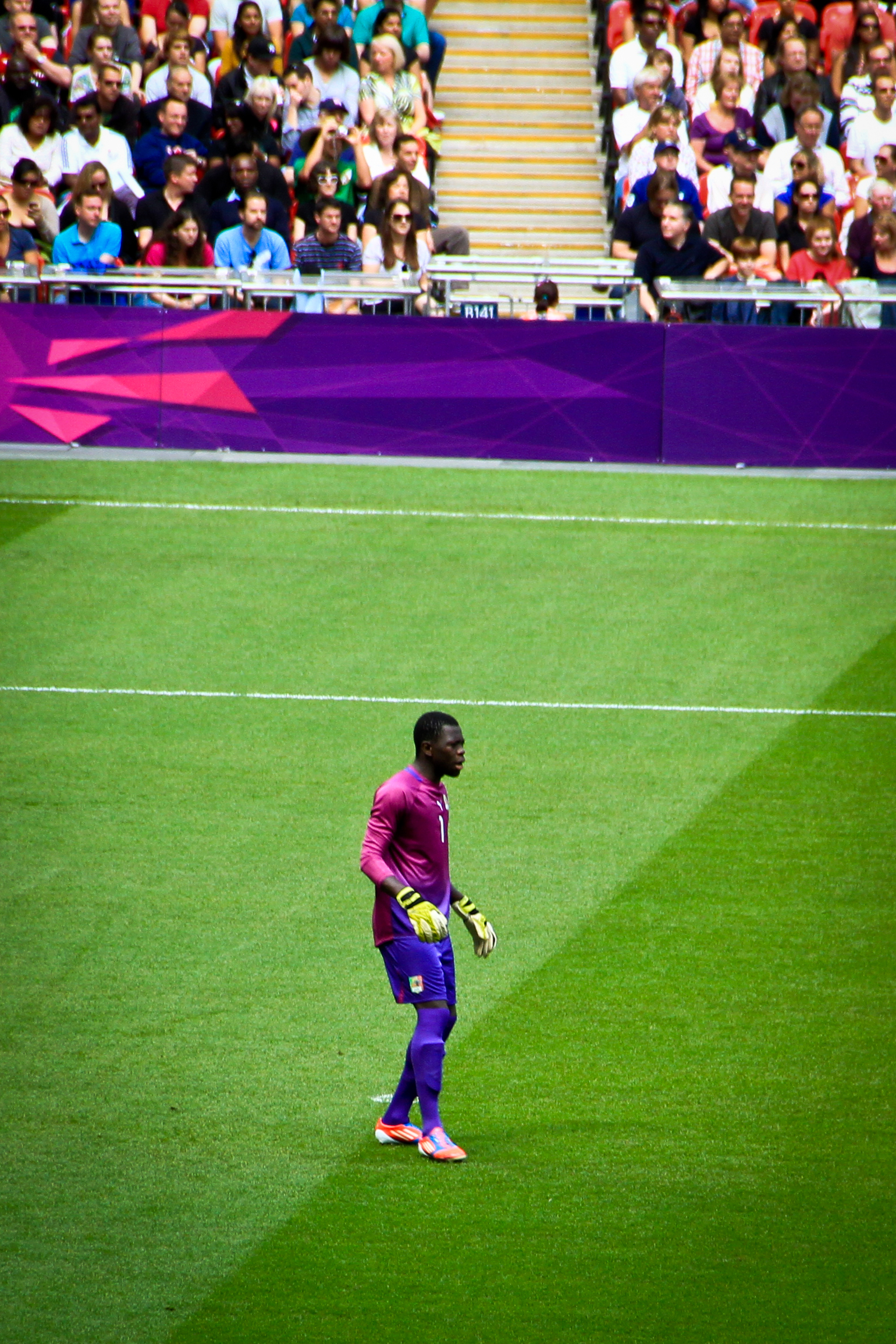
- Mané with Senegal in 2012

Personal information
- Date of birth: 1 October 1990 (age 36)
- Place of birth: Diourbel, Senegal
- Height: 1.83 m (6 ft 0 in)
- Position: Goalkeeper

Team information
- Current team: Hafia FC

Senior career*
| Years | Team | Apps | (Gls) |
| 2014–2018 | Diambars | | |
| 2018–2019 | Casa Sports | | |
| 2019– | Hafia FC | | |

International career
| 2012–2015 | Senegal | 5 | (0) |
- * Club domestic league appearances and goals as of 18 June 2014

Ousmane Mané (born 1 October 1990 in Diourbel) is a Senegalese professional footballer who plays for as a goalkeeper for Hafia FC.

He represented Senegal at the 2012 Summer Olympics Football Tournament.
