= Allen Nono =

Gabonese footballer

Allen Dorian Nono (born 15 August 1992 in Port-Gentil) is a Gabonese professional footballer who plays as a forward for Lambaréné AC. He made six appearances for the Gabon national team between 2012 and 2016 and competed at the 2012 Summer Olympics.

== Club career ==
- 2009–2011 US Bitam
- 2011–2012 USM Libreville
- 2012–2013 Olympique Khouribga
- 2013–2015 AS Mangasport
- 2015–2017 AS Pélican
- 2017–2018 Free State Stars
- 2018 CF Mounana
- 2019–2022 AS Pélican
- 2022– Lambaréné AC
