= Pierluigi Tami =

Swiss-Italian footballer and manager (born 1961)

Personal information
- Date of birth: 12 September 1961 (age 65)
- Place of birth: Clusone, Italy
- Height: 1.82 m (6 ft 0 in)
- Position: Defender

Senior career*
Years	Team	Apps	(Gls)
1981–1984	Chiasso	43	(6)
1984–1988	Locarno	26	(5)
1988–1990	Bellinzona	43	(3)
1990–1993	Lugano	72	(3)
Total		178	(17)

Managerial career
- 1999–2002: Locarno
- 2002–2003: Lugano
- 2005: Switzerland U17
- 2006–2015: Switzerland (assistant)
- 2009–2015: Switzerland U21
- 2012: Switzerland U23
- 2015–2017: Grasshopper Club Zürich
- 2017–2018: Lugano
Medal record
Men's football
Representing Switzerland (as manager)
UEFA European Under-21 Championship
Runner-up	2011
- * Club domestic league appearances and goals

Pierluigi Tami (born 12 September 1961) is the current director of the Switzerland men's national teams. A former football manager and defender, he holds Swiss and Italian citizenship.

== Career ==
He was in charge of the Switzerland national under-21 football team, and also worked as an assistant to coach Ottmar Hitzfeld during his time as manager of the Switzerland national football team. In 2011, he won the award for Swiss football coach of the year. Tami coached the Swiss under-23 team at the 2012 Summer Olympics held in London.

Tami played for FC Chiasso, FC Locarno, AC Bellinzona, and FC Lugano in a career that saw him spend his entire time in the Italian speaking part of Switzerland. He previously coached Lugano, Locarno, and various Switzerland national youth teams.

On 1 July 2019, he was appointed as director of the Switzerland men's national teams by the Swiss Football Association. As the first holder of the newly created position, he will be mainly in charge of the senior and U21 national teams.

== Honours ==
=== Individual ===
- Swiss Super League Manager of the Year: 2015–16
