= Merlin Tandjigora =

Gabonese footballer

Personal information
- Full name: Merlin Koumba Abdoulaye Tandjigora
- Date of birth: 6 April 1990 (age 36)
- Place of birth: Port-Gentil, Gabon
- Height: 1.72 m (5 ft 8 in)
- Position: Midfielder

Youth career
- 1998–2004: Stade Mandji
- 2004–2008: ENF Port-Gentil
- 2009–2010: Metz

Senior career*
Years	Team	Apps	(Gls)
2008–2009	Stade Mandji		
2010–2011	Metz	6	(0)
2010–2011	Metz B	24	(0)
2011–2014	Carquefou	70	(2)
2015	Istres	7	(0)
2015	Leixões	15	(3)
2016	Meizhou Hakka	25	(0)
2017–2018	Belenenses	8	(1)
2018–2019	Belenenses SAD	0	(0)
2019–2020	Vila Real	7	(0)
2020–2021	US Vimy	4	(0)
2021	Djoliba AC		
2021–2023	US Vimy	35	(0)

International career
2008	Gabon U20	2	(0)
2010–	Gabon	28	(0)
- * Club domestic league appearances and goals as of 20:47, 23 November 2023 (UTC)

Merlin Abdoulaye Tandjigora (born 6 April 1990) is a Gabonese professional footballer who plays as a central midfielder.

== Career ==
Born in Port-Gentil, Tandjigora was a player of the national football school located in his hometown. On 9 July 2010, he became the first player from the academy to sign a professional contract with a European club after signing a one-year contract with Metz.

Tandjigora arrived at Metz in 2009 and joined the club's Championnat de France amateur 2 team for the 2009–10 season. He played in 21 matches and scored two goals as the reserve team of Metz were crowned champions of the league, finishing with 107 points. After the season, Tandjigora signed his first professional contract and was, subsequently, promoted to the senior team and assigned the number 12 shirt by new manager Dominique Bijotat. He made his professional debut on 30 July 2010 in a Coupe de la Ligue match against Clermont. Tandjigora started the match and played 76 minutes in a 3–1 defeat. He made his league debut a week later in a 2–0 defeat to Évian.

Tandjigora was formerly a Gabonese youth international, having earned caps with the nation's under-20 team in qualification for the 2009 African Youth Championship. On 30 September 2010, he was called up to the senior team for the first time by coach Gernot Rohr for matches against Oman and Saudi Arabia. He competed for Gabon at the 2012 Summer Olympics.

On 13 December 2019, it was confirmed that Tandjigore had joined S.C. Vila Real.

== Honours ==
=== Club ===
Stade Mandji

- Gabon Championnat National D1: 2009
