= Ali Khasif =

Emirati footballer (born 1987)

Personal information
- Full name: Ali Khaseif Humad Khaseif Housani
- Date of birth: 9 June 1987 (age 39)
- Place of birth: Abu Dhabi, United Arab Emirates
- Height: 1.87 m (6 ft 2 in)
- Position: Goalkeeper

Team information
- Current team: Al-Jazira
- Number: 55

Senior career*
Years	Team	Apps	(Gls)
2004–2005	Fujairah	10	(0)
2005–	Al-Jazira	324	(0)

International career^{‡}
2012	United Arab Emirates Olympic (O.P.)	2	(0)
2009–	United Arab Emirates	74	(0)
- * Club domestic league appearances and goals as of 28 May 2022 ‡ National team caps and goals as of 17 September 2026

Ali Khaseif Humad Khaseif Housani, known as Ali Khasif (Arabic: علي خصيف; born 9 June 1987 in Abu Dhabi) is an Emirati professional footballer who plays for Al-Jazira as a goalkeeper.
