= Ahmed Ali (footballer, born 1990) =

Emirati football player

Personal information
- Full name: Ahmed Ali Salem Khamis Al-Abri
- Date of birth: 28 January 1990 (age 36)
- Place of birth: Sharjah, United Arab Emirates
- Height: 1.73 m (5 ft 8 in)
- Position: Left midfielder

Youth career
- Al-Wahda

Senior career*
Years	Team	Apps	(Gls)
2008–2010	Al-Wahda	1	(0)
2010–2015	Baniyas	19	(5)
2015–2019	Al Dhafra	49	(6)
2019–2020	Al-Wahda	6	(0)
2019–2020	→ Al-Wasl (loan)	13	(1)
2021–2022	Al Dhafra	5	(0)

International career^{‡}
2008–2010	UAE U-20	45	(1)
2011–2018	UAE	8	(1)
- * Club domestic league appearances and goals as of 26 March 2016 (UTC) ‡ National team caps and goals as of 26 March 2016 (UTC)

Ahmed Ali Salem Khamis Al-Abri (Arabic: أحمد علي سالم خميس العبري; born 28 January 1990), known as Ahmed Ali (Arabic: أحمد علي), is an Emirati football player who currently plays as a left midfielder. He appeared in the UAE team at the 2012 Summer Olympics.

== Career statistics ==
=== National Team ===
As of 27 September 2009

Team	Season	Cup^{2}			Asia^{1}			Total		
Team	Season	Apps	Goals	Assists	Apps	Goals	Assists	Apps	Goals	Assists
UAE U-20	2009	4	1	2	0	0	0	0	0	0
UAE U-20	Total	0	0	0	0	0	0	0	0	0
Career totals		0	0	0	0	0	0	0	0	0

^{1}Continental competitions include the AFC U-19 Championship
^{2}Other tournaments include the FIFA U-20 World Cup

=== Club ===
Club	Season	League			Cup^{2}			Asia^{1}			Total		
Club	Season	Apps	Goals	Assists	Apps	Goals	Assists	Apps	Goals	Assists	Apps	Goals	Assists
Al-Wahda	2009–10	1	0	0	0	0	0	0	0	0	0	0	0
Al-Wahda	Total	1	0	0	0	0	0	0	0	0	0	0	0
Career totals		1	0	0	0	0	0	0	0	0	0	0	0

^{1}Continental competitions include the AFC Champions League
^{2}Other tournaments include the UAE President Cup and Etisalat Emirates Cup
