= Franck Engonga =

Gabonese footballer (born 1993)

Personal information
- Full name: Franck Engonga
- Date of birth: July 26, 1993 (age 33)
- Place of birth: Libreville, Gabon
- Height: 1.73 m (5 ft 8 in)
- Position: Midfielder

Team information
- Current team: Darnes

Senior career*
Years	Team	Apps	(Gls)
2010–2012	CF Mounana		
2012–2013	Boca Juniors reserve-team		
2013–	CF Mounana		
2014–2015	Olympique Khouribga	10	(0)
2015–2022	Tala'ea El Gaish	145	(1)
2022–	Darnes		

International career^{‡}
2012–	Gabon U-20	10	(7)
2012–	Gabon	20	(0)
- * Club domestic league appearances and goals as of 1 July 2022 ‡ National team caps and goals as of 18 October 2018

Franck Engonga (born 26 July 1993) is a Gabonese professional footballer who currently plays for Darnes SC and formerly for the Gabon national football team. He has competed at the 2012 Summer Olympics.

== Career ==
=== Boca Juniors ===
Engonga signed with the Argentine giants Boca Juniors in October 2012.

=== Club Africain ===
In August 2013, it was announced that Engonga has signed a three-year contract with the Tunisian side Club Africain, but he returned to his team CF Mounana.
