= Emmanuel Ndong =

Gabonese footballer

Emmanuel Ndong (born 4 May 1992) is a Gabonese professional footballer who plays as a midfielder for CF Mounana and the Gabon national team. He competed at the 2012 Summer Olympics.
