= Saad Surour =

Emirati footballer (born 1990)

Personal information
- Full name: Saad Surour Masoud Surour Baniyas
- Date of birth: 19 July 1990 (age 36)
- Place of birth: Kalba, UAE
- Height: 1.76 m (5 ft 9 in)
- Position: Defender

Senior career*
Years	Team	Apps	(Gls)
2009–2014	Al-Ahli	30	(1)
2010	→ Al-Jazira (loan)	0	(0)
2014–2016	Baniyas F.C.	3	(0)
2016–2017	Al Wasl FC	3	(0)
2017–2020	Emirates Club	56	(2)
2020–2021	Ajman	8	(0)
- * Club domestic league appearances and goals

Saad Surour Mas'ud Surour Beniyas (Arabic: سعد سرور مسعود سرور بني ياس, born 19 July 1990) is an Emirati professional football player who plays as a defender for the United Arab Emirates national football team. He competed at the 2012 Summer Olympics.
