= Jerry Obiang =

Gabonese footballer

Jerry Obiang (born 10 June 1992 in Libreville) is a Gabonese professional footballer. He plays for Gabon national football team. He has competed at the 2012 Summer Olympics.
