= Kalidou Yero =

Senegalese professional footballer (born 1991)

Personal information
- Full name: Kalidou Coulibaly Yero
- Date of birth: 19 August 1991 (age 35)
- Place of birth: Dakar, Senegal
- Height: 1.95 m (6 ft 5 in)
- Position: Forward

Youth career
- 2009–2010: Porto

Senior career*
| Years | Team | Apps | (Gls) |
| 2008–2009 | Istres | 1 | (0) |
| 2009–2011 | Porto | 0 | (0) |
| 2010 | → Portimonense (loan) | 11 | (0) |
| 2010–2011 | → Oliveirense (loan) | 26 | (7) |
| 2011–2014 | Gil Vicente | 24 | (4) |
| 2013–2014 | → Oliveirense (loan) | 28 | (9) |
| 2014–2015 | Oliveirense | 26 | (11) |
| 2015–2016 | Penafiel | 36 | (10) |
| 2016–2017 | Freamunde | 16 | (1) |
| 2017–2018 | Salgueiros | 3 | (2) |
| 2018 | Cova Piedade | 7 | (0) |
| 2019 | Perak | 3 | (1) |
| 2019 | AD Oliveirense | 9 | (1) |
| 2020 | Lusitanos Saint-Maur | 4 | (0) |
| 2021 | Oriental | 1 | (0) |
| 2022–2023 | Laval B | 6 | (0) |

International career
| 2012 | Senegal Olympic | 4 | (1) |
- * Club domestic league appearances and goals as of 20:09, 10 October 2023 (UTC)

Kalidou Coulibaly Yero (born 19 August 1991) is a Senegalese professional footballer who plays as a forward.

== Club career ==
Born in Dakar, Yero made his debut as a senior with FC Istres, then signed with FC Porto in 2009 to complete his development. He was loaned twice during his spell, and also appeared in three competitive games with the club, totalling 57 minutes of play between the Portuguese Cup and the Portuguese League Cup.

Yero joined Gil Vicente F.C. in summer 2011, his maiden appearance in Primeira Liga occurring on 24 October as he came on as a late substitute in a 6–1 away loss against Sporting CP. Two years later, he moved to U.D. Oliveirense of the Segunda Liga, spending his first season on loan.

== International career ==
Yero represented Senegal at the 2012 Summer Olympics, playing all five matches in an eventual quarter-final exit.

== Honours ==
Porto

- Taça de Portugal: 2009–10
