= Jorge Enríquez =

Mexican footballer (born 1991)

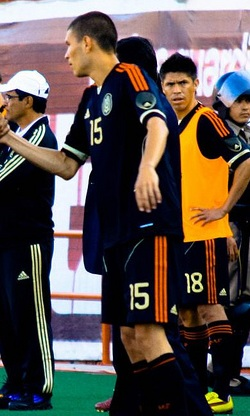
- Enríquez in 2011

Personal information
- Full name: Jorge Enríquez García
- Date of birth: 8 January 1991 (age 35)
- Place of birth: Mexicali, Baja California, Mexico
- Height: 1.90 m (6 ft 3 in)
- Position: Defensive midfielder

Youth career
- 2007–2010: Guadalajara

Senior career*
Years	Team	Apps	(Gls)
2010–2018	Guadalajara	108	(4)
2016	→ León (loan)	8	(0)
2016	→ Coras (loan)	6	(0)
2017	→ Santos Laguna (loan)	14	(1)
2018	→ Puebla (loan)	8	(0)
2018–2019	Omonia	6	(0)
2019–2020	Salamanca	12	(0)
2020	Tiburón	0	(0)
2021–2022	Venados	40	(1)
Total		202	(6)

International career
2011	Mexico U20	13	(1)
2011–2012	Mexico U23	32	(2)
2011–2013	Mexico	8	(0)
Medal record
Men's football
Representing Mexico
Olympic Games
Gold medal – first place	2012 London	Team
Olympic Qualifying Championship
Winner	2012 United States
Toulon Tournament
Winner	2012 France	Team
Pan American Games
Gold medal – first place	2011 Guadalajara	Team
- * Club domestic league appearances and goals as of 5 March 2022

Jorge Enríquez García (born 8 January 1991) is a former Mexican professional footballer who played as a defensive midfielder. He is an Olympic gold medalist.

== Club career ==
=== C.D. Guadalajara ===
Enriquez was born in Mexicali, Baja California, and debuted with Chivas on 5 February 2010 in a match against Pachuca CF, corresponding to week 6 of the Bicentenario tournament. He came on in the 86th minute, replacing Adolfo Bautista. Enríquez scored his first goal in the quarter finals outside the penalty area against Monarcas Morelia.

=== Club León ===
On 6 December 2015, Guadalajara announced Enríquez will go on loan to Club León for six months.

=== Omonia ===
On 14 June 2018, it was reported Enriquez would be transferred to Omonia.

== International career ==
Jorge Enríquez first played for the Mexico national team at the 2011 CONCACAF U-20 Championship. Mexico won the tournament and qualified to the 2011 Pan American Games.

He was part of the U-22 Mexico squad that competed at the 2011 Copa América. They eventually lost at the group stage, being in the last place.

Enríquez represented Mexico once again at the 2011 FIFA U-20 World Cup, they were knocked out of the competition by Brazil at the semifinals, but won the third place beating France. In this tournament Enriquez received the Bronze Ball award coming third in the Tournament's Best Player award.

Chatón was again part of the squad that represented Mexico at the Pan American Games. Mexico won the gold medal beating Argentina at the finals.

In the 2012 Summer Olympics, he became an important piece in the road to the gold medal providing important passes to his partners, he even scored the first goal against Senegal in the quarterfinals.

== Career statistics ==
=== International ===
As of match played 25 July 2013

National team	Year	Apps	Goals
Mexico	2011	3	0
Mexico	2012	2	0
Mexico	2013	3	0
Total		8	0

== Honours ==
Guadalajara

- Copa MX: Apertura 2015

Mexico Youth

- CONCACAF U-20 Championship: 2011
- Pan American Games: 2011
- CONCACAF Olympic Qualifying Championship: 2012
- Toulon Tournament: 2012
- Olympic Gold Medal: 2012

Individual

- FIFA U-20 World Cup Bronze Ball: 2011
