= Baek Sung-dong =

South Korean footballer (born 1991)

Personal information
- Date of birth: 13 August 1991 (age 35)
- Place of birth: Gwangju, South Korea
- Height: 1.71 m (5 ft 7 in)
- Position: Midfielder

Team information
- Current team: Ayutthaya United
- Number: 88

Youth career
- 2007–2009: Kumho High School
- 2007–2008: → Watford (KFA Youth Project)
- 2010–2011: Yonsei University

Senior career*
Years	Team	Apps	(Gls)
2012–2014	Júbilo Iwata	58	(5)
2015–2016	Sagan Tosu	36	(2)
2016	→ V-Varen Nagasaki (loan)	18	(0)
2017–2019	Suwon FC	97	(20)
2020–2021	Gyeongnam FC	59	(13)
2022	FC Anyang	35	(5)
2023–2025	Pohang Steelers	69	(6)
2026–	Ayutthaya United	11	(0)

International career^{‡}
2009–2011	South Korea U-20	20	(1)
2011–2014	South Korea U-23	23	(4)
2013	South Korea	1	(0)
Medal record
Olympic Games
Bronze medal – third place	London 2012	Team
- * Club domestic league appearances and goals as of 10 May 2026 ‡ National team caps and goals as of 1 December 2013

- Baek Sung-dong
- Hangul: 백성동
- Hanja: 白星東
- RR: Baek Seongdong
- MR: Paek Sŏngdong

Baek Sung-dong (Korean: 백성동; Korean pronunciation: [pɛ̝k̚.s͈ʌŋ.doŋ] or [pɛ̝k̚] [sʌŋ.doŋ]; born 13 August 1991) is a South Korean football midfielder who plays for Thai League 1 side Ayutthaya United.

== Career ==
In 2007, Baek participated in the Youth Project of Watford F.C. on the recommendation of the Korea Football Association. He was capped four times for the national team representing them in the 2011 FIFA U-20 World Cup. Following his good performances in the competitions, South Korean under-23 team coach Hong Myung-bo included him in the national squad.

On 29 December 2011, Baek signed his first professional contract with J1 League club Júbilo Iwata, agreeing a three-year deal with the club.

In 2012, he was part of the South Korean team that won bronze at the Summer Olympics.

== Career statistics ==
=== Club ===
Updated to 30 September 2023.

Appearances and goals by club, season and competition
Club	Season	League			National Cup		League Cup		Continental		Other^{1}		Total	
Club	Season	Division	Apps	Goals	Apps	Goals	Apps	Goals	Apps	Goals	Apps	Goals	Apps	Goals
Júbilo Iwata	2012	J1 League	12	2	0	0	3	0	-		-		15	2
Júbilo Iwata	2013	J1 League	19	1	2	0	1	0	-		-		22	1
Júbilo Iwata	2014	J2 League	27	2	2	0	-		-		1	0	30	2
Júbilo Iwata	Total		58	5	4	0	4	0	-		1	0	67	5
Sagan Tosu	2015	J1 League	25	2	2	0	6	0	-		-		33	2
Sagan Tosu	2016	J1 League	11	0	0	0	5	1	-		-		16	1
Sagan Tosu	Total		36	2	2	0	11	1	-		-		49	3
V-Varen Nagasaki (loan)	2016	J2 League	18	0	1	0	0	0	-		-		19	0
Suwon FC	2017	K League 2	32	8	0	0	-		-		-		32	8
Suwon FC	2018	K League 2	30	5	1	0	-		-		-		31	5
Suwon FC	2019	K League 2	35	7	1	0	-		-		-		36	7
Suwon FC	Total		97	20	2	0	-		-		-		99	20
Gyeongnam FC	2020	K League 2	24	9	1	0	-		-		2	0	27	9
Gyeongnam FC	2021	K League 2	33	4	2	1	-		-		-		35	5
Gyeongnam FC	Total		57	13	3	1	-		-		2	0	62	14
FC Anyang	2022	K League 2	34	5	0	0	-		-		3	0	37	5
Pohang Steelers	2023	K League 1	26	4	1	0	-		0	0	-		27	4
Career total			326	49	13	1	15	1	0	0	6	0	360	51

^{1}Includes Promotion Playoffs to J1 and K League 1 Promotion Playoffs.

== Honours ==
Individual

- K League 2 Best XI: 2020
- K League 1 top assist provider: 2023
