= Gabon national under-23 football team =

National association football team

Gabon Under-23
- Nickname(s): Les Panthères (The Panthers)
- Association: Gabonese Football Federation
- Confederation: CAF (Africa)
- Head coach: Saturnin Ibela
First colours	Second colours

First international
- Gabon 0–0 Guinea (Libreville, Gabon; 18 June 1967)

Biggest win
- Gabon 3–1 Ivory Coast (Tangier, Morocco; 3 December 2011)

Biggest defeat
- Guinea 6–1 Gabon (Conakry, Guinea; 9 July 1967)

Summer Olympics
- Appearances: 1 (first in 2012)
- Best result: Group Stage (2012)

Gabon national under-23 football team (also known as Gabon Olympic, Gabon U-23) represents Gabon in international football competitions in the Olympic Games and the CAF U-23 Championship. The selection is limited to players under the age of 23 but the Olympics allows for the addition of up to three overage players. The team is controlled by the Gabonese Football Federation. Gabon made its first appearance in football at the 2012 Olympics in London.

== Competitive Record ==
=== CAF U-23 Championship ===
CAF U-23 Championship Record
Year	Round	Position	GP	W	D	L	GS	GA
(Morocco) 2011	Winner	1	5	3	1	1	7	4
Total	1/1	-	5	3	1	1	7	4

=== Olympic Games ===
Host nation / Year	Result	GP	W	D*	L	GS	GA
(Greece) 1896	No football tournament was held
(France) 1900	Did not enter
(United States) 1904	Did not enter
(United Kingdom) 1908	Did not enter
(Sweden) 1912	Did not enter
(Belgium) 1920	Did not enter
(France) 1924	Did not enter
(Netherlands) 1928	Did not enter
(United States) 1932	No football tournament was held
(Nazi Germany) 1936	Did not enter
(United Kingdom) 1948	Did not enter
(Finland) 1952	Did not enter
(Australia) 1956	Did not enter
(Italy) 1960	Did not enter
(Japan) 1964	Did not enter
(Mexico) 1968	Did not qualify
(West Germany) 1972	Did not qualify
(Canada) 1976	Did not enter
(Soviet Union) 1980	Did not enter
(United States) 1984	Did not qualify
(South Korea) 1988	Did not enter
(Spain) 1992	Did not qualify
(United States) 1996	Did not qualify
(Australia) 2000	Did not qualify
(Greece) 2004	Did not enter
(China) 2008	Did not enter
(United Kingdom) 2012	Group Stage	3	0	2	1	1	3
(Brazil) 2016	Did not qualify
Total	1/26	3	0	2	1	1	3

*Denotes draws including knockout matches decided on penalty kicks.

== Forthcoming fixtures ==
Date	Competition	Location	Home team	Result	Away team	Scorers
26 July 2012	2012 Olympics	Newcastle, Great Britain	Gabon	1-1	Switzerland	Aubameyang 45'
29 July 2012	2012 Olympics	Coventry, Great Britain	Mexico	2-0	Gabon	
1 August 2012	2012 Olympics	London, Great Britain	South Korea	0-0	Gabon	

== Current squad ==
The following players were called up in October 2022.

No.	Pos.	Player	Date of birth (age)	Caps	Club
1	GK	François Bekale	15 February 2002 (age 24)		(Gabon) AS Stade Mandji
	GK	Ruud Steeven Tsoumbou	20 December 2003 (age 22)		(Gabon) AS Stade Mandji
	GK	Gesril Andome			(Gabon) CF Mounana
2	DF	Graig Fhauster Aworet			(Gabon) US Bitam
3	DF	Aimé Mboungui Moudou			(Gabon) CF Mounana
	DF	Marcus Mombo			(Gabon) Bouenguidi Sports
	DF	Jean Jacques Oyinamono Ngoulou			(Gabon) US Bitam
	DF	Christe Siama			(Gabon) Centre Sportif de Bendje
	DF	Yannick Aboghe Nzoghe	15 July 1999 (age 27)		(Gabon) AS Pélican
	DF	Bevine Louembet			(Gabon) Bouenguidi Sports
	DF	Lloyd George Lata	13 October 2001 (age 25)		(Gabon) AS Stade Mandji
	MF	Hants Mbenga Mboumba			(Gabon) AS Pélican
	MF	Roy Mouniengue Mbongui	1 December 2005 (age 20)		(Gabon) AS Stade Mandji
	MF	Jérémy Oyono			(France) US Boulogne
	MF	Josias Mengome Mengome			(Gabon) Sporting Club Nyanga
	MF	Boris Messi Ondenot			(Gabon) Sporting Club Nyanga
	FW	Randy Essang Matouti			(Gabon) FC 105 Libreville
	FW	André Jordy Ella			(Gabon) US Bitam
	FW	Romess Essogo (captain)	26 March 2001 (age 25)		(Belarus) Slavia Mozyr
	FW	Gabriel Meye			(Gabon) AS Pélican
	FW	Ben Jorcy Kabinambele			(Gabon) AS Mangasport
	FW	Jhovany Mayoulou			(Gabon) AS Dikaki
	FW	Yohan Nkoghe Mbatchi			(Gabon) US Bitam

== See also ==
- Gabon national football team
