= 2011 African U-23 Championship squads =

Below is a list of squads used in the 2011 African U-23 Championship.

== Group A ==
=== Algeria ===
Coach: (Algeria) Azzedine Aït Djoudi

No.	Pos.	Player	Date of birth (age)	Caps	Goals	Club |
1	GK	Sid Ahmed Rafik Mazouzi	February 1, 1989 (aged 22)	13	0	(Algerian Football Federation) WA Tlemcen
2	DF	Abderrezak Bitam	April 18, 1989 (aged 22)	15	0	(Algerian Football Federation) JS Kabylie
3	DF	Farouk Chafaï	June 23, 1990 (aged 21)	2	0	(Algerian Football Federation) USM Alger
4	DF	Djameleddine Benlamri	December 25, 1989 (aged 21)	8	1	(Algerian Football Federation) NA Hussein Dey
5	DF	Sofiane Khelili	December 9, 1989 (aged 21)	12	0	(Algerian Football Federation) JS Kabylie
6	MF	Mehdi Abeid	August 6, 1992 (aged 19)	2	0	(The Football Association) Newcastle United
7	MF	Amir Sayoud	August 31, 1990 (aged 21)	6	0	(Egyptian Football Association) Ismaily
8	MF	Youcef Belaïli	March 14, 1992 (aged 19)	12	0	(Algerian Football Federation) MC Oran
9	MF	Sid Ahmed Aouedj	July 2, 1991 (aged 20)	18	4	(Algerian Football Federation) MC Oran
10	FW	Mohamed Chalali	April 4, 1989 (aged 22)	11	9	(Scottish Football Association) Aberdeen
11	FW	Baghdad Bounedjah	November 30, 1991 (aged 19)	3	2	(Algerian Football Federation) USM El Harrach
12	DF	Abdelaziz Ali Guechi	November 1, 1990 (aged 21)	13	1	(Algerian Football Federation) USM Annaba
13	MF	Merouane Anane	May 31, 1990 (aged 21)	9	0	(Algerian Football Federation) CR Belouizdad
14	MF	Amine Touahri	February 12, 1989 (aged 22)	11	1	(Algerian Football Federation) USM El Harrach
15	MF	Mokhtar Belkhiter	January 15, 1992 (aged 19)	6	0	(Algerian Football Federation) USM Blida
16	GK	Hamza Dahmane	September 22, 1990 (aged 21)	3	0	(Algerian Football Federation) CR Belouizdad
17	MF	Mehdi Benaldjia	May 14, 1991 (aged 20)	8	4	(Algerian Football Federation) USM Alger
18	MF	Farid Daoud	August 25, 1989 (aged 22)	14	0	(Algerian Football Federation) MC Alger
19	FW	Jugurtha Hamroun	January 27, 1989 (aged 22)	1	0	(Bulgarian Football Union) Chernomorets Burgas
20	DF	Mohamed Khoutir Ziti	April 19, 1989 (aged 22)	14	2	(Algerian Football Federation) CS Constantine
21	GK	Boualem Benmalek	January 30, 1989 (aged 22)	4	0	(Algerian Football Federation) AS Khroub

=== Morocco ===
Coach: (Netherlands) Pim Verbeek

No.	Pos.	Player	Date of birth (age)	Caps	Goals	Club |
1	GK	Yassine El Kharroubi	March 29, 1990 (aged 21)			(French Football Federation) US Quevilly
2	DF	Mohamed Abarhoun	May 3, 1989 (aged 22)			(Royal Moroccan Football Federation) Moghreb Tétouan
3	MF	Mohammed Ali Bemammer	November 19, 1989 (aged 22)			(Royal Moroccan Football Federation) MAS Fez
4	MF	Abdelaziz Barrada	June 19, 1989 (aged 22)			(Royal Spanish Football Federation) Getafe
5	DF	El Mahdi Bellaaroussi	December 25, 1989 (aged 21)			(Royal Moroccan Football Federation) CODM Meknès
6	DF	Zakarya Bergdich	January 7, 1989 (aged 22)			(French Football Federation) Lens
7	FW	Soufiane Bidaoui	April 20, 1990 (aged 21)			(Royal Belgian Football Association) Lierse
8	MF	Mehdi Carcela-Gonzalez	July 1, 1989 (aged 22)			(Russian Football Union) Anzhi Makhachkala^{1}
9	DF	Zouhair Feddal	January 1, 1989 (aged 22)			(Royal Spanish Football Federation) Espanyol B
10	MF	Driss Fettouhi	September 30, 1989 (aged 22)			(French Football Federation) Istres
11	FW	Said Idazza	April 25, 1989 (aged 22)			(French Football Federation) CSO Amnéville
12	GK	Younes Itri	February 11, 1991 (aged 20)			(German Football Association) FC Carl Zeiss Jena
13	DF	Khalid Karkich	January 15, 1991 (aged 20)			(Royal Spanish Football Federation) Levante B
14	FW	Youness Mokhtar	August 29, 1991 (aged 20)			(Royal Dutch Football Association) FC Eindhoven
15	MF	Imad Najah	February 19, 1992 (aged 19)			(Royal Dutch Football Association) PSV Eindhoven
16	DF	Abdelatif Noussir	February 20, 1990 (aged 21)			(Royal Moroccan Football Federation) FUS Rabat
17	DF	Lotfi Oubilla	August 11, 1989 (aged 22)			(Royal Moroccan Football Federation) FAR Rabat
18	FW	Yacine Qasmi	January 3, 1991 (aged 20)			(French Football Federation) Rennes
19	FW	Adnane Tighadouini	November 30, 1992 (aged 18)			(Royal Dutch Football Association) Vitesse Arnhem
20	MF	Marwane Saâdane	January 17, 1992 (aged 19)			(Royal Moroccan Football Federation) FUS Rabat
21	GK	Yassine El Houasli	November 24, 1990 (aged 21)			(Royal Moroccan Football Federation) Raja Casablanca

^{1} On the eve of the start of the competition, FIFA informed Morocco that Carcela-Gonzalez was ineligible to represent Morocco in the tournament because he had already represented Belgium in the same competition four years ago. As it was past the deadline, a replacement couldn't be called in his place.

=== Nigeria ===
Coach: (Nigeria) Augustine Eguavoen

No.	Pos.	Player	Date of birth (age)	Caps	Club
1	GK	Dele Ajiboye	August 7, 1990 (aged 21)		Unattached
2	DF	Terna Suswam	September 5, 1991 (aged 20)		(Portugal) Vitória F.C.
3	DF	Usman Amodu	December 16, 1990 (aged 21)		(Colombia) Llaneros
4	MF	Nwankwo Obiora	July 12, 1991 (aged 20)		(Italy) Parma
5	DF	Kingsley Udoh	December 7, 1990 (aged 20)		(Nigeria) Heartland
6	DF	Ibok Edet	August 22, 1989 (aged 22)		(Spain) Atlético Baleares
7	FW	Danny Uchechi	September 14, 1989 (aged 22)		(England) Sheffield Wednesday
8	MF	Raheem Lawal	May 4, 1990 (aged 21)		(Spain) Atlético Baleares
9	FW	Olarenwaju Kayode	May 8, 1993 (aged 18)		(Ivory Coast) ASEC Mimosas
10	MF	Nosa Igiebor	November 9, 1990 (aged 21)		(Israel) Hapoel Tel Aviv^{2}
11	FW	Michel Babatunde	December 24, 1992 (aged 18)		(Ukraine) Kryvbas
12	FW	Stephen Worgu	April 6, 1990 (aged 21)		(Sudan) Al-Merrikh
13	FW	Onoriode Odah	April 14, 1992 (aged 19)		(Nigeria) Fame F.C.
14	MF	Ayo Saka	December 22, 1990 (aged 20)		(Nigeria) Ocean Boys
15	DF	Emmanuel Anyanwu	November 15, 1991 (aged 20)		(Nigeria) Enyimba
16	GK	Olufemi Thomas	August 5, 1989 (aged 22)		(Nigeria) Ocean Boys
17	FW	Osas Okoro	September 7, 1990 (aged 21)		(Nigeria) Heartland
18	FW	Gbolahan Salami	April 15, 1991 (aged 20)		(Nigeria) Shooting Stars
19	FW	Jude Aneke	April 23, 1990 (aged 21)		(Nigeria) Kaduna United
20	DF	Markson Ojobo	December 1, 1992 (aged 19)		(Nigeria) Enyimba
21	GK	Theophilus Afelokhai	July 4, 1990 (aged 21)		(Nigeria) Kano Pillars

^{2}Hapoel Tel Aviv midfielder Nosa Igiebor has ruled himself out of the final 2012 Olympic qualifiers in Morocco just as Nigeria team officials insist they are not aware of this development.

=== Senegal ===
Coach: (Senegal) Abdoulaye Sarr

No.	Pos.	Player	Date of birth (age)	Caps	Goals	Club |
1	GK	Papa Demba Camara	January 16, 1993 (aged 18)			(French Football Federation) Sochaux
2	MF	Pape Maly Diamanka	January 10, 1990 (aged 21)			(Royal Spanish Football Federation) Rayo Vallecano
3	DF	Saliou Ciss	September 15, 1989 (aged 22)			(Norwegian Football Federation) Tromsø
4	MF	El Hadji Sady Guéye	January 16, 1990 (aged 21)			(Senegalese Football Federation) Diambars
5	DF	Zargo Touré	November 11, 1989 (aged 22)			(French Football Federation) Boulogne
6	DF	Pape Ndiaye Souare	June 6, 1990 (aged 21)			(French Football Federation) Lille
7	FW	Abdoulaye Sané	October 15, 1992 (aged 19)			(French Football Federation) Rennes
8	MF	Joseph Lopy	March 15, 1992 (aged 19)			(French Football Federation) Sochaux
9	MF	Kara Mbodj	November 11, 1989 (aged 22)			(Norwegian Football Federation) Tromsø
10	FW	Dieylani Fall	November 30, 1989 (aged 21)			(French Football Federation) Auxerre
11	FW	Dame Diop	February 15, 1993 (aged 18)			(Senegalese Football Federation) Touré Kunda Footpro
12	DF	Lamine Gassama	October 20, 1989 (aged 22)			(French Football Federation) Lyon
13	DF	Abdoulaye Ba	January 1, 1991 (aged 20)			(Portuguese Football Federation) Académica Coimbra
14	FW	Omar Wade	May 15, 1990 (aged 21)			(French Football Federation) Lille
15	MF	Ibrahima Khaliloulah Seck	August 10, 1989 (aged 22)			(French Football Federation) Épinal
16	GK	Ousmane Mané	October 1, 1990 (aged 21)			(Senegalese Football Federation) Diambars
17	MF	Stephane Badji	January 18, 1990 (aged 21)			(Senegalese Football Federation) Casa Sport
18	FW	Baye Oumar Niasse	April 18, 1990 (aged 21)			(Senegalese Football Federation) US Ouakam
19	DF	Khassim Soumaré	December 23, 1991 (aged 19)			(Senegalese Football Federation) Diambars
20	MF	Emile Paul Tendeng	December 31, 1992 (aged 18)			(Senegalese Football Federation) Casa Sport
21	GK	Issa Ndiaye	April 19, 1991 (aged 20)			(Senegalese Football Federation) AS Douanes

== Group B ==
=== Ivory Coast ===
Coach: (Ivory Coast) Alain Gouaméné

No.	Pos.	Player	Date of birth (age)	Caps	Goals	Club |
1	GK	Ibrahim Koné	December 5, 1989 (aged 21)			(French Football Federation) US Boulogne
2	DF	Mahan Marc Goua	November 2, 1989 (aged 22)			(Ivorian Football Federation) Séwé Sports de San Pedro
3	DF	Konan Ruffin Ngouan	May 15, 1990 (aged 21)			(Ivorian Football Federation) Africa Sports National
4	DF	Troh César Hougnonhon	September 13, 1990 (aged 21)			(Bahrain Football Association) East Riffa Club
5	DF	Didier Boris Kadio	April 5, 1990 (aged 21)			(Ivorian Football Federation) Société Omnisports de l'Armée
6	MF	Yacoub Meite	February 10, 1990 (aged 21)			(French Football Federation) Tours FC
7	DF	Konan Joel Kouadio	October 20, 1993 (aged 18)			(Ivorian Football Federation) AFAD
8	MF	Xavier Kouassi	December 28, 1989 (aged 21)			(Swiss Football Association) Servette FC
9	MF	Moussa Koné	February 12, 1990 (aged 21)			(Italian Football Federation) Delfino Pescara 1936
10	FW	Serge Deble	October 1, 1989 (aged 22)			Unattached
11	FW	Lacina Traoré	May 20, 1990 (aged 21)			(Russian Football Union) FC Kuban Krasnodar
12	FW	Wakalible Júnior Lago	December 31, 1990 (aged 20)			(Royal Spanish Football Federation) CD Numancia
13	DF	Aubin Kouakou	June 1, 1991 (aged 20)			(Tunisian Football Federation) Stade Tunisien
14	MF	Jean Michael Seri	July 19, 1991 (aged 20)			(Ivorian Football Federation) ASEC Mimosas
15	FW	Krahire Yannick Zakri	March 26, 1991 (aged 20)			(Ivorian Football Federation) AFAD
16	GK	Gnagnélé Clovis Tahourou	December 25, 1989 (aged 21)			(Ivorian Football Federation) AFAD
17	FW	Georges Henri Griffiths	February 24, 1990 (aged 21)			(Ivorian Football Federation) AS Indenié Abengourou
18	FW	Vamouti Diomande	January 20, 1991 (aged 20)			(Norwegian Football Federation) Hønefoss BK
19	MF	Kouassi Martial Yao	October 4, 1989 (aged 22)			(Tunisian Football Federation) Stade Tunisien
20	FW	Kevin Beugré	August 23, 1992 (aged 19)			(Norwegian Football Federation) Hønefoss BK
21	GK	Ousmane Gnada	March 24, 1990 (aged 21)			(Ivorian Football Federation) AFAD

=== Egypt ===
Coach: (Egypt) Hany Ramzy

No.	Pos.	Player	Date of birth (age)	Caps	Goals	Club |
1	GK	Aly Lotfi	October 14, 1989 (aged 22)			(Egyptian Football Association) ENPPI Club
2	DF	Ali Fathy	January 2, 1992 (aged 19)			(Egyptian Football Association) Arab Contractors
3	DF	Ahmed Sobhi	March 4, 1991 (aged 20)			(Egyptian Football Association) ENPPI Club
4	MF	Hesham Mohamed	January 3, 1990 (aged 21)			(Egyptian Football Association) El-Shorta
5	DF	Moaz El-Henawy	January 29, 1990 (aged 21)			(Egyptian Football Association) Misr El Makasa
6	DF	Ahmed Hegazy	January 25, 1991 (aged 20)			(Egyptian Football Association) Ismaily
7	MF	Saleh Gomaa	August 1, 1993 (aged 18)			(Egyptian Football Association) ENPPI Club
8	MF	Shehab El-Din Ahmed	22 August 1990 (aged 21)			(Egyptian Football Association) Al-Ahly
9	FW	Marwan Mohsen	26 February 1989 (aged 22)			(Egyptian Football Association) Petrojet FC
10	FW	Mohamed Salah	June 15, 1992 (aged 19)			(Egyptian Football Association) Arab Contractors
11	MF	Ahmed Shoukry	July 21, 1989 (aged 22)			(Egyptian Football Association) Telephonat Bani Sweif
12	DF	Islam Ramadan	November 1, 1990 (aged 21)			(Egyptian Football Association) Haras El-Hodood Club
13	FW	Ahmed Hassan	March 5, 1993 (aged 18)			(Portuguese Football Federation) Rio Ave F.C.
14	MF	Hossam Hassan	April 30, 1989 (aged 22)			(Egyptian Football Association) Masry
15	MF	Mohamed Sobhi	November 21, 1992 (aged 19)			(Egyptian Football Association) ENPPI Club
16	GK	Ahmed El Shenawy	May 14, 1991 (aged 20)			(Egyptian Football Association) Masry
17	MF	Mohamed El-Nenny	July 11, 1992 (aged 19)			(Egyptian Football Association) Arab Contractors
18	MF	Ahmed Magdi	December 9, 1989 (aged 21)			(Egyptian Football Association) Ghazl El-Mehalla
19	FW	Ahmed Shroyda	October 21, 1990 (aged 21)			(Egyptian Football Association) Masry
20	DF	Omar Gaber	January 30, 1992 (aged 19)			(Egyptian Football Association) Zamalek SC
21	GK	Mohamed Bassam	December 25, 1990 (aged 20)			(Egyptian Football Association) Tala'ea El-Gaish SC

=== Gabon ===
Coach: (Gabon) Claude Albert Mbourounot

No.	Pos.	Player	Date of birth (age)	Caps	Goals	Club
1	GK	Glwadys Mbimbiangoye	June 15, 1991 (aged 20)			(Gabonese Football Federation) US O’Mbilia Nzami
2	FW	Lionel Yacouya	July 17, 1990 (aged 21)			(Gabonese Football Federation) AS Pélican
3	DF	Muller Dinda	September 22, 1995 (aged 16)			(Gabonese Football Federation) Cercle Mbéri Sportif
4	MF	Franck Engonga	July 26, 1993 (aged 18)			(Gabonese Football Federation) US O’Mbilia Nzami
5	DF	Remy Ebanega	November 17, 1989 (aged 22)			(Gabonese Football Federation) US Bitam
6	MF	Didier Ndong Ibrahim	June 17, 1994 (aged 17)			(Gabonese Football Federation) Cercle Mbéri Sportif
7	FW	Allen Nono	August 15, 1992 (aged 19)			(Gabonese Football Federation) US O’Mbilia Nzami
8	FW	Romuald Ntsitsigui	April 8, 1991 (aged 20)			(Gabonese Football Federation) AS Mangasport
9	FW	Johan Diderot Lengoualama	September 29, 1992 (aged 19)			(Gabonese Football Federation) AS Mangasport
10	FW	Levy Clement Madinda	June 11, 1992 (aged 19)			(Royal Spanish Football Federation) Celta de Vigo
11	MF	Alexander N'Doumbou	January 4, 1992 (aged 19)			(French Football Federation) US Orléans
12	DF	Ismael Abogho	January 20, 1992 (aged 19)			(Gabonese Football Federation) US Oyem
13	MF	Cedric Boussoughou	July 20, 1991 (aged 20)			(Gabonese Football Federation) AS Mangasport
14	MF	Landry Jerry Obiang Obiang	June 10, 1992 (aged 19)			(Gabonese Football Federation) Sogéa FC
15	DF	Henri Junior Ndong	August 23, 1992 (aged 19)			(Gabonese Football Federation) US Bitam
16	GK	Willy Mikiela	March 6, 1990 (aged 21)			(Gabonese Football Federation) AS Pélican
17	MF	André Biyogo Poko	January 1, 1993 (aged 18)			(French Football Federation) FC Girondins de Bordeaux
18	MF	Emmanuel Ndong	May 4, 1992 (aged 19)			(Gabonese Football Federation) Sogéa FC
19	MF	Samson Mbingui	February 9, 1992 (aged 19)			(Gabonese Football Federation) AS Mangasport
20	DF	Stevy Nzambe	September 4, 1991 (aged 20)			(French Football Federation) Olympique Marseille
21	GK	Nick Moundounga	February 25, 1994 (aged 17)			(Gabonese Football Federation) Sogéa FC

=== South Africa ===
Coach: (South Africa) Ephraim Mashaba

No.	Pos.	Player	Date of birth (age)	Caps	Goals	Club |
1	GK	Sage Lottering	April 8, 1991 (aged 20)			(South African Football Association) Moroka Swallows
2	MF	Sibusiso Khumalo	September 8, 1989 (aged 22)			(South African Football Association) Mamelodi Sundowns
3	DF	Sibusiso Mxoyana	April 14, 1989 (aged 22)			(South African Football Association) Orlando Pirates
4	DF	Thulani Hlatshwayo	December 18, 1989 (aged 21)			(South African Football Association) Ajax Cape Town
5	DF	Eric Mathoho	March 1, 1990 (aged 21)			(South African Football Association) Bloemfontein Celtic
6	FW	Rodney Ramagalela	January 10, 1989 (aged 22)			(South African Football Association) Black Leopards
7	MF	Sameehg Doutie	May 31, 1989 (aged 22)			(South African Football Association) Orlando Pirates
8	MF	Thandani Ntshumayelo	April 20, 1990 (aged 21)			(South African Football Association) SuperSport United
9	FW	Riaan Eugene	February 20, 1991 (aged 20)			(South African Football Association) Santos
10	MF	Jabulani Shongwe	February 28, 1990 (aged 21)			(South African Football Association) Mamelodi Sundowns
11	MF	Mandla Masango	July 18, 1989 (aged 22)			(South African Football Association) Kaizer Chiefs
12	FW	Phumelele Bhengu	November 19, 1989 (aged 22)			(South African Football Association) Bay United
13	DF	Siyabonga Zulu	August 22, 1993 (aged 18)			(South African Football Association) Blackburn Rovers
14	DF	Gladwin Shitolo	August 10, 1989 (aged 22)			(South African Football Association) Jomo Cosmos
15	FW	Bhongolwethu Jayiya	March 21, 1990 (aged 21)			(South African Football Association) Bidvest Wits
16	GK	Brilliant Khuzwayo	February 9, 1990 (aged 21)			(South African Football Association) Thanda Royal Zulu
17	MF	Christopher Flandorp	September 9, 1990 (aged 21)			(South African Football Association) University of Pretoria
18	MF	Thamsanqa Sangweni	May 26, 1989 (aged 22)			(South African Football Association) AmaZulu
19	MF	Kulegani Madondo	June 20, 1990 (aged 21)			(South African Football Association) Maritzburg United
20	DF	Mxolisi Mayongo	January 26, 1989 (aged 22)			(South African Football Association) AmaZulu
21	GK	Brighton Mhlongo	January 12, 1991 (aged 20)			(South African Football Association) Orlando Pirates
