= Morocco national under-23 football team =

National association football team

Morocco U-23
- Nickname(s): أسود الأطلس (The Atlas Lions)
- Association: Royal Moroccan Football Federation
- Other affiliation: Moroccan National Olympic Committee
- Confederation: CAF (Africa)
- Sub-confederation: UNAF (North Africa)
- Captain: Abde Ezzalzouli
- Home stadium: Prince Moulay Abdellah Stadium
- FIFA code: MAR
First colours	Second colours

First international
- Morocco 2–0 Tunisia (Rabat, Morocco; 6 September 1960)

Biggest win
- Morocco 6–0 Malaysia (Ingolstadt, West Germany; 31 August 1972) Morocco 6–0 Egypt (Nantes, France; 8 August 2024)

Biggest defeat
- Hungary 6–0 Morocco (Tokyo, Japan; 11 October 1964); Records for competitive matches only.

Olympic Games
- Appearances: 8 (first in 1964)
- Best result: (bronze) Bronze medal (2024)

U-23 Africa Cup of Nations
- Appearances: 2 (first in 2011)
- Best result: Champions (2023)
Medal record
Olympic Games
Bronze medal – third place	2024 Paris
Africa Cup of Nations
Gold medal – first place	2023 Morocco
Silver medal – second place	2011 Morocco
Islamic Solidarity Games
Silver medal – second place	2005 Saudi Arabia

The Morocco national under-23 football team, also known as the Morocco Olympic football team, represents Morocco in international football competitions such as the Olympic Games. The selection is limited to players under the age of 23, except during the Olympic Games where up to three overage players is allowed. The team is controlled by the Royal Moroccan Football Federation.

== History ==
=== Summer Olympics (1964–2004) ===
Morocco's first appearance was in the 1964 Summer Olympics in Tokyo. In a group that consisted of three teams following North Korea's withdrawal. They suffered a heavy 0-6 defeat to Hungary - Morocco's all-time heaviest defeat to date -, then lost 1-3 to Yugoslavia and were eliminated.

Their second appearance was supposed to be during the 1968 Summer Olympics in Mexico but Morocco refused to allow its team to play against Israel in Group C due to political issues. They were eventually replaced by Ghana which lost 2-3 on aggregate to Morocco in the last qualifying round.

In the 1972 edition in Munich, Morocco reached the second round as runners-up in their group with 3 points following a goalless draw against the United States, a resounding 6-0 win against Malaysia and a 0-3 loss to hosts West Germany. In the second round, The Atlas Lions lost all three games against Denmark, Poland and the Soviet Union. However, it was the best performance of the Atlas Lions at the Olympic football tournament until 2024.

Morocco came extremely close to reaching the quarter-finals in the 2004 Summer Olympics, narrowly missing out on goals scored that favored Costa Rica. Morocco were 2-1 ahead in their final group game against already-qualified Iraq thanks to goals scored by Bouabid Bouden and Salaheddine Aqqal. However, in the other game, Costa Rica's Pablo Brenes scored the fourth goal in added time to seal a 4-2 win over Portugal and qualification at Morocco's expense.

=== First Continental Final ===
During the inaugural 2011 CAF U-23 Championship held in Morocco. The host nation coached by Pim Verbeek, recorded narrow 1-0 victories against both Nigeria and Algeria, before losing to Senegal. In the semi-finals, Morocco successfully secured a spot in the 2012 Summer Olympics in London by defeating Egypt 3-2 in a tense game which also saw Abdelaziz Barrada scoring the fastest goal in the history of the tournament to date after just 30 seconds. This marked the return of the Atlas Lions to the Olympic football tournament having missed out on qualifying in 2008. However, they faced a setback when they suffered a 2-1 defeat against the surprising contender, Gabon, in the final held at the Marrakech Stadium.

=== Golden generation (2022–) ===
On 7 July 2022, Morocco were awarded the hosting rights of the 2023 U-23 Africa Cup of Nations, marking the return of the U-23 team to the competition for the first time in 12 years. Their campaign kicked off on a positive note with a hard-fought 2-1 victory against Guinea, followed by a resounding 5-1 triumph over Ghana, emerging as group winners and securing a place in the semifinals with one game to spare. They went on to win the semi-final against Mali and qualify for the 2024 Olympic Games. They defeated Egypt 2-1 in the final to win their first ever continental title. The team was congratulated by King Mohammed VI for their achievement.

On 29 February 2024, Tarik Sektioui was appointed head coach of the men's Olympic squad by the Royal Moroccan Football Federation. In Paris 2024, Morocco debuted in group B with a 2–1 victory against Argentina, followed by a 2–1 defeat against Ukraine and a 3–0 victory against Iraq. Topping their group with six points ahead of Argentina on the head-to-head record, Morocco thus reached the knockout stage for the first time since 1972. They defeated the United States 4-0 in the quarterfinals, reaching the semifinals for the first time ever. In the semifinal, Morocco lost 2–1 against Spain. They then won 6–0 against Egypt in the third place to win the bronze medal.

== Results and fixtures ==
Legend

Win Draw Lose Voided or Postponed Fixture

== Coaching staff ==
Position	Name
Head coach	(Morocco) Tarik Sektioui
Assistant coach(es)	(Morocco) Youssouf Hadji
Assistant coach(es)	(Morocco) Fahd El Ouarga
Fitness coach	(France) Grégory Delhomel
Goalkeeping coach	(Belgium) Laurent Deraedt
Technical director	(Belgium) Chris Van Puyvelde
Video analyst	(France) Damien Januel

== Players ==
=== Current squad ===
The following players have been called up for the friendly matches against Mali and Tanzania on 1 and 5 October 2026.

Caps and goals correct as of 1 October 2026, after the match against Maly.

No.	Pos.	Player	Date of birth (age)	Caps	Goals	Club
1	GK	Yanis Benchaouch	10 April 2006 (age 20)	2	0	(French Football Federation) Red Star
12	GK	Hakim Mesbahi	7 September 2005 (age 21)	0	0	(Royal Moroccan Football Federation) AS FAR
22	GK	Ibrahim Gomis	20 March 2005 (age 21)	0	0	(French Football Federation) Marseille
	GK	Aymean el Hani	9 May 2007 (age 19)	1	0	(Royal Dutch Football Association) Ajax
2	DF	Hamza Koutoune	17 September 2006 (age 20)	1	0	(French Football Federation) Nice
3	DF	Youssef Enríquez	7 October 2005 (age 21)	3	0	(Royal Spanish Football Federation) Deportivo Alavés
4	DF	Ismaël Baouf	17 September 2006 (age 20)	1	0	(Royal Dutch Football Association) Cambuur
15	DF	Fouad Zahouani	18 April 2006 (age 20)	3	0	(Royal Dutch Football Association) Ajax
17	DF	Ilyass Mahsoub	19 May 2006 (age 20)	0	0	(Royal Moroccan Football Federation) RS Berkane
20	DF	Mohammed Kebdani	13 May 2006 (age 20)	1	0	(Portuguese Football Federation) Vitória de Guimarães
23	DF	Kaïs Barry	8 February 2006 (age 20)	0	0	(Royal Belgian Football Association) Anderlecht
24	DF	Adam Bakoune	6 February 2006 (age 20)	1	0	(Italian Football Federation) Monza
29	DF	Faissal Al Mazyani	18 January 2005 (age 21)	2	0	(Royal Dutch Football Association) Waalwijk
5	MF	Reda Laalaoui	11 May 2005 (age 21)	1	0	(Royal Belgian Football Association) Westerlo
6	MF	Anas Tajaouart	7 September 2005 (age 21)	0	0	(Royal Belgian Football Association) La Louvière
8	MF	Hossam Essadak	30 July 2005 (age 21)	2	0	(Saudi Arabian Football Federation) Al-Fateh
10	MF	Chamsedin Kouranfal	3 December 2005 (age 20)	0	0	(French Football Federation) Reims
18	MF	Yassine Khalifi	9 August 2005 (age 21)	3	0	(Royal Belgian Football Association) Royal Charleroi
	MF	Saad El Haddad	24 July 2005 (age 21)	1	0	(Croatian Football Federation) Rudeš
	MF	Rafik El Arguioui	31 July 2005 (age 21)	0	0	(Royal Dutch Football Association) Cambuur
7	FW	Othmane Maamma	6 October 2005 (age 21)	1	0	(The Football Association) Watford
9	FW	Younes El Bahraoui	4 January 2005 (age 21)	2	0	(Saudi Arabian Football Federation) Al-Taawoun
11	FW	Ilias Boumassaoudi	14 January 2005 (age 21)	1	0	(Royal Dutch Football Association) Den Bosch
16	FW	Ilyes Housni	14 May 2005 (age 21)	1	0	(French Football Federation) Nancy
25	FW	Amir Bouhamdi	17 June 2008 (age 18)	1	1	(Royal Dutch Football Association) PSV Eindhoven
26	FW	Elyess Dao	20 November 2006 (age 19)	2	0	(Royal Belgian Football Association) Anderlecht
27	FW	Adam Boayar	13 October 2005 (age 21)	0	0	(Royal Spanish Football Federation) Elche
28	FW	Abdelhamid Maali	16 March 2006 (age 20)	1	0	(Royal Moroccan Football Federation) IR Tangier
	FW	Jones El-Abdellaoui	12 January 2006 (age 20)	2	0	(Royal Spanish Football Federation) Celta Vigo

=== Recent call-ups ===
The following players have been called up for the team within the last 12 months and are still available for selection.

Pos.	Player	Date of birth (age)	Caps	Goals	Club	Latest call-up
DF	Ali Maamar	23 March 2005 (age 21)	2	0	(Belgium) Anderlecht	v. Ivory Coast, 30 March 2026
DF	Amine Chabane	15 August 2006 (age 20)	0	0	(France) Amiens	v. Ivory Coast, 30 March 2026
DF	Adam Aznou	2 June 2006 (age 20)	2	1	(England) Everton	v. Ivory Coast, 30 March 2026
DF	Taha Majni	11 October 2007 (age 19)	2	0	(Morocco) UTS Rabat	v. Ivory Coast, 30 March 2026
DF	Omar Achouitar	13 May 2005 (age 21)	0	0	(Netherlands) Vitesse	v. Ivory Coast, 30 March 2026
DF	Abdelhamid Aït Boudlal	16 April 2006 (age 20)	1	0	(France) Rennes	v. Ivory Coast, 30 March 2026
MF	Naïm Byar	23 February 2005 (age 21)	1	0	(Morocco) Wydad AC	v. Ivory Coast, 30 March 2026
MF	Adam Tahaui	21 July 2005 (age 21)	1	0	(Netherlands) Vitesse	v. Ivory Coast, 30 March 2026
MF	Abdellah Ouazane	15 January 2009 (age 17)	1	0	(Netherlands) Ajax	v. Ivory Coast, 30 March 2026
MF	Youssef Hamdaoui	20 March 2008 (age 18)	2	0	(Belgium) Royal Antwerp	v. Ivory Coast, 30 March 2026
FW	Mouad Dahak	22 July 2005 (age 21)	2	1	(Morocco) Raja CA	v. Ivory Coast, 30 March 2026
FW	Yusuf Akhamrich	5 September 2005 (age 21)	0	0	(England) Bristol Rovers	v. Ivory Coast, 30 March 2026
FW	Sami Bouhoudane	13 January 2008 (age 18)	1	0	(Netherlands) PSV Eindhoven	v. Ivory Coast, 30 March 2026
FW	Ali Houary	5 August 2005 (age 21)	1	0	(Spain) Mirandés	v. Ivory Coast, 30 March 2026
FW	Yassir Zabiri	23 February 2005 (age 21)	1	0	(France) Rennes	v. Ivory Coast, 30 March 2026
FW	Ayman Arguigue	11 May 2005 (age 21)	0	0	(Spain) Villarreal	v. Ivory Coast, 30 March 2026
Notes: ^{PRE} = Preliminary squad/standby.

=== Previous squads ===
Football at the Summer Olympics squads

- Olympics 1992 squad
- Olympics 2000 squad
- Olympics 2004 squad
- Olympics 2012 squad
- Olympics 2024 squad

U-23 Africa Cup of Nations squads

- CAF U-23 2011 squad
- AFCON U-23 2023 squad

Football at the Islamic Solidarity Games

- Islamic Games 2005
- Islamic Games 2013
- Islamic Games 2017
- Islamic Games 2021

=== Overage players in Olympic Games ===
Tournament	Player 1	Player 2	Player 3
2000	El Houssaine Ouchla (DF)	Adel Chbouki (MF)	Salaheddine Bassir (FW)
2004	Nadir Lamyaghri (GK)	Otmane El Assas (MF)	Bouchaib El Moubarki (FW)
2012	Houssine Kharja (MF)	Nordin Amrabat (FW)	did not select
2024	Munir Mohamedi (GK)	Achraf Hakimi (DF)	Soufiane Rahimi (FW)

== Competitive record ==
=== Olympic Games ===
Olympic Games record
Year	Round	Position	Pld	W	D	L	GF	GA
Until 1988	See Morocco national football team							
(Spain) 1992	Group stage	15th	3	0	1	2	2	8
(United States) 1996	Did not qualify							
(Australia) 2000	Group stage	16th	3	0	0	3	1	7
(Greece) 2004	Group stage	10th	3	1	1	1	3	3
(China) 2008	Did not qualify							
(United Kingdom) 2012	Group stage	11th	3	0	2	1	2	3
(Brazil) 2016	Did not qualify							
(Japan) 2020	Did not qualify							
(France) 2024	Bronze medal	3rd	6	4	0	2	17	5
(United States) 2028	To be determined							
(Australia) 2032	To be determined							
Total	Bronze medal	5/9	18	5	4	9	25	26

- Prior to the Barcelona 1992 campaign, the Football at the Summer Olympics was open to full senior national teams.

=== U-23 Africa Cup of Nations ===
U-23 Africa Cup of Nations record
Appearances: 2
Year	Round	Pld	W	D	L	GF	GA
(Morocco) 2011	Runners-up	5	3	0	2	6	5
(Senegal) 2015	Did not qualify						
(Egypt) 2019	Did not qualify						
(Morocco) 2023	Champions	5	4	1	0	12	5
Total	2/4	10	7	1	2	18	10

=== UNAF U-23 Tournament ===
UNAF U-23 Tournament record
Appearances: 3 / 4
Year	Round	Position	Pld	W	D	L	GF	GA
(Libya) 2006	Did not enter							
(Tunisia) 2007	Third place	3rd	2	1	1	0	2	0
(Morocco) 2010	Runners-up	2nd	3	2	0	1	6	3
(Morocco) 2011	Third place	3rd	2	0	1	1	1	2
(Algeria) 2015	Cancelled							
Total	Runners-up	3/4	7	3	2	2	9	5

=== Islamic Solidarity Games ===
Islamic Solidarity Games record
Year	Round	Position	Pld	W	D	L	GF	GA
(Saudi Arabia) 2005	Silver Medal	2nd	5	2	2	1	4	2
(Iran) 2010	Cancelled							
(Indonesia) 2013	Gold Medal	1st	4	3	0	1	6	3
(Azerbaijan) 2017	Group stage	5th	3	1	2	0	2	1
(Turkey) 2021	Group stage	5th	3	1	1	1	5	4
(Saudi Arabia) 2025	No football tournament held							
Total	1 title	4/4	15	7	5	3	17	10

== Honours ==
Intercontinental

- Football at the Summer Olympics

(bronze) Bronze medal (1): 2024

Continental

- U-23 Africa Cup of Nations

(gold) Winners (1): 2023
(silver) Runners-up (1): 2011

Other

- UNAF U-23 Tournament

(silver) Runners-up (1): 2010
(bronze) Third Place (2): 2007, 2011

- Islamic Solidarity Games

(silver) Runners-up (1): 2005

- Toulon tournament

(silver) Runners-up (1): 2015

== See also ==
- Morocco national football team
- Morocco national under-20 football team
- Morocco national under-17 football team
