= Football at the 2007 All-Africa Games – Men's tournament =

2007 Men's All-Africa Games football tournament
Tournament details
- Host country: Algeria
- City: Algiers
- Dates: 10–23 July
- Teams: 8 (from 1 confederation)
- Venues: 5 (in 5 host cities)

Final positions
- Champions: Cameroon (4th title)
- Runners-up: Guinea
- Third place: Tunisia
- Fourth place: Zambia

Tournament statistics
- Matches played: 16
- Goals scored: 35 (2.19 per match)

The 2007 All-Africa Games football – Men's tournament was the 9th edition of the African Games men's football tournament for men. The football tournament was held in Algiers, Algeria between 10–23 July 2007 as part of the 2007 All-Africa Games. The tournament was age-restricted and open to men's under-23 national teams.

== Qualification ==
The following eight teams qualified for the final tournament.

Zone	Team	Appearance	Previous best performance
Hosts	Algeria	7th	Gold medal (1978)
Zone I	Tunisia	3rd	Silver medal (1991)
Zone II	Guinea	3rd	Silver medal (1973)
Zone III	Ghana	4th	Bronze medal (1978, 2003)
Zone IV	Cameroon	6th	Gold medal (1991, 1999, 2003)
Zone V	Egypt	7th	Gold medal (1987, 1995)
Zone VI	South Africa	3rd	Bronze medal (1999)
Zone VI	Zambia	4th	Silver medal (1999)
Zone VII	no team		

== Final tournament ==
All times given as local time (UTC+1)

=== Group stage ===
Key to colours in group tables
Teams that advanced to the semifinals

==== Group A ====
Pos	Team	Pld	W	D	L	GF	GA	GD	Pts	Qualification
1	Cameroon	3	2	1	0	3	0	+3	7	Knockout stage
2	Tunisia	3	1	2	0	3	2	+1	5	Knockout stage
3	South Africa	3	1	0	2	3	4	−1	3	
4	Ghana	3	0	1	2	1	4	−3	1	

10 July 2007

Ghana	0–1	Cameroon
		Bekamenga 65'

Djilali Bounaama Stadium, Boumerdès

10 July 2007

South Africa	1–2	Tunisia
Maluleke 3'		Mouihbi 14'; Younes 81'

Salem Mabrouki Stadium, Rouïba

13 July 2007

Cameroon	0–0	Tunisia

Djilali Bounaama Stadium, Boumerdès

13 July 2007

Ghana	0–2	South Africa
Motha 25'; Maluleka 44'

Salem Mabrouki Stadium, Rouïba

16 July 2007

Cameroon	2–0	South Africa
Toindouba 2', 26'

Djilali Bounaama Stadium, Boumerdès

16 July 2007

Tunisia	1–1	Ghana
Karim 20'		Allan 23'

Salem Mabrouki Stadium, Rouïba

==== Group B ====
Pos	Team	Pld	W	D	L	GF	GA	GD	Pts	Qualification
1	Guinea	3	2	1	0	6	4	+2	7	Knockout stage
2	Zambia	3	1	2	0	5	3	+2	5	Knockout stage
3	Algeria (H)	3	1	1	1	4	4	0	4	
4	Egypt	3	0	0	3	4	8	−4	0	

(H) Hosts
10 July 2007

Guinea	1–1	Zambia
Bangoura 59'		Singuluma 75'

Koléa Olympic Stadium, Koléa

10 July 2007

Algeria	2–1	Egypt
Bouguèche 66'; Younès 82'		El Halwani 69'

Mustapha Tchaker Stadium, Blida

13 July 2007

Zambia	3–1	Egypt
Sunzu 14'; Mbewe 35'; Chibambo 51'		I. Mohamed 74'

Koléa Olympic Stadium, Koléa

13 July 2007

Guinea	2–1	Algeria
Bangoura 52'; I. Camara 88'		Aoudia 36'

Mustapha Tchaker Stadium, Blida

16 July 2007

Zambia	1–1	Algeria
Musonda 90+'		Aoudia 44'

Koléa Olympic Stadium, Koléa

16 July 2007

Egypt	2–3	Guinea
El-Weshi 4', 68'		M. Camara 78'; C. Camara 79'; Bangoura 86'

Mustapha Tchaker Stadium, Blida

=== Knockout stage ===
==== Bracket ====
Semi-finals
19 July – Boumerdes
Cameroon	2
Zambia	1
19 July – Blida
Guinea	1
Tunisia	0

Gold medal match
22 July – Alger
Cameroon	1
Guinea	0
Bronze medal match
22 July – Boumerdes
Zambia	0
Tunisia	1

==== Semifinals ====
19 July 2007

Cameroon	2–1	Zambia
Njembe 50'; Bekamenga 56' (pen.)		Bwalya 90+2'

Djilali Bounaama Stadium, Boumerdès

19 July 2007

Guinea	1–0	Tunisia

Mustapha Tchaker Stadium, Blida

==== Third-place match ====
22 July 2007

Zambia	0–1	Tunisia
		Maatouk 73'

Djilali Bounaama Stadium, Boumerdès

==== Final ====
23 July 2007

Cameroon	1–0	Guinea
Otobong 51'	Report

Mustapha Tchaker Stadium, Blida
Attendance: 5,000
Referee: Mohamed Benaissa (Algeria)

== Final ranking ==
Pos	Team	Pld	W	D	L	GF	GA	GD	Pts	Final result
1st place, gold medalist(s)	Cameroon	5	4	1	0	6	1	+5	13	Gold Medal
2nd place, silver medalist(s)	Guinea	5	3	1	1	7	5	+2	10	Silver Medal
3rd place, bronze medalist(s)	Tunisia	5	2	2	1	4	3	+1	8	Bronze Medal
4	Zambia	5	1	2	2	6	6	0	5	Fourth place
5	Algeria (H)	3	1	1	1	4	4	0	4	Eliminated in group stage
6	South Africa	3	1	0	2	3	4	−1	3	Eliminated in group stage
7	Ghana	3	0	1	2	1	4	−3	1	Eliminated in group stage
8	Egypt	3	0	0	3	4	8	−4	0	Eliminated in group stage

Source: todor66
(H) Hosts

== See also ==
- Football at the 2007 All-Africa Games – Women's tournament
