= Tunisia national under-23 football team =

Tunisia U-23
- Nickname(s): نسور قرطاج (Eagles of Carthage)
- Association: Tunisian Football Federation
- Other affiliation: UAFA (Arab World)
- Confederation: CAF (Africa)
- Sub-confederation: UNAF (North Africa)
- Head coach: Anis Boujelbene
- Home stadium: Hammadi Agrebi Stadium
- FIFA code: TUN
First colours	Second colours	Third colours

First international
- Malta 0–0 Tunisia (Valletta, Malta; 1 November 1959)

Biggest win
- Tunisia 4–0 Mali (Tunis, Tunisia; 28 May 1972)

Biggest defeat
- Poland 6–1 Tunisia (Rome, Italy; 26 August 1960)

Summer Olympics
- Appearances: 2 (first in 1996)
- Best result: Group Stage (1996, 2004)

U-23 Africa Cup of Nations
- Appearances: 1 (first in 2015)
- Best result: Group stage (2015)

UNAF U-23 Tournament
- Appearances: 2 (first in 2006)
- Best result: Runners-up (2007)

The Tunisia national under-23 football team has represented Tunisia in men's international association football for players aged 23 or under. The team is administered by the Tunisian Football Federation (TFF), which governs football in Tunisia. On a continental level, the team competes under the Confederation of African Football (CAF), which governs associate football in Africa, and is also affiliated with FIFA for global competitions. Additionally, the team is a member of the Union of North African Football (UNAF) and the Union of Arab Football Associations (UAFA). The team is colloquially known as Eagles of Carthage by fans and the media, with the bald eagle serving as its symbol. Their home kit is primarily white and their away kit is red, which is a reference to the national flag of the country. Anis Boujelbene is the current head coach.

Since the football tournament of the Olympic Games were limited to under-23 teams, Tunisia has qualified twice for the event in Atlanta 1996 and Athens 2004 and was eliminated in the group stage in both appearances. Tunisia qualified for the African Games twice, winning a silver medal in 1991 and a bronze medal in 2007. Tunisia qualified for the U-23 Africa Cup of Nations for the first time in 2015, the team eliminated from the group stage, since then Tunisia has not qualified again. The team participated twice in the UNAF U-23 Tournament, finishing fourth in 2006 and second in 2007. He also participated once in the Maurice Revello Tournament in 2026, finishing in second place after a 2–0 defeat to Portugal in the final.

== Players ==
=== Notable players ===
- Ali Zitouni

=== Previous squads ===
Tunisia Olympic Squads

- 1996 Summer Olympics
- 2004 Summer Olympics

Tunisia CAF U23 Squads

- 2015 Africa U-23 Cup of Nations

=== Overage players in Olympic Games ===
Tournament	Player 1	Player 2	Player 3
1996	Chokri El Ouaer (GK)	did not select	
2004	Khaled Fadhel (GK)	José Clayton (DF)	Mohamed Jedidi (MF)

== Competitive record ==
Champions Runners-up Third place Fourth place

- Red border color indicates tournament was held on home soil.

=== Summer Olympics ===
Summer Olympics record
Year	Round	Position	Pld	W	D*	L	GF	GA
1896–1988	See Tunisia national football team							
(Spain) 1992	Did not qualify							
(United States) 1996	Group stage	14th	3	0	1	2	1	5
(Australia) 2000	Did not qualify							
(Greece) 2004	Group stage	12th	3	1	1	1	4	5
(China) 2008	Did not qualify							
(United Kingdom) 2012	Did not qualify							
(Brazil) 2016	Did not qualify							
(Japan) 2020	Did not qualify							
(France) 2024	Did not qualify							
(United States) 2028	To be determined							
(Australia) 2032	To be determined							
Total	Group stage	2/7	6	1	2	3	5	10

=== African Games ===
African Games record
Year	Round	Position	Pld	W	D*	L	GF	GA
1965–1987	See Tunisia national football team							
(Egypt) 1991	Runners-up	2nd	5	3	1	1	7	2
(Zimbabwe) 1995	Did not qualify							
(South Africa) 1999	Did not qualify							
(Nigeria) 2003	Did not qualify							
(Algeria) 2007	Third Place	3rd	5	2	2	1	4	3
(Mozambique) 2011	Did not qualify							
(Ghana) 2015	Did not qualify							
Since 2019	See Tunisia national under-20 football team							
Total	Runners-up	2/7	10	5	3	2	11	5

=== U-23 Africa Cup of Nations ===
U-23 Africa Cup of Nations record
Year	Round	Position	Pld	W	D*	L	GF	GA
(Morocco) 2011	Did not qualify							
(Senegal) 2015	Group stage	6th	3	1	0	2	2	4
(Egypt) 2019	Did not qualify							
(Morocco) 2023	Did not qualify							
Total	Group stage	1/4	3	1	0	2	2	4

=== UNAF U-23 Tournament ===
UNAF U-23 Tournament record
Year	Round	Position	Pld	W	D*	L	GF	GA
(Libya) 2006	Fourth Place	4th	3	0	2	1	4	6
(Tunisia) 2007	Runners-up	2nd	2	1	1	9	2	0
(Morocco) 2010	Did not enter							
(Morocco) 2011	Did not enter							
(Algeria) 2015	Cancelled							
Total	Runners-up	2/4	5	1	3	10	6	6

=== Minior competitions ===
Minior competitions record
Year	Round	Position	Pld	W	D*	L	GF	GA
(France) 2026 Maurice Revello Tournament	Runners-up	2nd	4	2	1	1	7	3

== Honours ==
- African Games

(silver) Runners up (1): 1991
(bronze) Third Place (1): 2007

- UNAF U-23 Tournament

(silver) Runners up (1): 2007

- Maurice Revello Tournament

(silver) Runners up (1): 2026

== See also ==
- Tunisia national football team
- Tunisia A' national football team
- Tunisia national under-20 football team
- Tunisia national under-18 football team
- Tunisia national under-17 football team
- Tunisia national under-15 football team
