= Abdelaziz Ali Guechi =

Algerian association football player (born 1990)

Personal information
- Full name: Abdelaziz Ali Guechi
- Date of birth: 1 November 1990 (age 36)
- Place of birth: Annaba, Algeria
- Height: 1.90 m (6 ft 3 in)
- Position: Defender

Senior career*
Years	Team	Apps	(Gls)
2009–2012	USM Annaba	41	(3)
2012–2014	CABBA	40	(1)
2014–2015	RC Arbaâ	7	(0)
2014–2015	USM El Harrach	8	(0)
2015–2016	ASM Oran	11	(0)
2016–2018	AS Gabès	48	(10)
2019	MO Béjaïa	7	(0)
2019	Al-Adalah	11	(0)
2020–2021	US Tataouine	1	(0)
2021	Al-Thoqbah		

International career^{‡}
2010–2013	Algeria U23	13	(1)
- * Club domestic league appearances and goals as of 19:52, 16 November 2018 (UTC) ‡ National team caps and goals as of 19:52, 16 May 2018 (UTC)

Abdelaziz Ali Guechi (born 1 November 1990) is an Algerian footballer who plays as a defender.

== International career ==
Ali Guechi was called up to participate in the 2010 UNAF U-23 Tournament. On 15 December 2010, he scored the first goal against the Moroccan under-23 side. On 16 November 2011, he was selected as part of Algeria's squad for the 2011 CAF U-23 Championship in Morocco.

== Statistics ==
Club performance			League		Cup		Continental		Total	
Season	Club	League	Apps	Goals	Apps	Goals	Apps	Goals	Apps	Goals
Algeria			League		Algerian Cup		League Cup		Total	
2009-10	USM Annaba	Championnat National	22	1	2	0	0	0	24	1
2010-11	USM Annaba	Ligue 1	11	1	0	0	0	0	11	1
Total	Algeria		33	2	2	0	0	0	35	2
Career total			33	2	2	0	0	0	35	2
