= Redwan Al-Mousa =

Saudi Arabian footballer

Personal information
- Full name: Redwan Sadiq Al-Mousa
- Date of birth: September 13, 1990 (age 36)
- Place of birth: Saudi Arabia
- Height: 1.86 m (6 ft 1 in)
- Position: Defender

Senior career*
Years	Team	Apps	(Gls)
2010–2013	Al-Hilal	1	(0)
2012–2013	→ Al-Shoalah (loan)	1	(0)
2014–2016	Al-Ansar		
2017–2018	Al-Nakhil		
2018–2019	Afif		

International career
2009–2010	Saudi Arabia U20	4	
2011–	Saudi Arabia U23	2	
- * Club domestic league appearances and goals

Redwan Al-Mousa is a Saudi Arabian footballer who plays as a defender, most recently for Afif.

== Honours ==
=== Club ===
Al-Hilal

- Saudi Professional League (1): 2010-11
- Crown Prince Cup (2): 2010-11, 2011-12

=== Country ===
Saudi Arabia U-23

- UNAF U-23 Tournament (1): 2011
