= UNAF U-23 Tournament =

- Organiser(s): UNAF
- Founded: 2006; 20 years ago
- Region: North Africa
- Teams: 5 (plus guests)
- Current champions: Saudi Arabia (1st title)
- Most championships: Algeria (2 titles)
- Website: unafonline.org

The UNAF U-23 Tournament is an international youth football tournament organized by the Union of North African Football (UNAF) for its nations consisting of players under the age of 23. However, the tournament invites teams from other nations.

== History ==
The first edition was held on 2006 in Libya. The 2015 tournament was originally planned from 8 to 16 January in the Ahmed Zabana Stadium in Oran, Algeria. However it was postponed to a later date on first, and after canceled, after the withdrawal of Egypt, Libya and Morocco. No tournaments was played after.

== Results ==
| Ed. | Year | Host | First place game | | | Third place game | | |
| Ed. | Year | Host | (gold) Champion | Score | (silver) Runner-up | (bronze) Third place | Score | Fourth place |
|---|---|---|---|---|---|---|---|---|
| 1 | 2006 | Libya | Libya | round-robin | Algeria | Egypt | round-robin | Tunisia |
| 2 | 2007 | Tunisia | Algeria | 0–0 (4–2 p) | Tunisia | Morocco | 2–0 | Libya |
| 3 | 2010 | Morocco | Algeria | round-robin | Morocco | Cameroon | round-robin | Libya |
| 4 | 2011 | Morocco | Saudi Arabia | round-robin | Algeria | Morocco | round-robin | Niger |
| — | 2015 | Algeria | Cancelled | | | Cancelled | | |

== Statistics ==
=== Summary ===
| Team | Winners | Runners-up | Third place | Fourth place |
|---|---|---|---|---|
| Algeria | 2 (2007, 2010) | 2 (2006, 2011) | — | — |
| Libya | 1 (2006*) | — | — | 1 (2007, 2010) |
| Saudi Arabia | 1 (2011) | — | — | — |
| Morocco | — | 1 (2010*) | 2 (2007, 2011*) | — |
| Tunisia | — | 1 (2007*) | — | 1 (2006) |
| Egypt | — | — | 1 (2006) | — |
| Cameroon | — | — | 1 (2010) | — |
| Niger | — | — | — | 1 (2011) |

* Hosts
Italic Invited nation

=== Participating nations ===
| Team | (Libya) 2006 | (Tunisia) 2007 | (Morocco) 2010 | (Morocco) 2011 | (Algeria) ~~2015~~ | Apps. |
|---|---|---|---|---|---|---|
| Algeria | 2nd | 1st | 1st | 2nd | ~~Q~~ | 4 |
| Egypt | 3rd | × | × | × | ~~Q~~ | 1 |
| Libya | 1st | 4th | 4th | × | ~~Q~~ | 3 |
| Morocco | × | 3rd | 2nd | 3rd | ~~Q~~ | 3 |
| Tunisia | 4th | 2nd | × | × | ~~Q~~ | 2 |
Invited nations
| Cameroon | | | 3rd | | | 1 |
| Niger | | | | 4th | | 1 |
| Saudi Arabia | | | | 1st | | 1 |

- 1st – Champions
- 2nd – Runners-up
- 3rd – Third place
- 4th – Fourth place
- Q – Qualified for upcoming tournament
- × — Did not enter / Withdrew / Disqualified
- — Hosts

== See also ==
- UNAF U-20 Tournament
- UNAF U-18 Tournament
- UNAF U-17 Tournament
- UNAF U-16 Tournament
- UNAF U-15 Tournament
