= 2007 UNAF U-23 Tournament =

Tournament details
- Country: Tunisia
- Dates: 10–12 Novembre
- Teams: 4

Final positions
- Champions: Algeria (1st title)
- Runners-up: Tunisia
- Third place: Morocco

Tournament statistics
- Matches played: 4
- Goals scored: 4 (1 per match)

The 2007 UNAF U-23 Tournament was the 2nd edition of the UNAF U-23 Tournament. The tournament took place in Tunisia, between 10 and 11 November 2007.

== Participants ==
- Algeria
- Libya (Holders)
- Morocco
- Tunisia (Hosts)

== Tournament ==
=== Bracket ===
Semi-finals
10 November – Tunis
Tunisia	2
Libya	0
10 November – Tunis
Morocco	0 (5)
Algeria (pen.)	0 (6)

Final
12 November – Tunis
Tunisia	0 (2)
Algeria (pen.)	0 (4)
Third place
12 November – Tunis
Morocco	2
Libya	0

=== Semi-finals ===
10 November 2007
15:00

Tunisia	2–0	Libya
	Report

Tunis

10 November 2007
15:00

Morocco	0–0	Algeria
	Report
Penalties
	5–6

Tunis

=== Third-place match ===
12 November 2007
15:00

Morocco	2–0	Libya
	Report

Tunis

=== Final ===
12 November 2007
18:00

Tunisia	0–0	Algeria
	Report
Penalties
	2–4

Tunis
