= Football at the 2021 Islamic Solidarity Games – Men's team squads =

The football tournament at the 2021 Islamic Solidarity Games took place during 8-16 August 2021. Each participating nation's football association selected 23 players for the tournament.

== Group A ==
=== Algeria ===
Head coach: Noureddine Ould Ali

No.	Pos.	Player	Date of birth (age)	Caps	Goals	Club
1	GK	Redouane Maachou	4 February 2001 (aged 21)	0	0	(Algerian Football Federation) CR Belouizdad
2	DF	Mohamed Azzi	11 May 2002 (aged 20)	0	0	(Algerian Football Federation) CR Belouizdad
3	DF	Chemseddine Bekkouche	13 March 2001 (aged 21)	0	0	(Algerian Football Federation) CR Belouizdad
4	DF	Imad Reguieg	2 June 2002 (aged 20)	0	0	(Algerian Football Federation) MC Oran
5	DF	Boubakar Baouche		0	0	(Algerian Football Federation) MC Saïda
6	MF	Aymen Bendaoud	18 June 2001 (aged 21)	0	0	(Algerian Football Federation) CS Constantine
7	FW	Abderraouf Othmani	14 June 2001 (aged 21)	0	0	(Algerian Football Federation) USM Alger
8	FW	Massinissa Nait Salem	30 April 2001 (aged 21)	0	0	(Algerian Football Federation) JS Kabylie
9	MF	Mohamed Aït El Hadj	22 March 2002 (aged 20)	0	0	(Algerian Football Federation) USM Alger
10	FW	Mohamed Islam Belkhir	16 March 2001 (aged 21)	0	0	(Algerian Football Federation) CR Belouizdad
11	FW	Fodil Belkhadem	25 January 2002 (aged 20)	0	0	(Algerian Football Federation) CR Belouizdad
12	FW	Mounder Temine	15 September 2001 (aged 20)	0	0	(Algerian Football Federation) CS Constantine
13	DF	Toufik Cherifi	19 October 2001 (aged 20)	0	0	(Tunisian Football Federation) Club Africain
14	DF	Fares Nechat Djabri	25 May 2001 (aged 21)	0	0	(Algerian Football Federation) JS Kabylie
15	DF	Zouheyr Benyoub	28 February 2002 (aged 20)	0	0	(Algerian Football Federation) HB Chelghoum Laïd
16	GK	Amine Yaacoubi	2 November 2002 (aged 19)	0	0	(Algerian Football Federation) MC Alger
17	MF	Boualem Sryer	8 June 2001 (aged 21)	0	0	(Algerian Football Federation) ASO Chlef
18	MF	Imad Bennara		0	0	(Algerian Football Federation) JS Kabylie
19	DF	Naïm Laidouni (captain)	24 September 2002 (aged 19)	0	0	(French Football Federation) Clermont Foot
20	DF	Abdelhamid Driss	12 February 2002 (aged 20)	0	0	(Algerian Football Federation) NC Magra
21	MF	Akram Bouras	23 February 2002 (aged 20)	0	0	(Algerian Football Federation) CR Belouizdad
22	MF	Mohamed El Badaoui	20 February 2001 (aged 21)	0	0	(Algerian Football Federation) JS Saoura
23	GK	Mohamed Hamidi		0	0	(Algerian Football Federation) NC Magra

=== Cameroon ===
Head coach: -

- Yene Mbarga Arthur
- Franklin Lincoln Banmassa
- Karim Bello
- Sack Bouget
- Atangana Marc Dynam
- Ismael Michel Nwoagou Fansu
- Roche Foning
- Ali Goni
- Djonkep Harrison
- Tchikeu Paul Henri
- Pouakam Hubert
- Junior Sunday Jang
- Noah Tankeuh Yannick Joachim
- Essomba Jordan
- Iyendjock Joseph
- Tchatou Boris Junior
- Souaibou Marou
- Abdoul Aziz Moubarak
- Jean Eric Moursou
- Fils Ndong
- Wislow Hecube Ntone
- Wassou Patient
- Tsiolefack Ygor Rincesse
- Ibrahim Saidou
- Elimbi Samuel
- Onana Severin
- Fognig Sidoine
- Ikpeme Stephan
- Kevin William Temphoun
- Moses Mayenment Yuh

=== Senegal ===
Head coach: -

- Tendeng Etane Junior Aime
- Ndiaye Amadou
- Mane El Hadj Bacary
- Faty Aliou Badara
- Gueye Alioune Badara
- Elhadji Balde
- Assane Diatta
- Abdoulaye Diedhiou
- Ndour Raymond Dieme
- Jean Louis Diouf
- Alassane Faye
- Sambou Bouly Junior
- Camara Lamine
- Badji Landing
- Ndiaye El Hadji Latyr
- Kante Alassane Maodo
- Ndiaye Melo
- Ndiaye Moussa
- Ndiaye Cheikhou Omar
- Sow Ousmane
- Bassene Valere Paul
- Abdou Seydi

=== Turkey ===
Head coach: Mehmet Yıldırım

No.	Pos.	Player	Date of birth (age)	Caps	Goals	Club
1	GK	Batuhan Şen	3 February 1999 (aged 23)	1	0	(Turkish Football Federation) Galatasaray S.K.
2	DF	Tayyip Talha Sanuç	17 December 1999 (aged 22)	3	1	(Turkish Football Federation) Adana Demirspor
3	DF	Ali Eren İyican	26 June 1999 (aged 23)	2	0	(Turkish Football Federation) Bodrum
4	DF	Arda Kızıldağ	15 October 1998 (aged 23)	4	0	(Turkish Football Federation) Gençlerbirliği S.K.
5	MF	Tuğbey Akgün	9 April 2003 (aged 19)	3	0	(Turkish Football Federation) Bursaspor
6	MF	Mehmet Özcan	10 August 1998 (aged 23)	5	0	Free agent
7	FW	Polat Yaldır	17 May 2003 (aged 19)	5	0	(Turkish Football Federation) Samsunspor
8	FW	Umut Nayir (captain)	28 June 1993 (aged 29)	4	0	(Turkish Football Federation) Giresunspor
9	FW	Bertuğ Yıldırım	12 July 2002 (aged 20)	2	0	(Turkish Football Federation) Hatayspor
10	MF	Muhammed Gümüşkaya	1 January 2001 (aged 21)	4	2	(Turkish Football Federation) Fenerbahçe S.K.
11	MF	Eren Karadağ	1 January 2000 (aged 22)	3	1	(Turkish Football Federation) Çaykur Rizespor
12	GK	Canberk Yurdakul	30 April 2001 (aged 21)	1	0	(Turkish Football Federation) Bursaspor
13	MF	Adem Eren Kabak	12 December 2000 (aged 21)	3	0	(Turkish Football Federation) Konyaspor
14	MF	Hakan Yeşil	1 January 2002 (aged 20)	4	0	(Turkish Football Federation) Trabzonspor
15	MF	Selim Dilli	26 May 1998 (aged 24)	2	0	(Turkish Football Federation) Hopaspor
16	DF	İsmail Çokçalış	21 June 2000 (aged 22)	3	0	(Turkish Football Federation) Bursaspor
17	FW	Metehan Altunbaş	7 January 2003 (aged 19)	4	1	(Austrian Football Association) LASK
18	DF	Taha Şahin	22 October 2000 (aged 21)	4	0	(Turkish Football Federation) Manisa F.K.
19	MF	Cihan Kahraman	8 October 1998 (aged 23)	3	0	(Turkish Football Federation) Samsunspor
20	DF	Ahmet Gülay	13 January 2003 (aged 19)	4	0	(Turkish Football Federation) Alanyaspor
21	FW	Eren Aydın	12 February 2003 (aged 19)	5	1	(Turkish Football Federation) Galatasaray S.K.
22	DF	Fatih Kuruçuk	21 January 1998 (aged 24)	4	0	(Turkish Football Federation) Hatayspor
23	GK	Ataberk Dadakdeniz	5 August 1999 (aged 23)	3	0	(Turkish Football Federation) Antalyaspor

== Group B ==
=== Azerbaijan ===
Coach: Emin Imamaliev

The squad was announced on 1 August.

No.	Pos.	Player	Date of birth (age)	Club
1	GK	Rustam Samigullin	23 December 2002 (aged 19)	(Association of Football Federations of Azerbaijan) Sabah
2	DF	David Orucov	5 January 2003 (aged 19)	(Association of Football Federations of Azerbaijan) Neftçi
3	DF	Mirali Ahmadov	16 April 2003 (aged 19)	(Association of Football Federations of Azerbaijan) Shamakhi
4	DF	Cəlal Hüseynov	2 January 2003 (aged 19)	(Association of Football Federations of Azerbaijan) Zira
5	MF	Nazim Hasanzade	27 July 2002 (aged 20)	(Association of Football Federations of Azerbaijan) Turan-Tovuz
6	DF	Shirkhan Hasanzade	20 June 2002 (aged 20)	(Association of Football Federations of Azerbaijan) Qarabağ
7	FW	Jamal Jafarov	25 February 2002 (aged 20)	(Association of Football Federations of Azerbaijan) Sabah
8	MF	Veysal Rzayev	24 October 2002 (aged 19)	(Association of Football Federations of Azerbaijan) Turan-Tovuz
9	FW	Nariman Akhundzade	23 April 2004 (aged 18)	(Association of Football Federations of Azerbaijan) Qarabağ
10	MF	Ismayil Ibrahimli	13 February 1998 (aged 24)	(Association of Football Federations of Azerbaijan) Qarabağ
11	MF	Rufat Abdullazade	17 January 2001 (aged 21)	(Association of Football Federations of Azerbaijan) Sumgayit
12	GK	Rza Jafarov	3 July 2003 (aged 19)	(Association of Football Federations of Azerbaijan) Neftçi
13	DF	Abdulla Rzayev	12 March 2002 (aged 20)	(Association of Football Federations of Azerbaijan) Shamakhi
14	MF	Adilkhan Garahmadov	5 June 2001 (aged 21)	(Association of Football Federations of Azerbaijan) Sabail
15	DF	Nihad Gurbanli	10 April 2001 (aged 21)	(Association of Football Federations of Azerbaijan) Neftçi
16	DF	Ibrahim Ramazanov	10 October 2004 (aged 17)	(Association of Football Federations of Azerbaijan) Gabala
17	MF	Murad Khachayev	14 April 1998 (aged 24)	(Association of Football Federations of Azerbaijan) Sumgayit
18	FW	Mehraj Bakhshali	11 June 2003 (aged 19)	(Association of Football Federations of Azerbaijan) Gabala
19	MF	Samir Abdullayev	27 April 2002 (aged 20)	(Association of Football Federations of Azerbaijan) Sabail
20	MF	Ramin Nasirli	24 September 2002 (aged 19)	(Association of Football Federations of Azerbaijan) Neftçi
21	MF	Samir Maharramli	17 July 2002 (aged 20)	(Association of Football Federations of Azerbaijan) Kapaz
22	GK	Sahib Hasanov	26 October 2004 (aged 17)	(Association of Football Federations of Azerbaijan) Shamakhi
23	MF	Vusal Qanbarov	25 April 2003 (aged 19)	(Association of Football Federations of Azerbaijan) Sabail

=== Iran ===
Head coach: -

- Mohammadmahdi Ahmadi
- Mohammadhosein Alipour Arallou
- Belal Arazi
- Seyedaria Barzegar
- Mohammadhossein Eslami
- Saman Fallahvarnami
- Mohammad Ghorbani
- Mohammadamin Hezbavi
- Alireza Khodaei
- Milad Kor
- Amirmohammad Mohkamkarbadeleh
- Amirhossein Nilpour
- Payam Parsa
- Ali Pilaram
- Fardin Rabet
- Mahdi Hashemnezhad Rahimabadi
- Amirali Sadeghi
- Sina Saeedifar
- Yasin Salmani
- Amir Jafari Seighalani
- Amir Shahim
- Erfan Shahriyarikhalaji
- Arya Yousefi

=== Morocco ===
Coach: Hicham Dmiai

The squad was announced on 27 July.

No.	Pos.	Player	Date of birth (age)	Club
1	GK	El Mehdi Benabid	24 January 1998 (aged 24)	(Royal Moroccan Football Federation) FUS Rabat
2	DF	Hamza Regragui*	13 June 1997 (aged 25)	(Royal Moroccan Football Federation) RS Berkane
3	DF	Mohamed Souboul	17 November 2001 (aged 20)	(Royal Moroccan Football Federation) Raja CA
4	DF	Nabil Marmouk	19 March 1998 (aged 24)	(Royal Moroccan Football Federation) Maghreb Fès
5	MF	Ismail Moutaraji	1 February 2000 (aged 22)	(Royal Moroccan Football Federation) Wydad AC
6	MF	Amine Souane	17 September 2001 (aged 20)	(Royal Moroccan Football Federation) MC Oujda
7	MF	Reda Slim	25 October 1999 (aged 22)	(Royal Moroccan Football Federation) AS FAR
8	MF	Larbi Naji*	12 December 1990 (aged 31)	(Royal Moroccan Football Federation) AS FAR
9	FW	Soufiane Benjdida	5 September 2001 (aged 20)	(Royal Moroccan Football Federation) Raja CA
10	MF	Montasser Lahtimi	1 April 2001 (aged 21)	(Royal Moroccan Football Federation) FUS Rabat
11	FW	Youssef Mehri	7 September 1999 (aged 22)	(Royal Moroccan Football Federation) Hassania Agadir
12	GK	Rachid Ghanimi	25 April 2001 (aged 21)	(Royal Moroccan Football Federation) Rapide Oued Zem
13	DF	Adil Tahif	24 February 2001 (aged 21)	(Royal Moroccan Football Federation) SCC Mohammédia
14	MF	Salaheddine Benyachou	30 November 1999 (aged 22)	(Royal Moroccan Football Federation) Wydad AC
15	MF	Abdellah Haimoud	21 May 2001 (aged 21)	(Royal Moroccan Football Federation) Wydad AC
16	MF	Saifeddine Bouhra	5 March 2000 (aged 22)	(Royal Moroccan Football Federation) Wydad AC
17	DF	Oussama Raoui	13 November 2002 (aged 19)	(Royal Moroccan Football Federation) FUS Rabat
18	DF	Oussama Soukhane	11 January 1999 (aged 23)	(Royal Moroccan Football Federation) Raja CA
19	FW	Abdellah Farah	1 June 2001 (aged 21)	(Royal Moroccan Football Federation) Raja CA
20	DF	Mouhamed Moufid	12 January 2000 (aged 22)	(Royal Moroccan Football Federation) AS FAR
21	MF	Hamza El Janati	1 January 1999 (aged 23)	(Royal Moroccan Football Federation) Maghreb Fès
22	GK	Reda Asmama	8 February 2002 (aged 20)	(Royal Moroccan Football Federation) Union Touarga
23	MF	Abdelfattah Hadraf	22 March 1998 (aged 24)	(Royal Moroccan Football Federation) Difaâ Hassani El Jadidi

* Over-aged player.

=== Saudi Arabia ===
Coach: Saad Al-Shehri

The squad was announced on 4 August. On 6 August, Ayman Yahya withdrew from the squad due to injury and was replaced by Mohammed Al-Rashidi.

No.	Pos.	Player	Date of birth (age)	Club
1	GK	Nawaf Al-Aqidi	10 May 2000 (aged 22)	(Saudi Arabian Football Federation) Al-Nassr
3	DF	Nawaf Al-Qumairi	10 June 2001 (aged 21)	(Saudi Arabian Football Federation) Al-Tai
6	DF	Nawaf Al-Mutairi	7 March 2001 (aged 21)	(Saudi Arabian Football Federation) Al-Nassr
7	MF	Ziyad Al-Johani	11 November 2001 (aged 20)	(Saudi Arabian Football Federation) Al-Ahli
8	MF	Saad Al-Nasser	8 January 2001 (aged 21)	(Saudi Arabian Football Federation) Al-Taawoun
10	MF	Hazzaa Al-Ghamdi	12 January 2001 (aged 21)	(Saudi Arabian Football Federation) Al-Wehda
11	MF	Ahmed Al-Ghamdi	20 September 2001 (aged 20)	(Saudi Arabian Football Federation) Al-Ettifaq
12	DF	Zakaria Hawsawi	12 January 2001 (aged 21)	(Saudi Arabian Football Federation) Al-Ittihad
13	DF	Mohammed Al-Oufi	8 August 2002 (aged 20)	(Saudi Arabian Football Federation) Al-Ittihad
14	MF	Awad Al-Nashri	15 March 2002 (aged 20)	(Saudi Arabian Football Federation) Al-Ittihad
15	MF	Mohammed Al-Qahtani	23 July 2002 (aged 20)	(Saudi Arabian Football Federation) Al-Hilal
16	MF	Mohammed Al-Rashidi	6 May 2002 (aged 20)	(Football Association of the Czech Republic) Slavia Prague B
17	FW	Haitham Asiri	25 March 2001 (aged 21)	(Saudi Arabian Football Federation) Al-Ahli
18	MF	Faisal Al-Ghamdi	13 August 2001 (aged 20)	(Saudi Arabian Football Federation) Al-Ettifaq
19	MF	Meshal Al-Sebyani	11 April 2001 (aged 21)	(Saudi Arabian Football Federation) Al-Faisaly
20	FW	Mohammed Maran	15 February 2001 (aged 21)	(Saudi Arabian Football Federation) Al-Nassr
21	GK	Abdulrahman Al-Sanbi	3 February 2001 (aged 21)	(Saudi Arabian Football Federation) Al-Ahli
22	GK	Raed Azybi	22 September 2001 (aged 20)	(Saudi Arabian Football Federation) Al-Nassr
24	FW	Turki Al-Mutairi	31 May 2001 (aged 21)	(Saudi Arabian Football Federation) Al-Batin
25	DF	Mohammed Eisa	2 April 2002 (aged 20)	(Saudi Arabian Football Federation) Al-Shabab
26	DF	Rayane Hamidou	13 April 2002 (aged 20)	(Saudi Arabian Football Federation) Al-Ahli
27	MF	Samer Al-Mohaimeed	1 April 2001 (aged 21)	(Football Association of the Czech Republic) Slavia Prague B
28	DF	Khaled Daghriri	14 August 2001 (aged 20)	(Saudi Arabian Football Federation) Al-Faisaly
