= 2011 UNAF U-23 Tournament =

Tournament details
- Host country: Morocco
- Teams: 4

Final positions
- Champions: Saudi Arabia
- Runners-up: Algeria

Tournament statistics
- Matches played: 4
- Goals scored: 10 (2.5 per match)
- Top scorer: (Algeria) Mehdi Benaldjia (3 goals)

The 2011 UNAF U-23 Tournament is an association football tournament open to the Under-23 national teams of UNAF member countries. The tournament took the newly constructed Stade de Tanger in Tangier, Morocco. Of the five UNAF member countries, Libya and Tunisia chose not to participate in the competition. Instead, Niger, Saudi Arabia and Qatar were invited to the tournament. However, just days prior to the start of the competition, Egypt and Qatar withdrew from the competition.

Saudi Arabia won the competition after winning their two games against Algeria and Morocco.

== Participants ==
- Algeria (holders)
- Morocco (hosts)
- Niger (invitee)
- Saudi Arabia (invitee)

== Venues ==
Tangier
Stade Ibn Batouta
Capacity: 45,000

== Matches ==
Key to colours in group table
Group winner and champion

Team	Pld	W	D	L	GF	GA	GD	Pts
Saudi Arabia	2	2	0	0	5	2	+3	6
Algeria	2	1	0	1	4	3	+1	3
Morocco	2	0	1	1	1	2	-1	1
Niger	2	0	1	1	0	3	-3	1

November 1, 2011
18:00 GMT

Algeria	1 – 3	Saudi Arabia
Benaldjia 82'	Report	Al-Mousa 42' (pen.); Al Dosari 66'; Al Otaibi 86'

Stade de Tanger, Tangier

November 1, 2011
20:30 GMT

Morocco	0 – 0	Niger

Stade de Tanger, Tangier

November 4, 2011
18:00 GMT

Algeria	3 – 0	Niger
Bounedjah 9'; Benaldjia 19' 43'	Report

Stade de Tanger, Tangier

November 4, 2011
20:30 GMT

Morocco	1 – 2	Saudi Arabia
Cheradi 1'		Bahebri 11'; Majarashi 85'

Stade de Tanger, Tangier

== Scorers ==
3 goals

- (Algeria) Mehdi Benaldjia

1 goal

- (Algeria) Baghdad Bounedjah
- (Morocco) Nabil Cheradi
- (Saudi Arabia) Tamim Al-Dosari
- (Saudi Arabia) Mosaab Al-Otaibi
- (Saudi Arabia) Radhwan Al-Mousa
- (Saudi Arabia) Hattan Bahebri
- (Saudi Arabia) Mohamad Majarashi
