= Ayo Saka =

Nigerian footballer

Personal information
- Date of birth: 22 December 1990 (age 35)
- Place of birth: Lagos, Nigeria
- Height: 1.78 m (5 ft 10 in)
- Position: Midfielder

Team information
- Current team: Lobi Stars

Senior career*
| Years | Team | Apps | (Gls) |
| 2008–2009 | Union Bank | | |
| 2009–2010 | Heartland | | |
| 2010–2011 | Ocean Boys | | |
| 2012–2014 | Enyimba | | |
| 2015 | Dolphins | | |
| 2016 | Sunshine Stars | | |
| 2017 | Rivers United | | |
| 2018– | Lobi Stars | | |

International career^{‡}
| 2010–2013 | Nigeria | 2 | (0) |
- * Club domestic league appearances and goals as of 07:51, 16 July 2018 (UTC) ‡ National team caps and goals as of 07:51, 16 July 2018 (UTC)

Ayo Saka (born 22 December 1990) is a Nigerian international footballer who plays for Lobi Stars as a midfielder.

== Career ==
Born in Lagos, Saka has also played club football in Nigeria for Union Bank, Heartland, Ocean Boys, Enyimba, Dolphins, Sunshine Stars, Rivers United and Lobi Stars.

He made his international debut for Nigeria in 2010.
