= 2006 UNAF U-23 Tournament =

Tournament details
- Country: Libya
- Dates: 5–9 August
- Teams: 4

Final positions
- Champions: Libya (1st title)
- Runners-up: Egypt
- Third place: Algeria

Tournament statistics
- Matches played: 6
- Goals scored: 18 (3 per match)

The 2006 UNAF U-23 Tournament was the 1st edition of the UNAF U-23 Tournament. The tournament took place in Libya, between 5 and 9 August 2006.

== Participants ==
- Algeria
- Egypt
- Libya (Hosts)
- Tunisia

== Tournament ==
Pos	Team	Pld	W	D	L	GF	GA	GD	Pts	Final result
1	Libya (H)	3	2	0	1	7	4	+3	6	Champions
2	Algeria	3	1	1	1	3	3	0	4	Runners-up
3	Egypt	3	1	1	1	4	5	−1	4	Third place
4	Tunisia	3	0	2	1	4	6	−2	2	Fourth place

Source: UNAF
Rules for classification: Group stage tiebreakers
(H) Hosts

=== Matches ===
5 November 2006
14:00

Libya	3–1	Tunisia
	Report

Tripoli, Libya
5 November 2006
14:00

Egypt	1–0	Algeria
	Report

Tripoli, Libya

7 November 2006
14:00

Tunisia	2–2	Algeria
	Report

Tripoli, Libya
7 November 2006
14:00

Libya	4–2	Egypt
	Report

Tripoli, Libya

9 November 2006
14:00

Egypt	1–1	Tunisia
	Report

Tripoli, Libya
9 November 2006
14:00

Algeria	1–0	Libya
	Report

Tripoli, Libya
