= Kulegani Madondo =

South African footballer

Khulekani Madondo
Personal information
- Full name: Khulekani Magnificent Madondo
- Date of birth: 20 June 1990 (age 36)
- Place of birth: Pietermaritzburg, South Africa
- Position: Central midfielder

Team information
- Current team: Baroka
- Number: 24

Youth career
- Real Argentina
- AmaZulu
- Bidvest Wits
- Maritzburg United

Senior career*
Years	Team	Apps	(Gls)
2008–2012	Maritzburg United	68	(1)
2012–2015	AmaZulu	68	(0)
2015–2017	Platinum Stars	13	(0)
2017–2019	Richards Bay	52	(1)
2019–	Baroka	5	(0)
- * Club domestic league appearances and goals as of 01:04, 7 November 2019 (UTC)

Khulekani Madondo (born 20 June 1990 in Pietermaritzburg, KwaZulu-Natal) is a South African football (soccer) midfielder for Premier Soccer League club Baroka.
