= Naïm Laidouni =

Algerian footballer (born 2002)

Personal information
- Date of birth: 24 September 2002 (age 24)
- Place of birth: Saint-Chamond, France
- Height: 1.87 m (6 ft 1 1/2 in)
- Position: Centre-back

Team information
- Current team: Umm Salal
- Number: 19

Youth career
- 2006–2015: ASA Chambon
- 2015–2017: Saint-Étienne
- 2017–2019: Andrézieux

Senior career*
Years	Team	Apps	(Gls)
2019–2020	Andrézieux	1	(0)
2020–2022	Clermont II	20	(1)
2022–2023	Nîmes	0	(0)
2023–	Umm Salal	49	(0)

International career^{‡}
2022	Algeria U20	2	(0)
2022–2023	Algeria U23	2	(0)
- * Club domestic league appearances and goals as of 17 January 2026 ‡ National team caps and goals as of 03:15, 1 December 2023 (UTC)

Naïm Laidouni (Arabic: نعيم لعيدوني; born 24 September 2002) is a professional footballer who plays as a centre-back for the Qatar Stars League club Umm Salal. Born in France, he is a youth international for Algeria.

== Playing career ==
Laidouni is a youth product of the French clubs ASA Chambon, Saint-Étienne and Andrézieux. He made one appearance with the senior Andrézieux side in 2019, before moving to the reserves of Clermont on 16 June 2020 where he became captain. On 2 August 2021, he signed a professional contract with Clermont for one season. He spent the 2022–23 season with the Ligue 2 club Nîmes but did not make an appearance, and left as the club was relegated. On 7 June 2023, he transferred to the Qatari club Umm Salal on a 5-year contract.

== International career ==
Laidouni was born in France to an Algerian father and Tunisian mother. He played for the Algeria U20s for the 2022 Maurice Revello Tournament.

== Personal life ==
Laidouni is the younger brother of the Tunisia international footballer Aïssa Laïdouni.
