= Football at the 1999 All-Africa Games =

1999 All-Africa Games football tournament
Tournament details
- Host country: South Africa
- City: Johannesburg
- Dates: 9–19 September 1999
- Teams: 8 (from 1 confederation)
- Venue(s): 2 (in 1 host city)

Final positions
- Champions: Cameroon (2nd title)
- Runners-up: Zambia
- Third place: South Africa
- Fourth place: Uganda

Tournament statistics
- Matches played: 18
- Goals scored: 43 (2.39 per match)

The 1999 All-Africa Games football tournament was the 7th edition of the African Games men's football tournament. The football tournament was held in Johannesburg, South Africa between 9–19 September 1999 as part of the 1999 All-Africa Games.

== Qualified teams ==
The following countries have qualified for the final tournament:

Zone	Team
Hosts	South Africa
Zone I	Algeria
Zone II	Mali
Zone III	Ivory Coast
Zone IV	Cameroon
Zone V	Uganda
Zone VI	Zimbabwe
Zone VII	Mauritius

== Final tournament ==
All times given as local time (UTC+2)

=== Group stage ===
Key to colours in group tables
Teams that advanced to the semifinals

==== Group 1 ====
Team	Pld	W	D	L	GF	GA	GD	Pts
South Africa	3	2	1	0	6	1	+5	7
Uganda	3	1	1	1	2	2	0	4
Algeria	3	1	0	2	2	4	−2	3
Mali	3	1	0	2	3	6	−3	3

9 September 1999

South Africa	2–0	Algeria
Lekoelea 68'; Nomvethe 77'

Orlando Stadium, Johannesburg
9 September 1999

Uganda	2–0	Mali
Byekwaso 48'; Kyambadde 53'

Rand Stadium, Johannesburg

11 September 1999

South Africa	4–1	Mali
Marumo 30'; Nomvethe 66', 76'; Mbuthu 90'		1' Coulibaly

Orlando Stadium, Johannesburg
11 September 1999

Algeria	2–0	Uganda
Bendebka 34'; Djillali 80'

Rand Stadium, Johannesburg

13 September 1999

Uganda	0–0	South Africa

Orlando Stadium, Johannesburg
13 September 1999

Mali	2–0	Algeria
Bagayoko 40'; Coulibaly 56'

Rand Stadium, Johannesburg

==== Group 2 ====
Team	Pld	W	D	L	GF	GA	GD	Pts
Cameroon	3	2	1	0	6	1	+5	7
Zambia	3	2	0	1	7	2	+5	6
Ivory Coast	3	1	1	1	4	7	−3	4
Mauritius	3	0	0	3	2	9	−7	0

10 September 1999

Zambia	4–0	Ivory Coast
Traoré 22' (o.g.); Mwamba 27'; Banda 55'; Fichite 74'

Orlando Stadium, Johannesburg
10 September 1999

Mauritius	0–3	Cameroon
		Hanga 7'; Mbida 19'; Meyongué 89'

Rand Stadium, Johannesburg

12 September 1999

Zambia	0–2	Cameroon
		Kibong Lam 40'; Beka 42'

Orlando Stadium, Johannesburg
Referee: ... Bouthir (Tunisia)
12 September 1999

Ivory Coast	3–2	Mauritius
Koné 3', 55'; Koffi 88'		Naboth 72'; Ithier 74'

Rand Stadium, Johannesburg

14 September 1999

Mauritius	0–3	Zambia
		Zulu 11'; Numba 28'; Banda 69'

Orlando Stadium, Johannesburg
14 September 1999

Cameroon	1–1	Ivory Coast
Meyongué 67'		Koné 83'

Rand Stadium, Johannesburg

=== Knockout stage ===
Fifth place
16 September – Johannesburg
Algeria	2
Ivory Coast	0
Seventh place
16 September – Johannesburg
Mali	5
Mauritius	0

==== Seventh place match ====
16 September 1999

Mali	5–0	Mauritius
Ndiaye 6', 30'; M. Bagayoko 26'; S. Bagayoko 45'; Anthonee 82' (o.g.)

Johannesburg

==== Fifth place match ====
16 September 1999

Algeria	2–0	Ivory Coast
Sahraoui 20'; N'Gbocho 57' (o.g.)

Johannesburg

Semifinals
17 September – Johannesburg
South Africa	0
Zambia (a.e.t.)	1
17 September – Johannesburg
Cameroon	1
Uganda	0

Final
19 September – Johannesburg
Cameroon (p)	0 (4)
Zambia	0 (3)
Third place
19 September – Johannesburg
South Africa	2
Uganda	0

==== Semifinals ====
17 September 1999

South Africa	0–1 (a.e.t.)	Zambia
		Mafuki 107'

Orlando Stadium, Johannesburg

17 September 1999

Cameroon	1–0 (a.e.t.)	Uganda
Mbida Messi 18'

Orlando Stadium, Johannesburg

==== Third place match ====
19 September 1999

South Africa	2–0 (a.e.t.)	Uganda
Pule 18'; Nhleko 20'

Orlando Stadium, Johannesburg

==== Final ====
19 September 1999

Cameroon	0–0 (a.e.t.)	Zambia
Penalties
[[]] (penalty scored) [[]] (penalty scored) [[]] (penalty scored) [[]] (penalty missed) [[]] (penalty missed); Bekono (penalty scored)	4–3	(penalty scored) Chibale; (penalty scored) Kampamba; (penalty scored) Fichite; (penalty missed) Sinyangwe; (penalty missed) Chilufya; (penalty missed) Mwamba

Johannesburg Stadium, Johannesburg

== Final ranking ==
Pos	Team	Pld	W	D	L	GF	GA	GD	Pts	Final result
1st place, gold medalist(s)	Cameroon	5	4	0	1	8	3	+5	12	Gold Medal
2nd place, silver medalist(s)	Zambia	5	3	0	2	7	7	0	9	Silver Medal
3rd place, bronze medalist(s)	South Africa (H)	5	2	1	2	5	3	+2	7	Bronze Medal
4	Uganda	5	2	2	1	5	4	+1	8	Fourth place
5	Algeria	4	1	0	3	4	7	−3	3	Eliminated in group stage
6	Ivory Coast	4	2	1	1	8	6	+2	7	Eliminated in group stage
7	Mali	4	0	1	3	4	9	−5	1	Eliminated in group stage
8	Mauritius	4	1	1	2	3	5	−2	4	Eliminated in group stage

Source: todor66
(H) Hosts
