= 2023 U-23 Africa Cup of Nations squads =

U-23 Africa Cup of Nations squads

The following is a list of squads for each national team competing at the 2023 Africa U-23 Cup of Nations. The tournament took place in Morocco from 24 June to 8 July 2023. It was the fourth U-23 age group competition organised by the Confederation of African Football (CAF).

The 8 national teams involved in the tournament were required to register a squad of maximum 26 players, including three goalkeepers. Only players in these squads were eligible to take part in the tournament. Players born on or after 1 January 2001 were eligible to compete in the tournament.

The full squad listings are below. The age listed for each player is on 24 June 2023, the first day of the tournament. The nationality for each club reflects the national association (not the league) to which the club is affiliated. A flag is included for coaches who are of a different nationality than their own national team.

Players marked in boldface have been capped at full international level.

== Group A ==
=== Congo ===
Head coach: Cyril Ndonga

=== Ghana ===
Head coach: Ibrahim Tanko

No.	Pos.	Player	Date of birth (age)	Club
1	GK	**Ibrahim Danlad**	2 December 2002 (aged 20)	(Ghana Football Association) Asante Kotoko
2	DF	Godfred Poku Wakii	16 October 2003 (aged 19)	(Ghana Football Association) Aduana Stars
3	FW	**Ernest Nuamah**	1 November 2003 (aged 19)	(Danish Football Association) Nordsjælland
4	DF	Samuel Abbey-Ashie Quaye	14 April 2001 (aged 22)	(Ghana Football Association) Accra Great Olympics
5	DF	Nathaniel Adjei	21 August 2002 (aged 20)	(Swedish Football Association) Hammarby
6	MF	Emmanuel Essiam	19 December 2003 (aged 19)	(Swiss Football Association) Basel
7	DF	Terry Yegbe	25 January 2001 (aged 22)	(Football Association of Finland) SJK
8	MF	Dominic Nsobila	19 December 2002 (aged 20)	(Ghana Football Association) Accra Lions
9	FW	Godwin Bentil	30 January 2001 (aged 22)	(French Football Federation) Niort
10	FW	**Issahaku Fatawu**	8 March 2004 (aged 19)	(Portuguese Football Federation) Sporting CP
11	FW	Emmanuel Yeboah	25 February 2003 (aged 20)	(Romanian Football Federation) Cluj
12	FW	Zubairu Ibrahim	2 June 2004 (aged 19)	(Football Association of Serbia) Jedinstvo
13	GK	Jordan Amissah	2 August 2001 (aged 21)	(The Football Association) Sheffield United
14	DF	Aaron Essel	30 July 2005 (aged 17)	(Ghana Football Association) Bechem United
15	DF	David Oppong Afrane	3 December 2002 (aged 20)	(Ghana Football Association) King Faisal Babes
16	GK	Haruna Aziz Dari	23 May 2001 (aged 22)	(Ghana Football Association) Bechem United
17	MF	Sylvester Simba	29 July 2001 (aged 21)	(Ghana Football Association) Dreams
18	FW	**Daniel Afriyie**	26 June 2001 (aged 21)	(Swiss Football Association) Zürich
19	MF	Hafiz Ibrahim	10 May 2002 (aged 21)	(Ghana Football Association) Attram de Visser
20	MF	Salim Adams	11 October 2002 (aged 20)	(United States Soccer Federation) Cincinnati
21	MF	Abass Samari Salifu	2 July 2004 (aged 18)	(Ghana Football Association) Accra Lions
22	DF	Augustine Randolf	26 March 2001 (aged 22)	(Ghana Football Association) Karela United
23	DF	Ebenezer Adade	26 May 2002 (aged 21)	(Ghana Football Association) Dreams
24	DF	Edmund Arko-Mensah	9 September 2001 (aged 21)	(Football Association of Finland) Honka
25	FW	Emmanuel Appau	4 May 2002 (aged 21)	(Ghana Football Association) Bibiani Gold Stars

=== Guinea ===
Head coach: Morlaye Cissé

No.	Pos.	Player	Date of birth (age)	Club
1	GK	Lassana Diakhaby	1 May 2004 (age 22)	(French Football Federation) Valenciennes
2	DF	Chérif Camara	21 October 2002 (aged 20)	(Guinean Football Federation) Hafia
3	MF	**Seydouba Cissé**	10 March 2001 (aged 22)	(Royal Spanish Football Federation) Leganés
4	MF	Mohamed Lamine Soumah	7 July 2002 (aged 20)	(French Football Federation) Chartres
5	DF	Bangaly Cissé	28 December 2002 (aged 20)	(Guinean Football Federation) SOAR
6	MF	Fodé Camara	23 June 2002 (aged 21)	(Guinean Football Federation) Horoya
7	FW	Alseny Soumah	1 January 2001 (aged 22)	(Guinean Football Federation) Horoya
8	MF	Ibrahima Breze Fofana	15 August 2002 (aged 20)	(Swedish Football Association) Hammarby
9	FW	Saran Mamoudou Kanté	1 January 2001 (aged 22)	(Guinean Football Federation) Fello Star
10	FW	Momo Cissé	17 October 2002 (aged 20)	(German Football Association) Stuttgart
11	FW	Ousmane Camara	3 November 2001 (aged 21)	(French Football Federation) Auxerre
12	FW	Algassime Bah	12 November 2002 (aged 20)	(Hellenic Football Federation) Olympiacos
13	DF	Naby Oularé	6 August 2002 (aged 20)	(Turkish Football Federation) Boluspor
14	MF	Ousmane Coumbassa	27 July 2001 (aged 21)	(Tunisian Football Federation) Olympique Béja
15	DF	Mohamed Soumah	13 March 2003 (aged 20)	(Guinean Football Federation) Kaloum
16	GK	Sékou Camara	25 May 2002 (aged 21)	(Guinean Football Federation) Renaissance
17	FW	Salifou Soumah	3 October 2003 (aged 19)	(French Football Federation) Le Havre
18	FW	**Sekou Tidiany Bangoura**	5 April 2002 (aged 21)	(Turkish Football Federation) Istanbul Basaksehir
19	MF	Cheick Thiam	27 September 2003 (aged 19)	(Royal Belgian Football Association) Zulte Waregem
20	DF	Naby Camara	3 December 2001 (aged 21)	(Tunisian Football Federation) Sfaxien
21	DF	Madiou Keita	29 August 2004 (aged 18)	(French Football Federation) Auxerre
22	GK	Mory Keita	13 July 2005 (aged 17)	(Guinean Football Federation) Fello Star
23	MF	**Aguibou Camara**	20 May 2001 (aged 22)	(Hellenic Football Federation) Olympiacos

=== Morocco ===
Head coach: (Morocco) Issame Charaï

No.	Pos.	Player	Date of birth (age)	Club
1	GK	Alaa Bellaarouch	1 February 2002 (aged 21)	(French Football Federation) Strasbourg
2	DF	Omar El Hilali	12 September 2003 (aged 19)	(Royal Spanish Football Federation) Espanyol
3	DF	**Chadi Riad**	17 June 2003 (aged 20)	(Royal Spanish Football Federation) Barcelona
4	DF	Redouane Halhal	5 March 2003 (aged 20)	(French Football Federation) Montpellier
5	DF	Ayman El Wafi	11 May 2004 (aged 19)	(Swiss Football Association) Lugano
6	MF	Benjamin Bouchouari	13 November 2001 (aged 21)	(French Football Federation) Saint-Étienne
7	FW	Couhaib Driouech	17 April 2002 (aged 21)	(Royal Dutch Football Association) Excelsior
8	MF	**Ismael Saibari**	28 January 2001 (aged 22)	(Royal Dutch Football Association) PSV
9	FW	Amine El Ouazzani	15 July 2001 (aged 21)	(French Football Federation) Guingamp
10	FW	Ibrahim Salah	30 August 2001 (aged 21)	(French Football Federation) Rennes
11	DF	Zakaria El Ouahdi	31 December 2001 (aged 21)	(Royal Belgian Football Association) Molenbeek
12	GK	Elias Mago	23 March 2004 (aged 19)	(Royal Belgian Football Association) Standard Liège
13	FW	Yanis Begraoui	4 July 2001 (aged 21)	(French Football Federation) Pau
14	MF	Oussama Targhalline	20 May 2002 (aged 21)	(French Football Federation) Le Havre
15	DF	Mehdi Boukamir	26 January 2004 (aged 19)	(Royal Belgian Football Association) Charleroi
16	FW	**Abde Ezzalzouli** (captain)	25 December 2001 (aged 21)	(Royal Spanish Football Federation) Osasuna
17	MF	**Oussama El Azzouzi**	29 May 2001 (aged 22)	(Royal Belgian Football Association) Union Saint-Gilloise
18	DF	Ayoub Amraoui	14 May 2004 (aged 19)	(French Football Federation) Nice
19	DF	Zakaria Labib	28 February 2003 (aged 20)	(Royal Moroccan Football Federation) Raja Casablanca
20	FW	Hamza Igamane	2 November 2002 (aged 20)	(Royal Moroccan Football Federation) AS FAR
21	FW	Abde Raihani	3 February 2004 (aged 19)	(Royal Spanish Football Federation) Atlético Madrid
22	GK	Rachid Ghanimi	25 April 2001 (aged 22)	(Royal Moroccan Football Federation) Rapide Oued Zem
23	MF	**Bilal El Khannouss**	10 May 2004 (aged 19)	(Royal Belgian Football Association) Genk
24	MF	**Amir Richardson**	24 January 2002 (aged 21)	(French Football Federation) Le Havre
25	FW	Younes Taha	27 November 2002 (aged 20)	(Royal Dutch Football Association) Twente
26	DF	Akram Nakach	7 April 2002 (aged 21)	(Royal Moroccan Football Federation) Union Touarga

== Group B ==
=== Egypt ===
Head coach: (Brazil) Rogério Micale

No.	Pos.	Player	Date of birth (age)	Club
1	GK	Hamza Alaa	1 March 2001 (aged 22)	(Egyptian Football Association) Al Ahly
2	DF	Omar Fayed	4 July 2003 (aged 19)	(Football Association of Serbia) Novi Pazar
3	DF	Mohamed El Maghrabi	28 April 2001 (aged 22)	(Egyptian Football Association) Smouha
4	DF	Ahmed Eid	1 January 2001 (aged 22)	(Egyptian Football Association) ENPPI
5	DF	Hossam Abdelmaguid	30 April 2001 (aged 22)	(Egyptian Football Association) Zamalek
6	MF	Mahmoud Gehad	20 August 2001 (aged 21)	(Egyptian Football Association) Pharco
7	MF	Mahmoud Saber	30 July 2001 (aged 21)	(Egyptian Football Association) Pyramids
8	MF	Ahmed Fawzi	23 May 2002 (aged 21)	(Egyptian Football Association) Al Mokawloon Al Arab
9	FW	**Osama Faisal**	1 January 2001 (aged 22)	(Egyptian Football Association) National Bank of Egypt
10	FW	Ibrahim Adel	23 April 2001 (aged 22)	(Egyptian Football Association) Pyramids
11	FW	Emad Mayhoub	1 January 2001 (aged 22)	(Egyptian Football Association) ENPPI
12	MF	**Ahmed Koka**	4 July 2001 (aged 21)	(Egyptian Football Association) Al Ahly
13	GK	Mohamed Seha	1 May 2001 (aged 22)	(Egyptian Football Association) Al Mokawloon Al Arab
14	FW	Ahmed Atef	19 December 2002 (aged 20)	(Egyptian Football Association) Al Mokawloon Al Arab
15	DF	Mohamed Tarek	20 April 2002 (aged 21)	(Egyptian Football Association) Zamalek
16	GK	Ali El Gabry	14 February 2001 (aged 22)	(Egyptian Football Association) Ceramica Cleopatra
17	MF	Mohamed Shehata	1 January 2001 (aged 22)	(Egyptian Football Association) Tala'ea El Gaish
18	FW	Mostafa Saad	22 August 2001 (aged 21)	(Egyptian Football Association) Smouha
19	MF	Ali Zazaa	23 June 2001 (aged 22)	(Egyptian Football Association) Future
20	DF	Mohamed Samir	1 January 2001 (aged 22)	(Egyptian Football Association) Tala'ea El Gaish
21	DF	Mohamed Ashraf	1 October 2001 (aged 21)	(Egyptian Football Association) Al Ahly
22	DF	Hatem Mohamed	26 October 2001 (aged 21)	(Egyptian Football Association) Zamalek
23	FW	Abdelrahman Atef	4 June 2001 (aged 22)	(Egyptian Football Association) Ghazl El Mahalla
26	DF	Mohamed Hamdy	26 February 2003 (aged 20)	(Egyptian Football Association) ENPPI

=== Gabon ===
Head coach: Saturnin Ibela

=== Mali ===
Head coach: Alou Badra Diallo

No.	Pos.	Player	Date of birth (age)	Club
1	GK	Lassine Diarra	11 November 2002 (aged 20)	(French Football Federation) Châteauroux
2	DF	Fodé Doucouré	3 February 2001 (aged 22)	(French Football Federation) Red Star
3	DF	Hamidou Diallo	26 January 2002 (aged 21)	(Portuguese Football Federation) Farense
4	DF	Lassine Soumaoro	19 December 2002 (aged 20)	(French Football Federation) Troyes
5	DF	Ibrahima Cissé	15 February 2001 (aged 22)	(German Football Association) Schalke 04
6	MF	**Mamady Diambou**	11 November 2002 (aged 20)	(Austrian Football Association) Salzburg
8	MF	**Boubacar Traoré**	20 August 2001 (aged 21)	(The Football Association) Wolverhampton
9	FW	Cheickna Doumbia	14 June 2003 (aged 20)	(United Arab Emirates Football Association) Shabab Al-Ahli
10	MF	Mamadou Sangare	26 June 2002 (aged 20)	(Austrian Football Association) Hartberg
11	FW	Issoufi Maïga	12 February 2002 (aged 21)	(Portuguese Football Federation) Trofense
12	MF	Abdoulaye Bathily	7 August 2002 (aged 20)	(French Football Federation) Sète
13	MF	Brahima Diarra	5 July 2003 (aged 19)	(The Football Association) Huddersfield
14	FW	Ladji Mallé	12 November 2001 (aged 21)	(United States Soccer Federation) Los Angeles FC
16	GK	Alkalifa Coulibaly	3 December 2001 (aged 21)	(Malian Football Federation) Onze Créateurs
17	DF	Hamed Diomandé	15 December 2002 (aged 20)	(Malian Football Federation) Afrique Football Élite
18	FW	Cheickna Diakité	25 December 2004 (aged 18)	(Malian Football Federation) Real Bamako
19	MF	Mohamadou Lamine Bah	23 October 2001 (aged 21)	(Tunisian Football Federation) Olympique Béja
20	FW	Alhassane Tamboura	29 June 2001 (aged 21)	(United Arab Emirates Football Association) Al-Dhaid
21	MF	Coli Saco	15 May 2002 (aged 21)	(Italian Football Federation) Pro Vercelli
22	GK	Madou Diakité	22 July 2004 (aged 18)	(Italian Football Federation) Terracina
24	FW	Mohamed Guindo	1 August 2003 (aged 19)	(Italian Football Federation) Pro Vercelli
25	DF	Koly Soumare	22 February 2001 (aged 22)	(French Football Federation) Valenciennes
26	DF	Zoumana Coulibaly	4 September 2001 (aged 21)	(Malian Football Federation) Afrique Football Élite

=== Niger ===
Head coach: Zakariaou Ibrahim Yahaya
