= Papa Demba Camara =

Senegalese goalkeeper

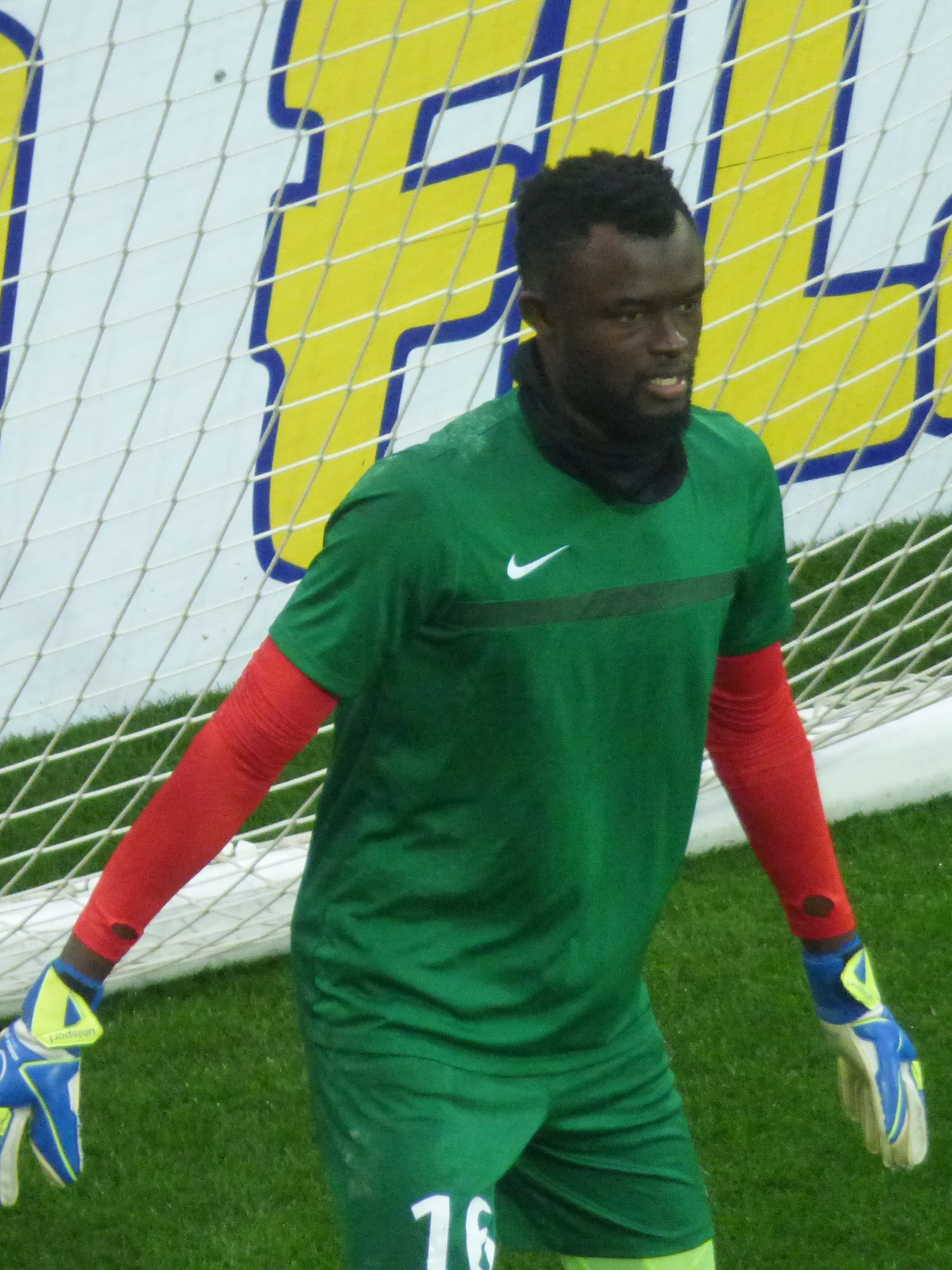
- Demba Camara in 2018

Personal information
- Full name: Pape Demba Oumar Camara
- Date of birth: 16 January 1993 (age 33)
- Place of birth: Pout, Senegal
- Height: 1.96 m (6 ft 5 in)
- Position: Goalkeeper

Team information
- Current team: Jura Dolois

Youth career
- 2008: Étoile Lusitana
- 2009: Dakar UC
- 2010–2011: Braga
- 2011–2016: Sochaux-Montbéliard

Senior career*
Years	Team	Apps	(Gls)
2011–2016	Sochaux B	56	(0)
2012–2016	Sochaux	8	(0)
2016–2020	Grenoble	20	(0)
2021–2022	Plabennec	18	(0)
2022–2023	Créteil	21	(0)
2023–2024	Jura Dolois	19	(0)
2024–2025	Valenciennes	2	(0)
2024–2025	Valenciennes II	2	(0)
2025–	Jura Dolois	6	(0)

International career
2014	Senegal	1	(0)
- * Club domestic league appearances and goals as of 13 December 2025

Papa Demba Camara (born 16 January 1993) is a Senegalese professional footballer who plays as a goalkeeper for French Championnat National 3 club Jura Dolois.

== Club career ==
On 12 June 2024, Camara signed a contract with Valenciennes in Championnat National for one season, with an optional second year.

== International career ==
He was part of the Senegal national under-23 football team at the 2012 Summer Olympics in London.

== Career statistics ==
=== Club ===
As of 18 July 2020

Appearances and goals by club, season and competition
Club	Season	League			Cup (Note: Includes Coupe de France, Coupe de la Ligue, Trophée des champions)		Europe (Note: Includes UEFA Super Cup)		Total	
Club	Season	Division	Apps	Goals	Apps	Goals	Apps	Goals	Apps	Goals
Sochaux	2011–12	Ligue 1	3	0	0	0	—		3	0
Sochaux	2012–13	Ligue 1	1	0	1	0	—		2	0
Sochaux	2013–14	Ligue 1	1	0	0	0	—		1	0
Sochaux	2014–15	Ligue 2	4	0	2	0	—		6	0
Sochaux	2015–16	Ligue 2	7	0	2	0	—		9	0
Sochaux	Total		16	0	5	0	0	0	21	0
Grenoble	2016–17	National 2	0	0	0	0	—		0	0
Grenoble	2017–18	National	4	0	3	0	—		7	0
Grenoble	2018–19	Ligue 2	15	0	4	0	—		19	0
Grenoble	2019–20	Ligue 2	1	0	2	0	—		3	0
Grenoble	Total		20	0	9	0	0	0	0	29
Career total			36	0	14	0	0	0	50	0
