= Emmanuel Anyanwu =

Nigerian footballer

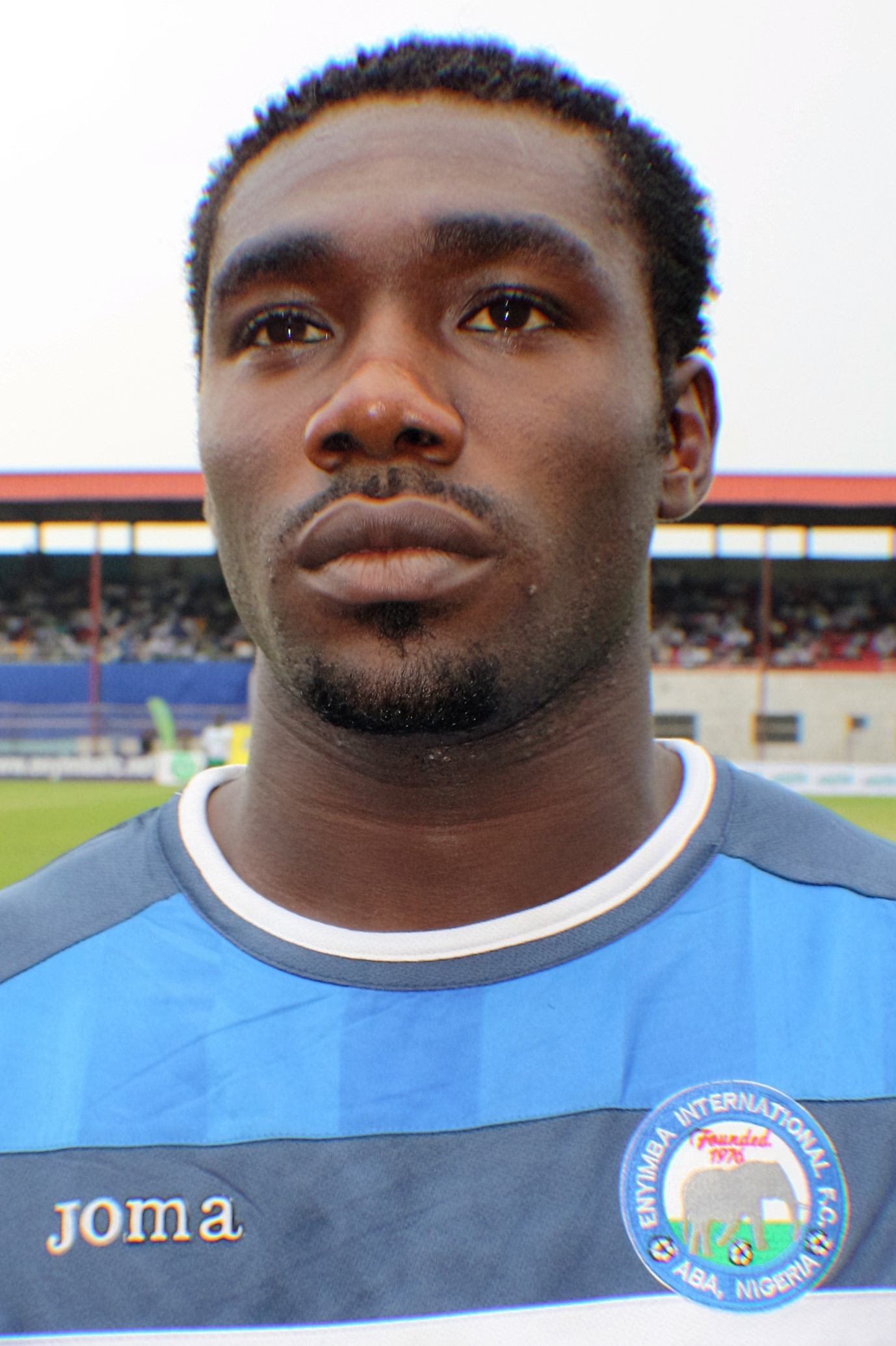
- 2010 by Nobert Okoli, Enugu

Personal information
- Date of birth: 15 November 1991 (age 34)
- Place of birth: Nigeria
- Position: Central defender

Team information
- Current team: Kano Pillars

Senior career*
Years	Team	Apps	(Gls)
2009–2016	Enyimba		
2017–	Kano Pillars		

International career
2010–	Nigeria U-20	4	
2011–	Nigeria U-23		
2010–	Nigeria	1	(0)
- * Club domestic league appearances and goals as of 15:55, 11 September 2010 (UTC)

Emmanuel Iyke Anyanwu (born 15 November 1991) is a Nigerian footballer who plays as a defender for Kano Pillars. He is the younger brother of former Enyimba teammates Nnaemeka Anyanwu and Kenneth Anyanwu.

== International career ==
He was called up in July 2010 for the Nigeria friendly against South Korea and made his debut in that game. He has also played for the Flying Eagles and the Under-23 Olympic team.
