= Dudley Fichite =

Zambian footballer (born 1978)

Personal information
- Date of birth: 29 June 1978 (age 48)
- Position: Midfielder

Senior career*
Years	Team	Apps	(Gls)
1999	Power Dynamos		
2000	Lusaka Dynamos		
2001–2004	Green Buffaloes		
2005	Primeiro de Agosto		

International career^{‡}
1999–2004	Zambia	19	(3)
- * Club domestic league appearances and goals as of 1 August 2020 ‡ National team caps and goals as of 1 August 2020

Dudley Fichite (born 29 June 1978) is a retired Zambian football midfielder.
