= 2010 UNAF U-23 Tournament =

Tournament details
- Host country: Morocco
- Teams: 4

Final positions
- Champions: Algeria
- Runners-up: Morocco

Tournament statistics
- Matches played: 6
- Goals scored: 20 (3.33 per match)
- Top scorer(s): (Algeria) Oussama Mesfar (3 goals)

The 2010 UNAF U-23 Tournament is an association football tournament open to the Under-23 national teams of UNAF member countries. The tournament took place between 13 December and 18 December 2010 in Morocco with matches held in the cities of El Jadida, Casablanca and Mohammédia. Cameroon was invited to the tournament to replace Tunisia.

Algeria won the tournament after beating all three teams and finishing the group stage with 9 points. Morocco finished in second place with 6 points, 2 wins and a loss.

== Participants ==
- Algeria
- Libya
- Morocco
- Cameroon (invited)

== Venues ==
Cities	Venues	Capacity
Casablanca	Stade Mohamed V	55,000
El Jadida	Stade El Abdi	15,000
Mohammédia	Stade El Bachir	15,000

== Matches ==
Key to colours in group table
Group winner and champion

Team	Pld	W	D	L	GF	GA	GD	Pts
Algeria	3	3	0	0	12	1	+11	9
Morocco	3	2	0	1	6	3	+3	6
Cameroon	3	0	1	2	2	6	-4	1
Libya	3	0	1	2	0	8	-8	1

December 13, 2010
18:00 GMT

Algeria	6 – 1	Cameroon
Belkalem 34' (pen.); Mehzak 47', 55'; Benaldjia 78'; Ziti 82'; Touahri 84'	Report	Belaïli 54' (o.g.)

Stade El Abdi, El Jadida

December 13, 2010
20:00 GMT

Morocco	4 – 0	Libya
Lakhal 7' (pen.); Bamaâmar 17'; Hamdallah 49'; Hadraf 51'	Report

Stade El Abdi, El Jadida

December 15, 2010
18:00 GMT

Libya	0 – 0	Cameroon

Stade Mohamed V, Casablanca

December 15, 2010
20:00 GMT

Morocco	0 – 2	Algeria
	Report	Ali Guechi 1'; Sayah 90+4'

Stade Mohamed V, Casablanca

December 18, 2010
12:30 GMT

Morocco	2 – 1	Cameroon
Nanguelle 36' (o.g.); Hamdallah 86'		Bissai 90+6' (pen.)

Stade El Bachir, Mohammédia

December 18, 2010
14:30 GMT

Algeria	4 – 0	Libya
Bedbouda 12'; Boulaïnceur 52'; Mesfar 80'; Ziti 85'	Report

Stade El Bachir, Mohammédia

== Champions ==
2010 UNAF U-23 Tournament Winners

Algeria
2nd Title

== Scorers ==
3 goals

- (Algeria) Oussama Mesfar

2 goals

- (Algeria) Mohamed Khoutir Ziti
- (Morocco) Abderrazak Hamdallah

1 goal

- (Algeria) Abdelaziz Ali Guechi
- (Algeria) Brahim Bedbouda
- (Algeria) Essaïd Belkalem
- (Algeria) Mehdi Benaldjia
- (Algeria) Rafik Boulaïnceur
- (Algeria) Saïd Sayah
- (Algeria) Amine Touahri
- (Cameroon) Beb Ga Bissai
- (Morocco) Mohamed Ali Bamaâmar
- (Morocco) Zakaria Hadraf
- (Morocco) Yassine Lakhal

Own goals
1 goal

- (Algeria) Youcef Belaïli (playing against Cameroon)
- (Cameroon) Sim Nanguelle (playing against Morocco)
