= Algeria national under-23 football team =

Algeria U-23
- Nickname(s): الأفنــاك (Fennec foxes)
- Association: Algerian Football Federation
- Confederation: CAF (Africa)
- Sub-confederation: UNAF
- Head coach: Rafik Saïfi
- Captain: Ryad Kenniche
- Home stadium: Stade du 5 Juillet
- FIFA code: ALG
First colours	Second colours

First international
- Morocco U-23 3–1 Algeria U-23 (Morocco; 1 November 1965)

Olympic Games
- Appearances: 2 (first in 1980)
- Best result: Quarter-finals (1980)

African Games
- Appearances: 7 (first in 1965)
- Best result: Gold Medal (1978)

U-23 Africa Cup of Nations
- Appearances: 2 (first in 2011)
- Best result: Silver Medal (2015)

The Algeria national under-23 football team represents Algeria in international football competitions including the Olympic Games. The selection is limited to players under the age of 23, except during the Olympic Games where the use of three overage players is allowed. The team is controlled by the Algerian Football Federation.

== History ==
Algeria first appeared in the final of the Summer Olympics held in Moscow in 1980. They managed to reach the quarter finals of the tournament.

In 2015, the under-23 team finished runners-up in the Africa Cup of Nations tournament. They lost to Nigeria 2–1 in Dakar, Senegal where the tournament was hosted. Algeria missed an opportunity to level in the second half. Zinedine Ferhat had a penalty saved by Nigeria goalkeeper Daniel Emmanuel in the 68th minute. Algeria clinched their place in the 2016 Summer Olympics men's football tournament in Rio de Janeiro by beating South Africa 2–0 in the semi-final of the Africa Cup of Nations.

== Kit history ==
=== 1st Kit ===
1980 OG	2016 OG

=== 2nd Kit ===
1980 OG	2016 OG

== Honours ==
Summer Olympic Games:

- Quarter-final: 1980

U-23 Africa Cup of Nations

- Runners-up: 2015

African Games:

- Gold Medalists: 1978

UNAF U-23 Tournament:

- Champions: 2007, 2010
- Runners-up: 2006, 2011

Islamic Solidarity Games:

- Bronze Medalists: 2017

== Competitive record ==
=== Olympic Games record ===
Olympic Games
Appearances: 2
Year	Round	Position	Pld	W	D	L	GF	GA
1900-1960	Part of France							
(Japan) 1964	did not enter							
(Mexico) 1968	did not qualify							
(Germany) 1972	did not qualify							
(Canada) 1976	did not qualify							
(Soviet Union) 1980	Quarter-finals	8th	4	1	1	2	4	5
(United States) 1984	did not qualify							
(South Korea) 1988	did not qualify							
(Spain) 1992	did not qualify							
(United States) 1996	did not qualify							
(Australia) 2000	did not qualify							
(Greece) 2004	did not qualify							
(China) 2008	did not qualify							
(United Kingdom) 2012	did not qualify							
(Brazil) 2016	Group Stage	14th	3	0	1	2	4	6
(Japan) 2020	did not qualify							
(France) 2024	did not qualify							
(United States) 2028	to be determined							
Total	Quarter-finals	2/28	7	1	2	4	8	11

- Prior to the Barcelona 1992 campaign, the Football at the Summer Olympics was open to full senior national teams.

=== African Games record ===
African Games
Appearances: 7
Year	Round	Position	Pld	W	D	L	GF	GA
(Republic of the Congo) 1965	Fourth Place	4th	5	2	0	3	6	5
(Nigeria) 1973	Group Stage	5th	3	1	1	1	6	6
(Algeria) 1978	Gold Medal	1st	5	4	1	0	9	2
(Kenya) 1987	Disqualified ^{1}							
(Egypt) 1991	did not qualify							
(Zimbabwe) 1995	Group Stage	6th	3	1	0	2	2	4
(South Africa) 1999	Group Stage	6th	3	1	0	2	2	4
(Nigeria) 2003	Group Stage	5th	3	1	1	1	3	4
(Algeria) 2007	Group Stage	5th	3	1	1	1	4	4
(Mozambique) 2011	did not qualify							
(Republic of the Congo) 2015	did not enter							
(Morocco) 2019	did not enter							
(Ghana) 2023	did not qualify							
(Egypt) 2027	To be determined							
Total	Gold Medal	7/12	25	11	4	10	32	29

- Prior to the Cairo 1991 campaign, the Football at the African Games was open to full senior national teams.
- ^1Algeria disqualified in the qualification match after beating Tunisia, for professional players on the Algeria team

=== Africa U-23 Cup of Nations record ===
U-23 Africa Cup of Nations
Appearances: 2
Year	Round	Position	Pld	W	D	L	GF	GA
(Morocco) 2011	Group stage	7th	3	1	0	2	2	5
(Senegal) 2015	Runners-up	2nd	5	2	2	1	6	3
(Egypt) 2019	did not qualify							
(Morocco) 2023	did not qualify							
(Egypt) 2027	to be determined							
Total	Runners-up	2/3	8	3	2	3	8	8

=== UNAF U-23 Tournament record ===
UNAF U-23 Tournament
Appearances: 4
Year	Round	Position	Pld	W	D	L	GF	GA
(Libya) 2006	Runners-up	2nd	3	1	1	1	4	3
(Tunisia) 2007	Winners	1st	2	0	2	0	0	0
(Morocco) 2010	Winners	1st	3	3	0	0	12	1
(Morocco) 2011	Runners-up	2nd	2	1	0	1	4	3
(Algeria) 2015	Cancelled							
Total	Winners	4/4	10	5	3	2	20	7

=== Arab Games ===
Arab Games record
Appearances: 2
Year	Result	Position	GP	W	D	L	GF	GA
(Egypt) 1953	Part of France							
(Lebanon) 1957	Part of France							
(Morocco) 1961	Part of France							
(United Arab Republic) 1965	Did not enter							
(Syria) 1976	Did not enter							
(Morocco) 1985	Bronze^{1}	3rd	5	2	0	3	4	5
(Syria) 1992	Did not enter							
(Lebanon) 1997	Did not enter							
(Jordan) 1999	Withdrew							
(Algeria) 2004	No tournament							
(Egypt) 2007	Did not enter							
(Qatar) 2011	Did not enter							
(Algeria) 2023	Fourth place	4th	5	2	2	1	7	5
(Saudi Arabia) 2027	To be determined							
Total	Bronze Medal	2/12	10	4	2	4	11	10

- Prior to the Algeria 2023 campaign, the Football at the Arab Games was open to full senior national teams.
- 1. Algeria participated with the B team.

=== Islamic Solidarity Games ===
Islamic Solidarity Games record
Appearances: 3
Year	Result	Position	GP	W	D	L	GF	GA
(Saudi Arabia) 2005	Quarter-finals	8th	4	2	0	2	4	7
(Indonesia) 2013	did not enter							
(Azerbaijan) 2017	Bronze medal	3rd	5	3	1	1	6	4
(Turkey) 2021	Fourth place	4th	5	1	3	1	6	4
(Saudi Arabia) 2025	no football tournament							
(Malaysia) 2027	to be determined							
Total	Bronze medal	3/4	14	6	4	4	16	15

== Team ==
=== Current squad ===
The following list of players were selected for the 2022 Maurice Revello Tournament between 29 May – 12 June 2022.

Caps and goals correct as of 28 May 2022.

No.	Pos.	Player	Date of birth (age)	Caps	Goals	Club
	GK	Teddy Boulhendi	9 April 2001 (age 25)	0	0	(French Football Federation) Nice
	GK	Redouane Maachou	4 February 2001 (age 25)	0	0	(Algerian Football Federation) USM Bel Abbès
	DF	Mohamed Azzi	11 May 2002 (age 24)	0	0	(Algerian Football Federation) CR Belouizdad
	DF	Reda Benchaa	12 March 2002 (age 24)	0	0	(French Football Federation) Dijon
	DF	Abdellah Bendouma	7 October 2001 (age 25)	0	0	(Algerian Football Federation) USM Bel Abbès
	DF	Joakim Kada	29 January 2001 (age 25)	0	0	(French Football Federation) Marseille
	DF	Naïm Laidouni	24 September 2002 (age 24)	0	0	(French Football Federation) Clermont Foot
	MF	Yuliwes Bellache	15 December 2002 (age 23)	0	0	(Algerian Football Federation) JS Kabylie
	MF	Nassim Benaissa	3 April 2002 (age 24)	0	0	(French Football Federation) Nice
	MF	Akram Bouras	23 February 2002 (age 24)	0	0	(Algerian Football Federation) CR Belouizdad
	MF	Cyril Khetir	28 February 2001 (age 25)	0	0	(French Football Federation) Lyon La Duchère
	MF	Fares Nechat Djabri	25 May 2001 (age 25)	0	0	(Algerian Football Federation) JS Kabylie
	MF	Camiel Neghli	6 November 2001 (age 25)	0	0	(Royal Dutch Football Association) De Graafschap
	MF	Yacine Titraoui	26 July 2003 (age 23)	0	0	(Algerian Football Federation) Paradou AC
	FW	Monsef Bakrar	13 January 2001 (age 25)	0	0	(Algerian Football Federation) ES Sétif
	FW	Chemseddine Bekkouche	13 March 2001 (age 25)	0	0	(Algerian Football Federation) CR Belouizdad
	FW	Mohamed Islam Belkhir	16 March 2001 (age 25)	0	0	(Algerian Football Federation) CR Belouizdad
	FW	Adil Boulbina	2 May 2003 (age 23)	0	0	(Algerian Football Federation) Paradou AC
	FW	Yanis Guermouche	15 April 2001 (age 25)	0	0	(French Football Federation) Montpellier
	FW	Anis Hadj Moussa	11 February 2002 (age 24)	0	0	(French Football Federation) RC Lens
	FW	Massinissa Nait Salem	30 April 2001 (age 25)	0	0	(Algerian Football Federation) JS Kabylie

=== Notable players ===
- Lakhdar Belloumi
- Salah Assad
- Rabah Madjer
- Ali Fergani

=== Former squads ===
- 1980 Summer Olympics squads - Algeria
- 2011 CAF U-23 Championship squads - Algeria
- 2015 U-23 Africa Cup of Nations squads - Algeria

== See also ==
- Algeria national football team
- Algeria national under-20 football team
- Algeria national under-17 football team
