= Mehdi Benaldjia =

Algerian footballer (born 1991)

Personal information
- Full name: Mehdi Benaldjia
- Date of birth: May 14, 1991 (age 35)
- Place of birth: Algiers, Algeria
- Position: Midfielder

Youth career
- MC Alger
- USM Alger

Senior career*
Years	Team	Apps	(Gls)
2009–2014	USM Alger	52	(4)
2012–2013	→ CR Belouizdad (loan)	21	(5)
2013–2014	→ CR Belouizdad (loan)	12	(1)
2015	DRB Tadjenanet	10	(1)
2015–2016	NA Hussein Dey	19	(1)
2016	JS Saoura	9	(0)
2016–2018	JS Kabylie	52	(11)
2018–2022	MC Alger	44	(2)
2022	Olympique de Médéa		
2022–2023	Al-Suqoor		

International career^{‡}
2009–2010	Algeria U20	4	(0)
2010–2011	Algeria U23	10	(4)
- * Club domestic league appearances and goals as of 8 February 2023 ‡ National team caps and goals as of 26 November 2011

Mehdi Benaldjia (born May 14, 1991) is an Algerian football player.

== Personal ==
Benaldjia is the younger brother of footballer Mohamed Billel Benaldjia.

== International career ==
On November 16, 2011, he was selected as part of Algeria's squad for the 2011 CAF U-23 Championship in Morocco.
