= 2011 African U-23 Championship =

بطولة إفريقيا تحت 23 سنة لكرة القدم 2011

Tournament details
- Host country: Morocco
- Dates: 26 November – 10 December
- Teams: 8 (from 1 confederation)
- Venue: 2 (in 2 host cities)

Final positions
- Champions: Gabon (1st title)
- Runners-up: Morocco
- Third place: Egypt
- Fourth place: Senegal

Tournament statistics
- Matches played: 16
- Goals scored: 35 (2.19 per match)
- Top scorer(s): (Morocco) Abdelaziz Barrada (Nigeria) Raheem Lawal (3 goals)

The 2011 African U-23 Championship was the first edition of the football tournament for players under 23 years. It was originally scheduled to be hosted by Egypt from 26 November to 10 December 2011. However, less than two months prior to the start of the tournament, Egyptian authorities decided against hosting the competition because of security concerns. On 13 October 2011, Morocco was chosen as the replacement to host the tournament.

The tournament also doubles up as the qualifiers for the 2012 Summer Olympics. The top 3 placed teams qualified automatically for the 2012 Summer Olympics football tournament, while the 4th best placed team qualify for a play-off with an AFC counterpart.

== Qualified teams ==
The Confederation of African Football chose to create a tournament and qualifying phase to decide which associations could represent Africa at the 2012 Olympic Games. Of CAF's 53 association nations, 39 agreed to participate in the qualifiers for the tournament.

To qualify for the tournament, participating nations had to overcome three two-legged qualifying stages.

Qualified teams:

- Algeria
- Ivory Coast
- Egypt
- Gabon
- Morocco
- Nigeria
- Senegal
- South Africa

== Venues ==
Marrakesh	Locations of the 2011 CAF U-23 Championship venues	Tangier
Stade de Marrakech	Locations of the 2011 CAF U-23 Championship venues	Ibn Batouta Stadium
Capacity: 45,000	Locations of the 2011 CAF U-23 Championship venues	Capacity: 45,000

== Draw ==
The draw for the tournament was held on 24 September 2011 during the CAF Executive Committee meeting in Cairo, Egypt.

== Match officials ==
The following referees were chosen for the 2012 Africa Cup of Nations.

Referees	Linesmen
(Cameroon) Néant Alioum (The Gambia) Bakary Gassama (Kenya) Sylvester Kirwa (Madagascar) Hamada Nampiandraza (Mauritania) Ali Lemghaifry (Morocco) Bouchaïb El Ahrach (Tunisia) Slim Jedidi (Zambia) Janny Sikazwe; Reserve (Ghana) Joseph Lamptey (Guinea) Aboubacar Mario Bangoura	(Burundi) Jean-Claude Birumushahu (Cameroon) Moussa Yanoussa (Republic of the Congo) Richard Bouende-Malonga (Eritrea) Angesom Ogbamariam (Kenya) Aden Marwa Range (Malawi) Moffat Champiti (Morocco) Redouane Achik (Rwanda) Felicien Kabanda (Seychelles) Jason Damoo (Tunisia) Anouar Hmila; Reserve (Djibouti) Yacin Hassan Egueh

== Group stage ==
All times given as local time (UTC)

If two or more teams tied in their points, the following tie-breaker is used:

1. Points in the matches between the concerned teams,
2. Goal difference in the matches between the concerned teams,
3. Number of goals in the matches between the concerned teams,
4. Goal difference in all group matches,
5. Number of goals in all group matches,
6. Fair Play point (number of yellow and red cards),
7. Drawing of lots.

=== Group A ===
Pos	Team	Pld	W	D	L	GF	GA	GD	Pts	Qualification
1	Senegal	3	2	0	1	3	2	+1	6	Advance to knockout stage
2	Morocco	3	2	0	1	2	1	+1	6	Advance to knockout stage
3	Nigeria	3	1	0	2	5	4	+1	3	
4	Algeria	3	1	0	2	2	5	−3	3	

Updated to match(es) played on unknown. Source:
26 November 2011
17:30

Nigeria	0–1	Morocco
	Report	Barrada 28' (pen.)

Ibn Batouta Stadium, Tangier
Referee: Sylvester Kirwa (Kenya)
26 November 2011
20:30

Algeria	1–0	Senegal
Benaldjia 77'	Report

Ibn Batouta Stadium, Tangier
Referee: Néant Alioum (Cameroon)

29 November 2011
17:30

Morocco	1–0	Algeria
Tighadouini 59'	Report

Ibn Batouta Stadium, Tangier
Referee: Janny Sikazwe (Zambia)
29 November 2011
21:30

Senegal	2–1	Nigeria
Mbodj 34'; Sané 42'	Report	Uchechi 49'

Ibn Batouta Stadium, Tangier
Referee: Slim Jedidi (Tunisia)

2 December 2011
19:00

Nigeria	4–1	Algeria
Lawal 47', 75', 85'; Uchechi 87'		Bounedjah 42'

Stade de Marrakech, Marrakesh
Referee: Bakary Papa Gassama (Gambia)
2 December 2011
19:00

Morocco	0–1	Senegal
	Report	Wade 31'

Ibn Batouta Stadium, Tangier
Referee: Hamada Nampiandraza (Madagascar)

=== Group B ===
Pos	Team	Pld	W	D	L	GF	GA	GD	Pts	Qualification
1	Egypt	3	2	0	1	3	1	+2	6	Advance to knockout stage
2	Gabon	3	1	1	1	4	3	+1	4	Advance to knockout stage
3	Ivory Coast	3	1	1	1	3	4	−1	4	
4	South Africa	3	0	2	1	2	4	−2	2	

Updated to match(es) played on unknown. Source:
27 November 2011
17:30

Egypt	1–0	Gabon
Magdi 50'	Report

Stade de Marrakech, Marrakesh
Referee: Bakary Papa Gassama (Gambia)
27 November 2011
20:30

South Africa	1–1	Ivory Coast
Bhengu 21'	Report	Griffiths 81'

Stade de Marrakech, Marrakesh
Referee: Bouchaïb El Ahrach (Morocco)

30 November 2011
17:30

Gabon	1–1	South Africa
Lengoualama 80'	Report	Masango 40'

Stade de Marrakech, Marrakesh
Referee: Ali Ould Lemghaifry (Mauritania)
30 November 2011
20:30

Ivory Coast	1–0	Egypt
Koné 82'	Report

Stade de Marrakech, Marrakesh
Referee: Hamada Nampiandraza (Madagascar)

3 December 2011
19:00

Egypt	2–0	South Africa
El Nenny 46'; Mohsen 63'	Report

Stade de Marrakech, Marrakesh
Referee: Janny Sikazwe (Zambia)
3 December 2011
19:00

Gabon	3–1	Ivory Coast
Ndong Mba 46', 49' (pen.); Yacouya 78'		Traoré 30'

Ibn Batouta Stadium, Tangier
Referee: Slim Jedidi (Tunisia)

== Knockout stage ==
All times given as local time (UTC+1)

Semi finals
6 December
Senegal	0
Gabon (a.e.t.)	1
7 December
Egypt	2
Morocco	3

Final
10 December
Gabon	2
Morocco	1
Third place play-off
10 December
Senegal	0
Egypt	2

=== Semi-finals ===
6 December 2011
19:00

Senegal	0–1 (a.e.t.)	Gabon
	Report	Poko 119'

Ibn Batouta Stadium, Tangier
Referee: Janny Sikazwe (Zambia)

7 December 2011
19:00

Egypt	2–3	Morocco
Salah 36'; Shroyda 82'	Report	Barrada 1', 9'; Mokhtar 66'

Stade de Marrakech, Marrakesh
Referee: Néant Alioum (Cameroon)

=== Third place play-off ===
10 December 2011
14:30

Senegal	0–2	Egypt
	Report	Shroyda 32'; Gomaa 68'

Stade de Marrakech, Marrakesh
Referee: Slim Jedidi (Tunisia)

=== Final ===
10 December 2011
17:30

Gabon	2–1	Morocco
Obiang 33'; Nono 40'	Report	Mokhtar 21'

Stade de Marrakech, Marrakesh
Attendance: 15,000
Referee: Hamada Nampiandraza (Madagascar)

2011 CAF U-23 Championship winners

Gabon
First title

== Best eleven ==
The team of the tournament with substitutes:

- Goalkeeper: (Egypt) Ahmed El Shenawy
- Defenders: (Ivory Coast) Mahan Marc Goua, (Egypt) Moaz El-Henawy, (Gabon) Remy Ebanega, (Morocco) Zakarya Bergdich
- Midfielders: (South Africa) Sameehg Doutie, (Egypt) Hossam Hassan, (Morocco) Abdelaziz Barrada, (Nigeria) Raheem Lawal
- Forwards: (Morocco) Youness Mokhtar, (Senegal) Abdoulaye Sané
- Subs: (Senegal) Ousmane Mané (GK); (Egypt) Ahmed Hegazy and Mohamed Salah, (Gabon) Allen Nono, (Ivory Coast) Laglais Xavier Kouassi and Jean Michael Seri, (Morocco) Soufiane Bidaoui and Adnane Tighadouini, (Nigeria) Danny Uchechi, (Algeria) Mohamed Chalali

== Goalscorers ==
3 goals

- (Morocco) Abdelaziz Barrada
- (Nigeria) Raheem Lawal

2 goals

- (Egypt) Ahmed Shroyda
- (Gabon) Emmanuel Ndong Mba
- (Morocco) Youness Mokhtar
- (Nigeria) Danny Uchechi

1 goal

- (Algeria) Mehdi Benaldjia
- (Algeria) Baghdad Bounedjah
- (Ivory Coast) Georges Henri Griffiths
- (Ivory Coast) Moussa Koné
- (Ivory Coast) Lacina Traoré
- (Egypt) Ahmed Magdi
- (Egypt) Marwan Mohsen
- (Egypt) Mohamed Elneny
- (Egypt) Mohamed Salah
- (Egypt) Saleh Gomaa
- (Gabon) Johan Diderot Lengoualama
- (Gabon) Allen Nono
- (Gabon) Landry Obiang Obiang
- (Gabon) André Biyogo Poko
- (Gabon) Lionel Yacouya
- (Morocco) Adnane Tighadouini
- (Senegal) Kara Mbodj
- (Senegal) Abdoulaye Sané
- (Senegal) Omar Wade
- (South Africa) Phumelele Bhengu
- (South Africa) Mandla Masango

== Criticisms ==
Some have questioned the need for the tournament and believe that the CAF-organised Under-23 football tournament, the 2011 All-Africa Games' football tournament should have been used as a qualifying tournament. The increase in number of national U-23 fixtures caused some domestic league schedules to be revised and some league games took place with weakened teams.

There has been criticism from fans towards clubs who have not allowed their players to participate in the qualifying stages as the tournament is not featured on the FIFA Calendar whilst the Olympics tournament is. In effect this means that African nations can call on European-based players for the Olympic tournament who were not able to participate in qualifying due to club commitments.

== Qualified teams for Summer Olympics ==
The following three teams from CAF qualified for the 2012 Summer Olympics men's football tournament.

Team	Qualified on	Previous appearances in Summer Olympics^{1}
Gabon	6 December 2011	0 (Debut)
Morocco	6 December 2011	6 (1964, 1972, 1984, 1992, 2000, 2004)
Egypt	10 December 2011	10 (1920, 1924, 1928, 1936, 1948, 1952, 1960, 1964, 1984, 1992)
Senegal	23 April 2012	0 (Debut)

^{1} Bold indicates champions for that year.

== See also ==
- 2012 CAF Women's Pre-Olympic Tournament
