= Football at the 1991 All-Africa Games =

1991 All-Africa Games Football Tournament
Tournament details
- Host country: Egypt
- City: Cairo
- Dates: 21–30 September 1991
- Teams: 8 (from CAF (Africa) confederations)
- Venue: 2 (in 2 host cities)

Final positions
- Champions: Cameroon (1st title)
- Runners-up: Tunisia
- Third place: Nigeria
- Fourth place: Zimbabwe

Tournament statistics
- Matches played: 18
- Goals scored: 45 (2.5 per match)

The 1991 All-Africa Games football tournament was the 5th edition of the African Games men's football tournament. The football tournament was held in Cairo, Egypt between 21 and 30 September 1991 as part of the 1991 All-Africa Games.

== Qualification ==
The following countries qualified for the final tournament. For the first time, teams of Under-23 took part in the tournament.

Zone	Team
Hosts	Egypt
Zone I	Tunisia
Zone II	Mali
Zone III	Nigeria
Zone IV	Cameroon
Zone V	Uganda
Zone VI	Zimbabwe
Zone VII	Mauritius

== Final tournament ==
All times given as local time (UTC+2)

=== Group stage ===
Key to colours in group tables
Teams that advanced to the semifinals

==== Group A ====
Team	Pld	W	D	L	GF	GA	GD	Pts
Nigeria	3	3	0	0	11	2	9	9
Zimbabwe	3	2	0	1	5	4	1	6
Egypt	3	1	0	2	4	5	−1	3
Uganda	3	0	0	3	2	11	−9	0

21 September 1991

Egypt	1−2	Nigeria
Khashaba 60'		Babangida 47'; Amunike 88'

Ismailia Stadium, Ismailia
21 September 1991

Zimbabwe	2−1	Uganda

Ismailia Stadium, Ismailia

23 September 1991

Nigeria	8−1	Uganda

Ismailia Stadium, Ismailia
23 September 1991

Egypt	2−3	Zimbabwe

Ismailia Stadium, Ismailia

25 September 1991

Nigeria	1−0	Zimbabwe

Ismailia Stadium, Ismailia
25 September 1991

Egypt	1−0	Uganda

Ismailia Stadium, Ismailia

==== Group B ====
Team	Pld	W	D	L	GF	GA	GD	Pts
Tunisia	3	2	1	0	4	0	4	5
Cameroon	3	2	0	1	2	1	1	4
Mali	3	1	1	1	5	1	4	3
Mauritius	3	0	0	3	0	9	−9	0

22 September 1991

Cameroon	1−0	Mali

Alexandria Stadium, Alexandria
22 September 1991

Tunisia	3−0	Mauritius

Alexandria Stadium, Alexandria

24 September 1991

Mali	5−0	Mauritius

Alexandria Stadium, Alexandria
24 September 1991

Cameroon	0−1	Tunisia

Alexandria Stadium, Alexandria

26 September 1991

Mali	0−0	Tunisia

Alexandria Stadium, Alexandria
26 September 1991

Mauritius	0−1	Cameroon

Alexandria Stadium, Alexandria

=== Knockout stage ===
Fifth place
28 September – Ismailia
Egypt (p)	1 (5)
Mali	1 (4)
Seventh place
28 September – Alexandria
Mauritius	1
Uganda	0

==== 7th Place Match ====
28 September 1991

Mauritius	1−0	Uganda

Alexandria Stadium, Alexandria

==== 5th Place Match ====
28 September 1991

Egypt	1−1	Mali
Penalties
	5–4

Ismailia Stadium, Ismailia

Semifinals
28 September – Ismailia
Nigeria	0
Cameroon	1
28 September – Alexandria
Tunisia	3
Zimbabwe	1

Final
30 September – Cairo
Cameroon	1
Tunisia	0
Third place
30 September – Cairo
Nigeria	3
Zimbabwe	0

==== Semifinals ====
28 September 1991

Nigeria	0−1	Cameroon
		Bekombo 70'

Ismailia Stadium, Ismailia
Attendance: 4 000

28 September 1991

Tunisia	3−1	Zimbabwe
Chihi 25'; Bouhali 65'; Kebaier 75'		Silfa 35'

Alexandria Stadium, Alexandria
Attendance: 3 500

==== Third-place match ====
30 September 1991

Nigeria	3−0	Zimbabwe

Cairo International Stadium, Cairo
Attendance: 4 000

==== Final ====
30 September 1991

Cameroon	1−0	Tunisia
Kemadjou 7'

Cairo International Stadium, Cairo
Attendance: 5 000
Referee: Badara Sène (Senegal)

== Final ranking ==
Rank	Team	Pld	W	D	L	GF	GA	GD	Pts
1	Cameroon	5	4	0	1	4	1	+3	8
2	Tunisia	5	3	1	1	7	2	+5	7
3	Nigeria	5	4	0	1	14	3	+11	8
4	Zimbabwe	5	2	0	3	6	10	−4	4
Eliminated in the group stage
5	Egypt (H)	4	1	1	2	5	6	−1	3
6	Mali	4	1	2	1	6	2	+4	4
7	Mauritius	4	1	0	3	1	9	−8	2
8	Uganda	4	0	0	4	2	12	−10	0
