= Ahmed Sherweda =

Egyptian footballer (born 1990)

Personal information
- Date of birth: 21 October 1990 (age 36)
- Place of birth: Cairo, Egypt
- Height: 1.76 m (5 ft 9 in)
- Position: Forward

Senior career*
Years	Team	Apps	(Gls)
2009–2012	Al-Masry	24	(4)
2012–2013	Telephonat Bani Sweif	11	(1)
2013–2014	Al Ittihad	19	(8)
2014–2016	ENPPI		
2016–2017	Al Masry		
2017–2018	Al Ittihad		
2018	El Entag El Harby		
2018–2019	Nogoom	20	(3)
2019–2020	Haras El Hodoud	30	(6)

International career^{‡}
2014	Egypt	3	(0)
- * Club domestic league appearances and goals ‡ National team caps and goals as of 4 June 2014

Ahmed Sherweda (Arabic: أحمد شرويدة; born 21 October 1990) is an Egyptian football striker who plays for the Egyptian national team.

He has been called up for Egypt for the first time in 2011 for two games against Niger and Sierra Leone. He was called up again for the national team in 2014 for a friendly game against Jamaica.
