= 2012 Toulon Tournament squads =

Below are the squads for the 2012 Toulon Tournament. Each team had to submit 20 players.

== Group A ==
=== Egypt ===
Head coach: Hany Ramzy

No.	Pos.	Player	Date of birth (age)	Caps	Goals	Club
1	GK	Ali Lotfi	14 October 1989 (aged 22)	9	0	(Egyptian Football Association) ENPPI
2	DF	Salah Soliman	20 January 1990 (aged 22)	9	0	(Egyptian Football Association) Zamalek
3	DF	Ahmed Sobhi	4 March 1991 (aged 20)			(Egyptian Football Association) ENPPI
4	MF	Hesham Mohamed	3 January 1989 (aged 23)	10	1	(Egyptian Football Association) Al-Ahly
5	DF	Mahmoud Alaa	1 January 1991 (aged 21)	7	0	(Egyptian Football Association) Haras El-Hodood
6	DF	Ahmed Hegazy	25 January 1991 (aged 21)	7	0	(Italian Football Federation) Fiorentina
7	MF	Saleh Gomaa	1 August 1993 (aged 18)	16	2	(Egyptian Football Association) Al Mokawloon Al Arab
8	MF	Shehab El-Din Ahmed	22 August 1990 (aged 21)	15	1	(Egyptian Football Association) Al-Ahly
9	FW	Marwan Mohsen	26 February 1989 (aged 23)	27	19	(Egyptian Football Association) Petrojet
10	FW	Ahmed Shoukry	21 July 1989 (aged 22)	21	7	(Egyptian Football Association) Al-Ahly
11	MF	Ahmed Eid	May 15, 1980 (aged 32)	1	0	(Egyptian Football Association) Haras El-Hodood
12	DF	Islam Ramadan	1 November 1990 (aged 21)	8	0	(Egyptian Football Association) Haras El Hodood
13	DF	Ali Fathy	2 January 1992 (aged 20)	13	0	(Egyptian Football Association) Al-Mokawloon Al-Arab
14	MF	Hossam Hassan	30 April 1989 (aged 23)	25	1	(Egyptian Football Association) Al-Masry
15	DF	Saad Samir	1 April 1989 (aged 23)	9	0	(Egyptian Football Association) Al-Masry
16	GK	Ahmed El Shenawy	29 January 1991 (aged 21)	14	0	(Egyptian Football Association) Zamalek
17	MF	Mohamed Sobhi	21 November 1992 (aged 19)	0	0	(Egyptian Football Association) ENPPI
18	FW	Ahmed Magdi	9 December 1989 (aged 22)	11	1	(Egyptian Football Association) Ghazl El Mahalla
19	FW	Ahmed Shroyda	21 October 1990 (aged 21)	18	5	(Egyptian Football Association) Al-Masry
20	DF	Omar Gaber	30 January 1992 (aged 20)	12	1	(Egyptian Football Association) Zamalek

=== Japan ===
Head coach: Takashi Sekizuka.

No.	Pos.	Player	Date of birth (age)	Caps	Goals	Club
1	GK	Takuya Masuda	29 June 1989 (aged 22)	1	0	(Japan Football Association) Sanfrecce Hiroshima
2	DF	Gōtoku Sakai	14 March 1991 (aged 21)	5	0	(German Football Association) VfB Stuttgart
3	MF	Takahiro Ogihara	5 October 1991 (aged 20)	6	0	(Japan Football Association) Cerezo Osaka
4	DF	Yutaka Yoshida	17 February 1990 (aged 22)	2	0	(Japan Football Association) Shimizu S-Pulse
5	DF	Yusuke Higa	15 May 1989 (aged 23)	18	0	(Japan Football Association) Yokohama F. Marinos
6	MF	Kosuke Yamamoto	29 October 1989 (aged 22)	9	0	(Japan Football Association) Júbilo Iwata
7	FW	Yūki Ōtsu	24 March 1990 (aged 22)	3	2	(German Football Association) Borussia Mönchengladbach
8	DF	Kazuya Yamamura	2 December 1989 (aged 22)	17	1	(Japan Football Association) Kashima Antlers
9	FW	Yuya Osako	18 May 1990 (aged 22)	11	3	(Japan Football Association) Kashima Antlers
10	MF	Keigo Higashi	20 July 1990 (aged 21)	18	4	(Japan Football Association) Omiya Ardija
11	MF	Kota Mizunuma	22 February 1990 (aged 22)			(Japan Football Association) Sagan Tosu
12	DF	Mizuki Hamada	18 May 1990 (aged 22)			(Japan Football Association) Urawa Red Diamonds
13	DF	Daisuke Suzuki	29 January 1990 (aged 22)			(Japan Football Association) Albirex Niigata
14	DF	Kazuki Oiwa	17 August 1989 (aged 22)	0	0	(Japan Football Association) JEF United Ichihara Chiba
15	FW	Manabu Saitō	4 April 1990 (aged 22)	2	1	(Japan Football Association) Yokohama F. Marinos
16	MF	Taisuke Muramatsu	16 December 1989 (aged 22)			(Japan Football Association) Shimizu S-Pulse
17	FW	Hiroshi Ibusuki	27 February 1991 (aged 21)			(Royal Spanish Football Federation) Sevilla Atlético
18	GK	Shunsuke Ando	10 August 1990 (aged 21)	7	0	(Japan Football Association) Kawasaki Frontale
19	MF	Takashi Usami	6 May 1992 (aged 20)	4	0	(German Football Association) Bayern Munich
20	MF	Yoshiaki Takagi	9 December 1992 (aged 19)	0	0	(Royal Dutch Football Association) Utrecht

=== Netherlands ===
Head coach: Adrie Koster

No.	Pos.	Player	Date of birth (age)	Caps	Goals	Club
1	GK	Nick Marsman	1 October 1990 (aged 21)			(Royal Dutch Football Association) Twente
2	DF	Ties Evers	March 14, 1991 (aged 21)			(Royal Dutch Football Association) De Graafschap
3	MF	Ben Rienstra	June 5, 1990 (aged 21)			(Royal Dutch Football Association) Heracles Almelo
4	DF	Joël Veltman	January 15, 1992 (aged 20)			(Royal Dutch Football Association) Ajax
5	DF	Dico Koppers	3 January 1989 (aged 23)			(Royal Dutch Football Association) Ajax
6	MF	Maikel Kieftenbeld	June 26, 1990 (aged 21)			(Royal Dutch Football Association) Groningen
7	MF	Navarone Foor	4 February 1992 (aged 20)			(Royal Dutch Football Association) NEC
8	MF	Ricky van Haaren	June 21, 1991 (aged 20)			(Royal Dutch Football Association) Feyenoord
9	FW	Nacer Barazite	May 27, 1990 (aged 21)			(French Football Federation) AS Monaco
10	MF	Roland Alberg	6 August 1990 (aged 21)			(Royal Dutch Football Association) SBV Excelsior
11	FW	Ninos Gouriye	January 14, 1991 (aged 21)			(Royal Dutch Football Association) Heracles Almelo
12	DF	Ruben Ligeon	24 May 1992 (aged 19)			(Royal Dutch Football Association) Ajax
13	DF	Miquel Nelom	September 22, 1990 (aged 21)			(Royal Dutch Football Association) Feyenoord
14	MF	Davy Pröpper	September 2, 1991 (aged 20)			(Royal Dutch Football Association) Vitesse
15	MF	Kevin Jansen	8 April 1992 (aged 20)			(Royal Dutch Football Association) Excelsior
16	GK	Marco Bizot	March 10, 1991 (aged 21)			(Royal Dutch Football Association) Cambuur
17	MF	Jody Lukoki	November 15, 1992 (aged 19)			(Royal Dutch Football Association) Ajax
18	FW	Rick ten Voorde	20 June 1991 (aged 20)			(Royal Dutch Football Association) RKC Waalwijk
19	MF	Steven Berghuis	19 December 1991 (aged 20)			(Royal Dutch Football Association) VVV-Venlo
20	DF	Giliano Wijnaldum	August 31, 1992 (aged 19)			(Royal Dutch Football Association) AZ

=== Turkey A2 ===
Head coach: Gökhan Keskin

No.	Pos.	Player	Date of birth (age)	Caps	Goals	Club
1	GK	Ertuğrul Taşkıran	5 November 1989 (aged 22)	0	0	(Turkish Football Federation) Samsunspor
2	DF	Berat Çetinkaya	1 January 1991 (aged 21)	0	0	(Turkish Football Federation) Sakaryaspor
3	DF	İshak Doğan	9 August 1990 (aged 21)	0	0	(Turkish Football Federation) Ankaragücü
4	DF	Aykut Demir	22 October 1988 (aged 23)	0	0	(Turkish Football Federation) Gençlerbirliği
5	DF	Hikmet Balioğlu	4 August 1990 (aged 21)	0	0	(Turkish Football Federation) Manisaspor
6	MF	Kağan Söylemezgiller	4 March 1988 (aged 24)	0	0	(Turkish Football Federation) Karabükspor
7	MF	Ferhat Kiraz	2 January 1989 (aged 23)	0	0	(Turkish Football Federation) Boluspor
8	DF	Salih Dursun	12 July 1991 (aged 20)	0	0	(Turkish Football Federation) Sakaryaspor
9	FW	Tevfik Köse	12 July 1988 (aged 23)	0	0	(Turkish Football Federation) İstanbul BB
10	FW	Emre Güral	5 April 1989 (aged 23)	0	0	(Turkish Football Federation) Bucaspor
11	FW	Eren Tozlu	27 December 1990 (aged 21)	0	0	(Turkish Football Federation) Mersin İdman Yurdu
12	GK	Ozan Özenç	7 January 1993 (aged 19)	0	0	(Turkish Football Federation) Denizli Belediyespor
13	DF	Kemal Tokak	25 April 1989 (aged 23)	0	0	(Turkish Football Federation) Samsunspor
14	MF	Bülent Cevahir	13 February 1992 (aged 20)	0	0	(Turkish Football Federation) Manisaspor
15	MF	Abdülkadir Kayalı	30 January 1991 (aged 21)	0	0	(Turkish Football Federation) Orduspor
16	MF	İsmail Haktan Odabaşı	7 August 1991 (aged 20)	0	0	(Turkish Football Federation) Bursaspor
17	FW	Ali Kuçik	17 July 1991 (aged 20)	0	0	(Turkish Football Federation) Göztepe
18	MF	Necip Uysal	24 January 1991 (aged 21)	0	0	(Turkish Football Federation) Beşiktaş
19	DF	Furkan Şeker	17 March 1992 (aged 20)	0	0	(Turkish Football Federation) Denizlispor
20	MF	Erkan Kaş	10 September 1991 (aged 20)	0	0	(Turkish Football Federation) Çaykur Rizespor

== Group B ==
=== Belarus ===
Head coach: Georgi Kondratiev

No.	Pos.	Player	Date of birth (age)	Caps	Goals	Club
1	GK	Alyaksandr Hutar	18 April 1989 (aged 23)	0	0	(Football Federation of Belarus) BATE Borisov
2	MF	Stanislaw Drahun	4 June 1988 (aged 23)	0	0	(Football Federation of Belarus) Dinamo Minsk
3	DF	Alyaksey Hawrylovich	5 June 1990 (aged 21)	0	0	(Football Federation of Belarus) Naftan Novopolotsk
4	DF	Syarhey Palitsevich	9 April 1990 (aged 22)	0	0	(Football Federation of Belarus) Dinamo Minsk
5	MF	Dzmitry Baha	4 January 1990 (aged 22)	0	0	(Football Federation of Belarus) BATE Borisov
6	DF	Ihar Kuzmyanok	6 July 1990 (aged 21)	0	0	(Football Federation of Belarus) Gomel
7	MF	Mikhail Sivakow	16 January 1988 (aged 24)	0	0	(Royal Belgian Football Association) Zulte Waregem
8	FW	Aleksandr Perepechko	7 April 1989 (aged 23)	0	0	(Football Federation of Belarus) Belshina Bobruisk
9	FW	Maksim Skavysh	13 November 1989 (aged 22)	0	0	(Football Federation of Belarus) Belshina Bobruisk
10	FW	Vladimir Yurchenko	26 January 1989 (aged 23)	0	0	(Football Federation of Belarus) Torpedo-BelAZ Zhodino
11	FW	Andrey Varankow	8 February 1989 (aged 23)	0	0	(Football Federation of Belarus) Neman Grodno
12	GK	Pilip Vaitsiakhovich	26 March 1990 (aged 22)	0	0	(Swedish Football Association) IK Frej
13	MF	Illya Aleksiyevich	10 February 1991 (aged 21)	0	0	(Football Federation of Belarus) Gomel
14	MF	Vital Kibuk	7 January 1989 (aged 23)	0	0	(Football Federation of Belarus) Dinamo Minsk
15	MF	Artsyom Salavey	1 November 1990 (aged 21)	0	0	(Football Federation of Belarus) Torpedo-BelAZ Zhodino
16	MF	Mikhail Gordeichuk	23 October 1989 (aged 22)	0	0	(Football Federation of Belarus) Belshina Bobruisk
17	DF	Vital Hayduchyk	12 July 1989 (aged 22)	0	0	(Football Federation of Belarus) Brest
18	DF	Dzyanis Palyakow	17 April 1991 (aged 21)	0	0	(Football Federation of Belarus) BATE Borisov
19	FW	Uladzimir Khvashchynski	10 May 1990 (aged 22)	0	0	(Football Federation of Belarus) Brest
20	DF	Aleh Veratsila	10 July 1988 (aged 23)	0	0	(Football Federation of Belarus) Dinamo Minsk

=== France ===
Head coach: Francis Smerecki

No.	Pos.	Player	Date of birth (age)	Caps	Goals	Club
1	GK	Zacharie Boucher	7 March 1992 (aged 20)	2	0	(French Football Federation) Le Havre
2	DF	Lionel Carole	12 April 1991 (aged 21)	4	0	(French Football Federation) Sedan
3	DF	Timothée Kolodziejczak	1 October 1991 (aged 20)	13	0	(French Football Federation) Lyon
4	DF	Loïck Landre	20 June 1992 (aged 19)	4	0	(French Football Federation) Clermont
5	DF	Lindsay Rose	8 February 1992 (aged 20)	4	0	(French Football Federation) Laval
6	MF	Gueïda Fofana	16 May 1991 (aged 21)	13	2	(French Football Federation) Lyon
7	MF	Yannick Aguemon	11 February 1992 (aged 20)	2	1	(French Football Federation) Toulouse
8	MF	Alexandre Coeff	20 February 1992 (aged 20)	2	0	(French Football Federation) Lens
9	FW	Anthony Derouard	14 May 1992 (aged 20)	0	0	(French Football Federation) Le Mans
10	FW	Terence Makengo	22 June 1992 (aged 19)	1	1	(French Football Federation) AS Monaco
11	MF	Adrien Trebel	3 March 1991 (aged 21)	6	0	(French Football Federation) Nantes
12	DF	Djibril Sidibé	29 July 1992 (aged 19)	4	0	(French Football Federation) Troyes
13	DF	Florian Pinteaux	4 February 1992 (aged 20)	1	0	(French Football Federation) AS Monaco
14	MF	Arnaud Souquet	12 February 1992 (aged 20)	3	0	(French Football Federation) Paris
15	MF	Nampalys Mendy	23 June 1992 (aged 19)	4	0	(French Football Federation) AS Monaco
16	GK	Abdoulaye Diallo	30 March 1992 (aged 20)	2	0	(French Football Federation) Rennes
17	MF	Rémi Mulumba	2 November 1992 (aged 19)	1	1	(French Football Federation) Lorient
18	MF	Neeskens Kebano	10 March 1992 (aged 20)	2	0	(French Football Federation) Paris Saint-Germain
19	FW	Valère Germain	17 April 1990 (aged 22)	1	0	(French Football Federation) AS Monaco
20	FW	Nicolas de Préville	8 January 1991 (aged 21)	2	1	(French Football Federation) Istres

=== Mexico ===
Head coach: Luis Fernando Tena

No.	Pos.	Player	Date of birth (age)	Caps	Goals	Club
1	GK	Liborio Sánchez	October 9, 1989 (aged 22)			(Mexican Football Federation) Guadalajara
2	DF	Néstor Vidrio	March 22, 1989 (aged 23)			(Mexican Football Federation) Pachuca
3	DF	Hiram Mier	August 25, 1989 (aged 22)			(Mexican Football Federation) Monterrey
4	DF	Néstor Araujo	August 29, 1991 (aged 20)			(Mexican Football Federation) Cruz Azul
5	DF	Dárvin Chávez	November 21, 1989 (aged 22)			(Mexican Football Federation) Monterrey
6	MF	Héctor Herrera	April 19, 1990 (aged 22)			(Mexican Football Federation) Pachuca
7	MF	Javier Cortés	July 20, 1989 (aged 22)			(Mexican Football Federation) UNAM
8	MF	Jorge Hernández	June 10, 1989 (aged 22)			(Mexican Football Federation) Chiapas
9	MF	César Ibáñez	April 1, 1992 (aged 20)			(Mexican Football Federation) Santos Laguna
10	MF	Marco Fabián	August 21, 1989 (aged 22)			(Mexican Football Federation) Guadalajara
11	FW	Javier Aquino	February 11, 1990 (aged 22)			(Mexican Football Federation) Cruz Azul
12	GK	José Antonio Rodríguez	July 4, 1992 (aged 19)			(Mexican Football Federation) Guadalajara
13	DF	Diego Reyes	September 19, 1992 (aged 19)			(Mexican Football Federation) América
14	MF	Jorge Enríquez	January 8, 1991 (aged 21)			(Mexican Football Federation) Guadalajara
15	FW	Cándido Ramírez	June 6, 1993 (aged 18)			(Mexican Football Federation) Santos Laguna
16	DF	Miguel Ángel Ponce	April 12, 1989 (aged 23)			(Mexican Football Federation) Guadalajara
17	MF	Néstor Calderón	February 14, 1989 (aged 23)			(Mexican Football Federation) Toluca
18	DF	Hugo Rodríguez	July 8, 1990 (aged 21)			(Mexican Football Federation) Atlas
19	FW	Alan Pulido	March 8, 1991 (aged 21)			(Mexican Football Federation) Tigres UANL
20	FW	Raúl Jiménez	May 5, 1991 (aged 21)			(Mexican Football Federation) América

=== Morocco ===
Head coach: (Netherlands) Pim Verbeek

No.	Pos.	Player	Date of birth (age)	Caps	Goals	Club
1	GK	Mohamed Amsif	February 7, 1989 (aged 23)		0	(German Football Association) FC Augsburg
2	DF	Abdelatif Noussir	February 20, 1990 (aged 22)	0	0	
3	DF	Mohamed Abarhoun	May 1, 1989 (aged 23)	0	0	(Royal Moroccan Football Federation) Moghreb Tétouan
4	DF	Zouhair Feddal	January 1, 1989 (aged 23)		0	(Royal Spanish Football Federation) Espanyol B
5	MF	Yassine Haddou	May 21, 1989 (aged 23)	0	0	(French Football Federation) Nîmes
6	MF	Driss Fettouhi	July 30, 1989 (aged 22)			(French Football Federation) Istres
7	MF	Youness Mokhtar	August 20, 1991 (aged 20)			(Royal Dutch Football Association) FC Eindhoven
8	MF	Imad Najah	February 19, 1991 (aged 21)			(Royal Dutch Football Association) PSV
9	FW	Yacine Qasmi	January 3, 1991 (aged 21)	4	1	(French Football Federation) Rennes
10	MF	Zakaria Labyad	March 9, 1993 (aged 19)	10	4	(Royal Dutch Football Association) PSV
11	MF	Soufiane Bidaoui	April 20, 1990 (aged 22)			(Royal Belgian Football Association) Lierse
12	GK	Yassine Bounou	April 5, 1991 (aged 21)	0	0	(Royal Moroccan Football Federation) Wydad Casablanca
13	MF	Adnane Tighadouini	November 30, 1992 (aged 19)	2	1	(Royal Dutch Football Association) Volendam
14	DF	Redah Atassi	March 16, 1991 (aged 21)	1	0	(Royal Spanish Football Federation) Getafe B
15	FW	Anouar Kali	June 3, 1991 (aged 20)			(Royal Dutch Football Association) Utrecht
16	MF	Iliass Bel Hassani	September 16, 1992 (aged 19)		0	(Royal Dutch Football Association) Sparta Rotterdam
17	DF	Mehdi Bellaroussi		1	0	(Royal Moroccan Football Federation) COD Meknès
18	MF	Rayan Frikeche	October 9, 1991 (aged 20)	0	0	(French Football Federation) Angers
19	FW	Abderrazak Hamdallah	December 17, 1990 (aged 21)			
20	DF	Yassine Jebbour	January 24, 1991 (aged 21)			(French Football Federation) Rennes
