= Hiram Mier =

Mexican footballer (born 1989)

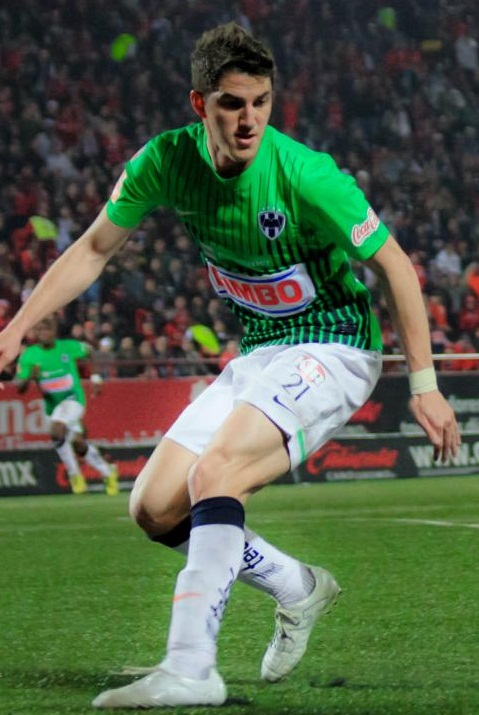
- Mier with Monterrey in 2012

Personal information
- Full name: Hiram Ricardo Mier Alanís
- Date of birth: 25 August 1989 (age 37)
- Place of birth: Monterrey, Nuevo León, Mexico
- Height: 1.81 m (5 ft 11 in)
- Position: Centre-back

Youth career
- 2007–2010: Monterrey

Senior career*
Years	Team	Apps	(Gls)
2008	Monterrey 1a. A	1	(0)
2010–2017	Monterrey	159	(1)
2017–2018	→ Querétaro (loan)	50	(1)
2018	Querétaro	19	(1)
2019–2023	Guadalajara	98	(0)

International career^{‡}
2011–2012	Mexico U23	26	(1)
2011–2018	Mexico	11	(0)
Medal record
Men's football
Representing Mexico
CONCACAF Gold Cup
Winner	CONCACAF Gold Cup	2011
Olympic Games
Gold medal – first place	2012 London	Team
Olympic Qualifying Championship
Winner	2012 United States
Toulon Tournament
Winner	2012 France	Team
Pan American Games
Gold medal – first place	2011 Guadalajara	Team
- * Club domestic league appearances and goals as of 22 April 2023 ‡ National team caps and goals as of 21 November 2018

Hiram Ricardo Mier Alanís (born 25 August 1989) is a Mexican former professional footballer who played as a centre-back. He is an Olympic gold medalist.

== Club career ==
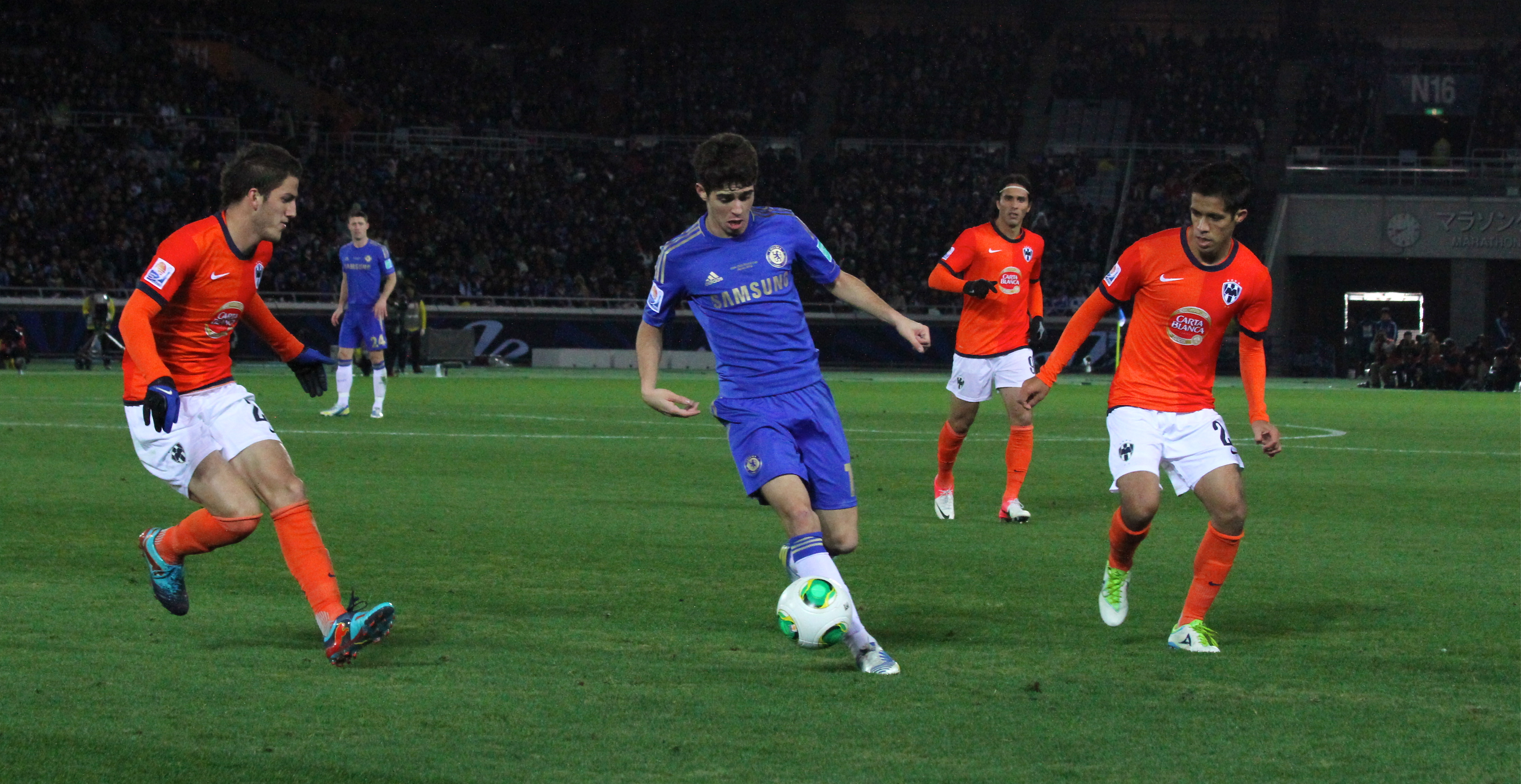
Hiram Mier (left) playing against Chelsea, defending Oscar at the 2012 FIFA Club World Cup.

Mier started his career with home-town club, Monterrey playing for their affiliate clubs in the Third and Segunda Divisions of Mexico football. He made his debut for the affiliate team in the Third Division in 2007. One year later Gerardo Jimenez called him to play for Rayados in the Second Division playing 11 games, 9 of them disputing the entire 90 minutes. He was promoted to the first team during the summer of 2010.

On August 25, 2010, Mier debuted with the first team in a game of 2010-11 CONCACAF Champions League against Seattle Sounders FC. Finally on October 2, 2010, he debuted in the Primera División in a win 2–1 over Necaxa. Mier became champion with his team in his debut season Apertura 2010 and then becoming champion in the 2010-11 CONCACAF Champions League. He has recently slotted at right-back for Monterrey during the end of the Clausura 2013 season.

On 14 December 2016, Mier joined Querétaro on a season-long loan. His move became permanent after the club activated his release clause.

On 7 December 2018, Guadalajara reached an agreement to sign Mier. On 7 December 2023, the club bid farewell to Mier.

== International career ==
=== Youth ===
==== 2011 Pan American Games ====
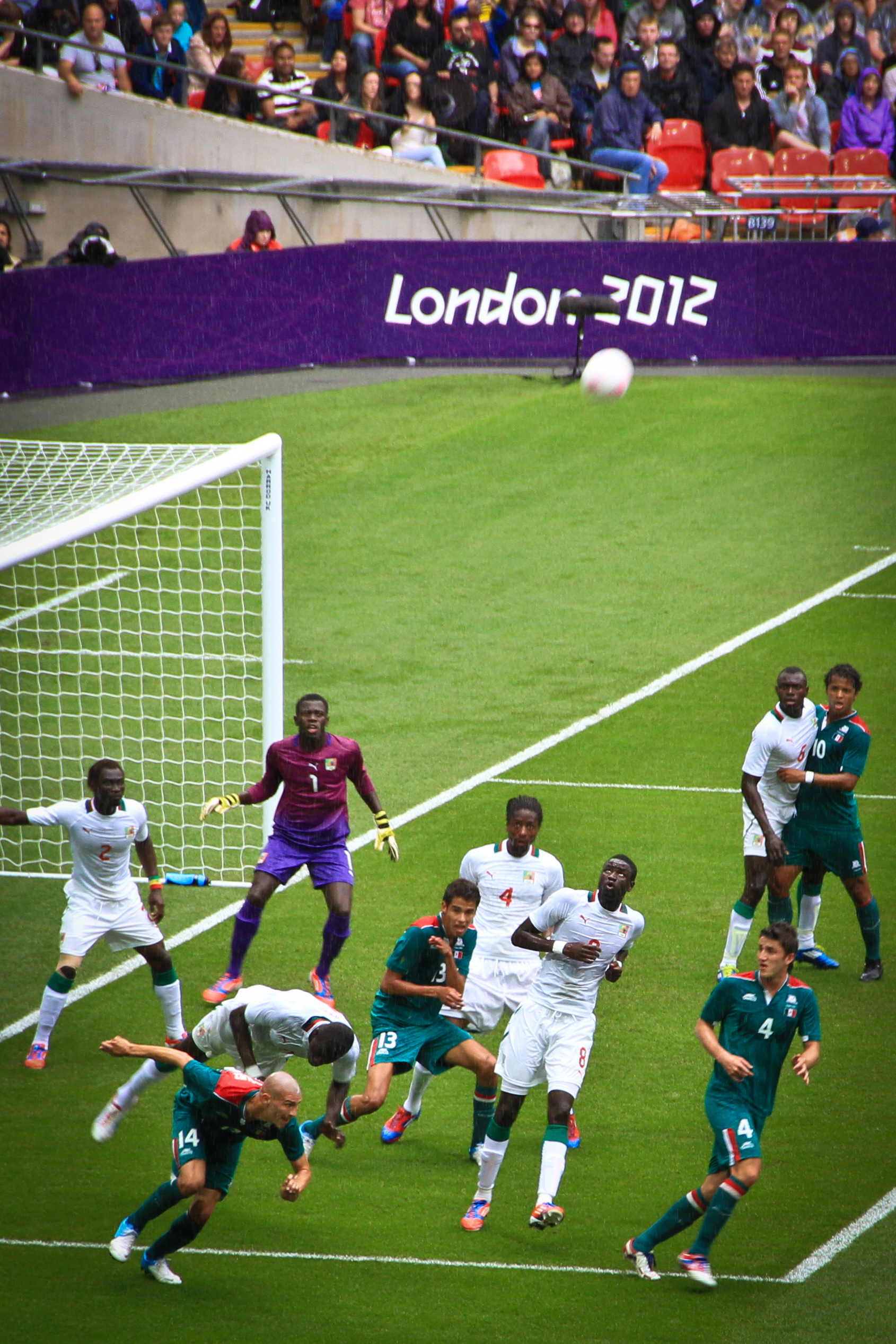
Hiram Mier (Mexican player on the bottom right) playing against Senegal U-23 at the 2012 London Olympics

He was called up to participate in the 2011 Pan American Games, Mexico ended up winning the final against Argentina 1–0.

==== 2012 Olympic qualifying ====
Mier was a squad member during the 2012 CONCACAF Olympic Qualifying Tournament and was selected as team captain. He led the Mexico team to win all of its matches including the final against Honduras, winning 2–1, in the tournament. He created a defensive doublet with Diego Reyes. Mexico qualified to the 2012 Summer Olympics after eight years, missing out on the 2008 edition.

==== 2012 Toulon Tournament ====
Once again Mier was selected as team captain in this Pre-Olympic Games tournament held in France. Mexico would make it to the final against Turkey winning 3–0 with Mier also managed to score in the final. This was Mexico's first title in this competition.

==== 2012 London Olympics ====
Mier made the final cut for those players participating in the 2012 Summer Olyimpics held in Great Britain. Mexico would make it to the final against Brazil winning the match 2–1. Mier played an important role by demonstrating leadership and team work alongside Diego Reyes. Mier played all 6 matches.

=== Senior ===
==== 2011 Gold Cup ====
Mier received his first call up to the senior national team after 5 players tested positive for Clenbuterol. Coach Jose Manuel de la Torre called up Mier and 4 players as substitutes to compete for the Gold Cup; Mier did not make an appearance and Mexico would win the tournament final after defeating the United States 4–2.

==== 2011 Copa America ====
On 23 May 2011, Mier was called up to the under-22 squad to participate in the 2011 Copa America, However Mexico was limited to take a team made entirely of players under age 22. Mier made his unofficial debut with the Mexico team, 4 July 2011 against Chile, playing all 90' minutes. Chile won the match 1–2. Hiram would go on and play all of the group matches in a center-back position disputing all 90' minutes of the matches, Mexico did not reach the knock-out stage of the tournament and was placed last in their group.

Mier officially made his debut with the Mexico national football team 31 May 2013 against Nigeria, in the Reliant Stadium, coming in for Francisco Rodríguez at half time. The match ended in a 2–2 tie for Mexico.

==== 2013 Confederations Cup ====
Mier was selected by coach Jose Manuel de la Torre to dispute the Confederation Cup held in Brazil. He made his debut in the Confederations cup against Italy coming in as a substitute for Javier Aquino in the 53rd minute of the match. Mier also played the full 90 minutes against Brazil and Japan playing as a right back.

==== 2014 FIFA World Cup Qualifying ====
Mier only played one 2014 World Cup qualifying match against arch rivals, United States; 10 September 2013 in the Columbus Crew Stadium in which Mexico lost 0–2. Mier was selected as one of the domestic league players to dispute the Intercontinental Play-off against New Zealand by new coach Miguel Herrera, however an injury caused by a right knee ligament rupture during a League match left him out for 7 months missing the 2014 World Cup also.

== Career statistics ==
=== International ===
As of match played 21 November 2018

National team	Year	Apps	Goals
Mexico	2011	3	0
Mexico	2013	5	0
Mexico	2014	1	0
Mexico	2015	1	0
Mexico	2018	1	0
Total		11	0

== Honours ==
Monterrey

- Mexican Primera División: Apertura 2010
- CONCACAF Champions League: 2010–11, 2011–12, 2012–13

Querétaro

- Supercopa MX: 2017

Mexico U23

- Pan American Games: 2011
- CONCACAF Olympic Qualifying Championship: 2012
- Toulon Tournament: 2012
- Olympic Gold Medal: 2012

Mexico

- CONCACAF Gold Cup: 2011
