= Javier Cortés =

Mexican footballer (born 1989)

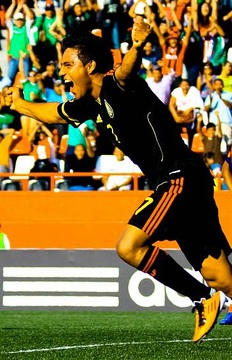
- Cortés with Mexico in 2012

Personal information
- Full name: Javier Cortés Granados
- Date of birth: 20 July 1989 (age 37)
- Place of birth: Mexico City, Mexico
- Height: 1.71 m (5 ft 7 in)
- Position: Midfielder

Youth career
- 2007–2009: UNAM

Senior career*
Years	Team	Apps	(Gls)
2007–2010	Pumas Morelos	49	(10)
2008–2017	UNAM	244	(25)
2017–2019	Santos Laguna	16	(0)
2019–2020	→ Atlético San Luis (loan)	6	(0)
Total		222	(38)

International career
2009	Mexico U20	2	(0)
2011–2012	Mexico U23	16	(2)
2012–2013	Mexico	2	(0)
Medal record
Men's football
Representing Mexico
Olympic Games
Gold medal – first place	2012 London	Team
Olympic Qualifying Championship
Winner	2012 United States
Toulon Tournament
Winner	2012 France	Team
- * Club domestic league appearances and goals

Javier Cortés Granados (born 20 July 1989) is a former Mexican professional footballer who played as a midfielder. He is an Olympic gold medalist.

== Club career ==
Javier Cortés began his playing in the Segunda División for Prepa Pumas in the Apertura 2007 season. He quickly moved to Pumas' second team, Pumas Morelos, in the same Apertura 2007 season. He made his Primera División debut for Pumas UNAM first team on 24 August 2008 in a match against Pachuca.

== International career ==
He was in the Mexico national football team in the gold medal match at the 2012 Summer Olympics when Mexico defeated Brazil, 2–1.

Cortés has capped twice for the Mexico national team.

== Career statistics ==
=== International ===
As of match played 17 April 2013

National team	Year	Apps	Goals
Mexico	2012	1	0
Mexico	2013	1	0
Total		2	0

== Honours ==
UNAM

- Mexican Primera División: Clausura 2011

Santos Laguna

- Liga MX: Clausura 2018

Mexico U23

- CONCACAF Olympic Qualifying Championship: 2012
- Toulon Tournament: 2012
- Olympic Gold Medal: 2012
