= Aleksandr Perepechko =

Belarusian footballer

Personal information
- Full name: Aleksandr Yuryevich Perepechko
- Date of birth: 7 April 1989 (age 37)
- Place of birth: Minsk, Belarusian SSR
- Height: 1.76 m (5 ft 9 1/2 in)
- Position: Midfielder

Youth career
- Arsenal Minsk

Senior career*
Years	Team	Apps	(Gls)
2007	Molodechno	13	(3)
2008–2010	Skonto Riga	19	(2)
2008–2009	→ Olimps Riga (loan)	33	(4)
2011	Dinamo Minsk	20	(2)
2012	Belshina Bobruisk	14	(0)
2013–2014	Dinamo Brest	49	(9)
2015	Slutsk	7	(0)
2015	Dinamo Brest	12	(1)
2016	Slutsk	19	(1)
2017	Isloch Minsk Raion	7	(0)
2018	Torpedo Minsk	2	(0)

International career^{‡}
2011	Belarus U21	5	(0)
2011–2012	Belarus Olympic	6	(0)
- * Club domestic league appearances and goals as of 31 December 2018 ‡ National team caps and goals as of 5 October 2011

Alyaksandr Yuryevich Perapechka (Belarusian: Аляксандр Перапечка, Russian: Александр Перепечко; born 7 April 1989) is a Belarusian former football midfielder.

== Career ==
Perepechko was a member of the Belarus U21 team that finished in 3rd place at the 2011 UEFA European Under-21 Football Championship. He was a late addition to squad, as he was a replacement for the injured Vladimir Yurchenko. Perepechko played in all five of the matches of the tournament. He was also part of the Belarus Olympic side that participated in the 2012 Toulon Tournament.

== Honours ==
Skonto Riga

- Virslīga champion: 2010
