= Diego Reyes =

Mexican footballer (born 1992)

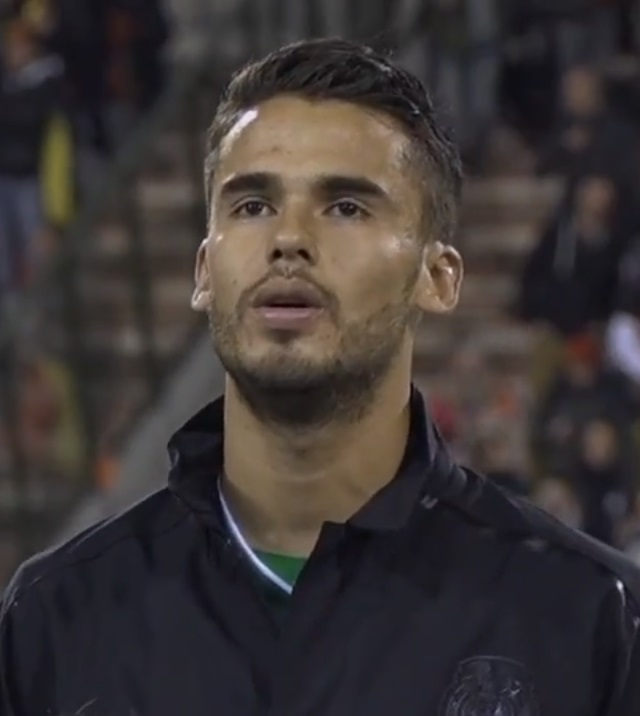
- Reyes with Mexico in 2017

Personal information
- Full name: Diego Antonio Reyes Rosales
- Date of birth: 19 September 1992 (age 34)
- Place of birth: Mexico City, Mexico
- Height: 1.92 m (6 ft 4 in)
- Positions: Centre-back; defensive midfielder

Team information
- Current team: Querétaro
- Number: 13

Youth career
- 2006–2009: América

Senior career*
Years	Team	Apps	(Gls)
2010–2013	América	82	(3)
2013–2015	Porto B	25	(3)
2013–2018	Porto	20	(2)
2015–2016	→ Real Sociedad (loan)	27	(2)
2016–2017	→ Espanyol (loan)	34	(1)
2018–2019	Fenerbahçe	8	(0)
2019	→ Leganés (loan)	6	(0)
2019–2025	UANL	136	(6)
2025–	Querétaro	39	(0)

International career^{‡}
2009	Mexico U17	6	(0)
2011	Mexico U20	13	(0)
2011–2012	Mexico U23	12	(1)
2011–2019	Mexico	65	(2)
Medal record
Men's football
Representing Mexico
CONCACAF Gold Cup
Winner	2015 United States-Canada	Team
Winner	2019 United States	Team
Olympic Games
Gold medal – first place	2012 London	Team
Olympic Qualifying Championship
Winner	2012 United States
Toulon Tournament
Winner	2012 France	Team
Pan American Games
Gold medal – first place	2011 Guadalajara	Team
FIFA U-20 World Cup
Third place	2011 Colombia
- * Club domestic league appearances and goals as of 14 November 2026 ‡ National team caps and goals as of 6 September 2019

Diego Antonio Reyes Rosales (Spanish pronunciation: [ˈdjeɣo anˈtonjo ˈreʝes]; born 19 September 1992) is a Mexican professional footballer who plays as a centre-back for Liga MX club Querétaro. He is an Olympic gold medalist.

Reyes made his professional debut with Club América, where he spent three years before moving overseas. In Europe, he played for Porto, Real Sociedad, Espanyol, Fenerbahçe, and Leganés, before returning to Mexico to sign with UANL.

At international level, Reyes has played for various national youth teams for Mexico, including the under-20 team which finished third at the 2011 FIFA U-20 World Cup. He was also a part of the under-23 squad that won the gold medal at the 2012 Summer Olympics, playing in every match. He has represented Mexico at the 2014 FIFA World Cup, as well as the 2013 and 2017 FIFA Confederations Cup.

== Club career ==
=== América ===
Reyes rose from América's youth academy and was considered one of their young prospects. He debuted for the club on 25 April 2010 at the age of 17 in a league match against Santos Laguna at the Estadio Azteca, appearing as a substitute in the 86th minute for Ángel Reyna who scored the game's only goal. Reyes scored his first goal against Estudiantes Tecos during the Clausura 2011 tournament. He would score his second goal against Morelia in a 2–3 quarter-final loss that same tournament. He gradually cemented his spot in the team's starting eleven.

Reyes played his final match with América on 26 May 2013, playing in the final of the Clausura tournament against Cruz Azul, though only playing in 26 minutes of the match. Due to the expulsion of Jesús Molina, Reyes was moved into the midfield, but was subsequently substituted off for Miguel Layún.

=== Porto ===
On 17 December 2012, it was announced Reyes would be transferring to Portuguese club FC Porto on 1 July 2013 for a €7 million transfer fee, with half of the €3.5 million transfer fee backed by Gol Football Luxembourg as part of James Rodríguez's repurchase from Gol Football.

Reyes made his debut for Porto on 13 July in the final of the Valais Cup against French club Marseille, coming on as a substitute in the 80th minute of the match. Fellow Mexican teammate Héctor Herrera also made his debut with Porto in the same match which ended in a 3–0 victory.

==== Loan to Real Sociedad ====
On 14 July 2015, Spanish La Liga club Real Sociedad announced they had reached an agreement with Porto over a season-long loan deal for Reyes, with no option to purchase outright. Reyes made his debut on 22 August in a 0–0 draw against Deportivo de La Coruña. On 18 October, he received his first red card with Real Sociedad in the 0–2 defeat to Atlético Madrid, receiving two yellow cards in the span of two minutes for dissent.

On 8 February 2016, Reyes scored his first goal for Real Sociedad in the 5–0 away win over RCD Espanyol.

==== Loan to Espanyol ====
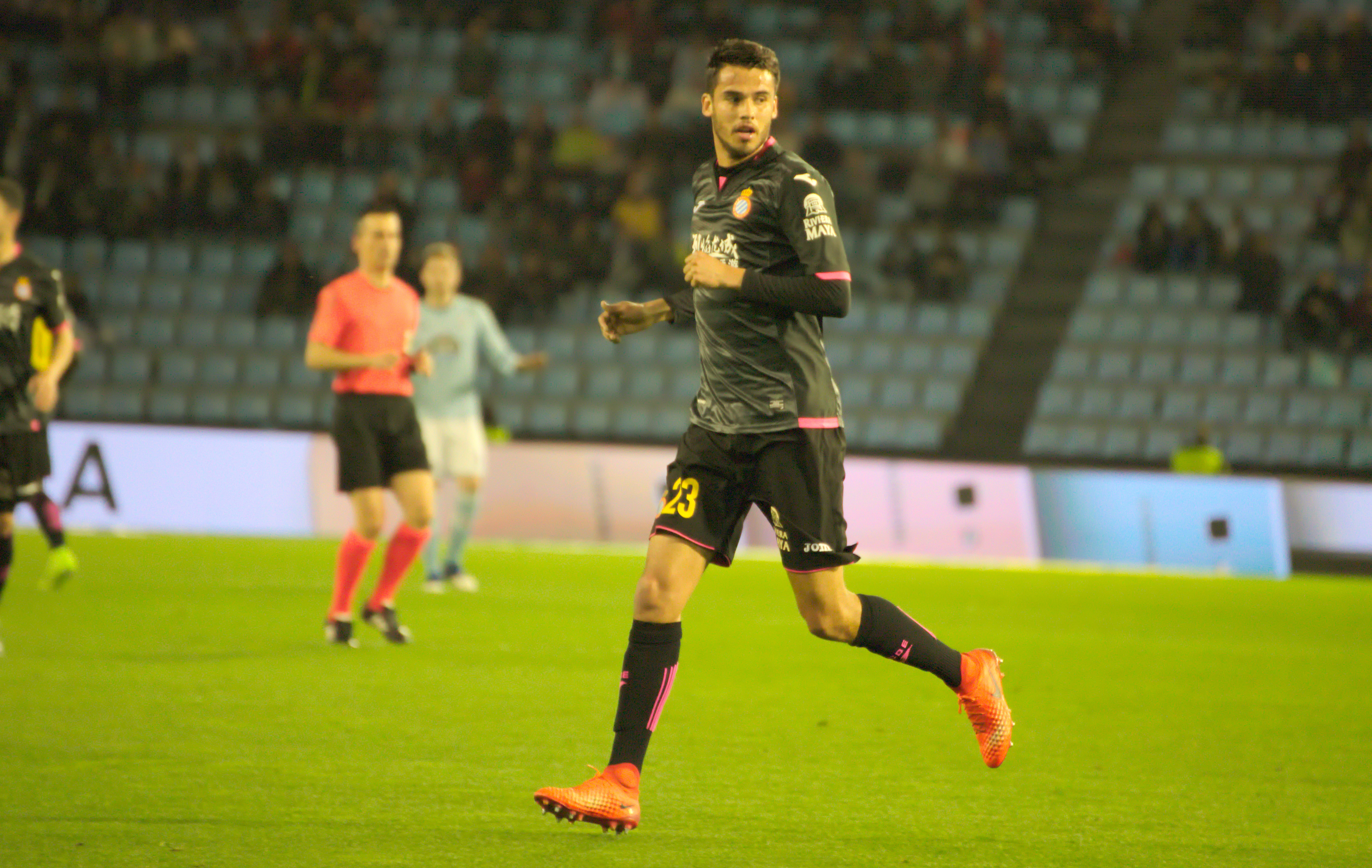
Reyes playing for Espanyol in 2017.

On 31 August 2016, Reyes joined Spanish side Espanyol on a season-long loan deal, with the club having the option to purchase the player at the end of the loan. On 30 October, Reyes scored his first goal for Espanyol in the 0–1 away win over Real Betis.

=== Fenerbahçe ===
On 25 August 2018, Reyes joined Turkish club Fenerbahçe on a three-year deal. On 1 September 2018, he would make his debut with the team in 2–3 loss against Kayserispor.

On 25 August 2019, Fenerbahçe terminated his contract.

==== Loan to Leganés ====
On 31 January 2019, Reyes returned to Spain by joining Leganés on loan for the rest of the season.

=== Later career ===
In August 2019, Reyes returned to Mexico to sign a four-year contract with UANL.

In August 2025, Reyes joined Querétaro.

== International career ==
=== Youth ===
Reyes was selected by coach José Luis González China to participate in the CONCACAF under-17 Championship in 2009. Mexico eventually qualified to the under-17 World Cup and reached the Round-of-16.

In 2010, Reyes played the Milk Cup with the under-20 team. The following year, Reyes was selected by coach Juan Carlos Chávez to participate in the CONCACAF under-20 Championship. Mexico qualified to the under-20 World Cup and finished in third place, defeating France 3–1. Prior to the World Cup, Reyes also participated in the Toulon Tournament.

Reyes was selected to participate in the 2011 Pan American Games with the under-23 national team. Mexico won the gold after defeating Argentina 1–0 in the Final.

In 2012, Reyes was a part of the under-23 team that won the gold medal at the 2012 Toulon Tournament, defeating Turkey 3–1 in the Final. He made the final cut for the squad participating in the 2012 Summer Olympics, where he played in every match, including in the 2–1 win over Brazil in the gold medal match at Wembley Stadium on 11 August. At 19 years old, Reyes was the youngest squad member at the Olympics.

=== Senior ===
Reyes made his debut with the senior national team at the 2011 Copa América; however, Mexico used their under-22 squad in the tournament. He made his full debut on 25 March 2013 in a 2014 World Cup qualification match against the United States at the Estadio Azteca. Reyes also participated in the 2013 FIFA Confederations Cup, playing his only match in a 2–1 victory against Japan.

Reyes captained Mexico for the first time during a friendly match against South Korea on 29 January 2014. He was given the captain's armband after Rafael Márquez was substituted off in the second half in the 4–0 victory.

Reyes played against the Netherlands in the 2014 FIFA World Cup round of 16 match. He entered the match as a substitute for Héctor Moreno, who suffered an injury in a slide-tackle with Arjen Robben.

In May 2018, Reyes was named in Mexico's squad for the World Cup, despite being at the time in recovery from a hamstring injury, he was subsequently ruled out of the tournament after not having satisfactory progress.

== Style of play ==
Reyes has been described as "intelligent in his positioning, comfortable in possession and strong in the air", as well as being praised for "his ability to time challenges play crisp passes and keep possession when under pressure". Though mainly a defender, Reyes has also been deployed as a defensive midfielder throughout his career.

== Career statistics ==
=== Club ===
As of match played on 14 November 2026

Club	Season	League			National cup (Note: Includes Copa MX, Taça de Portugal, Copa del Rey, Turkish Cup)		League cup (Note: Includes Taça da Liga)		Continental		Global		Other		Total	
Club	Season	Division	Apps	Goals	Apps	Goals	Apps	Goals	Apps	Goals	Apps	Goals	Apps	Goals	Apps	Goals
América	2009–10	Mexican Primera División	1	0	—		—		—		—		—		1	0
América	2010–11	Mexican Primera División	19	2	—		—		5 (Note: Appearances in Copa Libertadores)	0	—		—		24	2
América	2011–12	Mexican Primera División	27	0	—		—		—		—		—		27	0
América	2012–13	Liga MX	35	1	6	0	—		—		—		—		41	1
América	Total		82	3	6	0	—		5	0	—		—		93	3
Porto B	2013–14	Segunda Liga	18	3	—		—		—		—		—		18	3
Porto B	2014–15	Segunda Liga	7	0	—		—		—		—		—		7	0
Porto B	Total		25	3	—		—		—		—		—		25	3
Porto	2013–14	Primeira Liga	5	0	4	0	1	0	4 (Note: Appearances in UEFA Europa League)	0	—		—		14	0
Porto	2014–15	Primeira Liga	3	0	—		4	0	2 (Note: Appearances in UEFA Champions League)	0	—		—		9	0
Porto	2017–18	Primeira Liga	12	2	4	0	2	1	6	0	—		—		24	3
Porto	Total		20	2	8	0	7	1	12	0	—		—		47	3
Real Sociedad (loan)	2015–16	La Liga	27	2	1	0	—		—		—		—		28	2
Espanyol (loan)	2016–17	La Liga	34	1	1	0	—		—		—		—		35	1
Fenerbahçe	2018–19	Süper Lig	8	0	2	1	—		4	0	—		—		14	1
Leganés (loan)	2018–19	La Liga	6	0	—		—		—		—		—		6	0
UANL	2019–20	Liga MX	8	0	—		—		1 (Note: Appearances in CONCACAF Champions Cup)	0	—		1 (Note: Appearances in Leagues Cup)	0	10	0
UANL	2020–21	Liga MX	23	3	2 (Note: Appearances in Copa GNP por México)	0	—		—		3 (Note: Appearances in FIFA Club World Cup)	0	—		28	3
UANL	2021–22	Liga MX	29	1	—		—		—		—		1	0	30	1
UANL	2022–23	Liga MX	32	1	4 (Note: Three appearances in Copa Sky por México, one appearance in Campeón de Campeones)	0	—		2	0	—		—		38	1
UANL	2023–24	Liga MX	24	1	1 (Note: Appearance in Campeón de Campeones)	0	—		2	0	—		2	0	29	1
UANL	2024–25	Liga MX	20	0	—		—		—		—		4	1	24	1
UANL	Total		136	6	7	0	—		5	0	3	0	8	1	159	7
Querétaro	2025–26	Liga MX	24	0	—		—		—		—		—		24	0
Querétaro	2026–27	Liga MX	15	0	—		—		—		—		3	0	18	0
Querétaro	Total		39	0	—		—		—		—		3	0	42	0
Career total			377	17	25	1	7	1	26	0	3	0	11	1	449	20

=== International ===
As of 6 September 2019

Mexico
Year	Apps	Goals
2011	3	0
2013	7	0
2014	7	0
2015	14	0
2016	9	0
2017	13	1
2018	4	0
2019	8	1
Total	65	2

International goals

Scores and results list Mexico's goal tally first.

No	Date	Venue	Opponent	Score	Result	Competition
1.	28 March 2017	Hasely Crawford Stadium, Port of Spain, Trinidad and Tobago	Trinidad and Tobago	1–0	1–0	2018 FIFA World Cup qualification
2.	15 June 2019	Rose Bowl, Pasadena, United States	Cuba	3–0	7–0	2019 CONCACAF Gold Cup

== Honours ==
América

- Liga MX: Clausura 2013

Porto

- Primeira Liga: 2017–18

UANL

- Liga MX: Clausura 2023
- Campeón de Campeones: 2023
- CONCACAF Champions League: 2020
- Campeones Cup: 2023

Mexico U23

- Olympic Gold Medal: 2012
- Pan American Games: 2011
- CONCACAF Olympic Qualifying Championship: 2012
- Toulon Tournament: 2012

Mexico

- CONCACAF Gold Cup: 2015, 2019
- CONCACAF Cup: 2015

Individual

- Mexican Primera División Rookie of the Tournament: Clausura 2011
