= Jorge Hernández (footballer, born 1989) =

Mexican footballer (born 1989)

Personal information
- Full name: Jorge Daniel Hernández Govea
- Date of birth: 10 June 1989 (age 37)
- Place of birth: San Luis Potosí, Mexico
- Height: 1.70 m (5 ft 7 in)
- Position: Defensive midfielder

Senior career*
Years	Team	Apps	(Gls)
2008–2012	Chiapas	80	(1)
2012–2021	Pachuca	301	(2)
2022–2023	Querétaro	38	(0)

International career
2011–2012	Mexico U23	11	(0)
2017–2018	Mexico	6	(0)
Medal record
Men's football
Representing Mexico
Toulon Tournament
Winner	2012 France	Team
- * Club domestic league appearances and goals

Jorge Daniel Hernández Govea (born 10 June 1989), also known as El Burrito, is a Mexican former professional footballer who played as a defensive midfielder.

== Club career ==
=== Jaguares ===
Hernández made his professional debut on October 4, 2008, coming from the youth ranks of Chiapas. In 2010 Hernández scored a long range shot banger against Chivas de Guadalajara to open the score 1–0 in their eventual 4–0 victory.

=== Pachuca ===
On June 25, 2012, Hernández was presented as a C.F. Pachuca player after being transferred from Chiapas. Hernández won with C.F. Pachuca the Clausura 2016 tournament after winning on aggregated score 2–1.

== Career statistics ==
=== International ===
As of match played 28 March 2018

National team	Year	Apps	Goals
Mexico	2017	4	0
Mexico	2018	2	0
Total		6	0

== Honours ==
Pachuca

- Liga MX: Clausura 2016
- CONCACAF Champions League: 2016–17

Mexico U23

- Toulon Tournament: 2012
