= Vladimir Yurchenko =

Belarusian former footballer (born 1989)

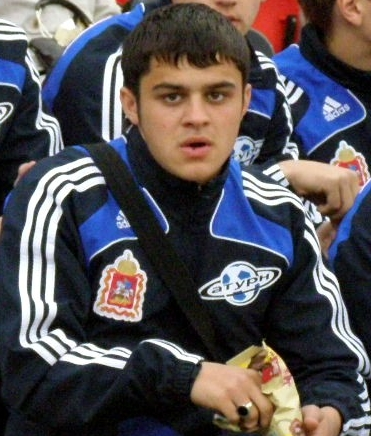
- Vladimir Yurchenko as a player of FC Saturn Ramenskoye

Personal information
- Full name: Vladimir Vasilyevich Yurchenko
- Date of birth: 26 January 1989 (age 37)
- Place of birth: Mogilev, Soviet Union
- Height: 1.72 m (5 ft 8 in)
- Position: Striker

Youth career
- Dnepr Mogilev

Senior career*
Years	Team	Apps	(Gls)
2006–2007	Dinamo Minsk	17	(3)
2008–2010	Saturn Ramenskoye	6	(1)
2010	→ Dnepr Mogilev (loan)	29	(9)
2011–2014	Shakhtyor Soligorsk	11	(0)
2012	→ Torpedo-BelAZ Zhodino (loan)	5	(0)
2012–2013	→ Dnepr Mogilev (loan)	32	(11)
2015	Dinamo Brest	11	(0)
2016–2017	Dnepr Mogilev	35	(6)
2017	Orsha	5	(1)
2018	Gorki	2	(0)
Total		153	(30)

International career
2008–2010	Belarus U21	18	(3)
2012	Belarus Olympic	3	(0)
- * Club domestic league appearances and goals as of 17 December 2018

Uladzimir Vasilyevich Yurchanka (Belarusian: Уладзімір Васілевіч Юрчанка; Russian: Владимир Васильевич Юрченко; born 26 January 1989) is a Belarusian former footballer.

== Career ==
Yurchenko made his debut for the U-21 national team on 9 September 2008, in a match against Latvia U21. He was part of the Belarus U21 side that participated in the 2009 UEFA European Under-21 Football Championship and made appearances in all three matches. On 12 August 2009, Yurchenko netted his first goal for the Belarus U21 team, opening the scoring against the Austria U21 in the 2–1 home win in a 2011 UEFA European Under-21 Football Championship qualifier. On 12 October 2010, Yurchenko netted twice to help his team to a 3–0 win against Italy U21, which secured qualification for the 2011 UEFA European Under-21 Football Championship.

On 2 November 2010, Yurchenko earned his first call-up to the senior team of his country, but was subsequently injured and withdrawn from the squad for the friendly match against Oman.

On 1 June 2011, Yurchenko was selected to take part in the 2011 UEFA European Under-21 Football Championship in Denmark, but was injured in a pre-tournament friendly and missed the competition. He was replaced by Aliaksandr Perepechka. Following his recovery from injury, he made the Belarusian squad for the 2012 Toulon Tournament and participated in all three group stage matches. He was also selected as part of the preliminary squad (including 43 players) for the 2012 London Olympics, but did not make the final cut of 22 (18 nominees + 4 reserves) footballers for the games.

== Honours ==
=== Club ===
Shakhtyor Soligorsk

- Belarusian Cup winner: 2013–14

=== Individual ===
- CIS Cup top goalscorer: 2008
