= Yassine Haddou =

Moroccan footballer (born 1989)

Personal information
- Date of birth: 21 May 1989 (age 37)
- Place of birth: Narbonne, France
- Height: 1.80 m (5 ft 11 in)
- Position: Defender

Team information
- Current team: FU Narbonne

Senior career*
Years	Team	Apps	(Gls)
2009–2013	Nîmes Olympique	73	(4)
2012–2013	Nîmes B	3	(1)
2013–2014	Olympique Safi	0	(0)
2014–2015	Boulogne	23	(0)
2015–2016	Amiens	17	(0)
2015	→ Amiens B	2	(0)
2017	Paulhan-Pézenas	10	(0)
2017–	FU Narbonne	7	(2)

International career
2011–2012	Morocco U20	5	(1)
- * Club domestic league appearances and goals as of 6 November 2017

Yassine Haddou (born 21 May 1989) is a professional footballer who plays as a defender for FU Narbonne. He formerly played for Nîmes Olympique for five seasons.

== International career ==
Haddou was born in France to Moroccan parents. He was called up by the Morocco national under-20 football team for the 2012 Toulon Tournament, and made one appearance.
