= Néstor Vidrio =

Mexican footballer (born 1989)

Personal information
- Full name: Néstor Vicente Vidrio Serrano
- Date of birth: 22 March 1989 (age 37)
- Place of birth: Guadalajara, Jalisco, Mexico
- Height: 1.82 m (6 ft 0 in)
- Position: Centre-back

Senior career*
Years	Team	Apps	(Gls)
2007–2009	Académicos	16	(0)
2008–2011	Atlas	84	(1)
2011–2013	Pachuca	30	(1)
2013–2015	Guadalajara	55	(2)
2015–2016	→ Sinaloa (loan)	28	(0)
2016	→ Juárez (loan)	6	(0)
2017	→ Sonora (loan)	17	(0)
2018–2019	UdeG	24	(2)
2019–2020	Puebla	51	(0)
2021–2023	Mazatlán	81	(2)
2024–2025	Venados	43	(3)

International career
2009	Mexico U20	3	(0)
2011–2012	Mexico U23	16	(0)
Medal record
Men's football
Representing Mexico
Olympic Games
Gold medal – first place	2012 London	Team
Toulon Tournament
Winner	2012 France	Team
- * Club domestic league appearances and goals as of 5 April 2025

Néstor Vicente Vidrio Serrano (Note: In this Spanish name, the first or paternal surname is Vidrio and the second or maternal family name is Serrano.) (born 22 March 1989), also known as Woody, is a Mexican professional footballer who plays as a centre-back. He is an Olympic gold medalist.

== Club career ==
=== Atlas ===
Vidrio came up in the Atlas youth systems and had a chance to debut for the first squad during the 2008 InterLiga tournament, thanks to then-coach Miguel Ángel Brindisi. Néstor later won Rookie of the Season for the Clausura 2008. Vidrio has earned himself a starting position as a defender for Atlas.

=== Pachuca ===
On 7 December 2011 Vidrio was transferred to C.F. Pachuca.

=== Guadalajara ===
On 1 July 2013 Vidrio signed with C.D. Guadalajara. He scored his first league goal in a match against Leones Negros on 7 September 2014.

== International career ==
Vidrio was capped by the under-20 team during the 2009 CONCACAF U-20 Championship. He played in all 3 games of the group stage.

Vidrio won the Olympic gold medal at the 2012 London Olympics with the under-23 side.

== U-23 international appearances ==
As of 11 August

International appearances
#	Date	Venue	Opponent	Result	Competition
1.	24 May 2012	Aubagne, France	Morocco	4–3	2012 Toulon Tournament
2.	26 May 2012	Nice, France	France	3–1	2012 Toulon Tournament
3.	28 May 2012	Le Lavandou, France	Belarus	1–2	2012 Toulon Tournament
4.	30 May 2012	Avignon, France	Netherlands	4–2	2012 Toulon Tournament
5.	1 June 2012	Hyères, France	Turkey	0–3	2012 Toulon Tournament
6.	5 July 2012	Estadio Leon, Guanajuato, Mexico	(Mexico) Club Leon	1–1	Friendly
7.	18 July 2012	Estadio Ramón de Carranza, Cádiz, Spain	Spain	1–0	Friendly
8.	21 July 2012	Nottingham, England	Japan	1–2	Friendly
9.	26 July 2012	St James' Park, Newcastle upon Tyne, England	South Korea	0–0	Football at the 2012 Summer Olympics – Men's tournament
10.	29 July 2012	City of Coventry Stadium, Coventry, England	Gabon	2–0	Football at the 2012 Summer Olympics – Men's tournament
11.	1 August 2012	Millennium Stadium, Cardiff, Wales	Switzerland	1–0	2012 Summer Olympics
12.	11 August 2012	Wembley Stadium, London, England	Brazil	2–1	Football at the 2012 Summer Olympics – Men's tournament

== Honours ==
Mexico U23

- Toulon Tournament: 2012
- Olympic Gold Medal: 2012
