= 2012 Toulon Tournament =

Toulon Youth Festival

Tournament details
- Host country: France
- Dates: 23 May – 1 June
- Teams: 8 (from 4 confederations)
- Venues: 8 (in 8 host cities)

Final positions
- Champions: Mexico (1st title)
- Runners-up: Turkey A2

Tournament statistics
- Matches played: 16
- Goals scored: 55 (3.44 per match)
- Top scorer(s): (Mexico) Marco Fabián (7 goals)
- Best player: (Mexico) Héctor Herrera

The 2012 Toulon Tournament was the 40th edition of the Toulon Tournament and took place from 23 May to 1 June. Colombia were the defending champions, but they did not participate this year.

Mexico U-23 won their first tournament title by defeating Turkey A2 3–0 in the final. Héctor Herrera was awarded Meilleur joueur as the most outstanding player of the tournament.

== Participating teams ==
- Belarus
- France
- Egypt
- Japan
- Mexico
- Morocco
- Netherlands
- Turkey A2

== Venues ==
The matches were played in these communes:

- Aubagne
- Avignon
- Hyères
- Le Lavandou
- La Seyne-sur-Mer
- La Valette-du-Var
- Nice
- Saint-Raphaël

== Results ==
All times are local (UTC+2).

=== Group A ===
Team	Pld	W	D	L	GF	GA	GD	Pts	Qualification
Netherlands	3	2	0	1	6	3	+3	6	Advance to Semi-final
Turkey A2	3	1	1	1	3	2	+1	4	Advance to Semi-final
Egypt	3	1	1	1	4	6	−2	4	
Japan	3	1	0	2	5	7	−2	3	

Source: Toulon Tournament
23 May 2012
17:45

Turkey A2	2–0	Japan
Oiwa 56' (o.g.); Tozlu 74'	Report

Stade Perruc, Hyères
Referee: Jérôme Efong Nzolo (Belgium)

23 May 2012
20:00

Egypt	0–3	Netherlands
	Report	Barazite 23'; Rienstra 67'; Ten Voorde 77'

Stade Perruc, Hyères
Referee: Ricardo Arellano Nieves (Mexico)

25 May 2012
17:45

Japan	3–2	Netherlands
Saito 5'; Ibusuki 43'; Ogihara 73'	Report	Gouriye 2'; Ten Voorde 46'

Stade de l'Estérel, Saint-Raphaël
Referee: Sergey Tsinkevich (Belarus)

25 May 2012
20:00

Egypt	1–1	Turkey A2
Gaber 71'	Report	Güral 4'

Stade de l'Estérel, Saint-Raphaël
Referee: Jérôme Efong Nzolo (Belgium)

27 May 2012
18:10

Japan	2–3	Egypt
Usami 41', 48'	Report	Eid 31'; Mohsen 37'; Soliman 73'

Le Grand Stade, Le Lavandou
Referee: Mounir Mabrouk (Morocco)

27 May 2012
18:10

Netherlands	1–0	Turkey A2
Alberg 10'	Report

Stade Vallis Laeta, La Valette-du-Var
Referee: Ricardo Arellano Nieves (Mexico)

=== Group B ===
Team	Pld	W	D	L	GF	GA	GD	Pts	Qualification
France	3	2	1	0	8	4	+4	7	Advance to Semi-final
Mexico	3	2	0	1	7	7	0	6	Advance to Semi-final
Morocco	3	0	2	1	5	6	−1	2	
Belarus	3	0	1	2	2	5	−3	1	

Source: Toulon Tournament
24 May 2012
17:45

Morocco	3–4	Mexico
Qasmi 28'; Labyad 43', 79' (pen.)	Report	Feddal 7' (o.g.); Fabián 34', 58', 80+3'

Stade de Lattre, Aubagne
Referee: Yudai Yamamoto (Japan)

24 May 2012
20:00

Belarus	1–3	France
Drahun 49' (pen.)	Report	De Préville 8'; Mulumba 59'; Makengo 72'

Stade de Lattre, Aubagne
Referee: Danny Makkelie (Netherlands)

26 May 2012
17:45

Belarus	0–0	Morocco
	Report

Stade du Ray, Nice
Referee: Sham Omar (Egypt)

26 May 2012
20:00

France	3–1	Mexico
Germain 9'; De Préville 13'; Landre 60'	Report	Fabián 35'

Stade du Ray, Nice
Referee: Yudai Yamamoto (Japan)

28 May 2012
18:00

Belarus	1–2	Mexico
Sivakov 44'	Report	Fabián 59', 80+3'

Le Grand Stade, Le Lavandou
Referee: Sham Omar (Egypt)

28 May 2012
18:00

France	2–2	Morocco
Trebel 23'; Makengo 51' (pen.)	Report	Frikeche 54'; Feddal 71'

Stade Marquet, La Seyne
Referee: Danny Makkelie (Netherlands)

== Knockout stage ==
Semi-finals
30 May – Avignon
Netherlands	2
Mexico	4
30 May – Avignon
France	0
Turkey A2	1

Final
1 June – Avignon
Mexico	3
Turkey A2	0
Third place
1 June – Avignon
Netherlands	3
France	2

All times are UTC+2

=== Semifinals ===
30 May 2012
17:30

Netherlands	2–4	Mexico
Van Haaren 10', 19'	Report	Herrera 14'; Ramírez 52'; Jiménez 54'; Fabián 78'

Parc des Sports, Avignon
Referee: Sergey Tsinkevich (Belarus)

30 May 2012
20:00

France	0–1	Turkey A2
	Report	Köse 19' (pen.)

Parc des Sports, Avignon
Referee: Mounir Mabrouk (Morocco)

=== Third place play-off ===
1 June 2012
18:30

Netherlands	3–2	France
Wijnaldum 3'; Barazite 38'; Ten Voorde 80'	Report	De Préville 73'; Germain 79'

Stade Perruc, Hyères
Referee: Ricardo Arellano Nieves (Mexico)

=== Final ===
1 June 2012
21:00

Mexico	3–0	Turkey A2
Ramírez 26'; Mier 71'; Pulido 78'	Report

Stade Perruc, Hyères
Referee: Jérôme Efong Nzolo (Belgium)

Mexico
Turkey

GK	12	José Antonio Rodríguez
RB	2	Néstor Vidrio
CB	3	Hiram Mier (c)	71'
CB	13	Diego Reyes
LB	5	Dárvin Chávez
DM	6	Héctor Herrera		(substituted off) 75'
CM	14	Jorge Enríquez
RW	11	Javier Aquino		(substituted off) 79'
LW	15	Cándido Ramírez	26'
ST	20	Raúl Jiménez		(substituted off) 65'
CF	10	Marco Fabián
Substitutions:
ST	19	Alan Pulido		(substituted on) 65'	78'
CM	8	Jorge Hernández		(substituted on) 75'
RW	18	César Ibáñez		(substituted on) 79'
Manager:
Luis Fernando Tena

GK	1	Ertuğrul Taşkıran (c)
DF	19	Furkan Şeker
DF	13	Kemal Tokak
DF	2	İshak Doğan
DF	8	Salih Dursun
MF	14	Bülent Cevahir
MF	16	İsmail Haktan Odabaşı
MF	18	Necip Uysal
MF	20	Erkan Kaş
FW	10	Emre Güral
FW	9	Tevfik Köse
Substitutes:
Manager:
Gökhan Keskin

== Goal scorers ==
7 goals

- (Mexico) Marco Fabián

3 goals

- (France) Nicolas de Préville
- (Netherlands) Rick ten Voorde

2 goals

- (France) Valère Germain
- (France) Terence Makengo
- (Japan) Takashi Usami
- (Mexico) Cándido Ramírez
- (Morocco) Zakaria Labyad
- (Netherlands) Nacer Barazite
- (Netherlands) Ricky van Haaren

1 goal

- (Belarus) Stanislaw Drahun
- (Belarus) Mikhail Sivakov
- (Egypt) Ahmed Eid
- (Egypt) Omar Gaber
- (Egypt) Marwan Mohsen
- (Egypt) Salah Soliman
- (France) Loïck Landre
- (France) Rémi Mulumba
- (France) Adrien Trebel
- (Japan) Hiroshi Ibusuki
- (Japan) Takahiro Ogihara
- (Japan) Manabu Saito
- (Morocco) Zouhair Feddal
- (Morocco) Ryane Frikeche
- (Morocco) Yacine Qasmi
- (Mexico) Héctor Herrera
- (Mexico) Raúl Jiménez
- (Mexico) Hiram Mier
- (Mexico) Alan Pulido
- (Netherlands) Roland Alberg
- (Netherlands) Ninos Gouriye
- (Netherlands) Ben Rienstra
- (Netherlands) Giliano Wijnaldum
- (Turkey) Emre Güral
- (Turkey) Tevfik Köse
- (Turkey) Eren Tozlu

Own goal

- (Japan) Kazuki Oiwa (playing against Turkey)
- (Morocco) Zouhair Feddal (playing against Mexico)

== Final standings ==
1. Mexico
2. Turkey A2
3. Netherlands
4. France
5. Egypt
6. Morocco
7. Japan
8. Belarus
