= Cándido Ramírez =

Mexican footballer (born 1993)

Personal information
- Full name: Cándido Saúl Ramírez Montes
- Date of birth: 5 June 1993 (age 33)
- Place of birth: León, Guanajuato, Mexico
- Height: 1.69 m (5 ft 7 in)
- Position: Winger

Youth career
- 2008: Cachorros de León FC
- 2008: Atlético San Francisco
- 2009: Zapateros Garra Leonesa
- 2010: Unión León
- 2011–2012: Santos Laguna

Senior career*
Years	Team	Apps	(Gls)
2011–2014	Santos Laguna	55	(2)
2013	→ UNAM (loan)	14	(2)
2014–2018	Monterrey	55	(5)
2016–2018	→ Atlas (loan)	11	(3)
2018	→ UAT (loan)	4	(0)
2019–2020	Morelia	23	(1)
2020–2021	Mazatlán	19	(0)
2022	Juárez	13	(0)

International career
2011–2012	Mexico U23	4	(3)
2016	Mexico	2	(0)
Medal record
Men's football
Representing Mexico
Toulon Tournament
Winner	2012 France	Team
- * Club domestic league appearances and goals as of 26 July 2022

Cándido Saúl Ramírez Montes (born 5 June 1993) is a Mexican professional footballer who plays as a winger.

== Club career ==
Ramírez began his career with Liga MX club Santos Laguna. In the Apertura 2013 he was loaned to UNAM. After an unsuccessful season he was loaned to C.F. Monterrey for the Clausura 2014. On 8 June 2016, Atlas made it official that Ramírez would join the club on loan for the Apertura 2016.

== International career ==
With two goals in the 2012 Toulon Tournament, Ramírez helped Mexico win the Tournament.

=== Under-23 international goals ===
#	Date	Venue	Opponent	Score	Result	Competition
1.	22 February 2012	Ciudad Nezahualcóyotl, Mexico	(Mexico) Toros Neza	4-1	4-2	Friendly
2.	30 May 2012	Avignon, France	Netherlands	2–2	4–2	2012 Toulon Tournament
3.	1 June 2012	Hyères, France	Turkey	0–1	0–3	2012 Toulon Tournament

=== U-23 International appearances ===
As of 1 June 2012

International appearances
#	Date	Venue	Opponent	Result	Competition
1.	22 February 2012	Ciudad Nezahualcóyotl, Mexico	(Mexico) Toros Neza	4-2	Friendly
2.	28 May 2012	Le Lavandou, France	Belarus	1–2	2012 Toulon Tournament
3.	30 May 2012	Avignon, France	Netherlands	4–2	2012 Toulon Tournament
4.	1 June 2012	Hyères, France	Turkey	0–3	2012 Toulon Tournament

== Honours ==
Santos Laguna

- Mexican Primera División: Clausura 2012

Mexico U23

- Toulon Tournament: 2012

Individual

- Toulon Tournament Best Goal: 2012
