= Tevfik Köse =

Turkish footballer (born 1988)

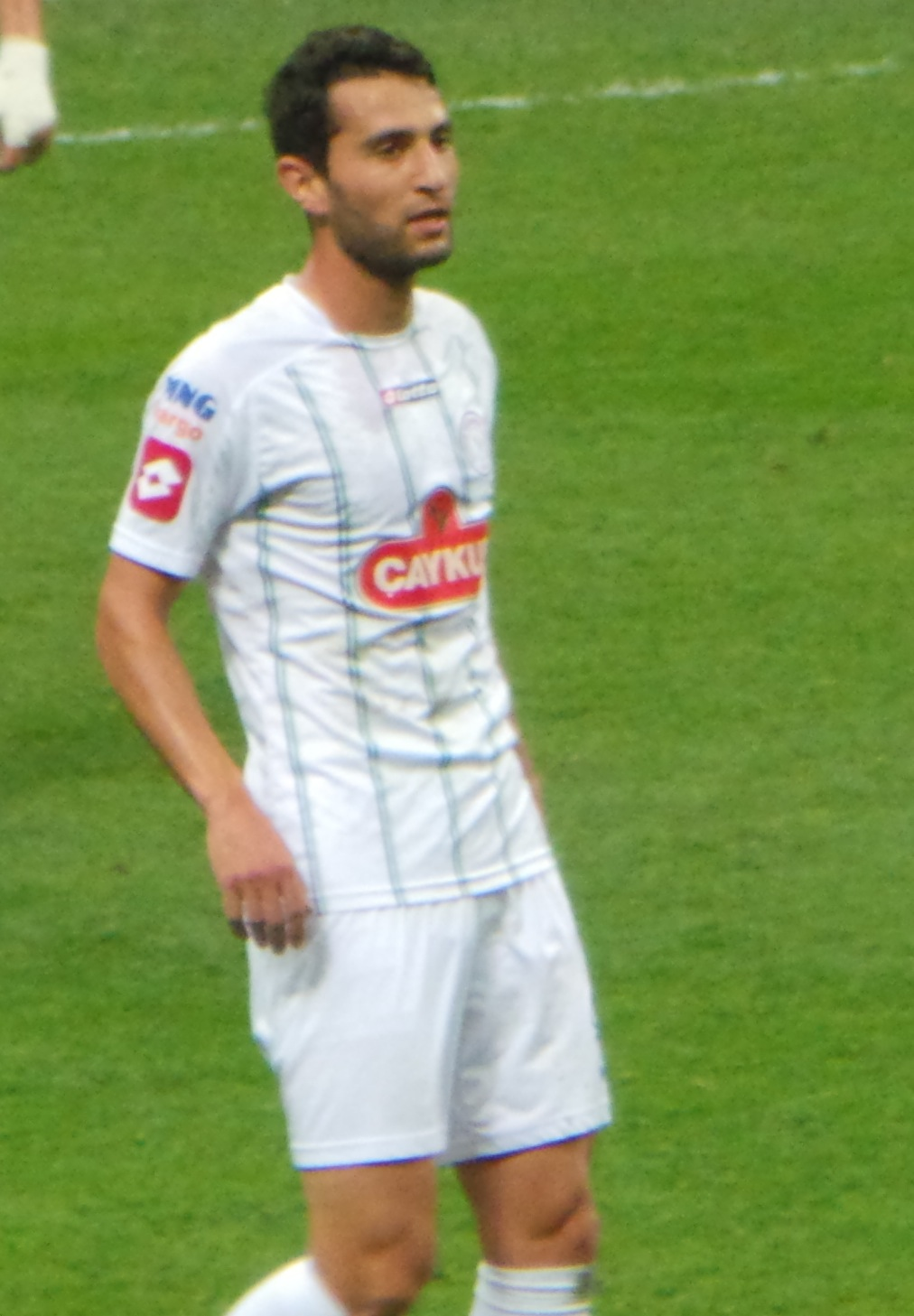

Personal information
- Full name: Tevfik Köse
- Date of birth: 12 July 1988 (age 38)
- Place of birth: Düsseldorf, Germany
- Height: 1.79 m (5 ft 10 in)
- Position: Forward

Team information
- Current team: DV Solingen
- Number: 61

Youth career
- 1999–2001: Fortuna Düsseldorf
- 2005–2009: Bayer Leverkusen

Senior career*
Years	Team	Apps	(Gls)
2005–2010	Bayer Leverkusen II	45	(10)
2007–2008	→ Ankaraspor (loan)	7	(1)
2008–2009	→ Kayserispor (loan)	6	(0)
2009–2013	İstanbul BB	79	(11)
2013–2015	Çaykur Rizespor	45	(5)
2015–2016	Boluspor	28	(9)
2016–2017	Adana Demirspor	10	(3)
2017	Gaziantep BB	12	(1)
2017–2018	Tuzlaspor	13	(3)
2018–2020	Sakaryaspor	23	(1)
2021–	DV Solingen	2	(0)

International career
2003–2004	Turkey U16	16	(15)
2004–2005	Turkey U17	17	(17)
2005–2006	Turkey U18	7	(2)
2006–2007	Turkey U19	12	(7)
2008	Turkey U20	2	(0)
2009–2010	Turkey U21	10	(3)
2011–2013	Turkey A2	13	(3)
- * Club domestic league appearances and goals as of 18:34, 26 September 2021 (UTC)

Tevfik Köse (born 12 July 1988) is a Turkish professional footballer who plays as a forward for German club DV Solingen.

== Club career ==
Tevfik Köse began his career with Fortuna Düsseldorf and signed in summer 2001 for Bayer Leverkusen. He started his professional career with Bayer Leverkusen in the 2005–06 season for the reserve team. After two years at Bayer Leverkusen he left Germany on loan for Ankaraspor in August 2007. After his return from loan he was loaned out to Kayserispor for the 2008–09 season .

On 31 December 2009, Köse signed with İstanbul Büyükşehir Belediyespor for two and a half years.

== International career ==
Köse was a part of Turkey's U17 squad at the FIFA U-17 World Championship. Tevfik Köse finished tied for second top scorer of the competition.

He was also part of the squad that finished runner-up in the 2012 Toulon Tournament and scored a goal in the 1–0 win against France in the semi-final.
