= Héctor Herrera =

Mexican footballer (born 1990)

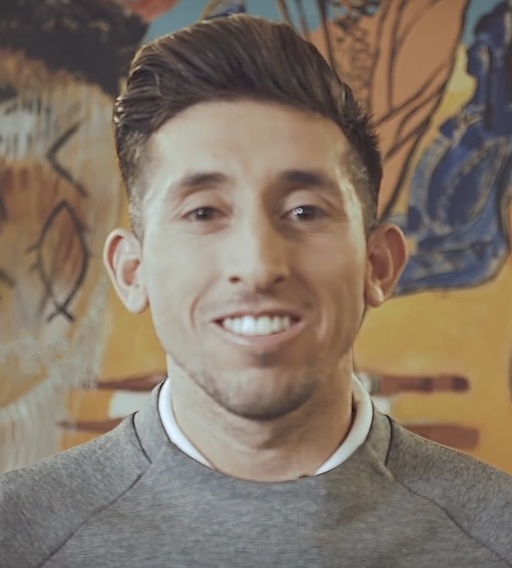
- Herrera in 2017

Personal information
- Full name: Héctor Miguel Herrera López
- Date of birth: 19 April 1990 (age 36)
- Place of birth: Tijuana, Baja California, Mexico
- Height: 1.80 m (5 ft 11 in)
- Position: Midfielder

Team information
- Current team: Houston Dynamo
- Number: 16

Youth career
- 2007–2011: Pachuca
- 2007–2008: → Cuautla (loan)
- 2011: → Tampico Madero (loan)

Senior career*
Years	Team	Apps	(Gls)
2011–2013	Pachuca	52	(2)
2013–2014	Porto B	8	(0)
2013–2019	Porto	164	(26)
2019–2022	Atlético Madrid	58	(1)
2022–2024	Houston Dynamo	62	(5)
2025	Toluca	34	(1)
2026–	Houston Dynamo	30	(3)

International career^{‡}
2012	Mexico U20	5	(1)
2012	Mexico U23	11	(1)
2012–2023	Mexico	105	(10)
Medal record
Men's football
Representing Mexico
CONCACAF Gold Cup
Winner	2015 United States	Team
Runner-up	2021 United States	Team
Olympic Games
Gold medal – first place	2012 London	Team
Olympic Qualifying Championship
Winner	2012 United States
Toulon Tournament
Winner	2012 France	Team
- * Club domestic league appearances and goals as of 7 November 2026 ‡ National team caps and goals as of 12 September 2023

Héctor Miguel Herrera López (Spanish pronunciation: [ˈeɣtoɾ eˈreɾa]; born 19 April 1990) is a Mexican professional footballer who plays as midfielder for Major League Soccer club Houston Dynamo.

Herrera made his professional debut with Pachuca, spending three years at the club before transferring to Portuguese side Porto. Over a six-year spell with Porto, he made more than 200 appearances across all competitions and won a Primeira Liga title. He subsequently joined Atlético Madrid, where he captured a La Liga championship, before later playing for Houston Dynamo and Toluca.

On the international stage, Herrera made over 100 appearances for the national team. He represented Mexico at the FIFA World Cup in 2014, 2018 and 2022, and at the 2012 Summer Olympics in London, where he became a gold medalist.

== Club career ==
=== Pachuca ===
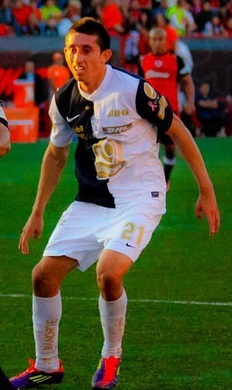
Herrera with Pachuca in 2012

Herrera began playing football for C.F. Pachuca's youth sides. As a youth, he was nicknamed Zorrillo (skunk), as well as Zorro (fox).

Herrera made his professional debut for Pachuca on 21 July 2010 in a 0–1 defeat to Major Soccer League side Chivas USA in a 2010 North American SuperLiga match. Herrera made his league debut for Pachuca in a 1–4 home defeat to Santos Laguna on 23 July 2011. Appearing 14 times for Pachuca in the 2011 Apertura, he was a shortlist candidate for best rookie of the tournament.

=== Porto ===
On 28 June 2013, it was announced that Herrera was transferred to Portuguese club Porto for €8 million. Herrera was an unused substitute in his first season's opening Super Cup match against Vitória de Guimarães on 10 August, ultimately winning 3–0. Eight days later, Herrera made his Primeira Liga debut, coming on as a substitute for Lucho González in the 82nd minute in Porto's 3–1 victory over Vitória de Setúbal. On 6 October, Herrera played his first 90 minutes in Porto's 3–1 away win over Arouca. On 18 September, Herrera made his UEFA Champions League debut against Austria Wien in a 1–0 group stage victory.

On 22 October, Herrera set a new UEFA Champions League record for the fastest dismissal for two yellow cards when he was sent off in the sixth minute of the group stage match against Zenit Saint Petersburg. Herrera scored his first league goal with Porto on 20 December in a 4–0 win against Olhanense, scoring on a volley just eight minutes after coming on as a substitute. In his first season with Porto, Herrera played in 17 league matches, and in 33 across all competitions, scoring three goals in total, all of which were scored in the league.

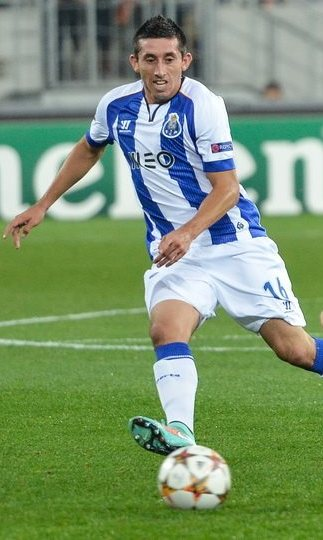
Herrera with Porto during a Champions League match in 2014.

On 20 August 2014, Herrera scored his first goal in Champions League play in Porto's 1–0 win over Lille. On 25 November, he played an important role in Porto's 3–0 Champions League away win over Belarusian club BATE Borisov, scoring the first goal of the game and providing two assists, all in the second-half. Herrera was included in The Guardian's year end list of "The 100 Best Footballers in the World".

On 22 August 2015, Herrera scored his first goal of the season in Porto's 1–1 draw against Marítimo at the Estádio dos Barreiros. In December, Herrera was given the Dragão de Ouro Award as the team's best player of the previous season, the first Mexican to win the honour. On 12 February 2016, Herrera, wearing the captain's arm-band, scored the equalizer in Porto's 2–1 win over archrivals Benfica. Herrera was called up for the final of the Taça de Portugal against Braga on 22 May 2016, playing in the 120 minutes of the match and failing to convert his penalty shot in the subsequent 3–2 shoot-out defeat.

On 15 April 2018, Porto defeated Benfica 1–0 at the Estádio da Luz, with Herrera scoring in the 90th minute from a shot outside the box. The win took Porto to the top of the table with 76 points, two ahead of Benfica with four matches remaining in the season. His goal was ultimately voted as the season's best. On 5 May, after a 0–0 draw between Benfica and Sporting CP, Porto won the league title with two games left to play. Herrera featured in the season's Team of the Year, one of five Porto players included.

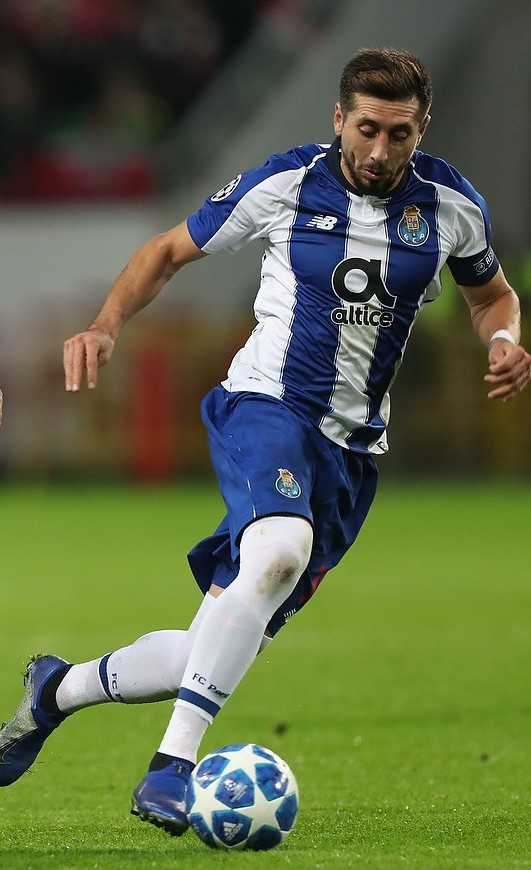
Herrera with Porto during a Champions League match against Lokomotiv Moscow in 2018.

On 4 August 2018, Herrera began the 2018–19 season captaining Porto in their 3–1 win over Aves to clinch the Supertaça Cândido de Oliveira. On 22 September, Herrera made his 200th appearance for Porto in all competitions following a 2–0 victory over Vitória Setúbal. In March 2019, he captained Porto in their 4–3 aggregate victory over Roma in the Champions League round of 16, with Porto reaching the quarter-finals for the first time since the 2014–15 competition. On 30 March, Herrera, in captaining Porto to a 3–2 victory against Braga, made his 237th appearance in all competitions for the Dragões, placing him fifth in the club's all-time list of appearances by a foreign player, four games behind Lucho González.

Amid reports linking him to Atlético Madrid, Porto president Pinto da Costa confirmed Herrera would leave the club on the expiration of his contract. On 18 May, Herrera scored in his final Primeira Liga game with Porto in the team's 2–1 victory over Sporting CP, scoring a scissor kick from a corner kick. He was again included in the season's Team of the Year.

=== Atlético Madrid ===
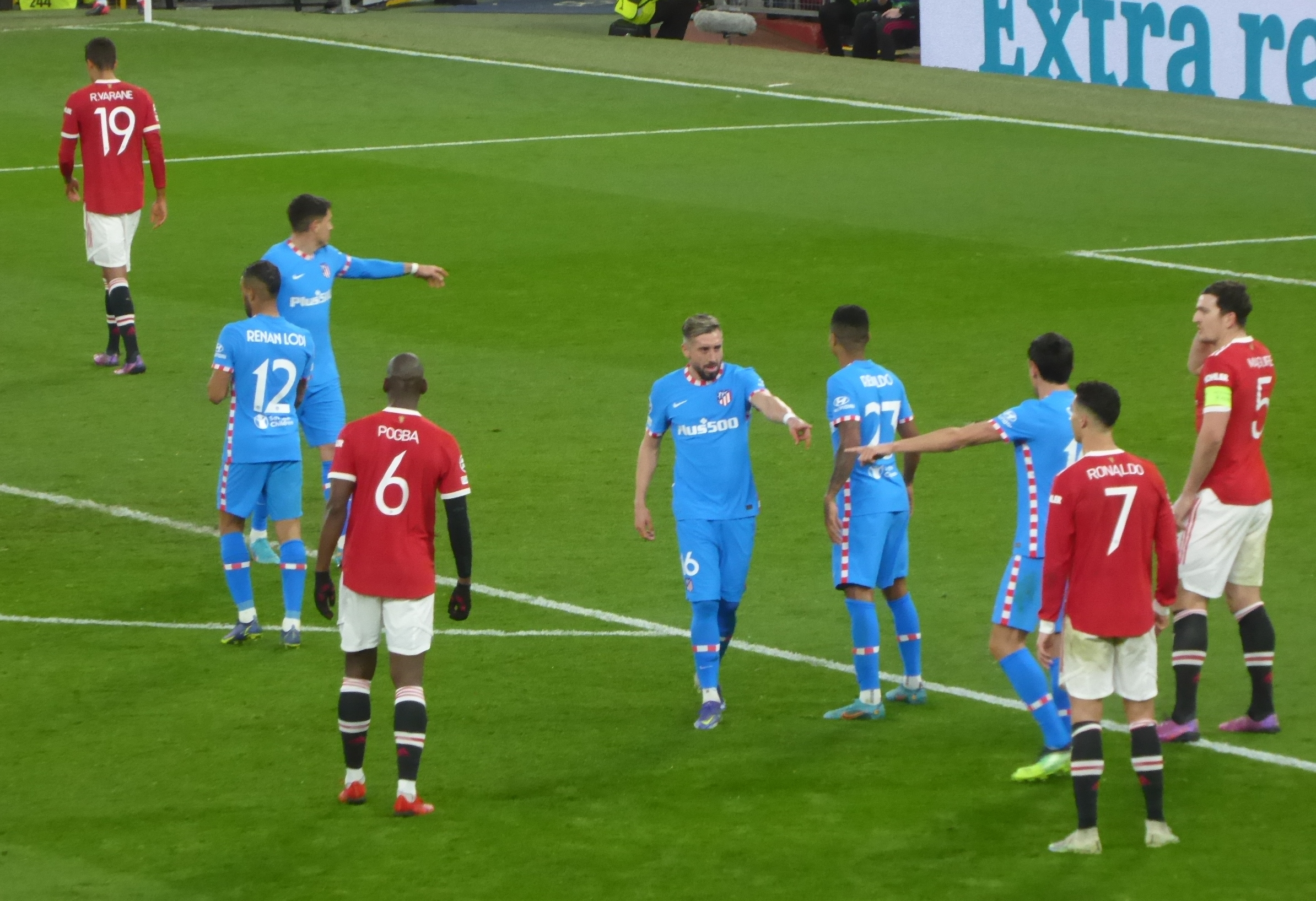
Herrera (center) playing against Manchester United during the 2021–22 UEFA Champions League

On 3 July 2019, Atlético Madrid announced via their website that they had reached an agreement with Herrera. He signed a three-year contract, and was officially presented at the Wanda Metropolitano with the number 16 shirt. After failing to appear for Los Rojiblancos in the first month of the season, he made his competitive debut on 18 September, coming on as a late substitute for Thomas Partey and scoring the equalizer in the 90th minute to salvage a 2–2 draw against Juventus in the opening group game of the UEFA Champions League. Three days later, Herrera made his debut in La Liga as a starter against Celta de Vigo, playing 60 minutes in a scoreless draw.

He was a starter in both Supercopa de España matches against Barcelona and Real Madrid, finishing runner-up against the latter in the final. He made 30 appearances across all competitions in his debut season with Atlético, though his playing time was mostly hampered due to injuries.

At the start of the 2020–21 season Herrera was on a positive run of form, featuring eight times in all competitions and starting in the team's last four games prior to the international break, before being ruled out of action in November. It was reported that he had suffered a grade two injury to his left thigh while on international duty with Mexico, and would be out of action for a month. On his return on 1 December, Herrera, with 47, surpassed Javier Hernández as the Mexican with most UEFA Champions League appearances, coming on as a substitute in a 1–1 group stage draw against Bayern Munich. He again faced a spell on the sidelines, both due to injury and testing positive for COVID-19 in February.

In December 2021, Herrera tested positive for COVID-19 a second time.

=== Houston Dynamo ===
On 2 March 2022, Major League Soccer club Houston Dynamo announced that it had signed Herrera on a pre-contract agreement through the 2024 season with an option for 2025. He committed to the club as a Designated Player.

On 3 November 2024, during a MLS Cup match, Herrera was sent off in the 65th minute for spitting towards a referee following a disagreement on a foul. He was handed a three-game suspension and was fined an undisclosed amount.

On 6 November, Houston Dynamo opted not to pick up Herrera's contract option and released him.

=== Toluca ===
On 2 January 2025, Herrera returned to Liga MX, joining Toluca. During his time with the club, he helped the team win two league championships. He departed on 7 January 2026.

=== Return to Houston Dynamo ===
On 14 January 2026, Herrera signed with Houston Dynamo, starting his second spell with the club.

== International career ==
=== Youth ===
In 2012, Herrera was chosen by coach Luis Fernando Tena to participate in the 2012 CONCACAF Olympic Qualifying Tournament held in the United States. Mexico went on to win the tournament by defeating Honduras in the final, thus qualifying to the 2012 Olympic Games held in London.

Herrera was a vital part in the Mexico squad that won the 2012 Toulon Tournament, and was awarded the Meilleur Joueur (Best Player), the most outstanding player of the tournament.

Herrera made the final cut for those participating in the 2012 Summer Olympics. Mexico won the gold medal after defeating Brazil 2–1 in the final.

=== Senior ===
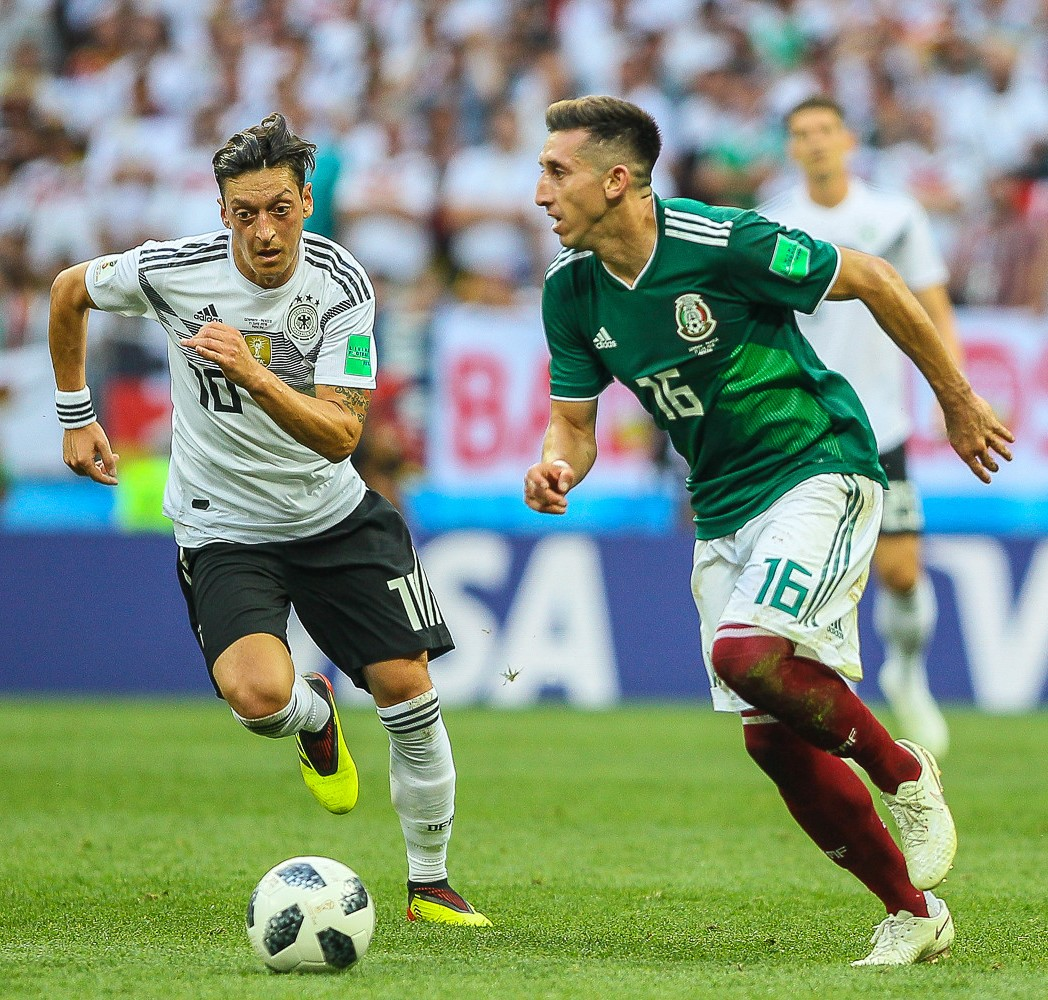
Herrera (right) playing against Germany at the 2018 FIFA World Cup

In 2012, Herrera was called up by coach José Manuel de la Torre to play for Mexico in the World Cup qualifiers against Guyana on 12 October and El Salvador on 16 October. He made his senior national team debut against El Salvador, a 2–0 win for Mexico.

On 7 June 2013, Herrera was called up to participate in the 2013 FIFA Confederations Cup. He made only one appearance, in a 0–2 loss to host-nation Brazil, coming on as a substitute for Gerardo Flores in the 58th minute of the match.

On 8 May 2014, Herrera was included in the final 23-man roster participating in the 2014 FIFA World Cup by Miguel Herrera. He was a starter in all three of Mexico's group stage matches, as well as playing in the 1–2 round-of-16 loss to the Netherlands. On 4 September 2015, Herrera netted his first goal with Mexico in a friendly against Trinidad and Tobago, scoring off of a corner kick pass from outside of the box, tying the match 3–3. Four days later, he scored his second goal in a 2–2 draw against Argentina.

Herrera was included in the roster for the 2015 CONCACAF Gold Cup. Despite a dip in form following a superb season with Porto, he appeared in all games except the final against Jamaica as Mexico won 3–1. He was called up by interim manager Ricardo Ferretti to participate in the subsequent CONCACAF Cup – a play-off match to determine CONCACAF's entry into the 2017 FIFA Confederations Cup – against the United States. Mexico won the match 3–2 during overtime.

On 17 May 2016, Herrera was listed on the roster for the Copa América Centenario by Juan Carlos Osorio. On 5 June, in Mexico's first group stage match against Uruguay, Herrera scored the third goal in the 3–1 victory.

On 8 June 2017, he was listed on the roster for the 2017 FIFA Confederations Cup. He would go on to appear in all five matches as Mexico lost the third place play-off against Portugal with a score of 2–1. With three assists, Herrera finished as the assist leader of the tournament.

On 28 May 2018, Herrera captained the national team in a scoreless draw to Wales in preparation for the World Cup. On 4 June, Herrera was included in the final 23-man squad for the tournament. In the first group stage match against Germany, which Mexico won 1–0, Herrera's performance was praised in particular. He would appear as a starter in all three group stage matches and the round-of-16 match against Brazil, where Mexico lost 2–0.

In May 2019, Herrera issued a statement via Twitter confirming that he would not form part of the national squad participating at the CONCACAF Gold Cup, citing fitness concerns as well as wanting to decide his "professional future" as his contract with Porto was expiring. Under Gerardo Martino, he reappeared with Mexico in the friendly match against the United States on 6 September, and played all 90 minutes in El Tri's 3–0 victory. The following month, Herrera captained Mexico in the CONCACAF Nations League fixtures against Bermuda and Panama, scoring off of a free kick layoff in a 5–1 victory against the former.

In June 2021, Herrera participated in the Concacaf Nations League Finals, reaching the final against the United States, losing 2–3. He was included in the Best XI of the tournament. He participated in the subsequent CONCACAF Gold Cup, appearing as captain in the first two group stage matches due to Héctor Moreno being unfit. Losing the final to the United States 0–1, he was awarded the Golden Ball for best player of the tournament.

On 5 June 2022, Herrera played his 100th match for Mexico in a friendly game against Ecuador.

In October 2022, Herrera was named in Mexico's preliminary 31-man squad for the 2022 FIFA World Cup, and in November, he was ultimately included in the final 26-man roster.

== Style of play ==
"Physically [Herrera] is very strong. He seems sluggish, but he is very powerful. Porto have a good eye for signing players of great quality, and Herrera is one of them."

— Former Bayern Munich manager Pep Guardiola prior to their Champions League match against Porto in 2015.

Herrera is described as a box-to-box midfielder, capable of halting opposing advances and able to distribute the ball or shoot the ball on target. He is also known for his pace and dynamism, as well as being capable of breaking up opposition attacks with his tough tackling and starting his team's own forays forward with his sharp distribution and tireless running.

Herrera has cited Juan Román Riquelme as an idol and an influence on his playing style.

== Personal life ==
In June 2019, Herrera obtained Portuguese citizenship after residing in Portugal for six years. On November 21, 2026, Herrera was arrested in Montgomery County, Texas, on suspicion of driving under the influence of alcohol.

== Career statistics ==
=== Club ===
As of match played 7 November 2026

Appearances and goals by club, season and competition
Club	Season	League			National cup (Note: Includes Copa MX, Taça de Portugal, Copa del Rey and U.S. Open Cup)		League cup (Note: Includes Taça da Liga and MLS Cup playoffs)		Continental		Other		Total	
Club	Season	Division	Apps	Goals	Apps	Goals	Apps	Goals	Apps	Goals	Apps	Goals	Apps	Goals
Pachuca	2011–12	Mexican Primera División	27	0	—		—		1 (Note: Appearance in North American SuperLiga)	0	—		28	0
Pachuca	2012–13	Liga MX	25	2	2	0	—		—		—		27	2
Pachuca	Total		52	2	2	0	—		1	0	—		55	2
Porto B	2013–14	Segunda Liga	8	0	—		—		—		—		8	0
Porto	2013–14	Primeira Liga	17	3	4	0	2	0	8 (Note: Three appearances in UEFA Champions League, five appearances in UEFA Europa League)	0	—		31	3
Porto	2014–15	Primeira Liga	33	3	1	0	1	0	11 (Note: Appearances in UEFA Champions League)	4	—		46	7
Porto	2015–16	Primeira Liga	29	9	3	0	—		6 (Note: Four appearances in UEFA Champions League, two appearances in UEFA Europa League)	0	—		38	9
Porto	2016–17	Primeira Liga	23	2	1	0	3	0	8	0	—		35	2
Porto	2017–18	Primeira Liga	29	3	4	1	3	0	6	1	—		42	5
Porto	2018–19	Primeira Liga	33	6	6	1	4	0	9	2	1 (Note: Appearance in Supertaça Cândido de Oliveira)	0	53	9
Porto	Total		164	26	19	2	13	0	48	7	1	0	245	35
Atlético Madrid	2019–20	La Liga	21	0	1	0	—		6	1	2 (Note: Appearances in Supercopa de España)	0	30	1
Atlético Madrid	2020–21	La Liga	16	0	—		—		5	0	—		21	0
Atlético Madrid	2021–22	La Liga	21	0	1	0	—		4	0	1	0	27	0
Atlético Madrid	Total		58	0	2	0	—		15	1	3	0	78	1
Houston Dynamo	2022	MLS	10	0	—		—		—		—		10	0
Houston Dynamo	2023	MLS	30	4	5	1	5	1	—		4 (Note: Appearances in Leagues Cup)	0	44	6
Houston Dynamo	2024	MLS	22	1	1	0	2	0	—		3	1	28	2
Houston Dynamo	Total		62	5	6	1	7	1	—		7	1	82	8
Toluca	2024–25	Liga MX	17	0	—		—		—		—		17	0
Toluca	2025–26	Liga MX	17	1	—		—		—		2 (Note: One appearance in Campeón de Campeones, one appearance in Leagues Cup)	0	19	1
Toluca	Total		34	1	—		—		—		2	0	36	1
Houston Dynamo	2026	MLS	30	3	3	0	0	0	—		—		33	3
Career total			408	37	32	3	20	1	64	8	13	1	537	50

=== International ===
As of match played 12 September 2023

Appearances and goals by national team and year
National team	Year	Apps	Goals
Mexico	2012	1	0
Mexico	2013	8	0
Mexico	2014	14	0
Mexico	2015	14	3
Mexico	2016	11	1
Mexico	2017	13	1
Mexico	2018	9	0
Mexico	2019	4	1
Mexico	2020	2	0
Mexico	2021	17	4
Mexico	2022	11	0
Mexico	2023	1	0
Total		105	10

Scores and results list Mexico's goal tally first, score column indicates score after each Herrera goal.

List of international goals scored by Héctor Herrera
No.	Date	Venue	Opponent	Score	Result	Competition
1.	4 September 2015	Rio Tinto Stadium, Sandy, United States	Trinidad and Tobago	3–3	3–3	Friendly
2.	9 September 2015	AT&T Stadium, Arlington, United States	Argentina	2–0	2–2	Friendly
3.	13 November 2015	Estadio Azteca, Mexico City, Mexico	El Salvador	2–0	3–0	2018 FIFA World Cup qualification
4.	5 June 2016	University of Phoenix Stadium, Glendale, United States	Uruguay	3–1	3–1	Copa América Centenario
5.	6 October 2017	Estadio Alfonso Lastras, San Luis Potosí, Mexico	Trinidad and Tobago	3–1	3–1	2018 FIFA World Cup qualification
6.	11 October 2019	Bermuda National Stadium, Devonshire Parish, Bermuda	Bermuda	5–1	5–1	2019–20 CONCACAF Nations League A
7.	3 July 2021	Los Angeles Memorial Coliseum, Los Angeles, United States	Nigeria	1–0	4–0	Friendly
8.	3 July 2021	Los Angeles Memorial Coliseum, Los Angeles, United States	Nigeria	3–0	4–0	Friendly
9.	29 July 2021	NRG Stadium, Houston, United States	Canada	2–1	2–1	2021 CONCACAF Gold Cup
10.	16 November 2021	Commonwealth Stadium, Edmonton, Canada	Canada	1–2	1–2	2022 FIFA World Cup qualification

== Honours ==
Porto

- Primeira Liga: 2017–18
- Supertaça Cândido de Oliveira: 2013, 2018

Atlético Madrid

- La Liga: 2020–21

Houston Dynamo

- U.S. Open Cup: 2023

Toluca

- Liga MX: Clausura 2025, Apertura 2025
- Campeón de Campeones: 2025
- Campeones Cup: 2025

Mexico U23

- Olympic Gold Medal: 2012
- CONCACAF Olympic Qualifying Championship: 2012
- Toulon Tournament: 2012

Mexico

- CONCACAF Gold Cup: 2015
- CONCACAF Cup: 2015
- CONCACAF Nations League runner-up: 2019–20

Individual

- Toulon Tournament Best Player: 2012
- FC Porto Player of the Year: 2014–15
- FIFA Confederations Cup Assist Leader: 2017
- Primeira Liga Team of the Year: 2017–18, 2018–19
- SPJF Goal of the season: 2017–18
- CONCACAF Best XI: 2017, 2018, 2021
- Primeira Liga Goal of the Month: April 2018
- Primeira Liga Midfielder of the Month: April 2018
- IFFHS CONCACAF Team of the Year: 2020, 2021
- CONCACAF Nations League Finals Best XI: 2021
- CONCACAF Gold Cup Golden Ball: 2021
- CONCACAF Gold Cup Best XI: 2021
- MLS All-Star: 2023, 2024
- MLS Best XI: 2023

== See also ==
- List of men's footballers with 100 or more international caps
