= Hikmet Balioğlu =

Turkish footballer

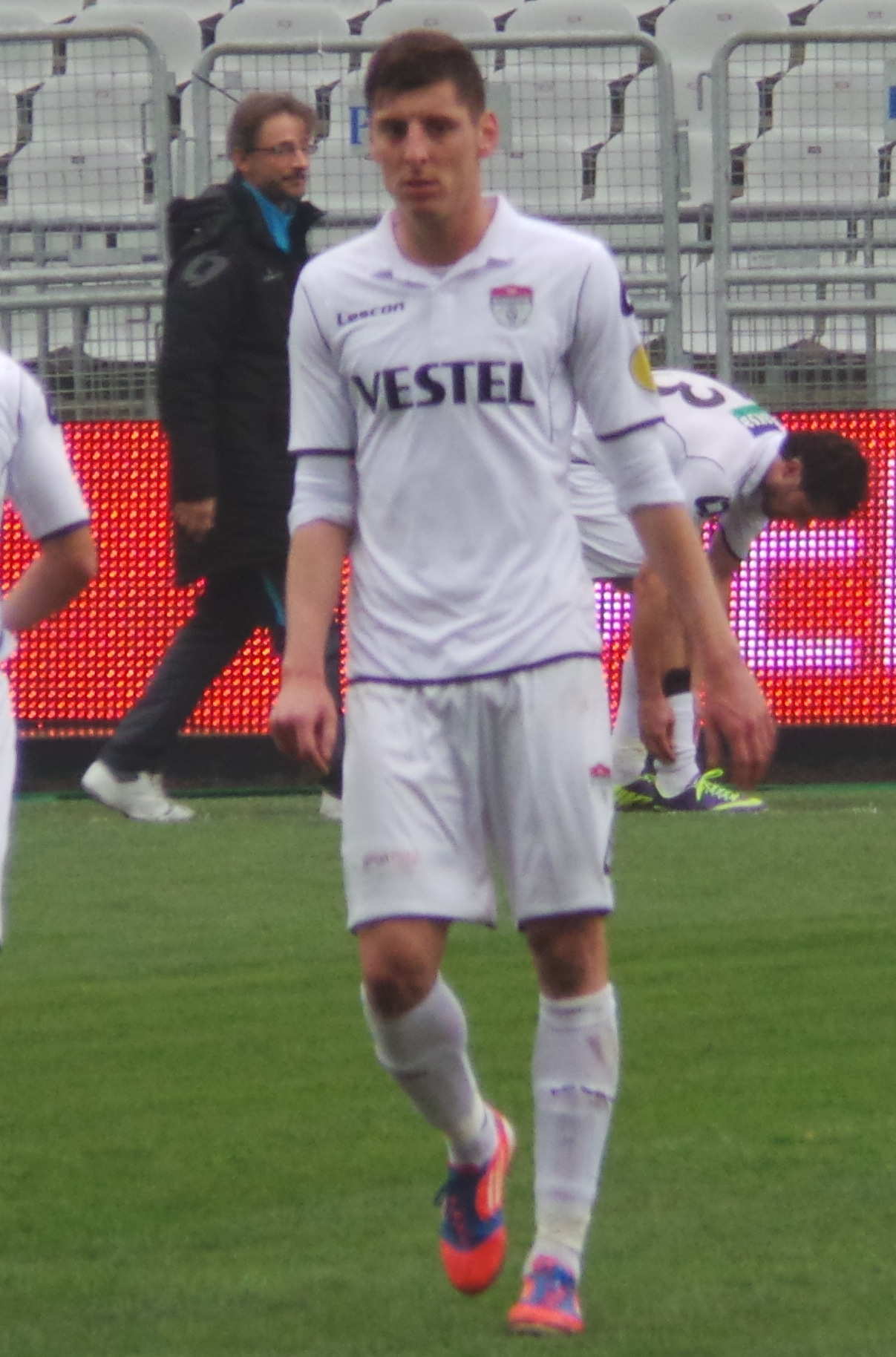
- Hikmet Balioğlu (2014)

Personal information
- Full name: Hikmet Balioğlu
- Date of birth: 4 August 1990 (age 36)
- Place of birth: Manisa, Turkey
- Position: Centre-back

Team information
- Current team: BB Bodrumspor
- Number: 94

Youth career
- 2003–2008: Manisaspor

Senior career*
Years	Team	Apps	(Gls)
2008–2014	Manisaspor	66	(0)
2009–2010	→ Menemen Bld. (loan)	25	(0)
2010–2011	→ Altınordu (loan)	28	(4)
2014–2016	Gençlerbirliği	9	(0)
2016	→ Şanlıurfaspor (loan)	2	(0)
2017	Menemen Bld.	17	(3)
2017–2018	Manisaspor	18	(0)
2018–2019	Utaş Uşakspor	28	(2)
2019	Sarıyer	10	(0)
2020–	BB Bodrumspor	3	(0)

International career
2009	Turkey U19	1	(0)
2012–2013	Turkey A2	5	(0)
- * Club domestic league appearances and goals as of 11:25, 7 July 2020 (UTC)

Hikmet Balioğlu (born 4 August 1990) is a Turkish footballer who plays as a centre-back for BB Bodrumspor. He made his Süper Lig debut on 10 May 2008 against Beşiktaş.
