= Terence Makengo =

French footballer (born 1992)

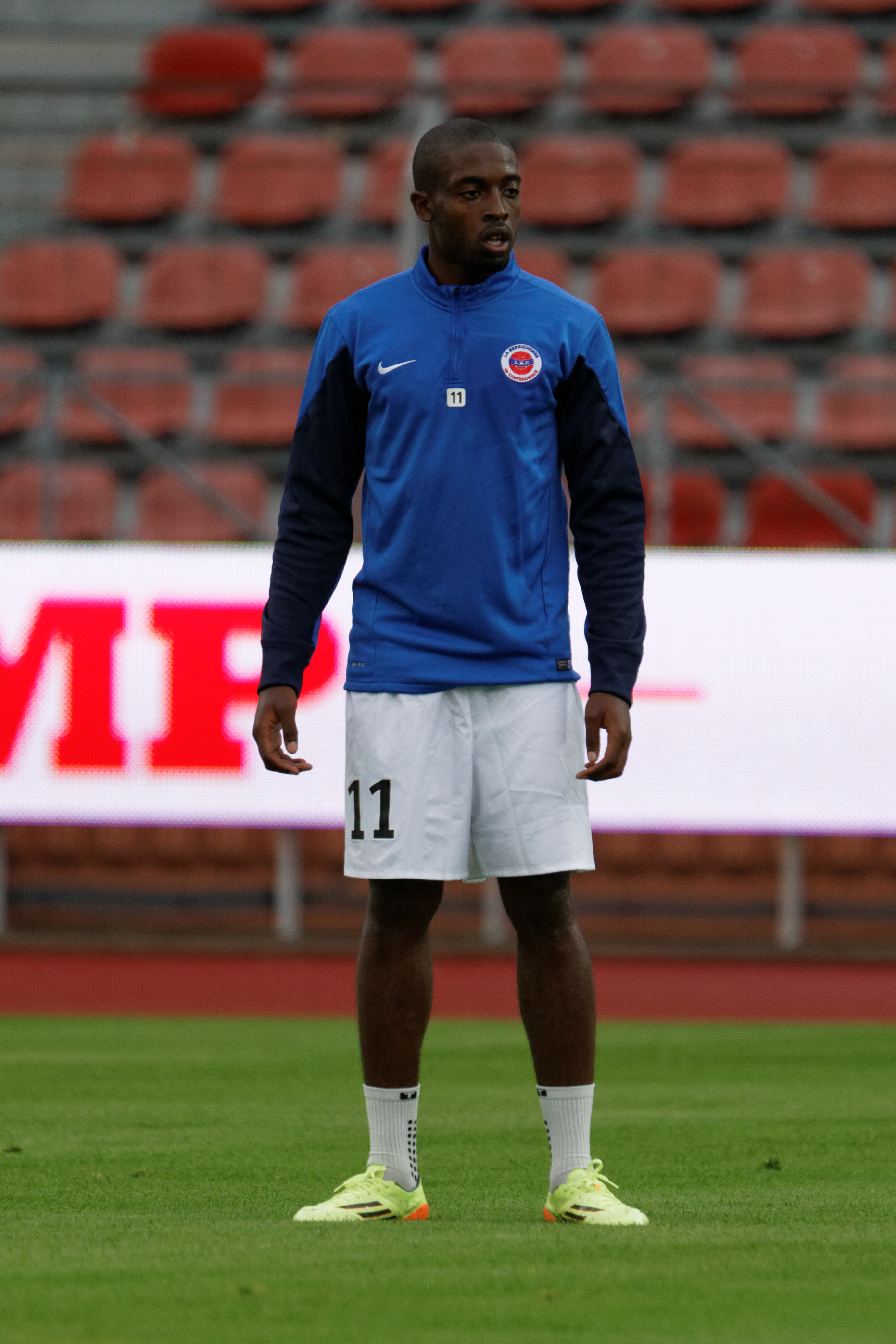
- Makengo with Châteauroux in 2014

Personal information
- Full name: Terence Pierre Makengo
- Date of birth: 22 June 1992 (age 34)
- Place of birth: Boulogne-sur-Mer, France
- Height: 1.84 m (6 ft 0 in)
- Position: Forward

Youth career
- 1998–2000: Dammartin
- 2000–2002: Emerainville
- 2002–2006: Torcy
- 2006–2007: Créteil
- 2005–2008: INF Clairefontaine
- 2008–2010: Monaco

Senior career*
| Years | Team | Apps | (Gls) |
| 2010–2013 | Monaco | 12 | (0) |
| 2012–2013 | → Auxerre (loan) | 18 | (1) |
| 2013–2016 | Châteauroux | 40 | (6) |
| 2017 | Zagłębie Sosnowiec | 0 | (0) |
| 2018–2019 | Les Herbiers | 16 | (3) |
| 2019 | Villefranche B | | |
| 2020 | Moulins Yzeure | 5 | (2) |
| 2020–2021 | Villefranche | 3 | (0) |
| 2021–2022 | Delémont | 20 | (7) |

International career
| 2008–2009 | France U17 | 9 | (1) |
| 2012 | France U20 | 5 | (2) |
- * Club domestic league appearances and goals as of 21:22, 13 February 2023 (UTC)

Terence Pierre "Tété" Makengo (born 22 June 1992) is a French professional footballer who plays as a forward. He is the son of former professional football player Sabhou Makengo.

== Early life ==
Makengo was born in Boulogne-sur-Mer, France, to Zairean parents. He is the son of Sabhou Makengo, an international Zairean footballer who was playing as a playmaker at US Boulogne. He acquired French nationality on 28 August 2000, through the collective effect of his mother's naturalization.

== Career ==
Makengo plays as a striker and is a former graduate of the INF Clairefontaine academy. Makengo is also a French youth international having represented France at under-17 level. On 3 November 2008, at the age of 16, he signed his first professional contract agreeing to a three-year deal with Monaco until 1 July 2011. The agreement made him the youngest player in the club's history to sign a professional contract.

On 10 November 2010, almost two years after signing his professional contract, Makengo made his professional debut in a Coupe de la Ligue match against Marseille appearing as a substitute in a 2–1 defeat. Makengo's development at Monaco has been traced by several clubs, notably Italian club Internazionale and English club Chelsea.

On 27 June 2011, Makengo signed a new professional contract agreeing to a three-year deal with Monaco. In July 2012, he joined Ligue 2 side AJ Auxerre on a loan deal.

In September 2013, Makengo left Monaco despite still having a year remaining on his contract, signing a three-year deal with Châteauroux. After two years as a regular in Ligue 2, he didn't make any appearances in the 2015–16 season, and left the club at the conclusion of his contract. In late 2016, he signed for Polish I liga side Zagłębie Sosnowiec on an 18-month deal. He left without making an appearance due to tearing an ACL tendon shortly after joining the club.

Makengo returned to France in July 2018, signing for Les Herbiers VF. On leaving Les Herbiers in the summer of 2019, he signed for Villefranche, but only played with their B team in Régional 2 (7th tier), and in January 2020 he signed for Moulins Yzeure Foot. In June 2020 he returned to Villefranche.

== Career statistics ==
As of 22 June 2024

Appearances and goals by club, season and competition
| Club | Season | League | | | National cup (Note: Includes Coupe de France.) | | League cup (Note: Includes Coupe de la Ligue.) | | Total | |
| Club | Season | Division | Apps | Goals | Apps | Goals | Apps | Goals | Apps | Goals |
|---|---|---|---|---|---|---|---|---|---|---|
| Monaco | 2010–11 | Ligue 1 | 0 | 0 | 0 | 0 | 1 | 0 | 1 | 0 |
| Monaco | 2011–12 | Ligue 2 | 12 | 0 | 2 | 0 | 0 | 0 | 14 | 0 |
| Monaco | Total | | 12 | 0 | 2 | 0 | 1 | 0 | 15 | 0 |
| Monaco B | 2010–11 | CFA | 22 | 5 | — | | — | | 22 | 5 |
| Monaco B | 2011–12 | CFA | 17 | 8 | — | | — | | 17 | 8 |
| Monaco B | Total | | 39 | 13 | 0 | 0 | 0 | 0 | 39 | 13 |
| Auxerre (loan) | 2012–13 | Ligue 2 | 18 | 1 | 1 | 0 | 2 | 1 | 21 | 2 |
| Châteauroux | 2013–14 | Ligue 2 | 20 | 2 | 1 | 0 | 0 | 0 | 21 | 2 |
| Châteauroux | 2014–15 | Ligue 2 | 20 | 4 | 2 | 1 | 0 | 0 | 22 | 5 |
| Châteauroux | 2015–16 | National | 0 | 0 | 0 | 0 | 0 | 0 | 0 | 0 |
| Châteauroux | Total | | 40 | 6 | 3 | 1 | 0 | 0 | 43 | 7 |
| Châteauroux B | 2013–14 | CFA 2 | 3 | 1 | — | | — | | 3 | 1 |
| Châteauroux B | 2014–15 | CFA 2 | 3 | 1 | — | | — | | 3 | 1 |
| Châteauroux B | 2015–16 | CFA 2 | 3 | 0 | — | | — | | 3 | 0 |
| Châteauroux B | Total | | 9 | 2 | 0 | 0 | 0 | 0 | 9 | 2 |
| Zagłębie Sosnowiec | 2016–17 | I liga | 0 | 0 | 0 | 0 | — | | 0 | 0 |
| Zagłębie Sosnowiec | 2017–18 | I liga | 0 | 0 | 0 | 0 | — | | 0 | 0 |
| Zagłębie Sosnowiec | Total | | 0 | 0 | 0 | 0 | 0 | 0 | 0 | 0 |
| Les Herbiers | 2018–19 | National 2 | 16 | 3 | 2 | 0 | — | | 18 | 3 |
| Les Herbiers | 2019–20 | National 2 | 0 | 0 | 0 | 0 | — | | 0 | 0 |
| Les Herbiers | Total | | 16 | 3 | 2 | 0 | 0 | 0 | 18 | 3 |
| Les Herbiers B | 2018–19 | National 3 | 3 | 1 | — | | — | | 3 | 1 |
| Les Herbiers B | 2019–20 | National 3 | 0 | 0 | — | | — | | 0 | 0 |
| Les Herbiers B | Total | | 3 | 1 | 0 | 0 | 0 | 0 | 3 | 1 |
| Moulins Yzeure | 2019–20 | National 2 | 5 | 2 | 0 | 0 | — | | 5 | 2 |
| Villefranche | 2020–21 | National | 3 | 0 | 0 | 0 | — | | 3 | 0 |
| Delémont | 2021–22 | Swiss 1. Liga | 18 | 7 | 1 | 0 | — | | 19 | 7 |
| Delémont | 2022–23 | Swiss 1. Liga | 2 | 0 | 1 | 0 | — | | 3 | 0 |
| Delémont | Total | | 20 | 7 | 2 | 0 | 0 | 0 | 22 | 7 |
| Career total | | | 165 | 35 | 10 | 1 | 3 | 1 | 178 | 37 |
