= Gökhan Keskin =

Turkish footballer

Personal information
- Date of birth: 31 March 1966 (age 60)
- Place of birth: Istanbul, Turkey
- Height: 1.92 m (6 ft 3 1/2 in)
- Position: Defender

Youth career
- Dikilitaşspor
- Beşiktaş

Senior career*
Years	Team	Apps	(Gls)
1984–1996	Beşiktaş	336	(14)
1996–2001	İstanbulspor	79	(1)

International career
1988–1995	Turkey	41	(0)
- * Club domestic league appearances and goals

Gökhan Keskin (born 31 March 1966 in Istanbul) is a retired Turkish professional footballer. He played for Beşiktaş and İstanbulspor.

== Club career ==
Keskin spent seventeen seasons in the Süper Lig with Beşiktaş and İstanbulspor

== International career ==
Keskin made 41 appearances for the full Turkey national football team.

== Individual ==
- Beşiktaş J.K. Squads of Century (Golden Team)
