= Kazuki Ōiwa =

Japanese footballer

Kazuki Ōiwa 大岩 一貴
Personal information
- Full name: Kazuki Ōiwa
- Date of birth: 17 August 1989 (age 37)
- Place of birth: Nagoya, Japan
- Height: 1.83 m (6 ft 0 in)
- Position: Centre back

Team information
- Current team: Renofa Yamaguchi
- Number: 3

Youth career
- 1996–1999: Atsuta SSS
- 2000–2004: Nagoya FC
- 2005–2007: Chukyo University Chukyo High School

College career
| Years | Team | Apps | (Gls) |
| 2008–2011 | Chuo University | | |

Senior career*
| Years | Team | Apps | (Gls) |
| 2012–2015 | JEF United Chiba | 132 | (6) |
| 2016–2019 | Vegalta Sendai | 117 | (7) |
| 2020–2025 | Shonan Bellmare | 120 | (6) |
| 2026– | Renofa Yamaguchi | 21 | (2) |
Medal record
Vegalta Sendai
| Runner-up | Emperor's Cup | 2018 |
- * Club domestic league appearances and goals as of 21 August 2026

Kazuki Ōiwa (大岩 一貴, Ōiwa Kazuki; born 17 August 1989) is a Japanese football player for Renofa Yamaguchi.

== Career statistics ==
=== Club ===
Updated to 7 August 2022.

| Club | Season | League | | | Cup^{1} | | League Cup^{2} | | Total | |
| Club | Season | Division | Apps | Goals | Apps | Goals | Apps | Goals | Apps | Goals |
|---|---|---|---|---|---|---|---|---|---|---|
| JEF United Chiba | 2012 | J2 League | 33 | 2 | 3 | 0 | – | | 36 | 2 |
| JEF United Chiba | 2013 | J2 League | 26 | 1 | 0 | 0 | – | | 26 | 1 |
| JEF United Chiba | 2014 | J2 League | 38 | 1 | 5 | 0 | – | | 43 | 1 |
| JEF United Chiba | 2015 | J2 League | 35 | 2 | 3 | 0 | – | | 38 | 2 |
| Vegalta Sendai | 2016 | J1 League | 33 | 1 | 1 | 0 | 5 | 0 | 39 | 1 |
| Vegalta Sendai | 2017 | J1 League | 34 | 3 | 1 | 0 | 10 | 0 | 45 | 3 |
| Vegalta Sendai | 2018 | J1 League | 33 | 2 | 6 | 0 | 4 | 0 | 43 | 2 |
| Vegalta Sendai | 2019 | J1 League | 17 | 1 | 1 | 0 | 8 | 0 | 26 | 1 |
| Shonan Bellmare | 2020 | J1 League | 17 | 2 | – | | 3 | 0 | 20 | 2 |
| Shonan Bellmare | 2021 | J1 League | 25 | 1 | 3 | 0 | 7 | 0 | 35 | 1 |
| Shonan Bellmare | 2022 | J1 League | 18 | 1 | 1 | 0 | 7 | 0 | 26 | 1 |
| Total | | | 309 | 17 | 24 | 0 | 44 | 0 | 377 | 17 |

^{1}Includes Emperor's Cup.

^{2}Includes J. League Cup.
