= Kemal Tokak =

Turkish professional footballer (born 1989)

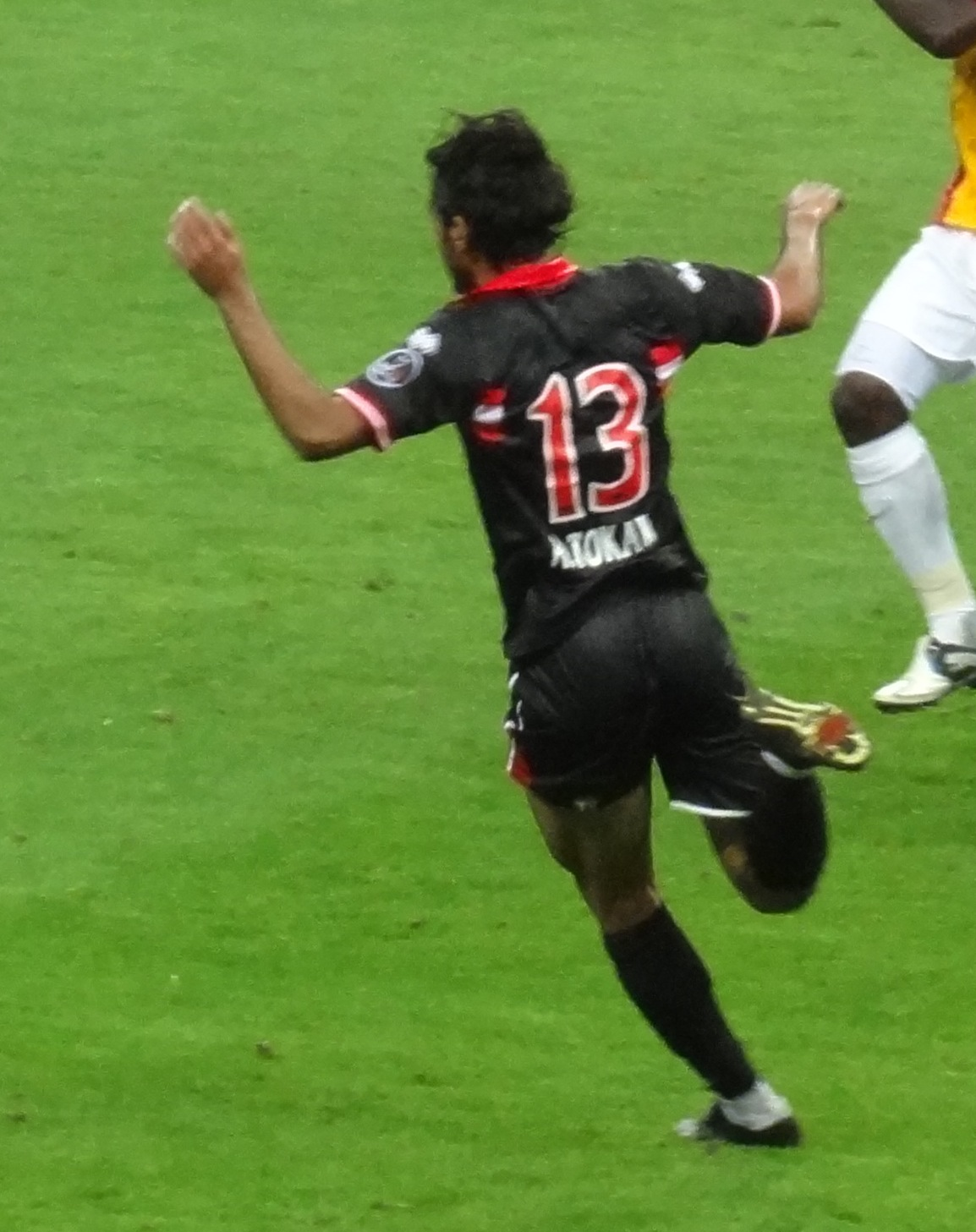

Personal information
- Date of birth: 25 April 1989 (age 37)
- Place of birth: Yüreğir, Adana, Turkey
- Height: 1.84 m (6 ft 1/2 in)
- Position: Centre back

Youth career
- 2001–2004: Adanaspor

Senior career*
Years	Team	Apps	(Gls)
2004–2010	Dardanelspor	0	(0)
2008–2009	→ Mustafakemalpaşa Spor (loan)	15	(0)
2009–2010	→ Orhangazispor (loan)	30	(2)
2010–2012	Samsunspor	53	(2)
2012	İstanbul BB	0	(0)
2012–2014	Gaziantepspor	29	(0)
2014–2015	Şanlıurfaspor	0	(0)
2015–2016	Elazığspor	7	(0)
2016–2017	Boluspor	10	(1)
2017	Erzurum BB	7	(1)
2017–2018	Sarıyer	15	(1)
2018–2019	Darıca Gençlerbirliği	11	(3)
2019	Kastamonuspor 1966	13	(0)
2019–2020	Tuzlaspor	27	(3)
2020–2022	Eyüpspor	27	(1)
2022–2023	İskenderunspor	17	(0)
2023–2024	Esenler Erokspor	6	(0)
2024–2025	Artvin Hopaspor	6	(0)

International career
2007	Turkey U18	2	(0)
2011–2012	Turkey A2	11	(0)
- * Club domestic league appearances and goals as of 3 November 2024

Kemal Tokak (born 25 April 1989) is a Turkish professional footballer.
