= Bülent Cevahir =

Turkish footballer

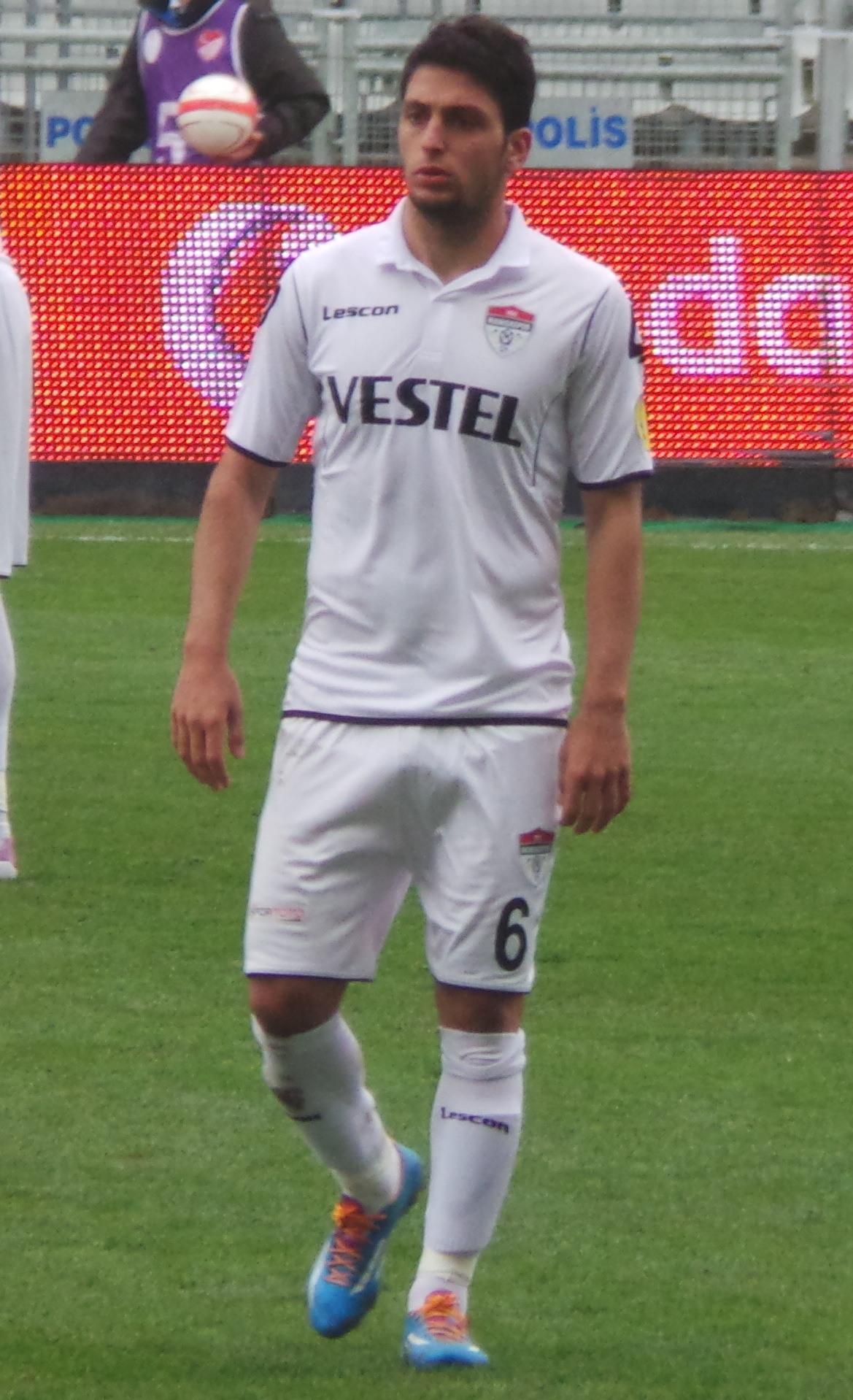

Personal information
- Full name: Bülent Cevahir
- Date of birth: 13 February 1992 (age 34)
- Place of birth: Selçuk, Turkey
- Height: 1.80 m (5 ft 11 in)
- Positions: Left back; midfielder; left wing

Team information
- Current team: Sakaryaspor
- Number: 61

Youth career
- 2002–2005: Selçuk Efesspor
- 2005–2010: Manisaspor

Senior career*
Years	Team	Apps	(Gls)
2010–2014	Manisaspor	72	(4)
2014–2019	Balıkesirspor	140	(0)
2019–2021	Yeni Malatyaspor	23	(0)
2019–2020	→ Fatih Karagümrük (loan)	24	(0)
2021–2022	Hatayspor	5	(0)
2022–2023	Boluspor	41	(0)
2023–	Sakaryaspor	3	(0)

International career^{‡}
2012–2013	Turkey U21	4	(0)
2012–	Turkey A2	3	(0)
- * Club domestic league appearances and goals as of 23 September 2023 ‡ National team caps and goals as of 27 February 2013

Bülent Cevahir (born 13 February 1992) is a Turkish footballer who plays as a defender for Sakaryaspor.

== Professional career ==
Cevahir made his Süper Lig debut on 30 January 2011 with Manisaspor jersey.
