= List of international sports matches held at Wembley Stadium =

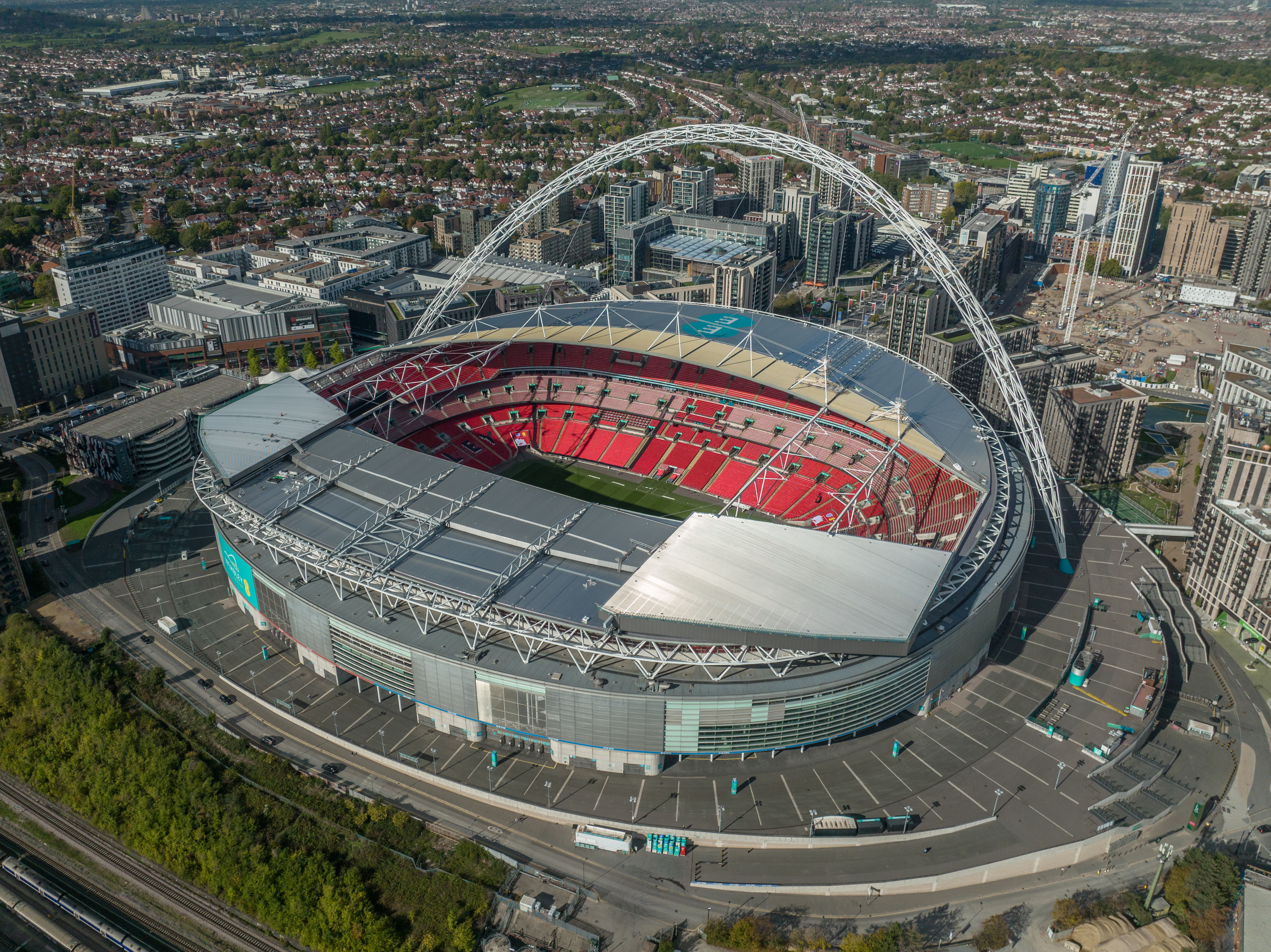

Wembley Stadium is the national football stadium of England. As such, it is the home stadium of the England national football team and hosts the majority of domestic football cup finals, as well as the domestic cup finals in rugby league. The stadium is also increasingly being used as the home stadium of the England women's national football team, in addition to being used for various other international matches.

== Association football ==
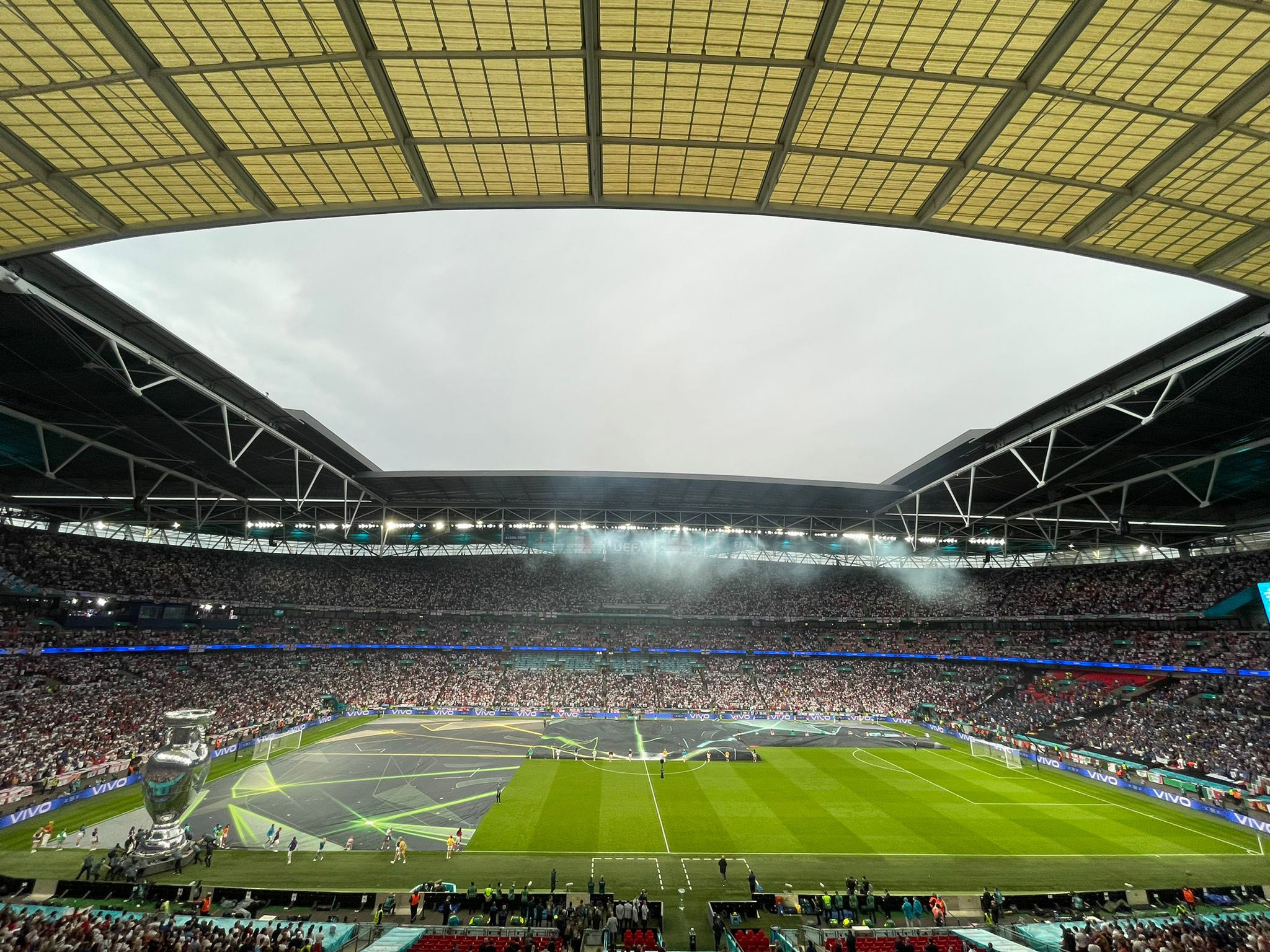

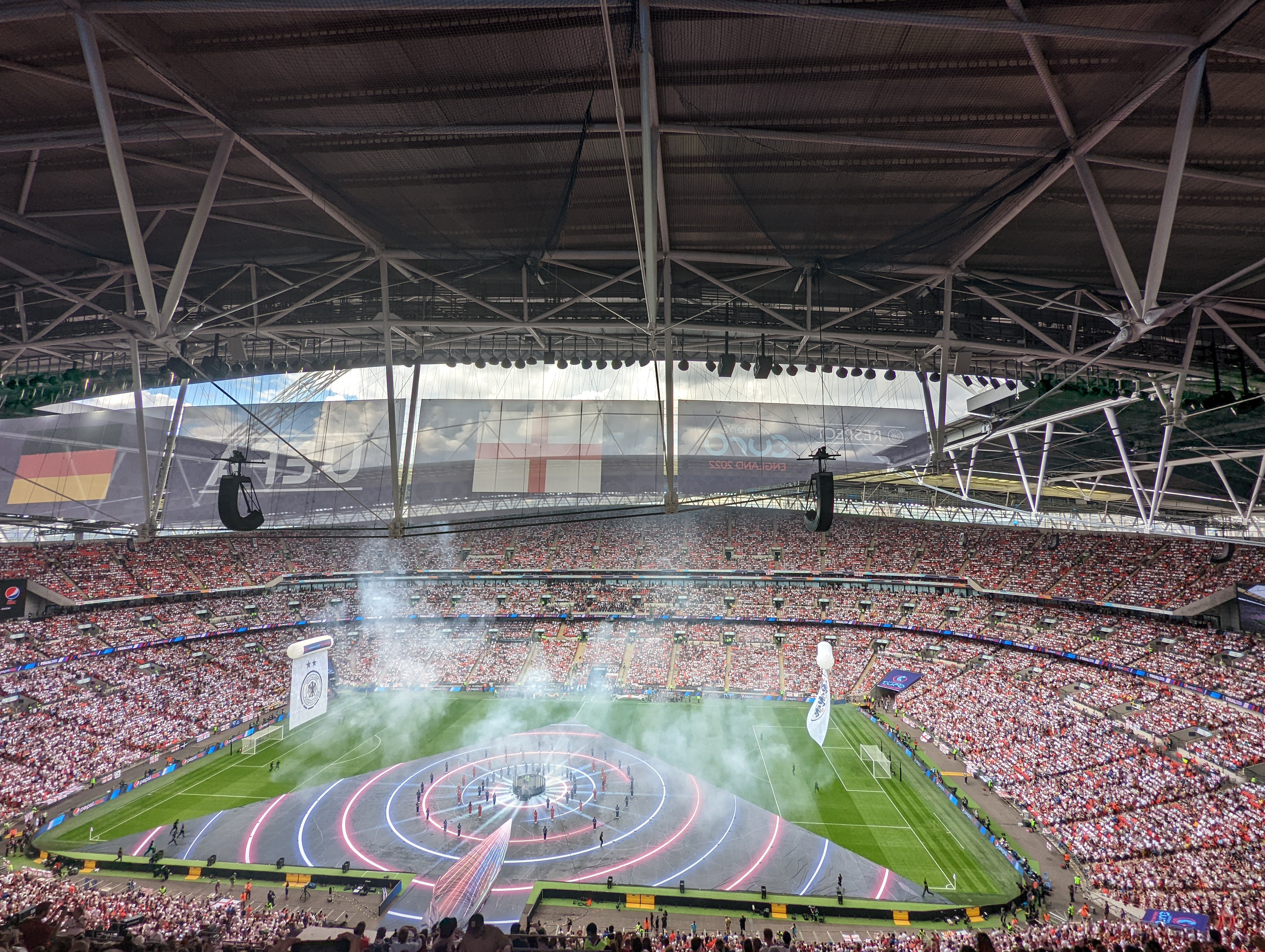
Closing ceremonies at the finals of the men's and women's European Championship in 2021 and 2022 respectively

Wembley Stadium has hosted games at the 2012 Summer Olympics Football Tournament (men's and women's), UEFA Euro 2020, and UEFA Women's Euro 2022, as well as the inaugural men's and women's Finalissimas. It has hosted the final of every tournament that has been played at the stadium.

Gold indicates a major tournament final

=== Men's ===
Date	Time	Team 1	Score	Team 2	Event	Attendance	Ref.
24 March 2007		England U-21	3–3	Italy U-21	Friendly	55,700	
1 June 2007	20:00	England	1–1	Brazil	Friendly	88,745	
22 August 2007	20:00	England	1–2	Germany	Friendly	86,133	
8 September 2007	17:00	England	3–0	Israel	UEFA Euro 2008 qualification	85,372	
12 September 2007	20:00	England	3–0	Russia	UEFA Euro 2008 qualification	86,106	
13 October 2007	15:00	England	3–0	Estonia	UEFA Euro 2008 qualification	86,665	
21 November 2007	20:00	England	2–3	Croatia	UEFA Euro 2008 qualification	88,091	
6 February 2008	20:00	England	2–1	Switzerland	Friendly	86,857	
28 May 2008	20:05	England	2–0	United States	Friendly	71,233	
20 August 2008	20:00	England	2–2	Czech Republic	Friendly	69,738	
11 October 2008	17:15	England	5–1	Kazakhstan	2010 FIFA World Cup qualification	89,107	
28 March 2009	17:15	England	4–0	Slovenia	Friendly	85,512	
1 April 2009	20:00	England	2–1	Ukraine	2010 FIFA World Cup qualification	87,548	
10 June 2009	20:15	England	6–0	Andorra	2010 FIFA World Cup qualification	57,897	
5 September 2009		England U-21	2–0	Portugal U-21	UEFA U-21 Euro 2009 qualification	20,000	
5 September 2009	17:30	England	3–0	Slovenia	Friendly	67,232	
9 September 2009	20:00	England	5–1	Croatia	2010 FIFA World Cup qualification	87,319	
20 October 2007	20:00	England	3–0	Belarus	2010 FIFA World Cup qualification	76,897	
3 March 2010	20:00	England	3–1	Egypt	Friendly	80,602	
28 May 2010	20:00	England	3–1	Mexico	Friendly	88,638	
11 August 2010	17:00	England	2–1	Hungary	Friendly	72,024	
3 September 2010	20:00	England	4–0	Bulgaria	UEFA Euro 2012 qualification	73,426	
12 October 2010	20:00	England	0–0	Monaco	UEFA Euro 2012 qualification	73,451	
17 November 2010	20:00	England	1–2	France	Friendly	85,495	
29 March 2011	19:45	England	1–1	Ghana	Friendly	80,102	
4 June 2011	16:45	England	2–2	Switzerland	UEFA Euro 2012 qualification	84,459	
6 September 2011	19:45	England	1–0	Wales	UEFA Euro 2012 qualification	77,128	
12 November 2011	17:15	England	1–0	Spain	Friendly	87,189	
15 November 2011	20:00	England	1–0	Sweden	Friendly	48,876	
29 February 2012	20:00	England	2–3	Netherlands	Friendly	76,283	
2 June 2012	17:15	England	1–0	Belgium	Friendly	85,091	
29 July 2012	17:00	Senegal	1–0	Uruguay	2012 Summer Olympics Group A	75,093	
29 July 2012	19:45	Great Britain	1–0	United Arab Emirates	2012 Summer Olympics Group A	85,137	
1 August 2012	17:00	South Korea	0–0	Gabon	2012 Summer Olympics Group B	76,927	
4 August 2012	14:30	Mexico	4–2 (a.e.t)	Senegal	2012 Summer Olympics Quarter-finals	81,855	
7 August 2012	17:00	Mexico	3–1	Japan	2012 Summer Olympics Semi-finals	82,372	
11 August 2012	15:00	Mexico	2–1	Brazil	2012 Summer Olympics Final	86,162	
11 September 2012	20:00	England	1–1	Ukraine	2014 FIFA World Cup qualification	68,102	
12 October 2012	20:00	England	5–0	San Marino	2014 FIFA World Cup qualification	86,645	
6 February 2013	19:30	England	2–1	Brazil	Friendly	87,453	
29 May 2013	20:00	England	1–1	Republic of Ireland	Friendly	80,126	
14 August 2013	20:00	England	3–2	Scotland	Friendly	80,485	
6 September 2013	20:00	England	4–0	Moldova	2014 FIFA World Cup qualification	61,607	
11 October 2013	20:00	England	4–1	Monaco	2014 FIFA World Cup qualification	83,807	
15 October 2013	20:00	England	2–0	Poland	2014 FIFA World Cup qualification	85,186	
15 November 2013	20:00	England	0–2	Chile	Friendly	62,963	
19 November 2013	20:00	England	0–1	Germany	Friendly	85,934	
5 March 2014	20:00	England	1–0	Denmark	Friendly	68,573	
30 May 2014	20:00	England	3–0	Peru	Friendly	83,578	
3 September 2014	20:00	England	1–0	Norway	Friendly	40,181	
9 October 2014	19:45	England	5–0	San Marino	UEFA Euro 2016 qualification	55,990	
15 November 2014	17:00	England	3–1	Slovenia	UEFA Euro 2016 qualification	82,305	
27 March 2015	19:45	England	4–0	Lithuania	UEFA Euro 2016 qualification	83,671	
8 September 2015	19:45	England	2–0	Switzerland	UEFA Euro 2016 qualification	75,751	
9 October 2015	19:45	England	2–0	Estonia	UEFA Euro 2016 qualification	75,427	
17 November 2015	20:00	England	2–0	France	Friendly	71,223	
29 March 2016	20:00	England	1–2	Netherlands	Friendly	82,831	
2 June 2016	19:45	England	1–0	Portugal	Friendly	82,503	
8 October 2016	17:00	England	2–0	Malta	2018 FIFA World Cup qualification	81,781	
11 November 2016	19:45	England	3–0	Scotland	2018 FIFA World Cup qualification	87,258	
15 November 2016	19:45	England	2–2	Spain	Friendly	83,716	
26 March 2017	17:00	England	2–0	Lithuania	2018 FIFA World Cup qualification	77,690	
4 September 2017	19:45	England	2–1	Slovakia	2018 FIFA World Cup qualification	67,823	
5 October 2017	19:45	England	1–0	Slovenia	2018 FIFA World Cup qualification	61,598	
10 November 2017	20:00	England	0–0	Brazil	Friendly	81,382	
14 November 2017	20:00	England	0–0	Germany	Friendly	84,595	
27 March 2018	20:00	England	1–1	Italy	Friendly	82,598	
2 June 2018	20:00	England	2–1	Nigeria	Friendly	70,025	
8 September 2018	19:45	England	1–2	Spain	2018–19 UEFA Nations League	81,392	
15 November 2018	20:00	England	3–0	United States	Friendly (Wayne Rooney Testimonial)	68,155	
18 November 2018	14:00	England	2–1	Croatia	2018–19 UEFA Nations League	78,221	
22 March 2019	19:45	England	5–0	Czech Republic	UEFA Euro 2020 qualification	82,575	
7 September 2019	17:00	England	4–0	Bulgaria	UEFA Euro 2020 qualification	82,605	
14 November 2019	19:45	England	7–0	Montenegro	UEFA Euro 2020 qualification	77,277	
8 October 2020	20:00	England	3–0	Wales	Friendly	0	
11 October 2020	17:00	England	2–1	Belgium	2020–21 UEFA Nations League	0	
14 October 2020	19:45	England	0–1	Denmark	2020–21 UEFA Nations League	0	
12 November 2020	20:00	England	3–0	Republic of Ireland	Friendly	0	
18 November 2020	19:45	England	4–0	Iceland	2020–21 UEFA Nations League	0	
25 March 2021	19:45	England	5–0	San Marino	2022 FIFA World Cup qualification	0	
31 March 2021	19:45	England	2–1	Poland	2022 FIFA World Cup qualification	0	
13 June 2021	14:00	England	1–0	Croatia	UEFA Euro 2020 Group D	18,497	
18 June 2021	20:00	England	0–0	Scotland	UEFA Euro 2020 Group D	20,306	
22 June 2021	20:00	Czech Republic	0–1	England	UEFA Euro 2020 Group D	19,104	
26 June 2021	20:00	Austria	1–2 (a.e.t)	Italy	UEFA Euro 2020 Round of 16	18,910	
29 June 2021	17:00	England	2–0	Germany	UEFA Euro 2020 Round of 16	41,973	
6 July 2021	20:00	Italy	1–1 (4–2 p)	Spain	UEFA Euro 2020 Semi-finals	57,811	
7 July 2021	20:00	England	2–1 (a.e.t)	Denmark	UEFA Euro 2020 Semi-finals	64,950	
11 July 2021	20:00	Italy	1–1 (3–2 p)	England	UEFA Euro 2020 Final	67,173	
5 September 2021	17:00	England	4–0	Andorra	2022 FIFA World Cup qualification	67,171	
12 October 2021	19:45	England	1–1	Hungary	2022 FIFA World Cup qualification	69,380	
12 November 2021	19:45	England	5–0	Albania	2022 FIFA World Cup qualification	80,366	
26 March 2022	17:30	England	2–1	Switzerland	Friendly	78,881	
29 March 2022	19:45	England	3–0	Ivory Coast	Friendly	73,405	
1 June 2022	19:45	Italy	0–3	Argentina	2022 Finalissima	87,112	
26 September 2022	17:00	England	3–3	Germany	2022–23 UEFA Nations League	78,949	
26 March 2023	17:00	England	2–0	Ukraine	UEFA Euro 2024 qualification	83,947	
13 October 2023	19:45	England	1–0	Australia	Friendly	81,116	
17 October 2023	19:45	England	3–1	Italy	UEFA Euro 2024 qualification	83,194	
17 November 2023	19:45	England	2–0	Malta	UEFA Euro 2024 qualification	81,388	
23 March 2024	19:00	England	0–1	Brazil	Friendly	83,664	
26 March 2024	19:45	England	2–2	Belgium	Friendly	80,733	
7 June 2024	19:45	England	0–1	Iceland	Friendly	81,410	
10 September 2024	19:45	England	2–0	Finland	2024–25 UEFA Nations League	70,221	
10 October 2024	19:45	England	1–2	Greece	2024–25 UEFA Nations League	79,012	
17 November 2024	17:00	England	5–0	Republic of Ireland	2024–25 UEFA Nations League	79,969	
21 March 2025	19:45	England	2–0	Albania	2026 FIFA World Cup qualification	82,378	
26 March 2025	19:45	England	3–0	Latvia	2026 FIFA World Cup qualification	79,572	
9 October 2025	19:45	England	3–0	Wales	Friendly	78,126	
13 November 2025	19:45	England	2–0	Serbia	2026 FIFA World Cup qualification	74,289	
27 March 2026	19:45	England	1–1	Uruguay	Friendly	80,581	
31 March 2026	19:45	England	0–1	Japan	Friendly	79,233	
26 September 2026	19:45	England	2–3	Spain	2026–27 UEFA Nations League	84,525	
6 October 2026	19:45	England	3–0	Czech Republic	2026–27 UEFA Nations League	78,864	
12 November 2026	19:45	England	–	Croatia	2026–27 UEFA Nations League		
11 June 2028	00:00	C1	–	C2	UEFA Euro 2028 Group C	TBD	
14 June 2028	00:00	B1	–	B3	UEFA Euro 2028 Group B	TBD	
16 June 2028	00:00	D1	–	D3	UEFA Euro 2028 Group D	TBD	
19 June 2028	00:00	B4	–	B1	UEFA Euro 2028 Group B	TBD	
30 June 2028	00:00	Winner Match 39	–	Winner Match 37	UEFA Euro 2028 Quarter-finals	TBD	
4 July 2028	00:00	Winner Match 45	–	Winner Match 46	UEFA Euro 2028 Semi-finals	TBD	
5 July 2028	00:00	Winner Match 47	–	Winner Match 48	UEFA Euro 2028 Semi-finals	TBD	
9 July 2028	17:00	Winner Match 49	–	Winner Match 50	UEFA Euro 2028 Final	TBD	

=== Women's ===
Date	Time	Team 1	Score	Team 2	Event	Attendance	Ref.
31 July 2012	19:45	Great Britain	1–0	Brazil	2012 Summer Olympics Group E	70,584	
6 August 2012	17:00	Japan	2–1	France	2012 Summer Olympics Semi-finals	61,482	
9 August 2012	19:45	United States	2–1	Japan	2012 Summer Olympics Final	80,203	
23 November 2014	17:30	England	0–3	Germany	Friendly	45,619	
9 November 2019	17:30	England	1–2	Germany	Friendly	77,768	
23 October 2021	20:00	England	2–1	Northern Ireland	2023 FIFA World Cup qualification	23,225	
31 July 2022	17:00	England	2–1 (a.e.t)	Germany	UEFA Euro 2022 Final	87,192	
7 October 2022	20:00	England	2–1	United States	Friendly	76,893	
6 April 2023	19:45	England	1–1 (4–2 p)	Brazil	2023 Finalissima	83,132	
1 December 2023	19:45	England	3–2	Netherlands	2023 Nations League	71,632	
5 April 2024	20:00	England	3–4	Sweden	UEFA Euro 2025 qualification	63,248	
25 October 2024	19:30	England	3–4	Germany	Friendly	47,967	
30 November 2024	17:20	England	0–0	United States	Friendly	78,346	
6 February 2025	20:00	England	1–0	Spain	2025 Nations League	46,550	
30 May 2025	19:45	England	6–0	Portugal	2025 Nations League	48,531	
29 November 2025	17:30	England	8–0	China	Friendly	74,611	
14 April 2026	19:00	England	1–0	Spain	2027 FIFA World Cup qualification	62,306	
5 December 2026	15:30	England	–	Ukraine	2027 FIFA World Cup qualification play-offs		

== Rugby league ==
Wembley Stadium hosted both semi finals of the 2013 Rugby League World Cup in addition to two games of the 2011 Four Nations. The stadium hosted the first Ashes match of the 2025 series.

Date	Team 1	Score	Team 2	Event	Attendance	Ref.
23 November 2011	Wales	0–36	New Zealand	2011 Four Nations Round 2 (Double Header)	42,344	
23 November 2011	England	20–36	Australia	2011 Four Nations Round 2 (Double Header)	42,344	
5 November 2013	New Zealand	20–18	England	2013 World Cup Semi Final (Double Header)	67,545	
5 November 2013	Australia	64–0	Fiji	2013 World Cup Semi Final (Double Header)	67,545	
25 October 2025	England	6–26	Australia	2025 Ashes Test 1	60,812	

== Rugby union ==
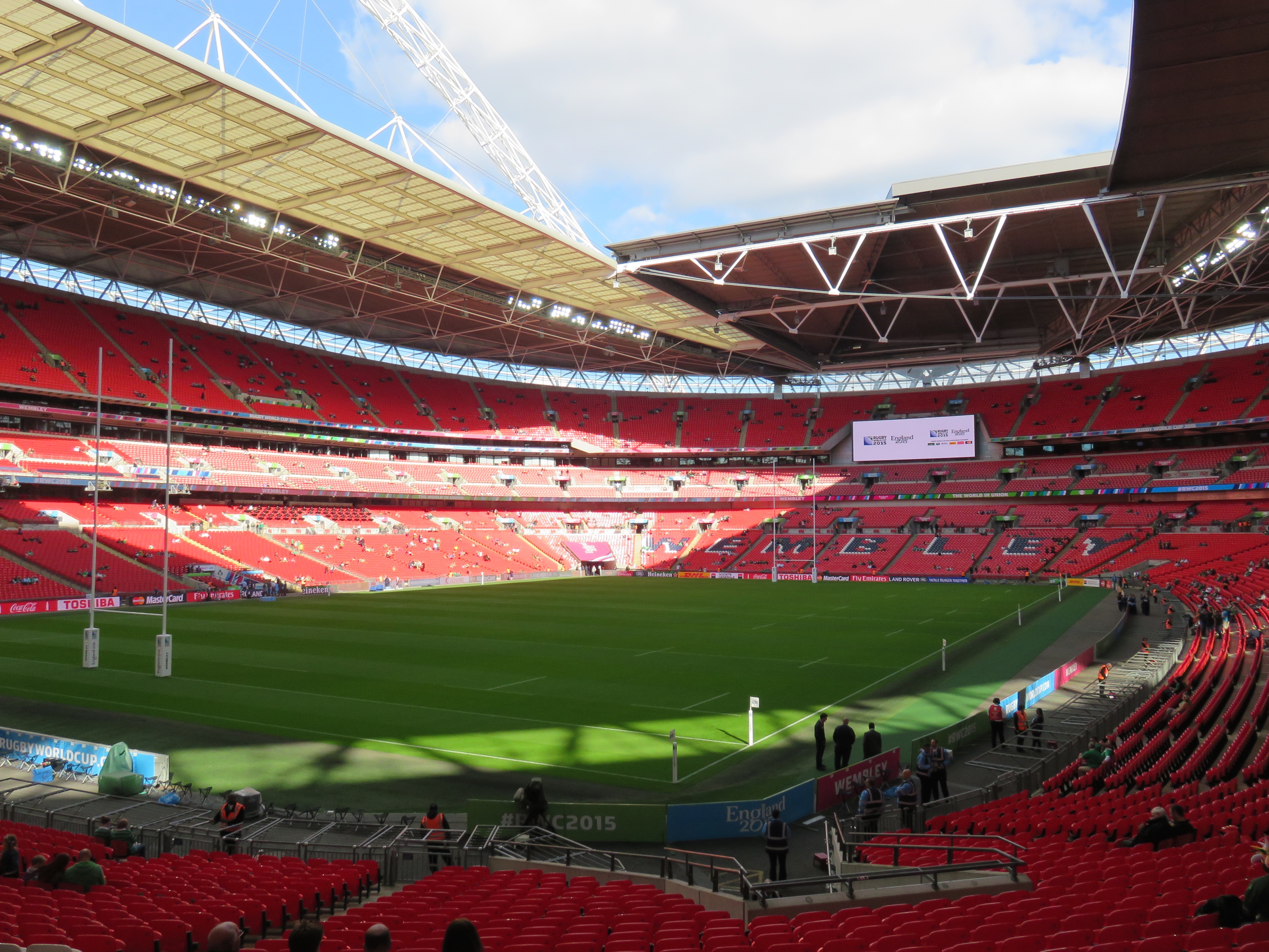
Wembley Stadium set up for the 2015 Rugby World Cup

Wembley Stadium hosted two matches of the 2015 Rugby World Cup.

Date	Team 1	Score	Team 2	Match	Attendance	Ref.
20 September 2015	New Zealand	26–16	Argentina	2015 Rugby World Cup Pool C	89,019	
27 September 2015	Ireland	44–10	Romania	2015 Rugby World Cup Pool D	89,267	
1 November 2025	South Africa	61–7	Japan	2025 Autumn Internationals	23,243	

== Club matches ==
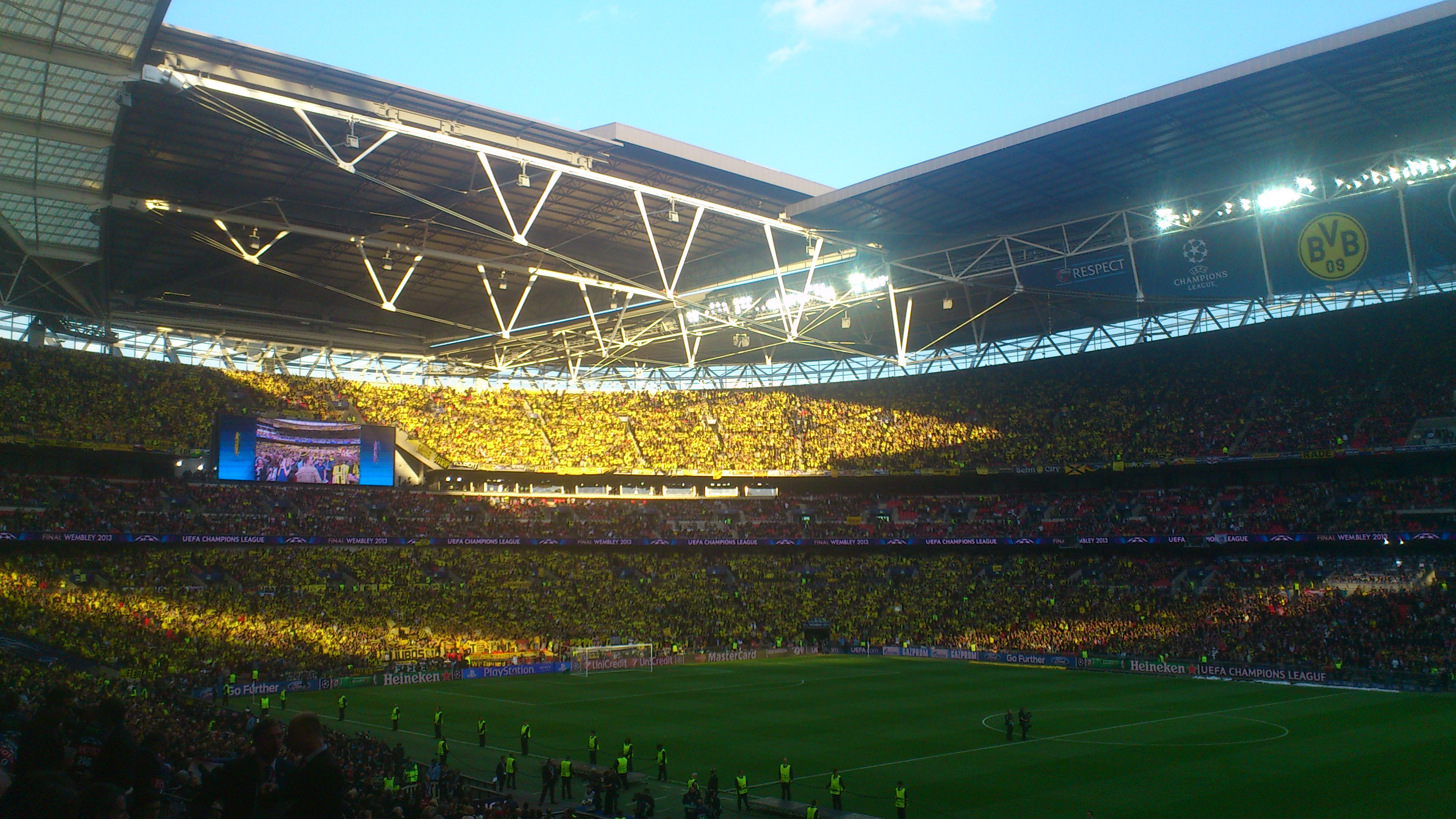
Borussia Dortmund's Yellow Wall at Wembley Stadium during the 2013 UEFA Champions League final

Wembley Stadium has hosted three UEFA Champions League finals. The stadium also hosted Tottenham Hotspur's European matches in the 2016–17, 2017–18, and 2018–19 seasons.

UEFA Champions League finals

Season	Time	Winners	Score	Runners-up	Attendance	Ref.
28 May 2011	19:45	(Spain) Barcelona	3–1	(England) Manchester United	87,695	
25 May 2013	19:45	(Germany) Bayern Munich	2–1	(Germany) Borussia Dortmund	86,298	
1 June 2024	20:00	(Spain) Real Madrid	2–0	(Germany) Borussia Dortmund	86,212	

National Football League

Since opening Wembley has hosted the majority of the United Kingdom's NFL International Series games.
