= UEFA Euro 2028 final =

UEFA Euro 2028 Final
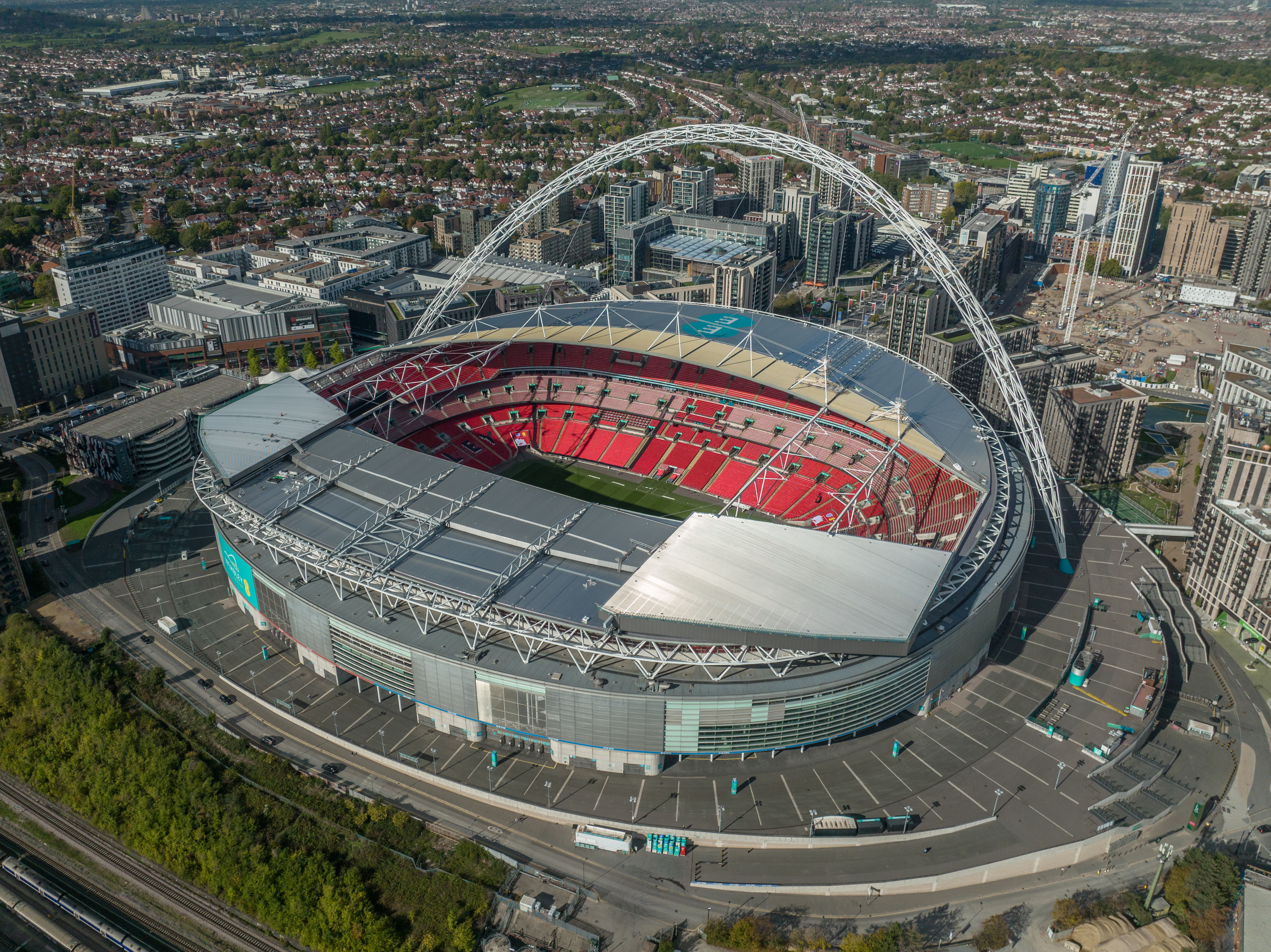
- The Wembley Stadium in London will host the final.
- Event: UEFA Euro 2028
- Date: 9 July 2028
- Venue: Wembley Stadium, London

The UEFA Euro 2028 Final is an upcoming football match to determine the winners of UEFA Euro 2028. The match will be the 18th final of the UEFA European Championship, a quadrennial tournament contested by the men's national teams of the member associations of UEFA to decide the champion of Europe. The match will be held at the Wembley Stadium in London, England, on 9 July 2028 and will be contested by the winners of the semi-finals.

== Venue ==
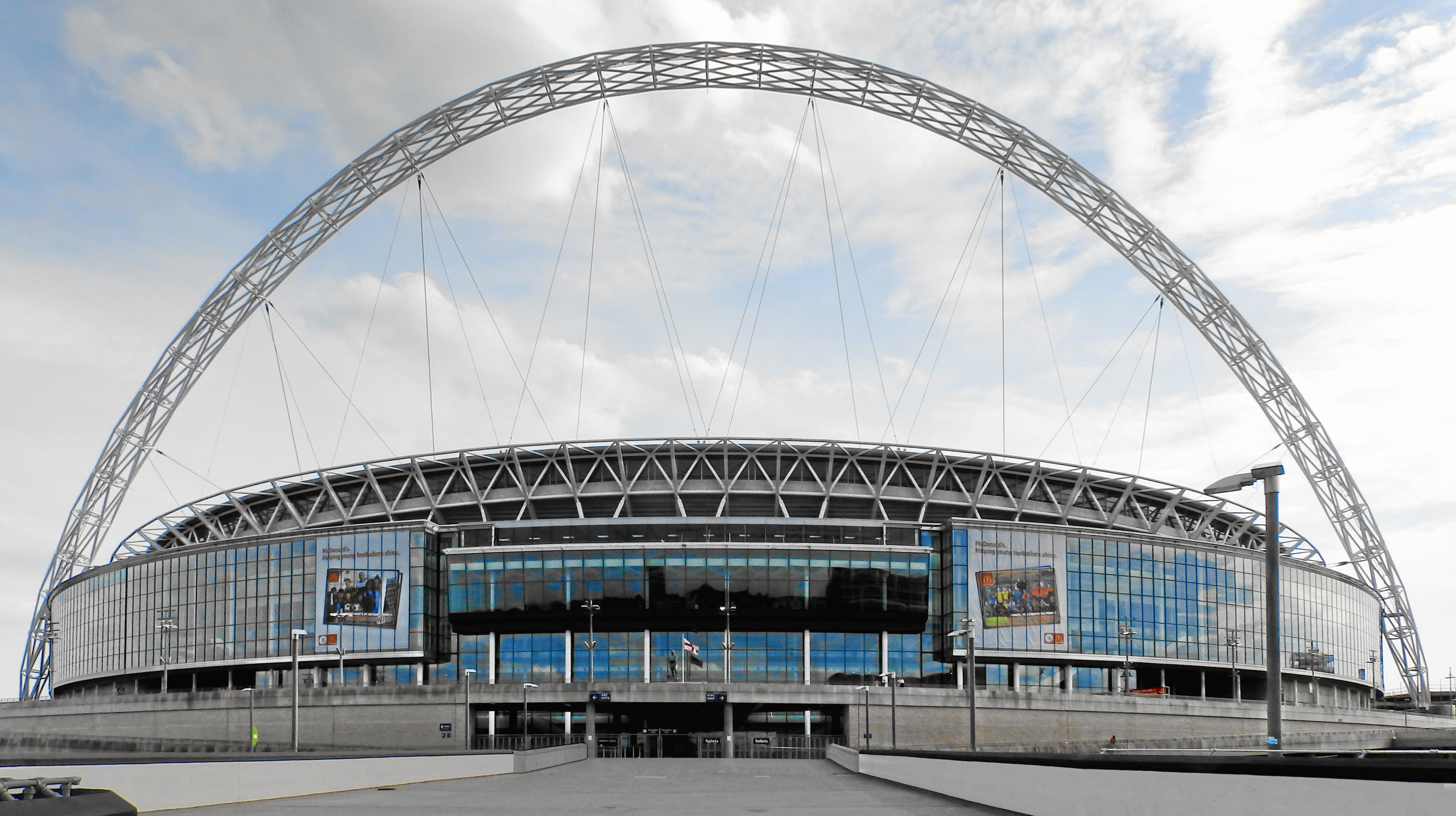
The entrance of the Wembley Stadium

The final will be held at the Wembley Stadium in London, England. On 10 October 2023, UEFA announced in Nyon, Switzerland, the 2028 and 2032 hosts of the tournament, with the former being held in the United Kingdom and Ireland, after the joint bid were unopposed for the 2028 candidature, since Russia's bid was considered ineligible and Turkey had withdrawn to focus on the 2032 edition. The Wembley Stadium was chosen as the final venue of the tournament by the UEFA Executive Committee in November 2025, where it was announced it would also host four group stage matches, a quarter-final match and both semi-final matches in the tournament.

Wembley Stadium opened in 2007 on the site of the original stadium, the demolition of which took place between 2002 and 2003. Owned by the Football Association (FA), it serves as England's national football stadium. The original stadium, formerly known as the Empire Stadium, opened in 1923 and hosted matches at the 1966 FIFA World Cup, including the final, which saw hosts England beat West Germany 4–2 after extra time, and at UEFA Euro 1996, including the final, in which Germany defeated the Czech Republic. Wembley also hosts the annual FA Cup Final. It also served as a venue for eight matches of the UEFA Euro 2020 (including both semi-finals and the final), the 2011, 2013 and the 2024 Champions League Finals and hosted the final of the UEFA Women's Euro 2022..

== Match ==
=== Details ===
9 July 2028
17:00

Winner Match 49	Match 51	Winner Match 50

Wembley Stadium, London

Match rules

- 90 minutes.
- 30 minutes of extra time if necessary.
- Penalty shoot-out if scores still level.
- Maximum of twelve named substitutes.
- Maximum of three substitutions, with a fourth allowed in extra time.
