= Football at the 2020 Summer Olympics – Men's tournament – Knockout stage =

Football at the Olympics

The knockout stage of the men's football tournament at the 2020 Summer Olympics was played from 31 July to 7 August 2021. The top two teams from each group in the group stage qualified for the knockout stage.

All times listed are Japan Standard Time (UTC+9).

== Format ==
In the knockout stage, if a match was level at the end of 90 minutes of normal playing time, extra time was played (two periods of 15 minutes each) and followed, if necessary, by a penalty shoot-out to determine the winner.

== Qualified teams ==
The top two placed teams from each of the four groups qualified for the knockout stage.

Group	Winners	Runners-up
A	Japan	Mexico
B	South Korea	New Zealand
C	Spain	Egypt
D	Brazil	Ivory Coast

== Bracket ==
Quarter-finals
31 July – Yokohama
South Korea	3
Mexico	6
31 July – Saitama
Brazil	1
Egypt	0
31 July – Kashima
Japan (p)	0 (4)
New Zealand	0 (2)
31 July – Rifu
Spain (a.e.t.)	5
Ivory Coast	2

Semi-finals
3 August – Kashima
Mexico	0 (1)
Brazil (p)	0 (4)
3 August – Saitama
Japan	0
Spain (a.e.t.)	1

Gold medal match
7 August – Yokohama
Brazil (a.e.t.)	2
Spain	1
Bronze medal match
6 August – Saitama
Mexico	3
Japan	1

== Quarter-finals ==
=== Spain vs Ivory Coast ===
31 July 2021
17:00

Spain	5–2 (a.e.t.)	Ivory Coast
Olmo 30'; Mir 90+3', 117', 120+1'; Oyarzabal 98' (pen.)	Report (TOCOG); Report (FIFA)	Bailly 10'; Gradel 90+1'

Miyagi Stadium, Rifu
Attendance: 5,526
Referee: Jesús Valenzuela (Venezuela)

Spain	Ivory Coast

GK	1	Unai Simón
RB	2	Óscar Mingueza		(substituted off) 10'
CB	12	Eric García	(yellow card) 77'
CB	4	Pau Torres
LB	20	Juan Miranda		(substituted off) 106'
DM	6	Martín Zubimendi		(substituted off) 106'
CM	8	Mikel Merino (c)		(substituted off) 90+2'
CM	16	Pedri		(substituted off) 102'
AM	19	Dani Olmo	(yellow card) 70'
CF	7	Marco Asensio		(substituted off) 67'
CF	11	Mikel Oyarzabal
Substitutions:
DF	5	Jesús Vallejo		(substituted on) 10'
FW	21	Bryan Gil		(substituted on) 67'
FW	9	Rafa Mir		(substituted on) 90+2'
MF	14	Carlos Soler	(yellow card) 114'	(substituted on) 102'
MF	15	Jon Moncayola		(substituted on) 106'
DF	3	Marc Cucurella		(substituted on) 106'
Head coach:
Luis de la Fuente

GK	16	Ira Eliezer Tapé
RB	6	Wilfried Singo
CB	3	Eric Bailly
CB	4	Kouadio-Yves Dabila	(yellow card) 74'
LB	5	Ismaël Diallo
RM	18	Cheick Timité		(substituted off) 62'
CM	12	Eboue Kouassi		(substituted off) 114'
CM	8	Franck Kessié
LM	15	Max Gradel (c)
CF	11	Christian Kouamé		(substituted off) 90'
CF	9	Youssouf Dao
Substitutions:
FW	10	Amad Diallo		(substituted on) 62'
FW	13	Kader Keïta		(substituted on) 90'
DF	19	Koffi Kouao		(substituted on) 114'
Head coach:
Soualiho Haïdara

Assistant referees:
Tulio Moreno (Venezuela)
Lubin Torrealba (Venezuela)
Fourth official:
Leodán González (Uruguay)
Video assistant referee:
Nicolás Gallo (Colombia)
Assistant video assistant referee:
Erick Miranda (Mexico)

=== Japan vs New Zealand ===
31 July 2021
18:00

Japan	0–0 (a.e.t.)	New Zealand
	Report (TOCOG); Report (FIFA)
Penalties
Ueda (penalty scored); Itakura (penalty scored); Nakayama (penalty scored); Yoshida (penalty scored)	4–2	(penalty scored) Wood; (penalty missed) Cacace; (penalty missed) Lewis; (penalty scored) McCowatt

Kashima Stadium, Kashima
Referee: Ismail Elfath (United States)

Japan	New Zealand

GK	12	Kosei Tani
RB	15	Daiki Hashioka
CB	14	Takehiro Tomiyasu	(yellow card) 89'
CB	5	Maya Yoshida (c)
LB	16	Yuki Soma		(substituted off) 69'
DM	6	Wataru Endo
CM	17	Ao Tanaka		(substituted off) 90'
CM	13	Reo Hatate		(substituted off) 90'
RW	10	Ritsu Dōan		(substituted off) 105'
LW	7	Takefusa Kubo
CF	19	Daichi Hayashi		(substituted off) 69'
Substitutions:
FW	18	Ayase Ueda		(substituted on) 69'
DF	3	Yuta Nakayama		(substituted on) 69'
FW	11	Kaoru Mitoma		(substituted on) 90'
DF	4	Ko Itakura		(substituted on) 90'
MF	8	Koji Miyoshi	(yellow card) 114'	(substituted on) 105'
Head coach:
Hajime Moriyasu

GK	1	Michael Woud
CB	16	Gianni Stensness	(yellow card) 55'
CB	2	Winston Reid (c)		(substituted off) 51'
CB	4	Nando Pijnaker
DM	8	Joe Bell	(yellow card) 19'
RM	17	Callan Elliot		(substituted off) 79'
CM	19	Matthew Garbett	(yellow card) 64'	(substituted off) 79'
CM	6	Clayton Lewis
LM	3	Liberato Cacace	(yellow card) 71'
SS	18	Ben Waine		(substituted off) 85'
CF	9	Chris Wood
Substitutions:
FW	12	Callum McCowatt		(substituted on) 51'
DF	15	Dane Ingham		(substituted on) 79'
FW	7	Elijah Just		(substituted on) 79'
FW	11	Joe Champness		(substituted on) 85'
Head coach:
Danny Hay

Assistant referees:
Corey Parker (United States)
Kyle Atkins (United States)
Fourth official:
Victor Gomes (South Africa)
Video assistant referee:
Chris Penso (United States)
Assistant video assistant referee:
Tiago Martins (Portugal)

=== Brazil vs Egypt ===
31 July 2021
19:00

Brazil	1–0	Egypt
Cunha 37'	Report (TOCOG); Report (FIFA)

Saitama Stadium 2002, Saitama
Referee: Chris Beath (Australia)

Brazil	Egypt

GK	1	Aderbar Santos
RB	13	Dani Alves (c)
CB	15	Nino
CB	3	Diego Carlos
LB	6	Guilherme Arana
CM	8	Bruno Guimarães
CM	5	Douglas Luiz
RW	11	Antony	(yellow card) 32'	(substituted off) 65'
AM	20	Claudinho		(substituted off) 65'
LW	9	Matheus Cunha		(substituted off) 54'
CF	10	Richarlison		(substituted off) 90+2'
Substitutions:
FW	7	Paulinho		(substituted on) 54'
FW	17	Malcom		(substituted on) 65'
MF	19	Reinier		(substituted on) 65'
MF	2	Gabriel Menino		(substituted on) 90+2'
Head coach:
André Jardine

GK	1	Mohamed El Shenawy
CB	4	Osama Galal
CB	6	Ahmed Hegazi
CB	18	Mahmoud Hamdy
RWB	12	Akram Tawfik	(yellow card) 42'
LWB	20	Ahmed Fatouh
CM	13	Karim El Eraki		(substituted off) 62'
CM	2	Amar Hamdy		(substituted off) 84'
CM	10	Ramadan Sobhi (c)
SS	9	Taher Mohamed		(substituted off) 84'
CF	14	Ahmed Yasser Rayyan		(substituted off) 62'
Substitutions:
FW	7	Salah Mohsen		(substituted on) 62'
MF	15	Emam Ashour		(substituted on) 62'
MF	8	Nasser Maher		(substituted on) 84'
FW	21	Nasser Mansi		(substituted on) 84'
Head coach:
Shawky Gharieb

Assistant referees:
Anton Schetinin (Australia)
George Lakrindis (Australia)
Fourth official:
Adham Makhadmeh (Jordan)
Video assistant referee:
Marco Guida (Italy)
Assistant video assistant referee:
Guillermo Cuadra Fernández (Spain)

=== South Korea vs Mexico ===
31 July 2021
20:00

South Korea	3–6	Mexico
Lee Dong-gyeong 20', 51'; Hwang Ui-jo 90+1'	Report (TOCOG); Report (FIFA)	Martín 12', 54'; Romo 30'; Córdova 39' (pen.), 63'; Aguirre 84'

International Stadium Yokohama, Yokohama
Referee: Orel Grinfeld (Israel)

South Korea	Mexico

GK	1	Song Bum-keun
RB	12	Seol Young-woo
CB	5	Jeong Tae-uk (c)	(yellow card) 34'
CB	4	Park Ji-soo		(substituted off) 81'
LB	19	Kang Yoon-sung	(yellow card) 38'	(substituted off) 46'
DM	14	Kim Dong-hyun		(substituted off) 46'
DM	13	Kim Jin-ya
CM	21	Kim Jin-gyu		(substituted off) 46'
RF	11	Lee Dong-jun
CF	16	Hwang Ui-jo
LF	10	Lee Dong-gyeong
Substitutions:
FW	7	Kwon Chang-hoon		(substituted on) 46'
FW	17	Um Won-sang		(substituted on) 46'	(substituted off) 73'
MF	15	Won Du-jae	(yellow card) 49'	(substituted on) 46'
MF	8	Lee Kang-in		(substituted on) 73'
DF	3	Kim Jae-woo		(substituted on) 81'
Head coach:
Kim Hak-bum

GK	13	Guillermo Ochoa (c)
RB	2	Jorge Sánchez	(yellow card) 76'
CB	3	César Montes
CB	5	Johan Vásquez	(yellow card) 32'	(substituted off) 80'
LB	6	Vladimir Loroña
CM	7	Luis Romo
CM	16	José Joaquín Esquivel
RW	15	Uriel Antuna		(substituted off) 72'
AM	17	Sebastián Córdova		(substituted off) 73'
LW	11	Alexis Vega		(substituted off) 78'
CF	9	Henry Martín		(substituted off) 78'
Substitutions:
FW	10	Diego Lainez		(substituted on) 72'
MF	20	Fernando Beltrán		(substituted on) 73'
FW	18	Eduardo Aguirre		(substituted on) 78'
MF	19	Jesús Ricardo Angulo		(substituted on) 78'
DF	4	Jesús Alberto Angulo	(yellow card) 90'	(substituted on) 80'
Head coach:
Jaime Lozano

Assistant referees:
Roy Hassan (Israel)
Idan Yarkoni (Israel)
Fourth official:
Srđan Jovanović (Serbia)
Video assistant referee:
Roi Reinshreiber (Israel)
Assistant video assistant referee:
Paweł Raczkowski (Poland)

== Semi-finals ==
=== Mexico vs Brazil ===
3 August 2021
17:00

Mexico	0–0 (a.e.t.)	Brazil
	Report (TOCOG); Report (FIFA)
Penalties
Aguirre (penalty missed); Vásquez (penalty missed); Rodríguez (penalty scored)	1–4	(penalty scored) Dani Alves; (penalty scored) Martinelli; (penalty scored) Guimarães; (penalty scored) Reinier

Kashima Stadium, Kashima
Referee: Georgi Kabakov (Bulgaria)

Mexico	Brazil

GK	13	Guillermo Ochoa (c)
RB	6	Vladimir Loroña	(yellow card) 76'
CB	3	César Montes	(yellow card) 40'
CB	5	Johan Vásquez
LB	4	Jesús Alberto Angulo		(substituted off) 98'
CM	7	Luis Romo	(yellow card) 105'
CM	16	José Joaquín Esquivel		(substituted off) 46'
RW	15	Uriel Antuna		(substituted off) 62'
AM	17	Sebastián Córdova		(substituted off) 78'
LW	11	Alexis Vega		(substituted off) 90+2'
CF	9	Henry Martín		(substituted off) 98'
Substitutions:
MF	8	Charly Rodríguez		(substituted on) 46'
FW	10	Diego Lainez	(yellow card) 74'	(substituted on) 62'
FW	19	Jesús Ricardo Angulo		(substituted on) 78'
FW	21	Roberto Alvarado		(substituted on) 90+2'
DF	12	Adrián Mora		(substituted on) 98'
FW	18	Eduardo Aguirre		(substituted on) 98'
Head coach:
Jaime Lozano

GK	1	Aderbar Santos
RB	13	Dani Alves (c)
CB	15	Nino
CB	3	Diego Carlos	(yellow card) 37'
LB	6	Guilherme Arana
CM	8	Bruno Guimarães	(yellow card) 72'
CM	5	Douglas Luiz	(yellow card) 110'	(substituted off) 115'
RW	11	Antony	(yellow card) 64'	(substituted off) 91'
AM	20	Claudinho		(substituted off) 72'
LW	7	Paulinho		(substituted off) 67'
CF	10	Richarlison
Substitutions:
FW	21	Gabriel Martinelli		(substituted on) 67'
MF	19	Reinier	(yellow card) 76'	(substituted on) 72'
FW	17	Malcom		(substituted on) 91'
MF	18	Matheus Henrique		(substituted on) 115'
Head coach:
André Jardine

Assistant referees:
Martin Margaritov (Bulgaria)
Diyan Valkov (Bulgaria)
Fourth official:
Bamlak Tessema Weyesa (Ethiopia)
Reserve assistant referee:
Mohammed Ibrahim (Sudan)
Video assistant referee:
Marco Guida (Italy)
Assistant video assistant referee:
Benoît Millot (France)

=== Japan vs Spain ===
3 August 2021
20:00

Japan	0–1 (a.e.t.)	Spain
	Report (TOCOG); Report (FIFA)	Asensio 115'

Saitama Stadium 2002, Saitama
Referee: Kevin Ortega (Peru)

Japan	Spain

GK	12	Kosei Tani
RB	2	Hiroki Sakai	(yellow card) 99'
CB	5	Maya Yoshida (c)
CB	4	Ko Itakura
LB	3	Yuta Nakayama
DM	6	Wataru Endo
CM	17	Ao Tanaka		(substituted off) 118'
CM	13	Reo Hatate		(substituted off) 65'
RW	10	Ritsu Dōan		(substituted off) 91'
LW	7	Takefusa Kubo		(substituted off) 91'
CF	19	Daichi Hayashi		(substituted off) 65'
Substitutions:
FW	16	Yuki Soma		(substituted on) 65'
FW	18	Ayase Ueda		(substituted on) 65'
MF	8	Koji Miyoshi		(substituted on) 91'
FW	9	Daizen Maeda		(substituted on) 91'
DF	15	Daiki Hashioka		(substituted on) 118'
Head coach:
Hajime Moriyasu

GK	1	Unai Simón
RB	18	Óscar Gil	(yellow card) 13'	(substituted off) 46'
CB	12	Eric García
CB	4	Pau Torres
LB	3	Marc Cucurella		(substituted off) 106'
DM	6	Martín Zubimendi	(yellow card) 90+5'	(substituted off) 97'
CM	8	Mikel Merino (c)	(yellow card) 51'	(substituted off) 59'
CM	16	Pedri		(substituted off) 84'
AM	19	Dani Olmo		(substituted off) 59'
SS	11	Mikel Oyarzabal
CF	9	Rafa Mir	(yellow card) 117'
Substitutions:
DF	5	Jesús Vallejo	(yellow card) 110'	(substituted on) 46'
MF	14	Carlos Soler		(substituted on) 59'
FW	17	Javi Puado		(substituted on) 59'
FW	7	Marco Asensio	(yellow card) 115'	(substituted on) 84'
MF	15	Jon Moncayola		(substituted on) 97'
DF	20	Juan Miranda		(substituted on) 106'
Head coach:
Luis de la Fuente

Assistant referees:
Michael Orué (Peru)
Jesús Sánchez (Peru)
Fourth official:
Matthew Conger (New Zealand)
Reserve assistant referee:
Mark Rule (New Zealand)
Video assistant referee:
Mauro Vigliano (Argentina)
Assistant video assistant referee:
Andrés Cunha (Uruguay)

== Bronze medal match ==
The bronze medal match was originally scheduled to be held on 6 August 2021, 20:00. Due to the postponement of the women's football tournament gold medal match from 11:00 to 21:00, the game was moved to 18:00 on the same day at the same venue.

6 August 2021
18:00

Mexico	3–1	Japan
Córdova 13' (pen.); Vásquez 22'; Vega 58'	Report (TOCOG); Report (FIFA)	Mitoma 78'

Saitama Stadium 2002, Saitama
Referee: Bamlak Tessema Weyesa (Ethiopia)

Mexico	Japan

GK	13	Guillermo Ochoa (c)	(yellow card) 90+3'
RB	2	Jorge Sánchez	(yellow card) 42'
CB	3	César Montes
CB	5	Johan Vásquez	(yellow card) 27'
LB	4	Jesús Alberto Angulo
CM	7	Luis Romo
CM	8	Charly Rodríguez		(substituted off) 86'
RW	10	Diego Lainez		(substituted off) 56'
AM	17	Sebastián Córdova		(substituted off) 78'
LW	11	Alexis Vega		(substituted off) 78'
CF	9	Henry Martín		(substituted off) 86'
Substitutions:
FW	15	Uriel Antuna		(substituted on) 56'
FW	21	Roberto Alvarado		(substituted on) 78'
MF	20	Fernando Beltrán		(substituted on) 78'
MF	16	José Joaquín Esquivel		(substituted on) 86'
FW	18	Eduardo Aguirre		(substituted on) 86'
Head coach:
Jaime Lozano

GK	12	Kosei Tani
RB	2	Hiroki Sakai
CB	14	Takehiro Tomiyasu
CB	5	Maya Yoshida (c)
LB	3	Yuta Nakayama		(substituted off) 62'
DM	6	Wataru Endo	(yellow card) 19'	(substituted off) 80'
RM	10	Ritsu Dōan
CM	17	Ao Tanaka		(substituted off) 71'
LM	16	Yuki Soma		(substituted off) 46'
SS	7	Takefusa Kubo
CF	19	Daichi Hayashi		(substituted off) 62'
Substitutions:
MF	13	Reo Hatate		(substituted on) 46'
FW	11	Kaoru Mitoma		(substituted on) 62'
FW	18	Ayase Ueda	(yellow card) 80'	(substituted on) 62'
DF	4	Ko Itakura		(substituted on) 71'
MF	8	Koji Miyoshi		(substituted on) 80'
Head coach:
Hajime Moriyasu

Assistant referees:
Mohammed Ibrahim (Sudan)
Gilbert Cheruiyot (Kenya)
Fourth official:
Matthew Conger (New Zealand)
Reserve assistant referee:
Mark Rule (New Zealand)
Video assistant referee:
Benoît Millot (France)
Assistant video assistant referees:
Tiago Martins (Portugal)
Guillermo Cuadra Fernández (Spain)

== Gold medal match ==
7 August 2021
20:30

Brazil	2–1 (a.e.t.)	Spain
Cunha 45+2'; Malcom 108'	Report (TOCOG); Report (FIFA)	Oyarzabal 61'

International Stadium Yokohama, Yokohama
Attendance: 0 (Note: Played behind closed doors due to the COVID-19 pandemic in Japan)
Referee: Chris Beath (Australia)

Brazil	Spain

GK	1	Aderbar Santos
RB	13	Dani Alves (c)
CB	15	Nino
CB	3	Diego Carlos
LB	6	Guilherme Arana	(yellow card) 20'
CM	8	Bruno Guimarães
CM	5	Douglas Luiz	(yellow card) 89'
RW	11	Antony		(substituted off) 112'
AM	20	Claudinho		(substituted off) 106'
LW	9	Matheus Cunha	(yellow card) 64'	(substituted off) 91'
CF	10	Richarlison	(yellow card) 31'	(substituted off) 114'
Substitutes:
GK	12	Brenno
DF	4	Ricardo Graça
MF	2	Gabriel Menino		(substituted on) 112'
MF	18	Matheus Henrique
MF	19	Reinier		(substituted on) 106'
FW	7	Paulinho		(substituted on) 114'
FW	17	Malcom		(substituted on) 91'
Head coach:
André Jardine

GK	1	Unai Simón
RB	18	Óscar Gil		(substituted off) 91'
CB	12	Eric García	(yellow card) 27'
CB	4	Pau Torres
LB	3	Marc Cucurella		(substituted off) 91'
DM	6	Martín Zubimendi		(substituted off) 112'
CM	8	Mikel Merino (c)		(substituted off) 46'
CM	16	Pedri
RF	7	Marco Asensio		(substituted off) 46'
CF	11	Mikel Oyarzabal		(substituted off) 104'
LF	19	Dani Olmo
Substitutes:
GK	13	Álvaro Fernández
DF	5	Jesús Vallejo		(substituted on) 91'
DF	20	Juan Miranda		(substituted on) 91'
MF	14	Carlos Soler		(substituted on) 46'
MF	15	Jon Moncayola		(substituted on) 112'
MF	21	Bryan Gil	(yellow card) 105+1'	(substituted on) 46'
FW	9	Rafa Mir		(substituted on) 104'
Head coach:
Luis de la Fuente

Assistant referees:
Anton Schetinin (Australia)
George Lakrindis (Australia)
Fourth official:
Artur Soares Dias (Portugal)
Reserve assistant referee:
Rui Tavares (Portugal)
Video assistant referee:
Abdulla Al-Marri (Qatar)
Assistant video assistant referees:
Muhammad Taqi (Singapore)
Chris Penso (United States)
