= Football at the 2020 Summer Olympics – Men's tournament – Group D =

Football at the Olympics

Group D of the men's football tournament at the 2020 Summer Olympics was played from 22 to 28 July 2021 in Rifu's Miyagi Stadium, Saitama's Saitama Stadium and Yokohama's International Stadium Yokohama. The group consisted of defending gold medalists Brazil, Germany, Ivory Coast and Saudi Arabia. The top two teams, Brazil and Ivory Coast, advanced to the knockout stage.

== Teams ==
Draw position	Team	Pot	Confederation	Method of qualification	Date of qualification	Olympic appearance	Last appearance	Previous best performance
D1	Brazil	1	CONMEBOL	2020 CONMEBOL Pre-Olympic Tournament runners-up	9 February 2020	14th	2016	Gold medalists (2016)
D2	Germany	2	UEFA	2019 UEFA European Under-21 Championship runners-up	30 June 2019	10th	2016	Silver medalists (2016)
D3	Ivory Coast	3	CAF	2019 Africa U-23 Cup of Nations runners-up	22 November 2019	2nd	2008	Sixth place (2008)
D4	Saudi Arabia	4	AFC	2020 AFC U-23 Championship runners-up	30 June 2019	3rd	1996	15th place (1996)

== Standings ==
Pos	Team	Pld	W	D	L	GF	GA	GD	Pts	Qualification
1	Brazil	3	2	1	0	7	3	+4	7	Advance to knockout stage
2	Ivory Coast	3	1	2	0	3	2	+1	5	Advance to knockout stage
3	Germany	3	1	1	1	6	7	−1	4	
4	Saudi Arabia	3	0	0	3	4	8	−4	0	

Source: TOCOG and FIFA
Rules for classification: Group stage tiebreakers

In the quarter-finals,

- The winners of Group D, Brazil, advanced to play the runners-up of Group C, Egypt.
- The runners-up of Group D, Ivory Coast, advanced to play the winners of Group C, Spain.

== Matches ==
=== Ivory Coast vs Saudi Arabia ===
22 July 2021
17:30

Ivory Coast	2–1	Saudi Arabia
Al-Amri 39' (o.g.); Kessié 66'	Report (TOCOG); Report (FIFA)	Al-Dawsari 44'

International Stadium Yokohama, Yokohama
Referee: Matthew Conger (New Zealand)

Ivory Coast	Saudi Arabia

GK	16	Ira Eliezer Tapé
RB	6	Wilfried Singo
CB	4	Kouadio-Yves Dabila
CB	3	Eric Bailly
LB	5	Ismaël Diallo
CM	12	Eboue Kouassi
CM	7	Idrissa Doumbia		(substituted off) 65'
RW	10	Amad Diallo		(substituted off) 90+2'
AM	8	Franck Kessié	(yellow card) 73'
LW	15	Max Gradel (c)	(yellow card) 86'	(substituted off) 90+1'
CF	11	Christian Kouamé
Substitutions:
FW	9	Youssouf Dao		(substituted on) 65'
FW	20	Aboubacar Doumbia	(red card) 90+7'	(substituted on) 90+1'
FW	18	Cheick Timité		(substituted on) 90+2'
Head coach:
Soualiho Haïdara

GK	12	Mohammed Al Rubaie
RB	2	Saud Abdulhamid
CB	5	Abdulelah Al-Amri		(substituted off) 76'
CB	4	Abdulbasit Hindi
LB	13	Yasser Al-Shahrani
CM	7	Salman Al-Faraj (c)	(yellow card) 90+7'
CM	14	Ali Al-Hassan		(substituted off) 76'
RW	15	Ayman Yahya		(substituted off) 68'
AM	6	Sami Al-Najei	(yellow card) 80'
LW	10	Salem Al-Dawsari
CF	9	Abdullah Al-Hamdan		(substituted off) 63'
Substitutions:
MF	18	Abdulrahman Ghareeb		(substituted on) 63'
MF	17	Ayman Al-Khulaif		(substituted on) 68'
FW	11	Khalid Al-Ghannam		(substituted on) 76'
DF	16	Khalifah Al-Dawsari		(substituted on) 76'
Head coach:
Saad Al-Shehri

Assistant referees:
Mark Rule (New Zealand)
Tevita Makasini (Tonga)
Fourth official:
Orel Grinfeld (Israel)
Video assistant referee:
Paweł Raczkowski (Poland)
Assistant video assistant referee:
Roi Reinshreiber (Israel)

=== Brazil vs Germany ===
22 July 2021
20:30

Brazil	4–2	Germany
Richarlison 7', 22', 30'; Paulinho 90+5'	Report (TOCOG); Report (FIFA)	Amiri 57'; Ache 84'

International Stadium Yokohama, Yokohama
Referee: Iván Barton (El Salvador)

Brazil	Germany

GK	1	Aderbar Santos
RB	13	Dani Alves (c)
CB	15	Nino
CB	3	Diego Carlos
LB	6	Guilherme Arana
CM	8	Bruno Guimarães
CM	5	Douglas Luiz	(yellow card) 83'
RW	11	Antony		(substituted off) 74'
AM	20	Claudinho		(substituted off) 65'
LW	9	Matheus Cunha
CF	10	Richarlison		(substituted off) 74'
Substitutions:
FW	17	Malcom		(substituted on) 65'
FW	7	Paulinho		(substituted on) 74'
MF	19	Reinier		(substituted on) 74'
Head coach:
André Jardine

GK	1	Florian Müller
CB	5	Amos Pieper	(yellow card) 26'	(substituted off) 46'
CB	17	Anton Stach	(yellow card) 59'	(substituted off) 81'
CB	4	Felix Uduokhai
RM	13	Arne Maier
CM	8	Maximilian Arnold (c)	(yellow card) 35' (yellow-red card) 63'
LM	11	Nadiem Amiri		(substituted off) 74'
RW	2	Benjamin Henrichs	(yellow card) 86'
AM	7	Marco Richter		(substituted off) 68'
LW	3	David Raum
CF	10	Max Kruse		(substituted off) 68'
Substitutions:
DF	15	Jordan Torunarigha	(yellow card) 87'	(substituted on) 46'
FW	6	Ragnar Ache		(substituted on) 68'
MF	18	Eduard Löwen		(substituted on) 68'
FW	9	Cedric Teuchert		(substituted on) 74'
DF	16	Keven Schlotterbeck		(substituted on) 81'
Head coach:
Stefan Kuntz

Assistant referees:
David Moran (El Salvador)
Zachari Zeegelaar (Suriname)
Fourth official:
Georgi Kabakov (Bulgaria)
Video assistant referee:
Marco Guida (Italy)
Assistant video assistant referee:
Erick Miranda (Mexico)

=== Brazil vs Ivory Coast ===
25 July 2021
17:30

Brazil	0–0	Ivory Coast
	Report (TOCOG); Report (FIFA)

International Stadium Yokohama, Yokohama
Referee: Ismail Elfath (United States)

Brazil	Ivory Coast

GK	1	Aderbar Santos
RB	13	Dani Alves (c)
CB	15	Nino
CB	3	Diego Carlos
LB	6	Guilherme Arana
CM	8	Bruno Guimarães
CM	5	Douglas Luiz	(red card) 13'
RW	11	Antony		(substituted off) 74'
AM	20	Claudinho
LW	9	Matheus Cunha		(substituted off) 74'
CF	10	Richarlison		(substituted off) 79'
Substitutions:
FW	21	Gabriel Martinelli		(substituted on) 74'
FW	17	Malcom		(substituted on) 74'
FW	7	Paulinho		(substituted on) 79'
Head coach:
André Jardine

GK	16	Ira Eliezer Tapé
RB	6	Wilfried Singo
CB	3	Eric Bailly
CB	4	Kouadio-Yves Dabila
LB	5	Ismaël Diallo
RM	17	Zié Ouattara		(substituted off) 64'
CM	12	Eboue Kouassi	(yellow card) 65' (yellow-red card) 79'
CM	8	Franck Kessié		(substituted off) 90+3'
LM	15	Max Gradel (c)		(substituted off) 90+3'
SS	10	Amad Diallo		(substituted off) 64'
CF	9	Youssouf Dao		(substituted off) 75'
Substitutions:
FW	11	Christian Kouamé		(substituted on) 63'
DF	19	Koffi Kouao		(substituted on) 64'
FW	18	Cheick Timité		(substituted on) 75'
FW	13	Kader Keïta		(substituted on) 90+3'
MF	7	Idrissa Doumbia		(substituted on) 90+3'
Head coach:
Soualiho Haïdara

Assistant referees:
Corey Parker (United States)
Kyle Atkins (United States)
Fourth official:
Srđan Jovanović (Serbia)
Video assistant referee:
Edvin Jurisevic (United States)
Assistant video assistant referee:
Mahmoud Mohamed Ashour (Egypt)

=== Saudi Arabia vs Germany ===
25 July 2021
20:30

Saudi Arabia	2–3	Germany
Al-Najei 30', 50'	Report (TOCOG); Report (FIFA)	Amiri 11'; Ache 43'; Uduokhai 75'

International Stadium Yokohama, Yokohama
Referee: Victor Gomes (South Africa)

Saudi Arabia	Germany

GK	12	Mohammed Al Rubaie
RB	2	Saud Abdulhamid		(substituted off) 87'
CB	5	Abdulelah Al-Amri
CB	4	Abdulbasit Hindi		(substituted off) 86'
LB	13	Yasser Al-Shahrani
CM	14	Ali Al-Hassan
CM	7	Salman Al-Faraj (c)		(substituted off) 86'
RW	17	Ayman Al-Khulaif		(substituted off) 69'
AM	6	Sami Al-Najei
LW	10	Salem Al-Dawsari
CF	9	Abdullah Al-Hamdan	(yellow card) 90+5'
Substitutions:
FW	18	Abdulrahman Ghareeb		(substituted on) 69'
FW	15	Ayman Yahya		(substituted on) 86'
DF	16	Khalifah Al-Dawsari		(substituted on) 86'
DF	3	Hamad Al-Yami		(substituted on) 87'
Head coach:
Saad Al-Shehri

GK	1	Florian Müller
RB	2	Benjamin Henrichs
CB	5	Amos Pieper	(red card) 68'
CB	4	Felix Uduokhai
LB	3	David Raum
CM	13	Arne Maier		(substituted off) 70'
CM	18	Eduard Löwen
CM	11	Nadiem Amiri		(substituted off) 73'
AM	10	Max Kruse (c)
CF	9	Cedric Teuchert		(substituted off) 70'
CF	6	Ragnar Ache		(substituted off) 83'
Substitutions:
MF	17	Anton Stach		(substituted on) 70'
DF	15	Jordan Torunarigha		(substituted on) 70'
DF	16	Keven Schlotterbeck		(substituted on) 73'
MF	7	Marco Richter		(substituted on) 83'
Head coach:
Stefan Kuntz

Assistant referees:
Arsenio Marengula (Mozambique)
Souru Phatsoane (Lesotho)
Fourth official:
Matthew Conger (New Zealand)
Video assistant referee:
Fu Ming (China PR)
Assistant video assistant referee:
Tiago Martins (Portugal)

=== Saudi Arabia vs Brazil ===
28 July 2021
17:00

Saudi Arabia	1–3	Brazil
Al-Amri 27'	Report (TOCOG); Report (FIFA)	Cunha 14'; Richarlison 76', 90+3'

Saitama Stadium 2002, Saitama
Referee: Bamlak Tessema Weyesa (Ethiopia)

Saudi Arabia	Brazil

GK	1	Amin Bukhari	(yellow card) 90+4'
CB	5	Abdulelah Al-Amri
CB	16	Khalifah Al-Dawsari	(yellow card) 80'
CB	4	Abdulbasit Hindi
RM	2	Saud Abdulhamid
CM	14	Ali Al-Hassan		(substituted off) 61'
CM	7	Salman Al-Faraj (c)		(substituted off) 89'
LM	13	Yasser Al-Shahrani	(yellow card) 29'
RF	6	Sami Al-Najei		(substituted off) 61'
CF	9	Abdullah Al-Hamdan		(substituted off) 76'
LF	10	Salem Al-Dawsari		(substituted off) 89'
Substitutions:
MF	20	Mukhtar Ali	(yellow card) 74'	(substituted on) 61'
MF	18	Abdulrahman Ghareeb		(substituted on) 61'
FW	19	Firas Al-Buraikan		(substituted on) 76'
MF	11	Khalid Al-Ghannam		(substituted on) 89'
MF	8	Nasser Al-Omran		(substituted on) 89'
Head coach:
Saad Al-Shehri

GK	1	Aderbar Santos
RB	13	Dani Alves (c)	(yellow card) 90+8'
CB	15	Nino
CB	3	Diego Carlos
LB	6	Guilherme Arana	(yellow card) 26'	(substituted off) 90+1'
CM	8	Bruno Guimarães		(substituted off) 84'
CM	18	Matheus Henrique
RW	11	Antony		(substituted off) 46'
AM	20	Claudinho		(substituted off) 71'
LW	9	Matheus Cunha		(substituted off) 84'
CF	10	Richarlison
Substitutions:
FW	17	Malcom		(substituted on) 46'
MF	19	Reinier		(substituted on) 71'
MF	2	Gabriel Menino		(substituted on) 84'
FW	21	Gabriel Martinelli	(yellow card) 90+6'	(substituted on) 84'
DF	16	Abner		(substituted on) 90+1'
Head coach:
André Jardine

Assistant referees:
Mohammed Ibrahim (Sudan)
Gilbert Cheruiyot (Kenya)
Fourth official:
Srđan Jovanović (Serbia)
Video assistant referee:
Benoît Millot (France)
Assistant video assistant referee:
Tiago Martins (Portugal)

=== Germany vs Ivory Coast ===
28 July 2021
17:00

Germany	1–1	Ivory Coast
Löwen 73'	Report (TOCOG); Report (FIFA)	Henrichs 67' (o.g.)

Miyagi Stadium, Rifu
Attendance: 4,294
Referee: Leodán González (Uruguay)

Germany	Ivory Coast

GK	1	Florian Müller
RB	2	Benjamin Henrichs
CB	15	Jordan Torunarigha
CB	4	Felix Uduokhai
LB	3	David Raum
CM	13	Arne Maier		(substituted off) 79'
CM	8	Maximilian Arnold (c)	(yellow card) 30'	(substituted off) 46'
CM	11	Nadiem Amiri		(substituted off) 88'
AM	7	Marco Richter		(substituted off) 62'
CF	10	Max Kruse
CF	6	Ragnar Ache
Substitutions:
MF	18	Eduard Löwen		(substituted on) 46'
FW	9	Cedric Teuchert		(substituted on) 62'
MF	17	Anton Stach		(substituted on) 79'
DF	16	Keven Schlotterbeck		(substituted on) 88'
Head coach:
Stefan Kuntz

GK	16	Ira Eliezer Tapé
RB	6	Wilfried Singo
CB	3	Eric Bailly
CB	4	Kouadio-Yves Dabila
LB	5	Ismaël Diallo
CM	7	Idrissa Doumbia		(substituted off) 57'
CM	13	Kader Keïta	(yellow card) 21'
RW	11	Christian Kouamé	(yellow card) 1'	(substituted off) 90+3'
AM	8	Franck Kessié
LW	15	Max Gradel (c)
CF	9	Youssouf Dao
Substitutions:
FW	10	Amad Diallo		(substituted on) 57'
DF	17	Zié Ouattara		(substituted on) 90+3'
Head coach:
Soualiho Haïdara

Assistant referees:
Nicolás Taran (Uruguay)
Richard Trinidad (Uruguay)
Fourth official:
Chris Beath (Australia)
Video assistant referee:
Mauro Vigliano (Argentina)
Assistant video assistant referee:
Roi Reinshreiber (Israel)

== Discipline ==
Fair play points would have been used as a tiebreaker if the overall and head-to-head records of teams were tied. These were calculated based on yellow and red cards received in all group matches as follows:

- first yellow card: minus 1 point;
- indirect red card (second yellow card): minus 3 points;
- direct red card: minus 4 points;
- yellow card and direct red card: minus 5 points;

Only one of the above deductions is applied to a player in a single match.

Team	Match 1				Match 2				Match 3				Points
Team	Booked	(yellow card) (yellow-red card)	Sent off (straight red)	(yellow card) (red card)	Booked	(yellow card) (yellow-red card)	Sent off (straight red)	(yellow card) (red card)	Booked	(yellow card) (yellow-red card)	Sent off (straight red)	(yellow card) (red card)	Points
Saudi Arabia	2				1				4				–7
Brazil	1						1		3				–8
Ivory Coast	2		1			1			2				–11
Germany	4	1					1		1				–12
