= Football at the 2020 Summer Olympics – Men's tournament – Group C =

Football at the Olympics

Group C of the men's football tournament at the 2020 Summer Olympics was played from 22 to 28 July 2021 in Rifu's Miyagi Stadium, Saitama's Saitama Stadium and Sapporo's Sapporo Dome. The group consisted of Argentina, Australia, Egypt and Spain. The top two teams, Spain and Egypt, advanced to the knockout stage.

== Teams ==
Draw position	Team	Pot	Confederation	Method of qualification	Date of qualification	Olympic appearance	Last appearance	Previous best performance
C1	Egypt	3	CAF	2019 Africa U-23 Cup of Nations champions	22 November 2019	12th	2012	Fourth place (1928, 1964)
C2	Spain	2	UEFA	2019 UEFA European Under-21 Championship champions	30 June 2019	11th	2012	Gold medalists (1992)
C3	Argentina	1	CONMEBOL	2020 CONMEBOL Pre-Olympic Tournament champions	9 February 2020	9th	2016	Gold medalists (2004, 2008)
C4	Australia	4	AFC	2020 AFC U-23 Championship third place	25 January 2020	8th	2008	Fourth place (1992)

== Standings ==
Pos	Team	Pld	W	D	L	GF	GA	GD	Pts	Qualification
1	Spain	3	1	2	0	2	1	+1	5	Advance to knockout stage
2	Egypt	3	1	1	1	2	1	+1	4	Advance to knockout stage
3	Argentina	3	1	1	1	2	3	−1	4	
4	Australia	3	1	0	2	2	3	−1	3	

Source: TOCOG and FIFA
Rules for classification: Group stage tiebreakers

In the quarter-finals,

- The winners of Group C, Spain, advanced to play the runners-up of Group D, Ivory Coast.
- The runners-up of Group C, Egypt, advanced to play the winners of Group D, Brazil.

== Matches ==
=== Egypt vs Spain ===
22 July 2021
16:30

Egypt	0–0	Spain
	Report (TOCOG); Report (FIFA)

Sapporo Dome, Sapporo
Referee: Adham Makhadmeh (Jordan)

Egypt	Spain

GK	1	Mohamed El Shenawy
CB	18	Mahmoud Hamdy
CB	6	Ahmed Hegazi (c)	(yellow card) 78'
CB	4	Osama Galal	(yellow card) 89'
RWB	12	Akram Tawfik
LWB	20	Ahmed Fatouh	(yellow card) 5'
CM	13	Karim El Eraki		(substituted off) 89'
CM	15	Emam Ashour		(substituted off) 63'
CM	10	Ramadan Sobhi		(substituted off) 90+3'
SS	9	Taher Mohamed	(yellow card) 44'	(substituted off) 62'
CF	14	Ahmed Yasser Rayyan		(substituted off) 63'
Substitutions:
FW	11	Ibrahim Adel		(substituted on) 62'
FW	7	Salah Mohsen		(substituted on) 63'
MF	2	Amar Hamdy		(substituted on) 63'
FW	3	Karim Fouad		(substituted on) 89'
DF	17	Ahmed Ramadan		(substituted on) 90+3'
Head coach:
Shawky Gharieb

GK	1	Unai Simón
RB	2	Óscar Mingueza	(substituted off) 23'
CB	12	Eric García
CB	4	Pau Torres
LB	20	Juan Miranda
CM	8	Mikel Merino	(substituted off) 68'
CM	10	Dani Ceballos (c)	(substituted off) 45+1'
CM	16	Pedri
AM	19	Dani Olmo
CF	7	Marco Asensio	(substituted off) 68'
CF	11	Mikel Oyarzabal	(substituted off) 68'
Substitutions:
DF	5	Jesús Vallejo	(substituted on) 23'
MF	15	Jon Moncayola	(substituted on) 45+1'
FW	9	Rafa Mir	(substituted on) 68'
MF	21	Bryan Gil	(substituted on) 68'
MF	14	Carlos Soler	(substituted on) 68'
Head coach:
Luis de la Fuente

Assistant referees:
Ahmad Al-Roalle (Jordan)
Mohammad Al-Kalaf (Jordan)
Fourth official:
Hiroyuki Kimura (Japan)
Video assistant referee:
Abdulla Al-Marri (Qatar)
Assistant video assistant referee:
Wagner Reway (Brazil)

=== Argentina vs Australia ===
22 July 2021
19:30

Argentina	0–2	Australia
	Report (TOCOG); Report (FIFA)	Wales 14'; Tilio 80'

Sapporo Dome, Sapporo
Referee: Srđan Jovanović (Serbia)

Argentina	Australia

GK	1	Jeremías Ledesma
RB	4	Hernán de la Fuente		(substituted off) 62'
CB	2	Nehuén Pérez (c)
CB	14	Facundo Medina	(yellow card) 67'
LB	19	Francisco Ortega	(yellow card) 45+2' (yellow-red card) 45+3'
DM	5	Fausto Vera
CM	8	Santiago Colombatto		(substituted off) 78'
CM	10	Alexis Mac Allister		(substituted off) 78'
RW	21	Carlos Valenzuela		(substituted off) 46'
LW	11	Ezequiel Barco		(substituted off) 82'
CF	9	Adolfo Gaich	(yellow card) 63'
Substitutions:
FW	18	Ezequiel Ponce	(yellow card) 85'	(substituted on) 46'
DF	13	Marcelo Herrera		(substituted on) 62'
MF	17	Tomás Belmonte		(substituted on) 78'
MF	16	Martín Payero		(substituted on) 78'
FW	15	Pedro de la Vega		(substituted on) 82'
Head coach:
Fernando Batista

GK	1	Tom Glover
RB	2	Nathaniel Atkinson	(yellow card) 48'
CB	14	Thomas Deng (c)
CB	5	Harry Souttar	(yellow card) 86'
LB	16	Joel King
RM	20	Lachlan Wales		(substituted off) 72'
CM	17	Connor Metcalfe	(yellow card) 50'
LM	11	Daniel Arzani		(substituted off) 79'
AM	8	Riley McGree	(yellow card) 45+3'	(substituted off) 79'
AM	10	Denis Genreau	(yellow card) 56'	(substituted off) 89'
CF	12	Mitchell Duke	(yellow card) 32'
Substitutions:
MF	15	Caleb Watts	(yellow card) 90+1'	(substituted on) 72'
FW	19	Marco Tilio		(substituted on) 79'
FW	9	Nicholas D'Agostino		(substituted on) 79'
MF	6	Keanu Baccus		(substituted on) 89'
Head coach:
Graham Arnold

Assistant referees:
Uros Stojkovic (Serbia)
Milan Mihajlovic (Serbia)
Fourth official:
Hiroyuki Kimura (Japan)
Video assistant referee:
Tiago Martins (Portugal)
Assistant video assistant referee:
Muhammad Taqi (Singapore)

=== Egypt vs Argentina ===
25 July 2021
16:30

Egypt	0–1	Argentina
	Report (TOCOG); Report (FIFA)	Medina 52'

Sapporo Dome, Sapporo
Referee: Georgi Kabakov (Bulgaria)

Egypt	Argentina

GK	1	Mohamed El Shenawy
CB	4	Osama Galal	(substituted off) 79'
CB	6	Ahmed Hegazi (c)
CB	18	Mahmoud Hamdy
RWB	12	Akram Tawfik
LWB	20	Ahmed Fatouh
CM	13	Karim El Eraki	(substituted off) 46'
CM	2	Amar Hamdy	(substituted off) 60'
CM	10	Ramadan Sobhi
SS	7	Salah Mohsen	(substituted off) 60'
CF	14	Ahmed Yasser Rayyan
Substitutions:
FW	3	Karim Fouad	(substituted on) 46'
FW	9	Taher Mohamed	(substituted on) 60'
FW	11	Ibrahim Adel	(substituted on) 60'
MF	8	Nasser Maher	(substituted on) 79'
Head coach:
Shawky Gharieb

GK	1	Jeremías Ledesma
RB	4	Hernán de la Fuente
CB	2	Nehuén Pérez (c)	(yellow card) 86'
CB	14	Facundo Medina
LB	3	Claudio Bravo
DM	5	Fausto Vera
CM	16	Martín Payero		(substituted off) 79'
CM	10	Alexis Mac Allister		(substituted off) 89'
RW	15	Pedro de la Vega	(yellow card) 84'
LW	11	Ezequiel Barco		(substituted off) 62'
CF	9	Adolfo Gaich		(substituted off) 62'
Substitutions:
FW	7	Agustín Urzi		(substituted on) 62'
FW	18	Ezequiel Ponce	(yellow card) 72'	(substituted on) 62'
MF	17	Tomás Belmonte	(yellow card) 84'	(substituted on) 79'
MF	20	Thiago Almada		(substituted on) 89'
Head coach:
Fernando Batista

Assistant referees:
Martin Margaritov (Bulgaria)
Diyan Valkov (Bulgaria)
Fourth official:
Hiroyuki Kimura (Japan)
Video assistant referee:
Abdulla Al-Marri (Qatar)
Assistant video assistant referee:
Chris Penso (United States)

=== Australia vs Spain ===
25 July 2021
19:30

Australia	0–1	Spain
	Report (TOCOG); Report (FIFA)	Oyarzabal 81'

Sapporo Dome, Sapporo
Referee: Bamlak Tessema Weyesa (Ethiopia)

Australia	Spain

GK	1	Tom Glover
RB	2	Nathaniel Atkinson	(yellow card) 90+5'
CB	14	Thomas Deng (c)		(substituted off) 83'
CB	5	Harry Souttar
LB	16	Joel King
RM	20	Lachlan Wales	(yellow card) 43'	(substituted off) 63'
CM	17	Connor Metcalfe
LM	11	Daniel Arzani		(substituted off) 63'
AM	8	Riley McGree	(yellow card) 52'	(substituted off) 73'
AM	10	Denis Genreau		(substituted off) 72'
CF	12	Mitchell Duke	(yellow card) 57'
Substitutions:
FW	19	Marco Tilio		(substituted on) 63'
DF	3	Kye Rowles		(substituted on) 63'
MF	15	Caleb Watts		(substituted on) 72'
MF	6	Keanu Baccus		(substituted on) 73'
FW	9	Nicholas D'Agostino		(substituted on) 83'
Head coach:
Graham Arnold

GK	1	Unai Simón	(yellow card) 90+1'
RB	18	Óscar Gil	(yellow card) 3'	(substituted off) 77'
CB	12	Eric García
CB	4	Pau Torres
LB	3	Marc Cucurella
DM	6	Martín Zubimendi
CM	14	Carlos Soler		(substituted off) 68'
CM	16	Pedri
AM	19	Dani Olmo
CF	17	Javi Puado		(substituted off) 57'
CF	11	Mikel Oyarzabal (c)
Substitutions:
FW	21	Bryan Gil		(substituted on) 57'
FW	7	Marco Asensio		(substituted on) 68'
FW	9	Rafa Mir		(substituted on) 77'
Head coach:
Luis de la Fuente

Assistant referees:
Mohammed Ibrahim (Sudan)
Gilbert Cheruiyot (Kenya)
Fourth official:
Hiroyuki Kimura (Japan)
Video assistant referee:
Bibiana Steinhaus (Germany)
Assistant video assistant referee:
Muhammad Taqi (Singapore)

=== Australia vs Egypt ===
28 July 2021
20:00

Australia	0–2	Egypt
	Report (TOCOG); Report (FIFA)	Rayyan 44'; A. Hamdy 85'

Miyagi Stadium, Rifu
Attendance: 4,471
Referee: Artur Soares Dias (Portugal)

Australia	Egypt

GK	1	Tom Glover
CB	3	Kye Rowles
CB	14	Thomas Deng (c)
CB	5	Harry Souttar
CM	13	Dylan Pierias		(substituted off) 46'
CM	17	Connor Metcalfe		(substituted off) 90+2'
CM	16	Joel King
RW	20	Lachlan Wales		(substituted off) 63'
AM	10	Denis Genreau		(substituted off) 46'
LW	19	Marco Tilio
CF	9	Nicholas D'Agostino		(substituted off) 90+2'
Substitutions:
MF	6	Keanu Baccus	(yellow card) 77'	(substituted on) 46'
FW	11	Daniel Arzani		(substituted on) 46'
DF	4	Jay Rich-Baghuelou		(substituted on) 63'
MF	21	Cameron Devlin		(substituted on) 90+2'
MF	15	Caleb Watts		(substituted on) 90+2'
Head coach:
Graham Arnold

GK	1	Mohamed El Shenawy
CB	12	Akram Tawfik	(yellow card) 36'	(substituted off) 90+1'
CB	6	Ahmed Hegazi (c)
CB	20	Ahmed Fatouh
RM	13	Karim El Eraki
CM	4	Osama Galal
CM	18	Mahmoud Hamdy
LM	10	Ramadan Sobhi		(substituted off) 90+1'
RF	9	Taher Mohamed		(substituted off) 79'
CF	14	Ahmed Yasser Rayyan		(substituted off) 79'
LF	7	Salah Mohsen		(substituted off) 61'
Substitutions:
MF	2	Amar Hamdy	(yellow card) 90+3'	(substituted on) 61'
FW	21	Nasser Mansi		(substituted on) 79'
FW	11	Ibrahim Adel		(substituted on) 79'
MF	15	Emam Ashour		(substituted on) 90+1'
MF	8	Nasser Maher		(substituted on) 90+1'
Head coach:
Shawky Gharieb

Assistant referees:
Rui Tavares (Portugal)
Paulo Santos (Portugal)
Fourth official:
Jesús Valenzuela (Venezuela)
Video assistant referee:
Paweł Raczkowski (Poland)
Assistant video assistant referee:
Fu Ming (China PR)

=== Spain vs Argentina ===
28 July 2021
20:00

Spain	1–1	Argentina
Merino 66'	Report (TOCOG); Report (FIFA)	Belmonte 87'

Saitama Stadium 2002, Saitama
Referee: Ismail Elfath (United States)

Spain	Argentina

GK	1	Unai Simón
RB	18	Óscar Gil	(yellow card) 82'	(substituted off) 88'
CB	12	Eric García
CB	4	Pau Torres
LB	3	Marc Cucurella
DM	6	Martín Zubimendi
CM	8	Mikel Merino (c)		(substituted off) 88'
CM	16	Pedri		(substituted off) 74'
AM	19	Dani Olmo		(substituted off) 85'
CF	7	Marco Asensio
CF	11	Mikel Oyarzabal		(substituted off) 74'
Substitutions:
FW	9	Rafa Mir		(substituted on) 74'
MF	14	Carlos Soler		(substituted on) 74'
MF	21	Bryan Gil		(substituted on) 85'
DF	5	Jesús Vallejo		(substituted on) 88'
DF	15	Jon Moncayola		(substituted on) 88'
Head coach:
Luis de la Fuente

GK	1	Jeremías Ledesma
RB	13	Marcelo Herrera
CB	2	Nehuén Pérez (c)	(yellow card) 9'
CB	14	Facundo Medina
LB	3	Claudio Bravo	(yellow card) 81'	(substituted off) 83'
DM	5	Fausto Vera	(yellow card) 53'	(substituted off) 55'
CM	17	Tomás Belmonte
CM	10	Alexis Mac Allister		(substituted off) 55'
RW	7	Agustín Urzi		(substituted off) 70'
LW	11	Ezequiel Barco		(substituted off) 46'
CF	9	Adolfo Gaich
Substitutions:
FW	15	Pedro de la Vega		(substituted on) 46'
MF	16	Martín Payero	(yellow card) 61'	(substituted on) 55'
MF	8	Santiago Colombatto	(yellow card) 58'	(substituted on) 55'
MF	20	Thiago Almada		(substituted on) 70'
DF	6	Leonel Mosevich	(yellow card) 90+2'	(substituted on) 83'
Head coach:
Fernando Batista

Assistant referees:
Corey Parker (United States)
Kyle Atkins (United States)
Fourth official:
Adham Makhadmeh (Jordan)
Video assistant referee:
Chris Penso (United States)
Assistant video assistant referee:
Abdulla Al-Marri (Qatar)

== Discipline ==
Fair play points would have been used as a tiebreaker if the overall and head-to-head records of teams were tied. These were calculated based on yellow and red cards received in all group matches as follows:

- first yellow card: minus 1 point;
- indirect red card (second yellow card): minus 3 points;
- direct red card: minus 4 points;
- yellow card and direct red card: minus 5 points;

Only one of the above deductions is applied to a player in a single match.

Team	Match 1				Match 2				Match 3				Points
Team	Booked	(yellow card) (yellow-red card)	Sent off (straight red)	(yellow card) (red card)	Booked	(yellow card) (yellow-red card)	Sent off (straight red)	(yellow card) (red card)	Booked	(yellow card) (yellow-red card)	Sent off (straight red)	(yellow card) (red card)	Points
Spain					2				1				–3
Egypt	4								2				–6
Australia	7				4				1				–12
Argentina	3	1			4				6				–16
