= Football at the 2020 Summer Olympics – Men's tournament =

2020 Men's Olympic Football Tournament

Tournament details
- Host country: Japan
- Dates: 22 July – 7 August 2021
- Teams: 16 (from 6 confederations)
- Venues: 6 (in 6 host cities)

Final positions
- Champions: Brazil (2nd title)
- Runners-up: Spain
- Third place: Mexico
- Fourth place: Japan

Tournament statistics
- Matches played: 32
- Goals scored: 93 (2.91 per match)
- Attendance: 14,291 (447 per match)
- Top scorer(s): (Brazil) Richarlison (5 goals)

The men's football tournament at the 2020 Summer Olympics was held from 22 July to 7 August 2021. Originally, it was to be held from 23 July to 8 August 2020, but the Summer Olympics were postponed to the following year due to the COVID-19 pandemic. However, the official name of the games remains the 2020 Summer Olympics. It was the 27th edition of the men's Olympic football tournament. Together with the women's competition, the 2020 Summer Olympics football tournament was held at six stadiums in six cities in Japan. The final was hosted at the International Stadium in Yokohama. Teams participating in the men's competition were restricted to under-24 players (born on or after 1 January 1997) with a maximum of three overage players allowed. The men's tournament is typically restricted to under-23 players though following the postponement of the Olympics by a year, FIFA decided to maintain the restriction of players born on or after 1 January 1997.

Brazil were the defending champions and successfully retained their title.

== Schedule ==
The match schedule of the tournament as of 5 December 2018.

Legend
G	Group stage	¼	Quarter-finals	½	Semi-finals	B	Bronze medal match	F	Gold medal match

22 Thu	23 Fri	24 Sat	25 Sun	26 Mon	27 Tue	28 Wed	29 Thu	30 Fri	31 Sat	1 Sun	2 Mon	3 Tue	4 Wed	5 Thu	6 Fri	7 Sat
G			G			G			¼			½			B	F

== Qualification ==
In addition to host nation Japan, 15 men's national teams will qualify from six separate continental confederations. The Organising Committee for FIFA Competitions ratified the distribution of spots at their meeting on 14 September 2017.

Means of qualification	Ref.	Dates^{1}	Venue(s)^{1}	Berth(s)	Qualified
Host nation		—N/a	—N/a	1	Japan
2019 UEFA European Under-21 Championship		16–30 June 2019	Italy; San Marino	4	Spain; Germany; France; Romania
2019 OFC Men's Olympic Qualifying Tournament		21 September – 5 October 2019	Fiji	1	New Zealand
2019 Africa U-23 Cup of Nations		8–22 November 2019	Egypt	3	Egypt; Ivory Coast; South Africa
2020 AFC U-23 Championship		8–26 January 2020	Thailand	3	South Korea; Saudi Arabia; Australia
2020 CONMEBOL Pre-Olympic Tournament		18 January – 9 February 2020	Colombia	2	Argentina; Brazil
2020 CONCACAF Olympic Qualifying Championship		18–30 March 2021	Mexico	2	Mexico; Honduras
Total				16	

- ^1Dates and venues are those of final tournaments (or final round of qualification tournaments), various qualification stages may precede matches at these specific venues.

== Venues ==
Chōfu (Tokyo Area)	Saitama	Yokohama
Tokyo Stadium	Saitama Stadium 2002	International Stadium Yokohama
Capacity: 49,970	Capacity: 63,700	Capacity: 72,327
Kashima	Location of the host cities of the men's football tournament of the 2020 Summer Olympics.	
Ibaraki Kashima Stadium	Location of the host cities of the men's football tournament of the 2020 Summer Olympics.	
Capacity: 37,638	Location of the host cities of the men's football tournament of the 2020 Summer Olympics.	
Rifu	Location of the host cities of the men's football tournament of the 2020 Summer Olympics.	
Miyagi Stadium	Location of the host cities of the men's football tournament of the 2020 Summer Olympics.	
Capacity: 49,133	Location of the host cities of the men's football tournament of the 2020 Summer Olympics.	
Sapporo	Location of the host cities of the men's football tournament of the 2020 Summer Olympics.	
Sapporo Dome	Location of the host cities of the men's football tournament of the 2020 Summer Olympics.	
Capacity: 42,065	Location of the host cities of the men's football tournament of the 2020 Summer Olympics.	

Due to the COVID-19 pandemic in Japan, most matches were played behind closed doors without any spectators, including the final. However, Miyagi Stadium allowed a limited audience to attend matches and Kashima Stadium permitted local schoolchildren as part of the school program but Olympic spectators were still not allowed.

== Squads ==
The men's tournament was an international tournament with restrictions on age: players had to be born on or after 1 January 1997, with three overage players allowed for each squad in the final tournament. Traditionally the roster rules required each team to submit a squad of 18 players, two of whom must be goalkeepers. Each team also named a list of four alternate players, who could replace any player in the squad in case of injury during the tournament. In late June 2021 the International Olympic Committee and FIFA announced that all 22 players of each team would be available for selection before each match. Prior to each match, the teams chose from their total of 22 players, a roster of 18 players to be available for play in that match. The rule change was made in regards to the challenges presented by the COVID-19 pandemic.

== Match officials ==
In June 2020, FIFA approved the use of the video assistant referee (VAR) system for the tournament. The match officials were announced on 23 April 2021.

Match officials
Confederation	Referee	Assistant referees
AFC	Chris Beath (Australia)	Ashley Beecham (Australia); Anton Schetinin (Australia)
AFC	Adham Makhadmeh (Jordan)	Mohammad Al-Kalaf (Jordan); Ahmad Al-Roalle (Jordan)
CAF	Victor Gomes (South Africa)	Souru Phatsoane (Lesotho); Arsenio Marengula (Mozambique)
CAF	Bamlak Tessema Weyesa (Ethiopia)	Mohammed Ibrahim (Sudan); Gilbert Cheruiyot (Kenya)
CONCACAF	Iván Barton (El Salvador)	David Moran (El Salvador); Zachari Zeegelaar (Suriname)
CONCACAF	Ismail Elfath (United States)	Kyle Atkins (United States); Corey Parker (United States)
CONMEBOL	Leodán González (Uruguay)	Nicolás Taran (Uruguay); Richard Trinidad (Uruguay)
CONMEBOL	Kevin Ortega (Peru)	Michael Orué (Peru); Jesús Sánchez (Peru)
CONMEBOL	Jesús Valenzuela (Venezuela)	Tulio Moreno (Venezuela); Lubin Torrealba (Venezuela)
OFC	Matthew Conger (New Zealand)	Tevita Makasini (Tonga); Mark Rule (New Zealand)
UEFA	Orel Grinfeld (Israel)	Roy Hassan (Israel); Idan Yarkoni (Israel)
UEFA	Srđan Jovanović (Serbia)	Uros Stojkovic (Serbia); Milan Mihajlovic (Serbia)
UEFA	Georgi Kabakov (Bulgaria)	Martin Margaritov (Bulgaria); Diyan Valkov (Bulgaria)
UEFA	Artur Soares Dias (Portugal)	Rui Tavares (Portugal); Paulo Santos (Portugal)

Fourth officials
Confederation	Referee
AFC	Hiroyuki Kimura (Japan)
CAF	Dahane Beida (Mauritania)

Video assistant referees
Confederation	Video assistant referee
AFC	Fu Ming (China PR)
AFC	Abdulla Al-Marri (Qatar)
AFC	Muhammad Taqi (Singapore)
CAF	Mahmoud Mohamed Ashour (Egypt)
CAF	Adil Zourak (Morocco)
CONCACAF	Edvin Jurisevic (United States)
CONCACAF	Erick Miranda (Mexico)
CONCACAF	Chris Penso (United States)
CONMEBOL	Andrés Cunha (Uruguay)
CONMEBOL	Nicolás Gallo (Colombia)
CONMEBOL	Wagner Reway (Brazil)
CONMEBOL	Mauro Vigliano (Argentina)
UEFA	Abdulkadir Bitigen (Turkey)
UEFA	Guillermo Cuadra Fernández (Spain)
UEFA	Marco Guida (Italy)
UEFA	Tiago Martins (Portugal)
UEFA	Benoît Millot (France)
UEFA	Paweł Raczkowski (Poland)
UEFA	Roi Reinshreiber (Israel)
UEFA	Bibiana Steinhaus (Germany)

== Draw ==
The draw for the tournament was held on 21 April 2021, 10:00 CEST (UTC+2), at the FIFA headquarters in Zürich, Switzerland. It was conducted by Sarai Bareman, FIFA chief women's football officer, while Samantha Johnson presented the ceremony. Lindsay Tarpley and Ryan Nelsen acted as the draw assistants.

The sixteen teams were drawn into four groups of four teams. The hosts Japan were automatically seeded into Pot 1 and assigned to position A1, while the remaining teams were seeded into their respective pots based on their results in the last five Olympics (more recent tournaments weighted more heavily), with bonus points awarded to confederation champions. No group could contain more than one team from each confederation.

Pot 1	Pot 2	Pot 3	Pot 4
Japan (assigned to A1); Brazil; Argentina; South Korea	Mexico; Germany; Honduras; Spain	Egypt; New Zealand; Ivory Coast; South Africa	Australia; Saudi Arabia; France; Romania

== Group stage ==
The competing countries were divided into four groups of four teams, denoted as groups A, B, C and D. Teams in each group played one another in a round-robin basis with the top two teams of each group advancing to the quarter-finals.

All times are local, JST (UTC+9).

=== Tiebreakers ===
The ranking of teams in the group stage was determined as follows:

1. Points obtained in all group matches (three points for a win, one for a draw, none for a defeat);
2. Goal difference in all group matches;
3. Number of goals scored in all group matches;
4. Points obtained in the matches played between the teams in question;
5. Goal difference in the matches played between the teams in question;
6. Number of goals scored in the matches played between the teams in question;
7. Fair play points in all group matches (only one deduction could be applied to a player in a single match):
  - Yellow card: −1 point;
  - Indirect red card (second yellow card): −3 points;
  - Direct red card: −4 points;
  - Yellow card and direct red card: −5 points;
8. Drawing of lots.

=== Group A ===
Pos	Team	Pld	W	D	L	GF	GA	GD	Pts	Qualification
1	Japan (H)	3	3	0	0	7	1	+6	9	Advance to knockout stage
2	Mexico	3	2	0	1	8	3	+5	6	Advance to knockout stage
3	France	3	1	0	2	5	11	−6	3	
4	South Africa	3	0	0	3	3	8	−5	0	

Source: TOCOG and FIFA
(H) Hosts
22 July 2021
17:00

Mexico	4–1	France
Vega 47'; Córdova 55'; Antuna 80'; Aguirre 90+1'	Report (TOCOG); Report (FIFA)	Gignac 69' (pen.)

Tokyo Stadium, Chōfu
Referee: Chris Beath (Australia)
22 July 2021
20:00

Japan	1–0	South Africa
Kubo 71'	Report (TOCOG); Report (FIFA)

Tokyo Stadium, Chōfu
Referee: Jesús Valenzuela (Venezuela)

25 July 2021
17:00

France	4–3	South Africa
Gignac 57', 78', 86' (pen.); Savanier 90+2'	Report (TOCOG); Report (FIFA)	Kodisang 53'; Makgopa 73'; Mokoena 82'

Saitama Stadium 2002, Saitama
Referee: Kevin Ortega (Peru)
25 July 2021
20:00

Japan	2–1	Mexico
Kubo 6'; Dōan 11' (pen.)	Report (TOCOG); Report (FIFA)	Alvarado 85'

Saitama Stadium 2002, Saitama
Referee: Artur Soares Dias (Portugal)

28 July 2021
20:30

France	0–4	Japan
	Report (TOCOG); Report (FIFA)	Kubo 27'; Sakai 34'; Miyoshi 70'; Maeda 90+1'

International Stadium Yokohama, Yokohama
Referee: Iván Barton (El Salvador)
28 July 2021
20:30

South Africa	0–3	Mexico
	Report (TOCOG); Report (FIFA)	Vega 18'; Romo 45+1'; Martín 60'

Sapporo Dome, Sapporo
Referee: Matthew Conger (New Zealand)

=== Group B ===
Pos	Team	Pld	W	D	L	GF	GA	GD	Pts	Qualification
1	South Korea	3	2	0	1	10	1	+9	6	Advance to knockout stage
2	New Zealand	3	1	1	1	3	3	0	4	Advance to knockout stage
3	Romania	3	1	1	1	1	4	−3	4	
4	Honduras	3	1	0	2	3	9	−6	3	

Source: TOCOG and FIFA
22 July 2021
17:00

New Zealand	1–0	South Korea
Wood 70'	Report (TOCOG); Report (FIFA)

Kashima Stadium, Kashima
Referee: Victor Gomes (South Africa)
22 July 2021
20:00

Honduras	0–1	Romania
	Report (TOCOG); Report (FIFA)	Oliva 45+1' (o.g.)

Kashima Stadium, Kashima
Referee: Leodán González (Uruguay)

25 July 2021
17:00

New Zealand	2–3	Honduras
Cacace 10'; Wood 49'	Report (TOCOG); Report (FIFA)	Palma 45+1'; Obregón 78'; Rivas 87'

Kashima Stadium, Kashima
Referee: Orel Grinfeld (Israel)
25 July 2021
20:00

Romania	0–4	South Korea
	Report (TOCOG); Report (FIFA)	Marin 27' (o.g.); Um Won-sang 59'; Lee Kang-in 84' (pen.), 90'

Kashima Stadium, Kashima
Referee: Jesús Valenzuela (Venezuela)

28 July 2021
17:30

Romania	0–0	New Zealand
	Report (TOCOG); Report (FIFA)

Sapporo Dome, Sapporo
Referee: Kevin Ortega (Peru)
28 July 2021
17:30

South Korea	6–0	Honduras
Hwang Ui-jo 12' (pen.), 45+5', 52' (pen.); Won Du-jae 19' (pen.); Kim Jin-ya 64'; Lee Kang-in 82'	Report (TOCOG); Report (FIFA)

International Stadium Yokohama, Yokohama
Referee: Georgi Kabakov (Bulgaria)

=== Group C ===
Pos	Team	Pld	W	D	L	GF	GA	GD	Pts	Qualification
1	Spain	3	1	2	0	2	1	+1	5	Advance to knockout stage
2	Egypt	3	1	1	1	2	1	+1	4	Advance to knockout stage
3	Argentina	3	1	1	1	2	3	−1	4	
4	Australia	3	1	0	2	2	3	−1	3	

Source: TOCOG and FIFA
22 July 2021
16:30

Egypt	0–0	Spain
	Report (TOCOG); Report (FIFA)

Sapporo Dome, Sapporo
Referee: Adham Makhadmeh (Jordan)
22 July 2021
19:30

Argentina	0–2	Australia
	Report (TOCOG); Report (FIFA)	Wales 14'; Tilio 80'

Sapporo Dome, Sapporo
Referee: Srđan Jovanović (Serbia)

25 July 2021
16:30

Egypt	0–1	Argentina
	Report (TOCOG); Report (FIFA)	Medina 52'

Sapporo Dome, Sapporo
Referee: Georgi Kabakov (Bulgaria)
25 July 2021
19:30

Australia	0–1	Spain
	Report (TOCOG); Report (FIFA)	Oyarzabal 81'

Sapporo Dome, Sapporo
Referee: Bamlak Tessema Weyesa (Ethiopia)

28 July 2021
20:00

Australia	0–2	Egypt
	Report (TOCOG); Report (FIFA)	Rayyan 44'; A. Hamdy 85'

Miyagi Stadium, Rifu
Attendance: 4,471
Referee: Artur Soares Dias (Portugal)
28 July 2021
20:00

Spain	1–1	Argentina
Merino 66'	Report (TOCOG); Report (FIFA)	Belmonte 87'

Saitama Stadium 2002, Saitama
Referee: Ismail Elfath (United States)

=== Group D ===
Pos	Team	Pld	W	D	L	GF	GA	GD	Pts	Qualification
1	Brazil	3	2	1	0	7	3	+4	7	Advance to knockout stage
2	Ivory Coast	3	1	2	0	3	2	+1	5	Advance to knockout stage
3	Germany	3	1	1	1	6	7	−1	4	
4	Saudi Arabia	3	0	0	3	4	8	−4	0	

Source: TOCOG and FIFA
22 July 2021
17:30

Ivory Coast	2–1	Saudi Arabia
Al-Amri 39' (o.g.); Kessié 66'	Report (TOCOG); Report (FIFA)	Al-Dawsari 44'

International Stadium Yokohama, Yokohama
Referee: Matthew Conger (New Zealand)
22 July 2021
20:30

Brazil	4–2	Germany
Richarlison 7', 22', 30'; Paulinho 90+5'	Report (TOCOG); Report (FIFA)	Amiri 57'; Ache 84'

International Stadium Yokohama, Yokohama
Referee: Iván Barton (El Salvador)

25 July 2021
17:30

Brazil	0–0	Ivory Coast
	Report (TOCOG); Report (FIFA)

International Stadium Yokohama, Yokohama
Referee: Ismail Elfath (United States)
25 July 2021
20:30

Saudi Arabia	2–3	Germany
Al-Najei 30', 50'	Report (TOCOG); Report (FIFA)	Amiri 11'; Ache 43'; Uduokhai 75'

International Stadium Yokohama, Yokohama
Referee: Victor Gomes (South Africa)

28 July 2021
17:00

Saudi Arabia	1–3	Brazil
Al-Amri 27'	Report (TOCOG); Report (FIFA)	Cunha 14'; Richarlison 76', 90+3'

Saitama Stadium 2002, Saitama
Referee: Bamlak Tessema Weyesa (Ethiopia)
28 July 2021
17:00

Germany	1–1	Ivory Coast
Löwen 73'	Report (TOCOG); Report (FIFA)	Henrichs 67' (o.g.)

Miyagi Stadium, Rifu
Attendance: 4,294
Referee: Leodán González (Uruguay)

== Knockout stage ==
In the knockout stage, if a match was level at the end of normal playing time, extra time was played (two periods of 15 minutes each) and followed, if necessary, by a penalty shoot-out to determine the winner.

=== Bracket ===
Quarter-finals
31 July – Yokohama
South Korea	3
Mexico	6
31 July – Saitama
Brazil	1
Egypt	0
31 July – Kashima
Japan (p)	0 (4)
New Zealand	0 (2)
31 July – Rifu
Spain (a.e.t.)	5
Ivory Coast	2

Semi-finals
3 August – Kashima
Mexico	0 (1)
Brazil (p)	0 (4)
3 August – Saitama
Japan	0
Spain (a.e.t.)	1

Gold medal match
7 August – Yokohama
Brazil (a.e.t.)	2
Spain	1
Bronze medal match
6 August – Saitama
Mexico	3
Japan	1

=== Quarter-finals ===
31 July 2021
17:00

Spain	5–2 (a.e.t.)	Ivory Coast
Olmo 30'; Mir 90+3', 117', 120+1'; Oyarzabal 98' (pen.)	Report (TOCOG); Report (FIFA)	Bailly 10'; Gradel 90+1'

Miyagi Stadium, Rifu
Attendance: 5,526
Referee: Jesús Valenzuela (Venezuela)

31 July 2021
18:00

Japan	0–0 (a.e.t.)	New Zealand
	Report (TOCOG); Report (FIFA)
Penalties
Ueda (penalty scored); Itakura (penalty scored); Nakayama (penalty scored); Yoshida (penalty scored)	4–2	(penalty scored) Wood; (penalty missed) Cacace; (penalty missed) Lewis; (penalty scored) McCowatt

Kashima Stadium, Kashima
Referee: Ismail Elfath (United States)

31 July 2021
19:00

Brazil	1–0	Egypt
Cunha 37'	Report (TOCOG); Report (FIFA)

Saitama Stadium 2002, Saitama
Referee: Chris Beath (Australia)

31 July 2021
20:00

South Korea	3–6	Mexico
Lee Dong-gyeong 20', 51'; Hwang Ui-jo 90+1'	Report (TOCOG); Report (FIFA)	Martín 12', 54'; Romo 30'; Córdova 39' (pen.), 63'; Aguirre 84'

International Stadium Yokohama, Yokohama
Referee: Orel Grinfeld (Israel)

=== Semi-finals ===
3 August 2021
17:00

Mexico	0–0 (a.e.t.)	Brazil
	Report (TOCOG); Report (FIFA)
Penalties
Aguirre (penalty missed); Vásquez (penalty missed); Rodríguez (penalty scored)	1–4	(penalty scored) Dani Alves; (penalty scored) Martinelli; (penalty scored) Guimarães; (penalty scored) Reinier

Kashima Stadium, Kashima
Referee: Georgi Kabakov (Bulgaria)

3 August 2021
20:00

Japan	0–1 (a.e.t.)	Spain
	Report (TOCOG); Report (FIFA)	Asensio 115'

Saitama Stadium 2002, Saitama
Referee: Kevin Ortega (Peru)

=== Bronze medal match ===
6 August 2021
18:00

Mexico	3–1	Japan
Córdova 13' (pen.); Vásquez 22'; Vega 58'	Report (TOCOG); Report (FIFA)	Mitoma 78'

Saitama Stadium 2002, Saitama
Referee: Bamlak Tessema Weyesa (Ethiopia)

=== Gold medal match ===
7 August 2021
20:30

Brazil	2–1 (a.e.t.)	Spain
Cunha 45+2'; Malcom 108'	Report (TOCOG); Report (FIFA)	Oyarzabal 61'

International Stadium Yokohama, Yokohama
Attendance: 0 (Note: Played behind closed doors due to the COVID-19 pandemic in Japan)
Referee: Chris Beath (Australia)

== Statistics ==
=== Goalscorers ===
There were 93 goals scored in 32 matches, for an average of 2.91 goals per match.

5 goals

- (Brazil) Richarlison

4 goals

- (France) André-Pierre Gignac
- (Mexico) Sebastián Córdova
- (South Korea) Hwang Ui-jo

3 goals

- (Brazil) Matheus Cunha
- (Japan) Takefusa Kubo
- (Mexico) Henry Martín
- (Mexico) Alexis Vega
- (South Korea) Lee Kang-in
- (Spain) Rafa Mir
- (Spain) Mikel Oyarzabal

2 goals

- (Germany) Ragnar Ache
- (Germany) Nadiem Amiri
- (Mexico) Eduardo Aguirre
- (Mexico) Luis Romo
- (New Zealand) Chris Wood
- (Saudi Arabia) Sami Al-Najei
- (South Korea) Lee Dong-gyeong

1 goal

- (Argentina) Tomás Belmonte
- (Argentina) Facundo Medina
- (Australia) Marco Tilio
- (Australia) Lachlan Wales
- (Brazil) Malcom
- (Brazil) Paulinho
- (Egypt) Amar Hamdy
- (Egypt) Ahmed Yasser Rayyan
- (France) Téji Savanier
- (Germany) Eduard Löwen
- (Germany) Felix Uduokhai
- (Honduras) Juan Carlos Obregón Jr.
- (Honduras) Luis Palma
- (Honduras) Rigoberto Rivas
- (Ivory Coast) Eric Bailly
- (Ivory Coast) Max Gradel
- (Ivory Coast) Franck Kessié
- (Japan) Ritsu Dōan
- (Japan) Daizen Maeda
- (Japan) Kaoru Mitoma
- (Japan) Koji Miyoshi
- (Japan) Hiroki Sakai
- (Mexico) Roberto Alvarado
- (Mexico) Uriel Antuna
- (Mexico) Johan Vásquez
- (New Zealand) Liberato Cacace
- (Saudi Arabia) Abdulelah Al-Amri
- (Saudi Arabia) Salem Al-Dawsari
- (South Africa) Kobamelo Kodisang
- (South Africa) Evidence Makgopa
- (South Africa) Teboho Mokoena
- (South Korea) Kim Jin-ya
- (South Korea) Um Won-sang
- (South Korea) Won Du-jae
- (Spain) Marco Asensio
- (Spain) Mikel Merino
- (Spain) Dani Olmo

1 own goal

- (Germany) Benjamin Henrichs (against Ivory Coast)
- (Honduras) Elvin Oliva (against Romania)
- (Romania) Marius Marin (against South Korea)
- (Saudi Arabia) Abdulelah Al-Amri (against Ivory Coast)

Source: FIFA

== Final ranking ==
As per statistical convention in football, matches decided in extra time are counted as wins and losses, while matches decided by penalty shoot-outs are counted as draws.

Pos	Team	Pld	W	D	L	GF	GA	GD	Pts	Final result
1	Brazil	6	4	2	0	10	4	+6	14	Gold medal
2	Spain	6	3	2	1	9	5	+4	11	Silver medal
3	Mexico	6	4	1	1	17	7	+10	13	Bronze medal
4	Japan (H)	6	3	1	2	8	5	+3	10	Fourth place
5	South Korea	4	2	0	2	13	7	+6	6	Eliminated in quarter-finals
6	New Zealand	4	1	2	1	3	3	0	5	Eliminated in quarter-finals
7	Ivory Coast	4	1	2	1	5	7	−2	5	Eliminated in quarter-finals
8	Egypt	4	1	1	2	2	2	0	4	Eliminated in quarter-finals
9	Germany	3	1	1	1	6	7	−1	4	Eliminated in group stage
10	Argentina	3	1	1	1	2	3	−1	4	Eliminated in group stage
11	Romania	3	1	1	1	1	4	−3	4	Eliminated in group stage
12	Australia	3	1	0	2	2	3	−1	3	Eliminated in group stage
13	France	3	1	0	2	5	11	−6	3	Eliminated in group stage
14	Honduras	3	1	0	2	3	9	−6	3	Eliminated in group stage
15	Saudi Arabia	3	0	0	3	4	8	−4	0	Eliminated in group stage
16	South Africa	3	0	0	3	3	8	−5	0	Eliminated in group stage

Source: TOCOG
(H) Hosts
