= Zeegelaar =

Zeegelaar is a surname. Notable people with the surname include:

- Marvin Zeegelaar (born 1990), Dutch footballer
- Zachari Zeegelaar (born 1989), Surinamese football assistant referee
