= Zachari Zeegelaar =

Surinamese football referee (born 1989)

- Born: 3 October 1989 (age 37); Paramaribo, Suriname

Domestic
Years	League	Role
2013–present	Suriname Major League	Assistant referee

International
Years	League	Role
2013–present	FIFA listed	Assistant referee

Zachari Zeegelaar (born 3 October 1989) is a Surinamese football assistant referee and former professional player who has been on the FIFA International Referees List since 2014. Zeegelaar has taken part in the Summer Olympics and a FIFA World Cup.

== Early life ==
Zeegelaar was born at Diakonessenhuis in Paramaribo to Carmen Sordjo and Orlando Zeegelaar, both deceased. He spent much of his childhood in Zanderij and was raised, along with his two sisters, Raquel and Chawila, by his mother alone, which he is proud of. Raquel has played for the club S.V. Transvaal and the Suriname women's national football team.

== Career ==
Zeegelaar was part of the Transvaal team, playing for a club in Lelydorp, but his mother forced him to stop when he was 16 because he had poor grades at school. At the age of 21, he moved back to Paramaribo to play football. After he was shown a red card during a match, he spoke to the referee, who said that Zeegelaar understood the rules and should take a refereeing course. He enrolled in a Surinamese Football Association referee course when he was 23. After earning his FIFA badge as an assistant referee in 2014, Zeegelaar officiated in the Suriname President's Cup and the US tournament Dallas Cup. He worked with pitch referee Enrico Wijngaarde, one of the most internationally recognized referees from Suriname. Zeegelar has taken part in four editions of the CONCACAF Gold Cup, including the tournament of 2025.

In 2022, Zeegelaar was appointed as an assistant referee for the 2022 FIFA World Cup in Qatar, officiating two group stage matches under lead referee Iván Barton of El Salvador: Germany vs Japan for Group E and Brazil vs Switzerland for Group G. He served in two matches in 2020 to the Summer Olympics in Tokyo for the men's football tournament.

== Selected performances ==
2020 Sumer Olympics – Men's tournament – Tokyo
Date	Match	Result	Round	Venue	Source
22 July 2021	Brazil – Germany	4–2	Group stage	Nissan Stadium, Yokohama	
28 July 2021	France – Japan	0–4	Group stage	Nissan Stadium, Yokohama	
2022 FIFA World Cup – Qatar
23 November 2022	Germany – Japan	1–2	Group stage	Khalifa International Stadium, Al Rayyan	
28 November 2022	Brazil – Switzerland	1–0	Group stage	Stadium 974, Doha	
