= Gabriel Martinelli =

Brazilian footballer (born 2001)

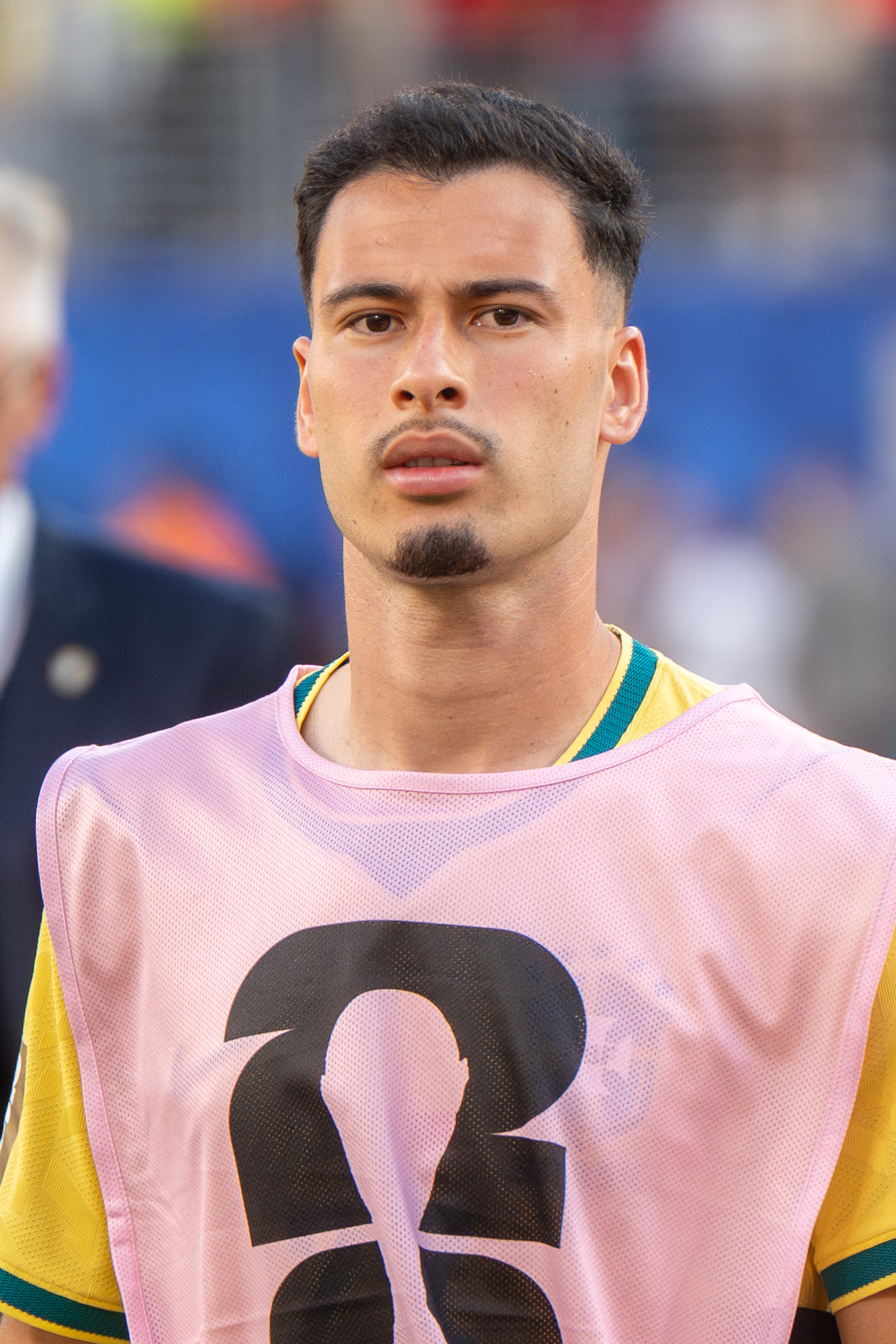
- Martinelli with Brazil in 2026

Personal information
- Full name: Gabriel Teodoro Martinelli Silva
- Date of birth: 18 June 2001 (age 25)
- Place of birth: Guarulhos, São Paulo, Brazil
- Height: 1.78 m (5 ft 10 in)
- Positions: Forward; left winger

Team information
- Current team: Al-Hilal
- Number: 7

Youth career
- 2010–2014: Corinthians
- 2014–2018: Ituano

Senior career*
Years	Team	Apps	(Gls)
2018–2019	Ituano	17	(6)
2019–2026	Arsenal	191	(41)
2026–	Al-Hilal	6	(6)

International career^{‡}
2019–2020	Brazil U23	7	(1)
2022–	Brazil	27	(5)
Medal record
Men's football
Representing Brazil
Olympic Games
Gold medal – first place	2020	Team
- * Club domestic league appearances and goals as of 22:03, 23 October 2026 (UTC) ‡ National team caps and goals as of 5 July 2026 (UTC)

Gabriel Teodoro Martinelli Silva (Brazilian Portuguese: [ɡabɾiˈɛw maʁtʃiˈnɛli]; born 18 June 2001) is a Brazilian professional footballer who plays as a forward or left winger for Saudi Pro League club Al-Hilal and the Brazil national team.

Martinelli began his senior career playing for Ituano and signed for Premier League club Arsenal in 2019 for a transfer fee of £6 million, where he won the Premier League, the FA Cup, and the FA Community Shield. In 2026, Martinelli joined Al-Hilal for a fee of £60 million.

Martinelli represented Brazil at the 2020 Summer Olympics, winning an Olympic Gold in men's football. He made his senior debut for Brazil in 2022 and has played at the 2022 FIFA World Cup, 2024 Copa América and 2026 World Cup.

== Club career ==
=== Early career ===
Born in Guarulhos, São Paulo, Martinelli started his career in 2010, playing for Corinthians' futsal team. After making the breakthrough in football fields, he moved to Ituano in 2015, having subsequent trials at Manchester United and Barcelona.

On 4 November 2017, Martinelli signed his first professional contract until October 2022. He made his professional debut the following 17 March, coming on as a late substitute for goalscorer Claudinho in a 2–1 Campeonato Paulista away win against São Bento; at the age of 16 years and nine months, he became the youngest player to play for the club in the century.

Martinelli scored his first senior goal on 8 September 2018, netting the second in a 4–1 win over Taboão da Serra, for the year's Copa Paulista. Definitively promoted to the first team for the 2019 Campeonato Paulista, he scored six goals during the competition, being the club's top goalscorer as they reached the quarterfinals; highlights included a brace in a 3–0 away win against Bragantino on 15 March 2019.

=== Arsenal ===
==== 2019–2020: Debut season and FA Cup win ====
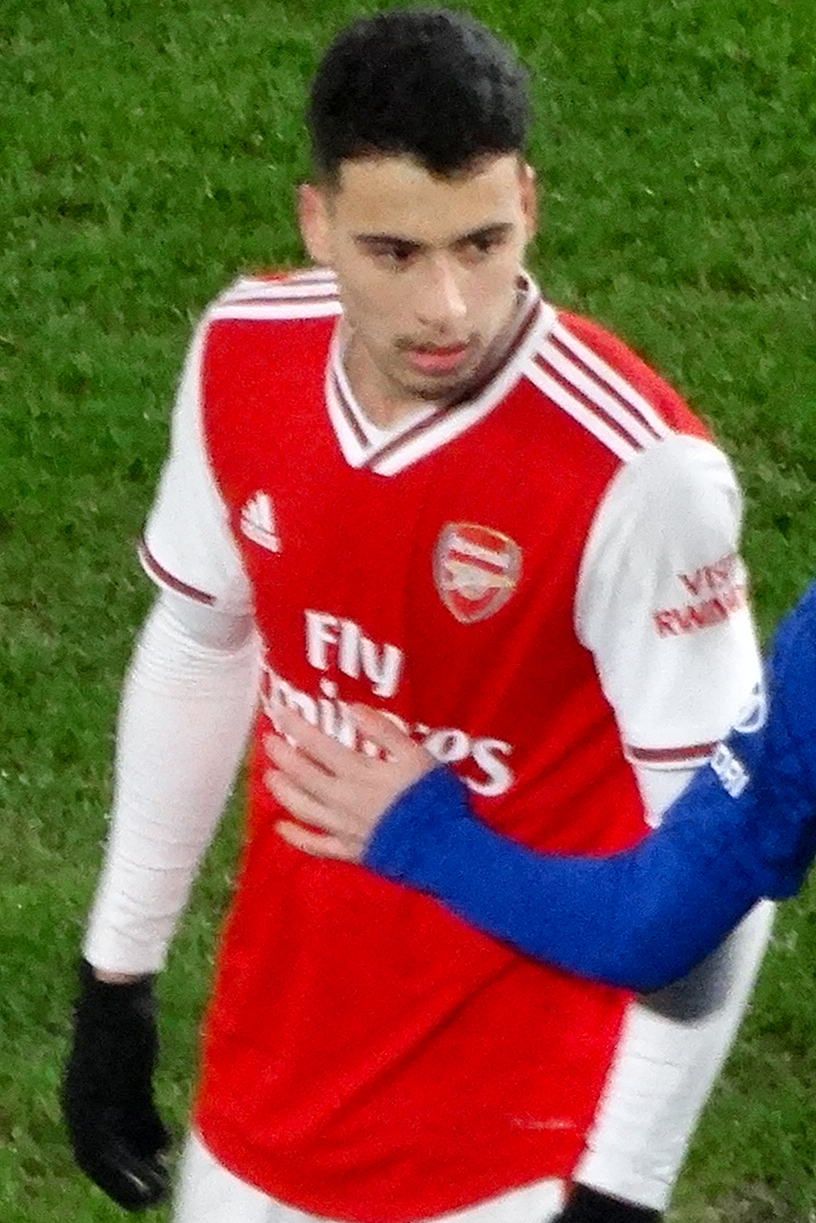
Martinelli playing for Arsenal in 2020

Martinelli was reportedly subject to interest from a number of clubs but signed a long-term contract with Premier League club Arsenal on 2 July 2019, for a reported fee of £6 million (R$46.9 million). Holding an Italian passport, Martinelli was not subject to the scrutinised criteria required for English clubs to sign South American players. He travelled with the Arsenal first team to their pre-season tour in the United States. He scored a goal on his non-competitive debut, in a 3–0 pre-season win against Colorado Rapids on 16 July. Upon signing, Martinelli was originally set to play primarily with the under-21s in his first season, then slowly be integrated from the academy setup to the first-team; however, Martinelli's impressive pre-season and quality in training encouraged Arsenal that he would be ready for immediate first-team integration.

Martinelli made his Premier League debut on 11 August 2019 in a 1–0 win against Newcastle United, coming on in the 84th minute as a substitute for Henrikh Mkhitaryan. On 24 September, Martinelli scored a brace in his first competitive start for the club in a 5–0 victory over Championship side Nottingham Forest in the EFL Cup. His performance received praise from head coach Unai Emery, who said: "He's hungry to have that opportunity to help us, he is very humble, he fights. I told him to have some patience for his opportunity to do like he was doing. He did that. He deserved it".

Martinelli made his second start for Arsenal in a 4–0 home win over Standard Liège in the UEFA Europa League on 4 October, in which he scored another brace. Martinelli kept up his goal scoring form, netting the equaliser in a 3–2 home win over Vitória Guimarães on 24 October, with another header. In the League Cup fourth round on 30 October, Martinelli registered another brace in a 5–5 draw with Liverpool, and also scored his penalty in the penalty shootout, which Arsenal eventually lost. As a result, he became the first player to score four times in his first four starts since Ian Wright. Martinelli's performance received praise from Liverpool manager Jürgen Klopp, who labelled him "[the] talent of the century".

Martinelli's performances led to him being awarded the Arsenal 'Player of the Month' award for October, receiving 75% of the total votes cast, beating out Mattéo Guendouzi and Nicolas Pépé. After the appointment of interim head coach Freddie Ljungberg, Martinelli started his first Premier League game, scoring Arsenal's equaliser in an eventual 1–3 win over West Ham United on 9 December. On 21 January 2020, Martinelli scored in a 2–2 away draw at Chelsea, making him the first teenager to reach double figures in a season for Arsenal since Nicolas Anelka. Picking the ball up outside the Arsenal box following a headed clearance from a corner, Martinelli ran the length of the pitch outpacing Chelsea defenders to slot past Kepa Arrizabalaga. The goal was later voted as Arsenal's Goal of the Season by the club's fans. On 3 July, Martinelli signed a new four-year contract, with a team option for an extra year, until 2025. Shortly after, Martinelli was ruled out until the end of 2020, undergoing surgery to repair a lesion in the cartilage of his knee following an injury in training on 21 June.

==== 2020–2022: Return to fitness and position change ====
Martinelli made his return on 19 December, coming off the bench to play 19 minutes in a 2–1 away defeat to Everton. During the warmup against Newcastle United in the FA Cup on 9 January 2021, he sustained a minor ankle injury and was replaced in the line-up by Reiss Nelson. Martinelli returned to playing in European competition on 18 February, making a 13-minute cameo appearance off the bench in a 1–1 draw against Benfica. He scored his first goal of the season in a 3–0 away victory against Sheffield United on 11 April. While previously playing in central positions akin to a classic number 9, under Mikel Arteta's tutelage, Martinelli was moulded to play more on the left-wing where he had more purchase to cut onto his strong right foot & use his rapid dribbling to unnerve defenders.

Martinelli missed pre-season after being selected on international duty in Brazil's winning Olympic Gold campaign. Martinelli scored his first goal (a volley with his second touch of the game) of the 2021–22 season against Newcastle United on 27 November. This goal of his was eventually ranked 3rd in the official Goal of the Season poll held by the club at the end of the season. On 18 December, he scored twice against Leeds United three days later, marking his first Premier League brace, with his first goal marking Arsenal's 7,000th scored in top-division English football. On 10 February 2022, Martinelli was sent off for two yellow cards in the space of four seconds against Wolves. It was his first red card in his career. The red card gained some controversy as he was given two yellow cards in one passage of play, starting with pushing Daniel Podence after a throw in and then a foul against Nélson Semedo.

Before the conclusion of the 2021–22 season, Martinelli was handed the number 11 shirt pending the departure of Lucas Torreira to Galatasaray in the summer transfer window. His former number 35 was later taken up by Oleksandr Zinchenko upon the latter's arrival.

==== 2022–2026: Premier League win, goalscoring efforts and departure ====
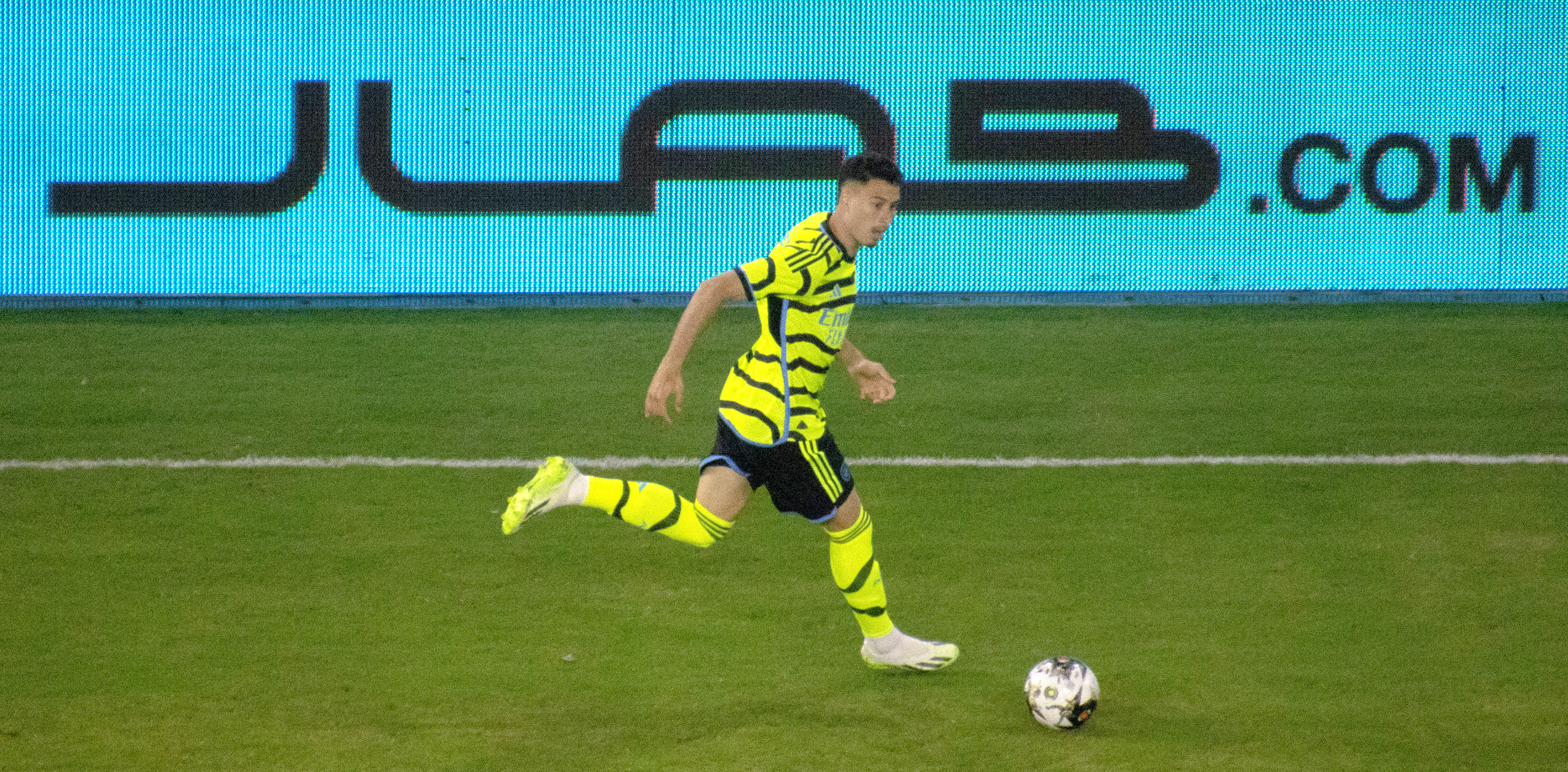
Martinelli playing for Arsenal in the 2023 MLS All-Star Game

On 5 August 2022, Martinelli scored for Arsenal in their 2–0 away win at Crystal Palace, becoming the first Brazilian to net a season-opening goal of a Premier League campaign. On 31 August, Martinelli scored a 77th minute winner in a home match against Aston Villa, which gave Arsenal five wins from their opening five matches of the season. On 1 October, Martinelli provided an assist for Granit Xhaka in Arsenal's 3–1 victory over North London rivals Tottenham Hotspur. One week later on 9 October, he opened the scoring within 58 seconds in Arsenal's home match against Liverpool, which the Gunners would go on to win 3–2, and was awarded Man of the Match for his display. On Boxing Day, Martinelli scored in Arsenal's first Premier League match since the conclusion of the 2022 FIFA World Cup, a 3–1 win over West Ham.

On 3 February 2023, Martinelli signed a new long-term contract with the club, tying him down until 2027. On 25 February, Martinelli scored the only goal of the game in an away win over Leicester City. In Arsenal's next match against Everton on 1 March, Martinelli netted a brace as Arsenal ran out 4–0 winners and moved five points clear at the top of the Premier League table. By the end of the season, Martinelli had scored 15 goals and provided 6 assists in all competitions, becoming the club's joint-top scorer for the season alongside Martin Ødegaard, and finished third in Arsenal's Player of the Season vote. Martinelli also became the highest scoring Brazilian player in a single Premier League season, equalling Roberto Firmino's record for Liverpool in the 2017–18 season.

On 12 August 2023, in Arsenal's first match of the 2023–24 Premier League season, Martinelli assisted Eddie Nketiah by pirouetting past Serge Aurier & Danilo Oliveira in a 2–1 home win against Nottingham Forest. On 3 September, Martinelli provided the assist for Martin Ødegaard's equaliser against Manchester United, just 35 seconds after going 1–0 down. Arsenal would later seal a 3–1 victory. On 8 October, Martinelli came on as a substitute and scored the only goal of the game in a 1–0 victory over Manchester City with the help of a deflection off defender Nathan Aké, as Arsenal sealed their first league win against their opponents since 2015. On 24 October, he made his Champions League debut, in which he scored the first goal in a 2–1 away win against Sevilla. On 4 February 2024, Martinelli scored as Arsenal defeated Liverpool 3–1, taking advantage of an error from Liverpool’s defense.

On 10 November 2024, Martinelli scored the opening goal as Arsenal drew 1–1 with Chelsea. On 16 April 2025, in the second leg of the UEFA Champions League quarter-finals, Martinelli scored a late winner as Arsenal defeated Real Madrid 2–1 at the Santiago Bernabéu, securing a 5–1 aggregate victory. On 11 May 2025, he scored a header at Anfield to help Arsenal come back from 2–0 down, with the match ending 2–2 against Liverpool. Despite Arsenal signing new attacking additions before the 2025–26 Premier League season, including Noni Madueke and Eberechi Eze, Martinelli enjoyed a resurgence in his new role. On 21 September, he came off the bench to score a late equaliser in a 1–1 Premier League draw against Manchester City. On 21 October, he scored against Atlético Madrid in a 4–0 Champions League win. On 26 November, Martinelli scored in a 3–1 Champions League win over Bayern Munich. By scoring in a 3–0 away victory against Club Brugge in the Champions League on 10 December, Martinelli became the first Arsenal player to score in 5 consecutive Champions League matches. On 11 January 2026, Martinelli scored the first hat-trick of his career in a 4–1 FA Cup win at Portsmouth.

=== Al-Hilal ===
On 3 September 2026, Martinelli joined Saudi Pro League club Al-Hilal in a transfer worth £60 million, becoming Arsenal's record sale, beating Alex Oxlade-Chamberlain's £35 million transfer to Liverpool in 2017. He signed a four-year contract worth a reported £17.2 million a season. Martinelli made his Al-Hilal debut one day later, coming off the bench in a 0–2 away victory against Al Shabab. He scored his first club goal, and registered his first Al-Hilal hat-trick, in a 0–6 away victory against Al Taawoun on 12 September.

== International career ==
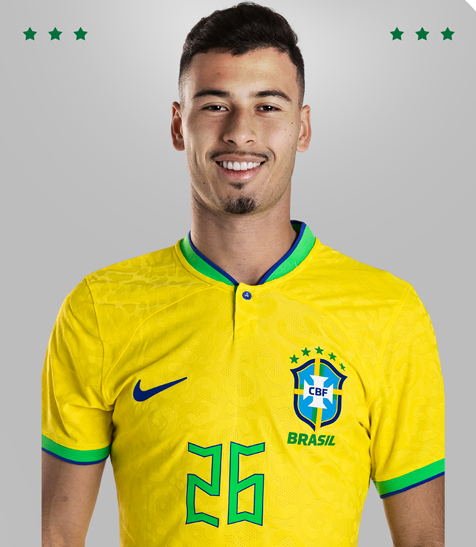
Martinelli with Brazil in 2023

On 20 May 2019, Martinelli was called up by Brazil national team manager Tite to complete preparatory training for the 2019 Copa América. In November 2019, Martinelli appeared for Brazil's under-23 side at the United International Football Festival in Spain.

On 2 July 2021, Martinelli was named in the Brazil squad for the 2020 Summer Olympics. On 3 August, Martinelli scored Brazil's second penalty to help defeat Mexico in the Olympic semi-final, before becoming a gold medallist after Brazil defeated Spain in the final four days later. He was named in the 25-man senior Brazil squad on 11 March 2022 for the 2022 FIFA World Cup qualifiers against Chile and Bolivia. Martinelli made his international debut when he came off the bench for Vinícius Júnior in Brazil's 4–0 win over Chile at the Maracana Stadium.

On 7 November 2022, Martinelli was named in the squad for the 2022 FIFA World Cup, making his World Cup debut coming on as a substitute for Raphinha in the 87th minute of Brazil's opening 2–0 victory against Serbia. Martinelli would be an unused substitute in Brazil's 1–0 victory over Switzerland, and would play the full match in Brazil's 1–0 defeat to Cameroon. Martinelli was involved in Brazil's 4–1 victory over South Korea in the round of 16, coming on as a substitute for Vinícius Júnior in the 72nd minute, and was an unused substitute in Brazil's quarter-final match against Croatia, which Brazil would lose 4–2 on penalties after a 1–1 draw.

On 16 November 2023, Martinelli scored his first goal for Brazil in a 2–1 defeat against Colombia in 2026 World Cup qualification. He scored his second Brazil goal in a 2–3 away victory in a 2024 Copa América pre-tournament preparation match against Mexico at Kyle Field on 8 June 2024. On 14 October 2025, he scored his third international goal in a 3–2 friendly away loss against Japan in Tokyo. On 31 March 2026, Martinelli scored his fourth international goal in a friendly against Croatia, scoring Brazil's third in a 3–1 victory at Camping World Stadium.

On 18 May 2026, Martinelli was selected for Brazil's squad for the 2026 FIFA World Cup. On 29 June 2026, he scored his fifth international goal for Brazil in the round of 32, netting a last-minute winner in a 2–1 victory against Japan.

== Style of play ==
Martinelli is a dynamic and explosive wide forward, and is known for his acceleration, speed and defensive intensity.

== Personal life ==
Martinelli was born in Brazil, and is of Italian descent through his father; he holds dual Brazilian-Italian citizenship.

Martinelli has been in a relationship with Isabella Rousso since at least 2023. In March 2025, they announced their engagement, and they married in July 2026.

== Career statistics ==
=== Club ===
As of match played 23 October 2026

Appearances and goals by club, season and competition
Club	Season	League			State league (Note: Includes Campeonato Paulista)		National cup (Note: Includes FA Cup, King's Cup)		League cup (Note: Includes EFL Cup)		Continental		Other		Total	
Club	Season	Division	Apps	Goals	Apps	Goals	Apps	Goals	Apps	Goals	Apps	Goals	Apps	Goals	Apps	Goals
Ituano	2018	—			3	0	—		—		—		17 (Note: Appearances in Copa Paulista)	4	20	4
Ituano	2019	Série D	0	0	14	6	—		—		—		—		14	6
Ituano	Total		0	0	17	6	—		—		—		17	4	34	10
Arsenal	2019–20	Premier League	14	3	—		3	0	2	4	7 (Note: Appearances in UEFA Europa League)	3	—		26	10
Arsenal	2020–21	Premier League	14	2	—		1	0	1	0	6	0	0	0	22	2
Arsenal	2021–22	Premier League	29	6	—		1	0	6	0	—		—		36	6
Arsenal	2022–23	Premier League	36	15	—		2	0	1	0	7	0	—		46	15
Arsenal	2023–24	Premier League	35	6	—		1	0	1	0	6 (Note: Appearances in UEFA Champions League)	2	1 (Note: Appearance in FA Community Shield)	0	44	8
Arsenal	2024–25	Premier League	33	8	—		1	0	4	0	13	2	—		51	10
Arsenal	2025–26	Premier League	30	1	—		4	4	5	0	14	6	—		53	11
Arsenal	Total		191	41	—		13	4	20	4	53	13	1	0	278	62
Arsenal U21	2020–21	—			—		—		—		—		1 (Note: Appearance in EFL Trophy)	0	1	0
Al-Hilal	2026–27	Saudi Pro League	6	6	—		0	0	—		2 (Note: Appearances in AFC Champions League Elite)	0	—		8	6
Career total			197	47	17	6	13	4	20	4	55	13	19	4	321	78

=== International ===
As of match played 5 July 2026

Appearances and goals by national team and year
National team	Year	Apps	Goals
Brazil	2022	6	0
Brazil	2023	3	1
Brazil	2024	7	1
Brazil	2025	4	1
Brazil	2026	7	2
Total		27	5

Scores and results list Brazil's goal tally first.

List of international goals scored by Gabriel Martinelli
No.	Date	Venue	Cap	Opponent	Score	Result	Competition
1	16 November 2023	Estadio Metropolitano Roberto Meléndez, Barranquilla, Colombia	8	Colombia	1–0	1–2	2026 FIFA World Cup qualification
2	8 June 2024	Kyle Field, College Station, United States	10	Mexico	2–0	3–2	Friendly
3	14 October 2025	Ajinomoto Stadium, Chōfu, Japan	20	Japan	2–0	2–3	2025 Kirin Challenge Cup
4	31 March 2026	Camping World Stadium, Orlando, United States	22	Croatia	3–1	3–1	Friendly
5	29 June 2026	NRG Stadium, Houston, United States	26	Japan	2–1	2–1	2026 FIFA World Cup

== Honours ==
Arsenal

- Premier League: 2025–26
- FA Cup: 2019–20
- FA Community Shield: 2023
- EFL Cup runner-up: 2025–26
- UEFA Champions League runner-up: 2025–26

Brazil U23

- Summer Olympics gold medal: 2020

Individual

- Campeonato Paulista Young Player of the Year: 2019
- Campeonato Paulista Team of the Year: 2019
- Arsenal Player of the Month: September 2025
- BBC Goal of the Month: September 2025
