= Matheus Cunha =

Brazilian footballer (born 1999)

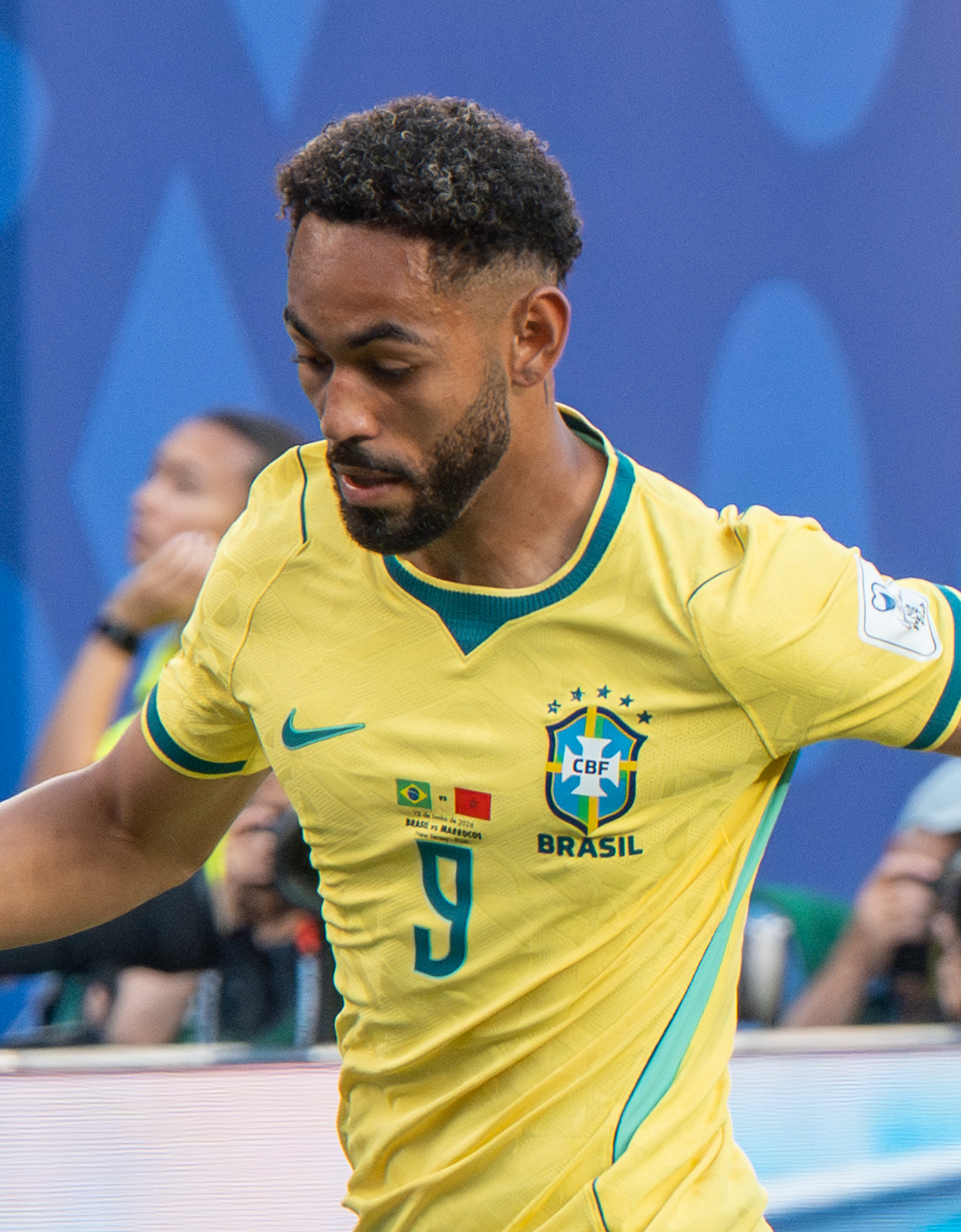
- Cunha with Brazil in 2026

Personal information
- Full name: Matheus Santos Carneiro da Cunha
- Date of birth: 27 May 1999 (age 27)
- Place of birth: João Pessoa, Paraíba, Brazil
- Height: 1.83 m (6 ft 0 in)
- Positions: Forward; attacking midfielder; winger

Team information
- Current team: Manchester United
- Number: 10

Youth career
- –2017: Coritiba

Senior career*
Years	Team	Apps	(Gls)
2017–2018	Sion	29	(10)
2018–2020	RB Leipzig	35	(2)
2020–2021	Hertha BSC	39	(12)
2021–2023	Atlético Madrid	40	(6)
2023	→ Wolverhampton Wanderers (loan)	17	(2)
2023–2025	Wolverhampton Wanderers	65	(27)
2025–	Manchester United	44	(11)

International career^{‡}
- Brazil U23
2021–	Brazil	28	(4)
Medal record
Men's football
Representing Brazil
Olympic Games
Gold medal – first place	2020	Team
- * Club domestic league appearances and goals as of 20:45, 22 November 2026 (UTC) ‡ National team caps and goals as of 22:16, 5 July 2026 (UTC)

Matheus Santos Carneiro da Cunha (Brazilian Portuguese: [maˈtews ˈkũɲɐ]; born 27 May 1999) is a Brazilian professional footballer who plays as a forward, attacking midfielder, or winger for Premier League club Manchester United and the Brazil national team.

Cunha played youth football in Brazil for Coritiba. At the age of 18, he moved to Europe to join Swiss club Sion. He then played for Bundesliga clubs RB Leipzig and Hertha BSC, before joining Atlético Madrid in August 2021. In January 2023, he moved to Wolverhampton Wanderers, initially on loan. In August 2025, he was signed by Manchester United for a transfer fee of £62.5 million.

Cunha won a gold medal with the Brazil under-23 team at the 2020 Summer Olympics. He made his senior international debut in September 2021, and represented Brazil at the 2026 FIFA World Cup.

== Early life ==
Cunha was born in the city of João Pessoa, Brazil. He originally played futsal for a club in Recife, before switching to football.

== Club career ==
=== Sion ===
Cunha played youth football for Coritiba, before joining Swiss club Sion at the age of 18 in July 2017, after impressing scouts at the Dallas Cup youth tournament. In May 2018, he scored a hat-trick in a 4–1 victory over Thun.

=== RB Leipzig ===
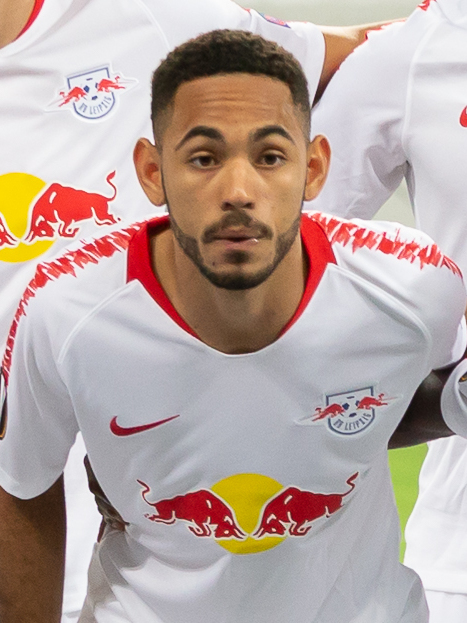
Cunha with RB Leipzig in 2018

On 24 June 2018, Cunha joined Bundesliga club RB Leipzig on a five-year deal. He scored his maiden Bundesliga goal against his future club Hertha BSC, to mark a 3–0 win in November 2018. He scored a goal against Bayer Leverkusen in April 2019 that won the Bundesliga Goal of the Month award, and was nominated for the FIFA Puskás Award. He finished the 2018–19 UEFA Europa League season with 6 goals.

=== Hertha BSC ===
On 31 January 2020, having played 10 games mostly as a substitute and scored once for RB Leipzig in the first half of the season, Cunha moved to fellow Bundesliga team Hertha BSC on an undisclosed "long-term" contract.

=== Atlético Madrid ===
On 25 August 2021, Cunha joined Atlético Madrid on a five-year deal for an estimated fee of €30 million. He scored his first goal against Levante to seal a 2–2 draw.

=== Wolverhampton Wanderers ===
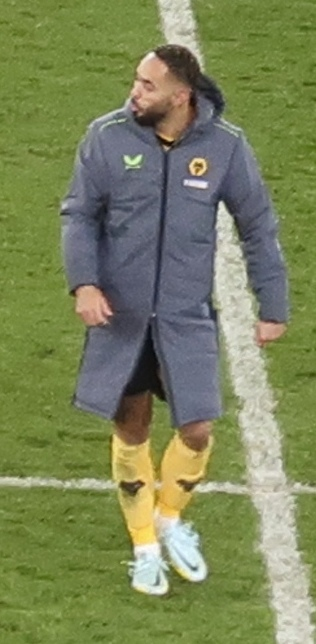
Cunha with Wolverhampton Wanderers in 2023

On 1 January 2023, Cunha joined Wolverhampton Wanderers on loan for the remainder of the 2022–23 season, in a deal which stipulated the move would become permanent in the summer of 2023, certain clauses in the loan agreement having been met. Cunha's first appearance was as a second-half substitute in a 1–1 draw away to Aston Villa on 4 January. His first goal for Wolves came in a 4–2 defeat at home to Leeds United on 18 March.

Cunha's first goal of the 2023–24 Premier League season came in a 3–2 defeat away to Crystal Palace on 3 September 2023. He scored his first FA Cup goal, a penalty, in extra-time of a 3–2 Third Round replay victory over Brentford at Molineux on 16 January 2024. He scored again in the next round against Wolves' bitterest rivals, West Bromwich Albion, in a 2–0 victory at The Hawthorns on 28 January, a goal that led to crowd unrest breaking out in sections of the ground designated for West Brom supporters. On 4 February, he scored his first Wolves hat-trick in a 4–2 away victory against Chelsea, becoming just the second Wolves player (after Diogo Jota in January 2019) to score a hat-trick in the Premier League and only the fourth opposition player to score a hat-trick at Stamford Bridge in Premier League history. He scored 14 goals over the season.

Cunha scored his first goal of the 2024–25 season in a 6–2 home defeat to Chelsea. Cunha also scored in defeats to Aston Villa and Brentford before he scored a late equaliser against Brighton & Hove Albion to give Wolves their second point of the season.

Cunha then scored Wolves' second goal in a 2–0 win over Southampton which was the team's first win of the season. Two weeks later Cunha scored a brace in a 4–1 win over Fulham to lift the team out of the relegation zone.

On 14 December, in a 2–1 home loss to Ipswich Town in the last game before Gary O'Neil's dismissal, Cunha appeared to elbow an employee of the visiting club in the back of the head, before reaching to the same man's face and pulling his glasses off. Cunha was charged with misconduct by the Football Association. On 31 December, Cunha was given a two game ban from the FA with a fine of £80,000 following the incident. On 1 February 2025, he extended his contract with the club until 2029 shortly after he scored in Wolves' 2–0 victory over Aston Villa. Cunha finished the 2024–25 season with 15 league goals, marking a personal best and ranking as his club's highest scorer.

=== Manchester United ===
On 1 June 2025, fellow Premier League club Manchester United announced an agreement with Wolves for the transfer of Cunha. On 12 June 2025, United completed the transfer for a reported fee of £62.5m. On 17 August, he made his debut for the club in a 1–0 loss against Arsenal in the league.

On 27 August 2025, during the second round of the EFL Cup against League Two side Grimsby Town, Cunha missed the winning penalty during a penalty shootout, which would have sent United into the third round of the EFL Cup, but after fellow new United signing Bryan Mbeumo also missed his penalty, United lost. Later that year, on 25 October, he netted his first goal for the club in a 4–2 win over Brighton scoring from outside the box with a low shot. On 25 January 2026, he scored the winning goal in a 3–2 away win over Arsenal, securing his club's first league win at the Emirates Stadium since December 2017.

== International career ==
=== Under-23 team ===
With Brazil's under-23 team, Cunha was the top scorer of the 2019 Toulon Tournament and the 2020 CONMEBOL Pre-Olympic Tournament, winning the former and finishing as runner-up in the latter, thus securing qualification to the Olympics for the Brazil team with the latter performance. On 17 June 2021, he was named in Brazil's squad for the 2020 Summer Olympics in Tokyo. In August 2021, he won a gold medal with Brazil at the Olympics, having scored 3 goals in 5 appearances at the tournament.

=== Senior team ===
In September 2020, Cunha was called up to the senior Brazil squad for 2022 FIFA World Cup qualification matches against Bolivia and Peru on 9 and 13 October 2020, respectively.

Cunha made his debut for the senior national team on 2 September 2021, in a World Cup qualifier against Chile, a 1–0 away victory. He substituted Gabriel Barbosa in the 78th minute.

He scored his first international goal for Brazil on 25 March 2025, in a 4–1 away defeat to Argentina.

In May 2026, Cunha was selected for Brazil's squad for the 2026 FIFA World Cup. In Brazil's second group match on 19 June, he scored twice in a 3–0 victory over Haiti.

== Player profile ==
=== Style of play ===
Cunha is a versatile forward capable of playing as a central striker, attacking midfielder, or inside forward. His playing style is characterized by ball-carrying ability, movement, and long-range shooting accuracy. His primary strengths lie in transitioning play, dribbling in tight spaces, and recording both goals and assists.

However, his playing style is also noted for being highly instinctive and emotional, sometimes lacking tactical discipline. Cunha has described himself as a "maverick" who prefers freedom over structure. Despite not being known for his work rate, he has demonstrated impressive defensive ability, particularly in ball recoveries and interceptions.

=== Goal celebration ===
Cunha is known for his surfing-themed goal celebration, in which he bends his knees and extends his arms to imitate balancing on a surfboard. He performed the celebration after scoring the winning goal for Wolverhampton Wanderers in a 1–0 away victory over AFC Bournemouth on 22 February 2025. Cunha later explained that the gesture was inspired by surfing lessons he took in a small village (Baía Formosa, RN - also the homeland of Olympic gold medalist surfer and former surfing World champion Ítalo Ferreira, who became Cunha's friend) near his hometown in Brazil, after which he began to consider himself a surfer. The celebration subsequently became one of his recognisable trademarks at Manchester United.

== Career statistics ==
=== Club ===
As of match played 22 November 2026

Appearances and goals by club, season and competition
Club	Season	League			National cup (Note: Includes Swiss Cup, DFB-Pokal, Copa del Rey, FA Cup)		League cup (Note: Includes EFL Cup)		Europe		Other		Total	
Club	Season	Division	Apps	Goals	Apps	Goals	Apps	Goals	Apps	Goals	Apps	Goals	Apps	Goals
Sion	2017–18	Swiss Super League	29	10	1	0	—		2 (Note: Appearances in UEFA Europa League)	0	—		32	10
RB Leipzig	2018–19	Bundesliga	25	2	2	1	—		12	6	—		39	9
RB Leipzig	2019–20	Bundesliga	10	0	1	0	—		2 (Note: Appearances in UEFA Champions League)	0	—		13	0
RB Leipzig	Total		35	2	3	1	—		14	6	—		52	9
Hertha BSC	2019–20	Bundesliga	11	5	0	0	—		—		—		11	5
Hertha BSC	2020–21	Bundesliga	27	7	1	1	—		—		—		28	8
Hertha BSC	2021–22	Bundesliga	1	0	0	0	—		—		—		1	0
Hertha BSC	Total		39	12	1	1	—		—		—		40	13
Atlético Madrid	2021–22	La Liga	29	6	2	1	—		5	0	1 (Note: Appearance in Supercopa de España)	0	37	7
Atlético Madrid	2022–23	La Liga	11	0	1	0	—		5	0	—		17	0
Atlético Madrid	Total		40	6	3	1	—		10	0	1	0	54	7
Wolverhampton Wanderers (loan)	2022–23	Premier League	17	2	2	0	1	0	—		—		20	2
Wolverhampton Wanderers	2023–24	Premier League	32	12	3	2	1	0	—		—		36	14
Wolverhampton Wanderers	2024–25	Premier League	33	15	2	2	1	0	—		—		36	17
Wolverhampton Wanderers	Wolves total		82	29	7	4	3	0	—		—		92	33
Manchester United	2025–26	Premier League	33	10	1	0	1	0	—		—		35	10
Manchester United	2026–27	Premier League	11	1	0	0	1	0	4	3	—		16	4
Manchester United	Total		44	11	1	0	2	0	4	3	—		51	14
Career total			269	70	16	7	5	0	30	9	1	0	321	86

=== International ===
As of match played 5 July 2026

Appearances and goals by national team and year
National team	Year	Apps	Goals
Brazil	2021	4	0
Brazil	2022	4	0
Brazil	2023	3	0
Brazil	2025	8	1
Brazil	2026	9	3
Total		28	4

As of match played 5 July 2026
Brazil score listed first, score column indicates score after each Cunha goal.

List of international goals scored by Matheus Cunha
No.	Date	Venue	Cap	Opponent	Score	Result	Competition
1	25 March 2025	Estadio Monumental, Buenos Aires, Argentina	13	Argentina	1–2	1–4	2026 FIFA World Cup qualification
2	19 June 2026	Lincoln Financial Field, Philadelphia, United States	25	Haiti	1–0	3–0	2026 FIFA World Cup
3	19 June 2026	Lincoln Financial Field, Philadelphia, United States	25	Haiti	2–0	3–0	2026 FIFA World Cup
4	24 June 2026	Hard Rock Stadium, Miami Gardens, United States	26	Scotland	3–0	3–0	2026 FIFA World Cup

== Honours ==
Brazil U23

- Summer Olympics: 2020
- Toulon Tournament: 2019

Individual

- Wolverhampton Wanderers Players' Player of the Season: 2024–25
