= Ira Eliezer Tapé =

Ivorian footballer

Personal information
- Date of birth: 31 August 1997 (age 29)
- Place of birth: Abobo, Ivory Coast
- Height: 1.92 m (6 ft 4 in)
- Position: Goalkeeper

Team information
- Current team: TS Galaxy
- Number: 16

Youth career
- –2016: Aspire Academy

Senior career*
Years	Team	Apps	(Gls)
2016–2017	SOA		
2017–2022	San Pédro		
2022–2023	Bahir Dar Kenema	16	(0)
2023–2024	Hadiya Hossana	15	(0)
2024–	TS Galaxy	55	(0)

International career^{‡}
2019–	Ivory Coast U23	5	(0)
2021–	Ivory Coast Olympic	1	(0)
2019–	Ivory Coast	2	(0)
- * Club domestic league appearances and goals as of 3 August 2026 (UTC) ‡ National team caps and goals as of 3 August 2026 (UTC)

Ira Eliezer Tapé (born 31 August 1997) is an Ivorian professional footballer who plays as a goalkeeper for South African Premiership club TS Galaxy and the Ivory Coast national team.

== Career statistics ==
=== International ===
As of match played 14 July 2021

National team	Year	Apps	Goals
Ivory Coast	2019	2	0
Total		2	0
