= Miyagi Stadium =

Football stadium in Japan

Coordinates: 38°20′07″N 140°57′01″E

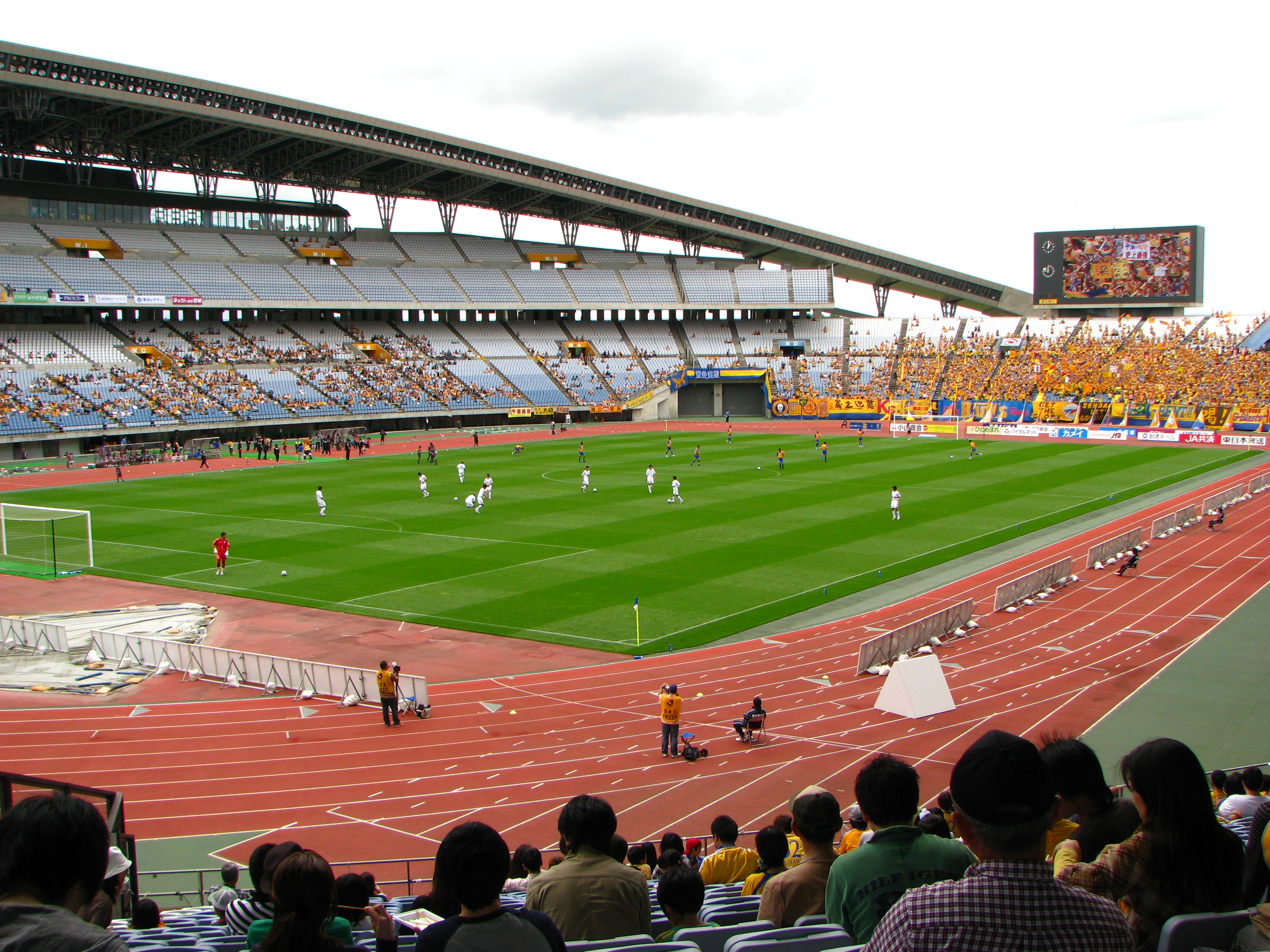
- Interactive map of Miyagi Stadium
- Full name: Q&A Stadium Miyagi
- Former names: Miyagi Stadium (2000–2014); Hitomebore Stadium Miyagi (2014–2020)
- Location: Rifu, Miyagi, Japan
- Owner: Miyagi Prefecture
- Capacity: 49,133
- Surface: Grass

Construction
- Groundbreaking: 1996
- Opened: March 2000

Tenants
- Vegalta Sendai; Mynavi Sendai Ladies; Sony Sendai FC; Japan National Football Team: Major sporting events hosted; 2002 FIFA World Cup; 2012 FIFA U-20 Women's World Cup; 2020 Summer Olympics; Also see: Major concert events hosted

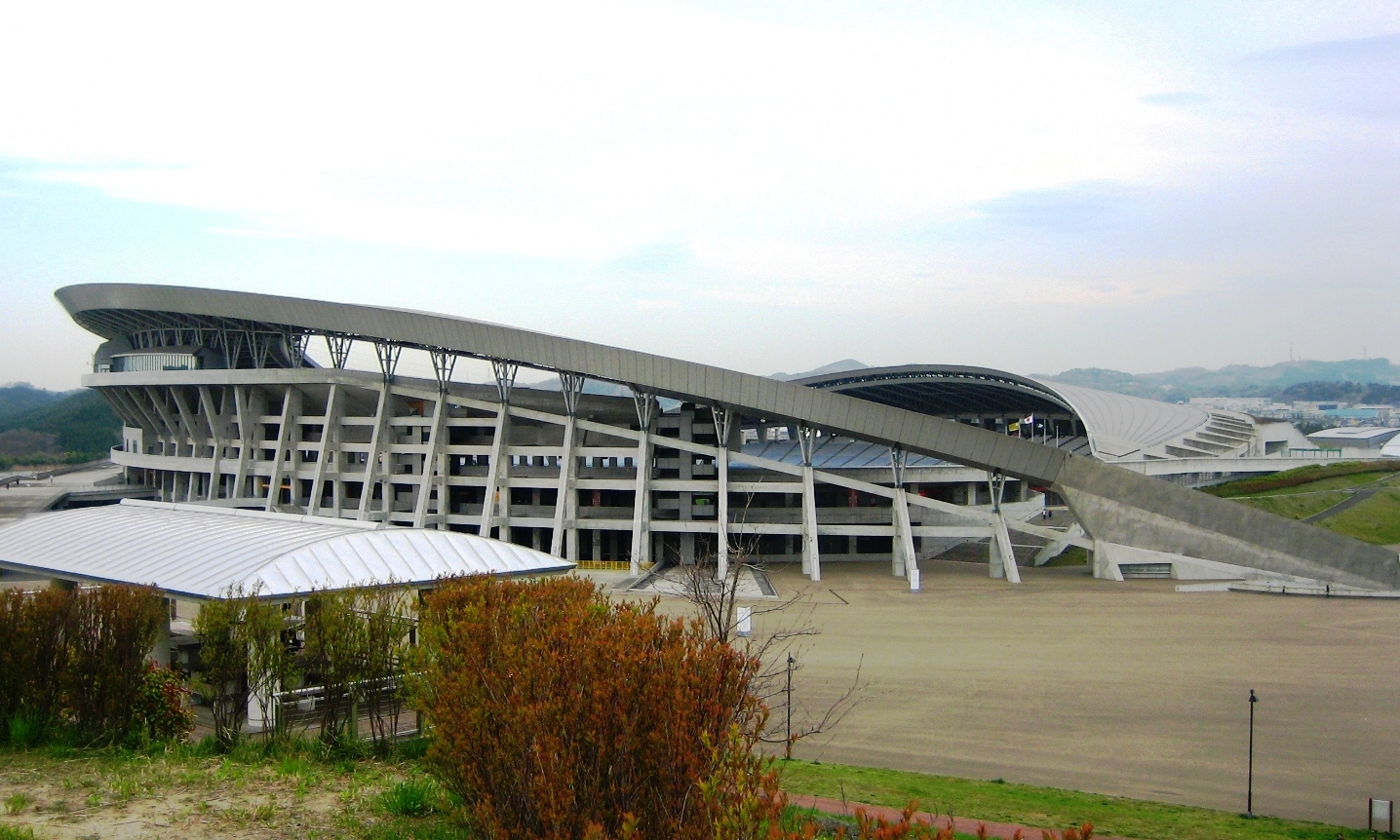

Miyagi Stadium (宮城スタジアム, Miyagi Sutajiamu), a.k.a. the Q&A Stadium Miyagi (キューアンドエースタジアムみやぎ, Kyūandoēsutajiamu Miyagi) for sponsorship reasons, is an athletic and football stadium in the town of Rifu in Miyagi Prefecture, Japan. The stadium's capacity is 49,133. The crescent-shaped roof extending past the edge of the stadium is meant to evoke images of Date Masamune, a daimyō of Mutsu Province, which included the present-day Miyagi Prefecture. From 1 April 2014, the stadium was known as the Hitomebore Stadium Miyagi (ひとめぼれスタジアム宮城, Hitomebore Sutajiamu Miyagi), named after the main variety of rice produced in the prefecture, as the naming rights were acquired by the Miyagi Prefecture headquarters of Zen-Noh. The stadium adopted its current name on 1 April 2020 due to a sponsorship agreement with the Q&A Corporation.

Miyagi Stadium hosted three matches in the 2002 World Cup, and also hosted the 56th National Sports Festival of Japan in 2001. It is one of the planned football venues for the 2020 Summer Olympics.

In addition, Miyagi Stadium also hosted six matches at the 2012 FIFA U-20 Women's World Cup and it would become the first stadium (and to date the only stadium) to have hosted matches at both a men's FIFA World Cup and a women's FIFA U-20 World Cup.

Vegalta, Mynavi and Sony Sendai only use here occasionally.

The football field is surrounded by a nine-lane track. A large video screen and scoreboard is installed in the northern end.

== 2002 FIFA World Cup matches ==
Date	Team 1	Result	Team 2	Round	Attendance
9 June 2002	Mexico	2–1	Ecuador	Group G	45,610
12 June 2002	Sweden	1–1	Argentina	Group F	45,777
18 June 2002	Japan	0–1	Turkey	Round of 16	45,666

== 2012 FIFA U-20 Women's World Cup matches ==
Date	Team 1	Result	Team 2	Round
19 August 2012	New Zealand	2–1	Switzerland	Group A
19 August 2012	Japan	4–1	Mexico	Group A
22 August 2012	Mexico	2–0	Switzerland	Group A
22 August 2012	Japan	2–2	New Zealand	Group A
27 August 2012	Germany	3–0	United States	Group D
27 August 2012	Norway	4–1	Argentina	Group C

== Football at the 2020 Summer Olympics ==
=== Women's ===
Date	Team 1	Result	Team 2	Round
21 July 2021	China PR	0–5	Brazil	Group F
21 July 2021	Zambia	3–10	Netherlands	Group F
24 July 2021	China PR	4–4	Zambia	Group F
24 July 2021	Netherlands	3–3	Brazil	Group F
27 July 2021	New Zealand	0–2	Sweden	Group G
27 July 2021	Chile	0–1	Japan	Group E

=== Men's ===
Date	Team 1	Result	Team 2	Round
28 July 2021	Germany	1–1	Ivory Coast	Group D
28 July 2021	Australia	0–2	Egypt	Group C
31 July 2021	Spain	5–2 (a.e.t.)	Ivory Coast	Quarter-finals

== Other notable events ==
Besides the game against Turkey, Miyagi Stadium has hosted three friendly matches involving the Japan national team: A 1–1 draw against Slovakia on 11 June 2000, a 5–4 victory against Honduras on 7 September 2005, and a 2–4 loss against Uruguay on 14 August 2013, a 2–0 victory against El Salvador on 9 June 2019. J. League club Vegalta Sendai has held home games at Miyagi Stadium, and pop-music group SMAP has held two outdoor concerts at the venue as well. Also Nogizaka46 has held two days concert at the venue in 2018 for their Summer Tour.

== Access ==
Rifu Station is the closest train station, although it is nearly 3.5 kilometers from the stadium. For major events, bus transportation is usually available from Izumi-Chūō and Sendai Stations. Before the World Cup, a spur from the Sanriku Expressway was built, which provided easier access for travellers by car from Tokyo and other locales.

== See also ==
- Yurtec Stadium Sendai
- Sekisui Heim Super Arena
- List of stadiums in Japan
