= Osama Galal =

Egyptian footballer (born 1997)

Osama Galal أسامة جلال
Personal information
- Full name: Osama Galal Hamed Toeima
- Date of birth: 17 September 1997 (age 29)
- Place of birth: Tanta, Egypt
- Height: 1.84 m (6 ft 0 in)
- Position: Centre-back

Team information
- Current team: Pyramids
- Number: 27

Senior career*
Years	Team	Apps	(Gls)
2016–2021	ENPPI	27	(0)
2016–2017	→ Petrojet (loan)	4	(0)
2018–2019	→ Misr Lel Makkasa (loan)	12	(0)
2021–	Pyramids	3	(1)

International career
	Egypt U20	7	(0)
- Egypt U23
2021–	Egypt	3	(1)
- * Club domestic league appearances and goals

Osama Galal Hamed Toeima (born 17 September 1997) is an Egyptian professional football player who plays as a centre-back for Pyramids FC.

He represented Egypt at the 2020 Summer Olympics.

Appearances and goals by club, season and competition
Club	Season	League			National cup (Note: Includes Egypt Cup)		Continental		Other		Total	
Club	Season	Division	Apps	Goals	Apps	Goals	Apps	Goals	Apps	Goals	Apps	Goals
Petrojet (loan)	2016-17	Egyptian Premier League	4	0	0	0	0	0	0	0	4	0
Petrojet (loan)	Total		4	0	0	0	0	0	0	0	4	0
ENPPI SC	2017-18	Egyptian Premier League	1	0	0	0	0	0	0	0	1	0
Misr Lel-Makkasa (loan)	2018-19	Egyptian Premier League	12	0	0	0	0	0	0	0	12	0
ENPPI SC	2019-20	Egyptian Premier League	25	0	1	0	0	0	0	0	26	0
ENPPI SC	Total		26	0	1	0	0	0	0	0	27	0
Pyramids	2020-21	Egyptian Premier League	8	1	2	0	5 (Note: Appearance(s) in the CAF Confederation Cup)	0	0	0	15	1
Pyramids	2021-22	Egyptian Premier League	19	2	3	0	7	0	1 (Note: Appearance(s) in the Egyptian League Cup)	0	30	2
Pyramids	2022-23	Egyptian Premier League	12	0	0	0	5	0	0	0	17	0
Pyramids	2023-24	Egyptian Premier League	13	0	1	0	5 (Note: Appearance(s) in the CAF Champions League)	0	2 (Note: Appearance(s) in the Egyptian Super Cup)	0	21	0
Pyramids	2024-25	Egyptian Premier League	1	1	0	0	2	0	2 (Note: Appearance(s) in the Egyptian League Cup & Egyptian Super Cup)	0	5	1
Pyramids	Total		53	4	6	0	24	0	5	0	88	4
Career Total			95	4	7	0	24	0	5	0	131	4

== International ==
As of match played 18 November 2022

Appearances and goals by national team and year
National team	Year	Apps	Goals
Egypt	2022	1	0
Total		1	0

== Honours ==
Pyramids FC

- Egypt Cup: 2023-24
- CAF Champions League: 2024–25
- FIFA African–Asian–Pacific Cup: 2025

Egypt U23

- U-23 Africa Cup of Nations: 2019
