= Ammar Hamdy =

Egyptian footballer (born 1999)

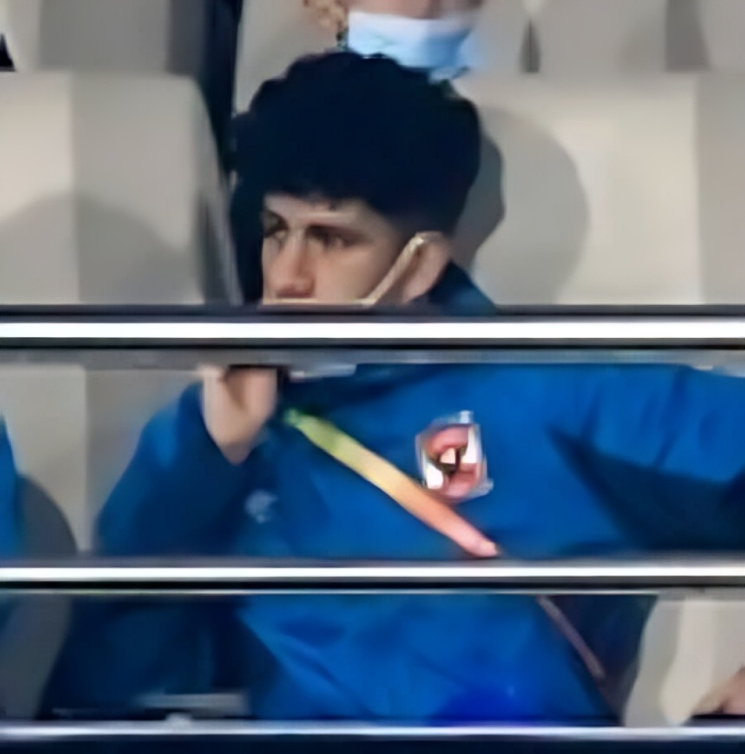
- Ammar With Al Ahly in 2021 FIFA Club World Cup

Personal information
- Full name: Ammar Hamdy Ahmed Maghrabi Omar
- Date of birth: 26 November 1999 (age 26)
- Place of birth: Egypt
- Height: 1.68 m (5 ft 6 in)
- Position: Midfielder

Team information
- Current team: ZED
- Number: 22

Senior career*
Years	Team	Apps	(Gls)
2017–2018	Al Nasr Cairo	17	(1)
2018–2024	Al Ahly	4	(0)
2018–2019	→ Ittihad Alex (loan)	14	(3)
2019–2020	→ Tala'ea El Gaish (loan)	14	(0)
2020–2021	→ Ittihad Alex (loan)	30	(1)
2023–2023	→ Ittihad Alex (loan)	11	(1)
2023–2024	→ Al Mokawloon (loan)	15	(1)
2024–	ZED		
2025–	→ Petrojet SC (loan)		

International career
2019–	Egypt	1	(0)
Medal record
Representing Egypt
U-23 Africa Cup of Nations
Winner	Egypt 2019	Egypt U-23
- * Club domestic league appearances and goals

Ammar Hamdy Ahmed Maghrabi Omar (Arabic: عَمَّار حَمْدِيّ أَحْمَد مَغْرِبِيّ عُمَر; born 26 November 1999) is an Egyptian professional footballer who plays as a midfielder for the Egyptian national team and the Egyptian Premier League club ZED.

Ammar is the youngest player to hold the Al Ahly's captain armband.

== International ==
He made his debut for the Egypt national football team on 23 March 2019 in an Africa Cup qualifier against Niger, as a starter.

== Honours ==
=== Egypt ===
- Africa U-23 Cup of Nations Champions: 2019
