= Srđan Jovanović (referee) =

Serbian football referee

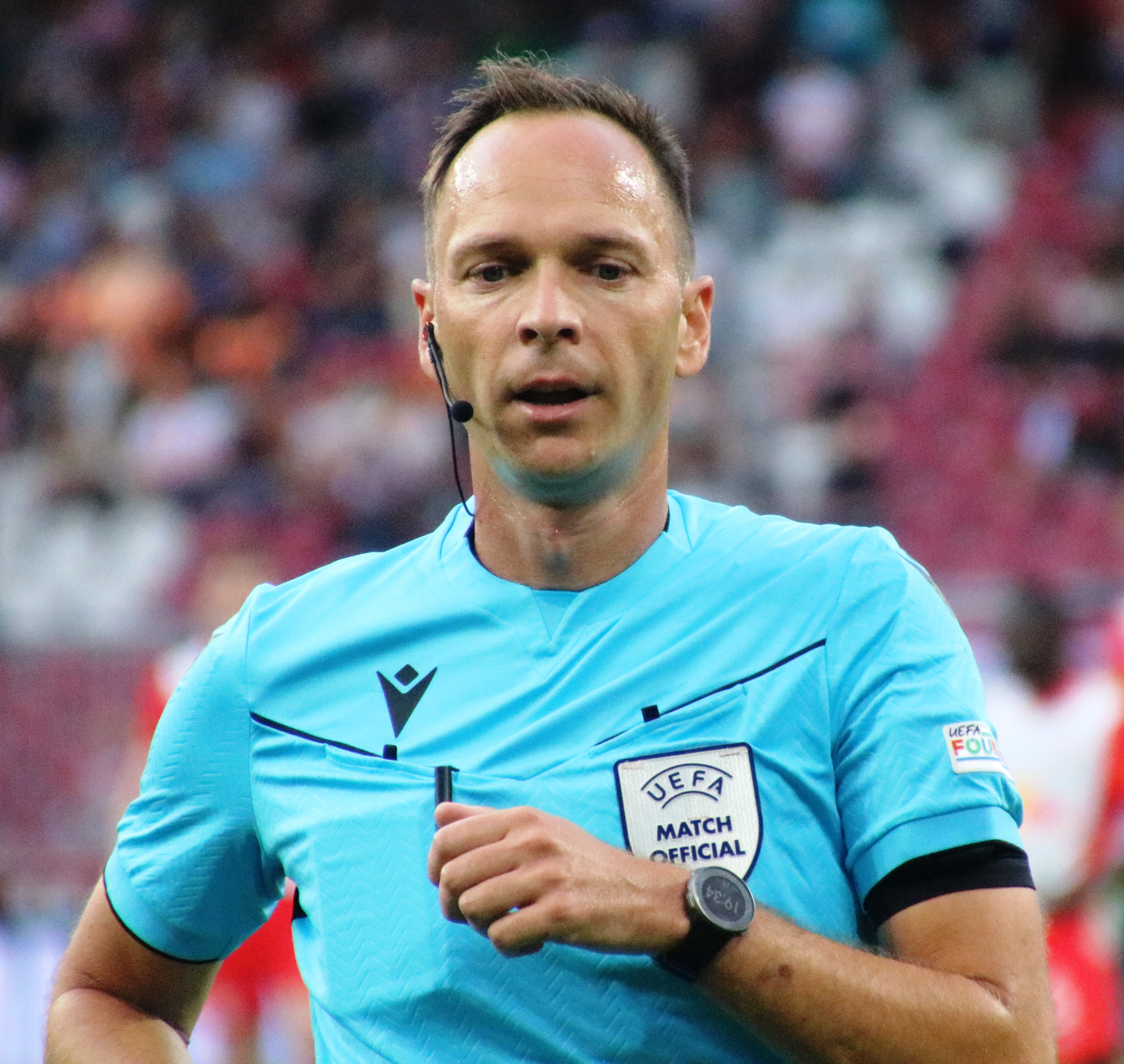
- Jovanović in 2025
- Born: 9 April 1986 (age 40); Belgrade, SR Serbia, SFR Yugoslavia

Domestic
Years	League	Role
2014–	Serbian SuperLiga	Referee

International
Years	League	Role
2015–	FIFA listed	Referee

Srđan Jovanović (Serbian Cyrillic: Срђан Јовановић; born 9 April 1986) is a Serbian football referee who officiates in the Serbian SuperLiga. He has been a FIFA referee since 2015, and is ranked as a UEFA elite category referee.

== Refereeing career ==
In 2014, Jovanović began officiating in the Serbian SuperLiga. His first match as referee was on 30 August 2014 between Radnički Niš and Donji Srem, in which he showed a red card to Miloš Petrović. In 2015, he was put on the FIFA referees list. He officiated his first senior international match on 16 January 2016 between the United Arab Emirates and Iceland. Jovanović also officiated match in the Super League Greece on 17 March 2019 between Atromitos and AEK Athens. In 2019, he was selected as a referee for the 2019 FIFA U-17 World Cup in Brazil.

== Personal life ==
Jovanović was born in the Kaluđerica neighbourhood of Belgrade in SR Serbia, SFR Yugoslavia.

== See also ==
- List of football referees
