= South Africa at the 2020 Summer Olympics =

- Flag of South Africa
- IOC code: RSA
- NOC: South African Sports Confederation and Olympic Committee
- Website: www.sascoc.co.za

in Tokyo, Japan July 23, 2021 – August 8, 2021
- Competitors: 179 in 19 sports
- Flag bearers (opening): Phumelela Mbande; Chad le Clos
- Flag bearer (closing): Anaso Jobodwana
- Medals Ranked 52nd: Gold 1 Silver 2 Bronze 0 Total 3

Summer Olympics appearances (overview)
- 1904; 1908; 1912; 1920; 1924; 1928; 1932; 1936; 1948; 1952; 1956; 1960; 1964–1988; 1992; 1996; 2000; 2004; 2008; 2012; 2016; 2020; 2024; 2028

South Africa competed at the 2020 Summer Olympics in Tokyo. Originally scheduled to take place from 24 July to 9 August 2020, the Games were postponed to 23 July to 8 August 2021, because of the COVID-19 pandemic. It was the nation's eighth consecutive appearance at the Games in the post-apartheid era, and twentieth overall in Summer Olympic history.

A week before the Games started, two football players and a video analyst were tested positive for COVID-19 while staying at the Olympic Village.

== Medalists ==
Medal	Name	Sport	Event	Date
Gold	Tatjana Schoenmaker	Swimming	Women's 200 metre breaststroke	30 July
Silver	Tatjana Schoenmaker	Swimming	Women's 100 metre breaststroke	27 July
Silver	Bianca Buitendag	Surfing	Women's shortboard	27 July

Medals by sport
Sport	1st place, gold medalist(s)	2nd place, silver medalist(s)	3rd place, bronze medalist(s)	Total
Surfing	0	1	0	1
Swimming	1	1	0	2
Total	1	2	0	3

=== Multiple medallists ===
The following competitors won several medals at the 2020 Olympic Games.

Name	Medal	Sport	Event
Tatjana Schoenmaker	Gold; Silver	Swimming	Women's 200 metre breaststroke Women's 100 metre breaststroke

== Competitors ==
The following is the list of number of competitors in the Games. Note that reserves in field hockey and football are not counted:

Sport	Men	Women	Total
Artistic swimming	0	2	2
Athletics	25	5	30
Cycling	7	4	11
Diving	0	2	2
Equestrian	0	2	2
Field hockey	16	16	32
Football	17	0	17
Golf	2	1	3
Gymnastics	0	2	2
Judo	0	1	1
Rowing	6	0	6
Rugby sevens	12	0	12
Sailing	3	0	3
Skateboarding	2	2	4
Sport climbing	1	1	2
Surfing	0	1	1
Swimming	8	9	17
Triathlon	2	2	4
Water polo	13	13	26
Total	115	64	179

== Artistic swimming ==
South Africa fielded a squad of two artistic swimmers to compete in the women's duet event, by securing a berth as the highest-ranked pair, not yet qualified, from Africa at the 2019 FINA World Championships in Gwangju, South Korea, heralding the country's return to the sport for the first time since Barcelona 1992.

Athlete	Event	Technical routine		Free routine (preliminary)			Free routine (final)		
Athlete	Event	Points	Rank	Points	Total (technical + free)	Rank	Points	Total (technical + free)	Rank
Clarissa Johnston; Laura Strugnell	Duet	70.9099	21	72.1667	143.0766	21	Did not advance		

== Athletics (track and field) ==
Thirty South African athletes achieved the entry standards, either by qualifying time or by world ranking, in the following track and field events (up to a maximum of 3 athletes in each event):

Key

- Note–Ranks given for track events are within the athlete's heat only
- Q = Qualified for the next round
- q = Qualified for the next round as a fastest loser or, in field events, by position without achieving the qualifying target
- NR = National record
- N/A = Round not applicable for the event
- Bye = Athlete not required to compete in round
- NM = No mark
- DNF = Did not finish

Track & road events
Men

Athlete	Event	Heat		Quarterfinal		Semifinal		Final	
Athlete	Event	Time	Rank	Time	Rank	Time	Rank	Time	Rank
Gift Leotlela	100 m	Bye		10.04	1 Q	10.03	4	Did not advance	
Shaun Maswanganyi	100 m	Bye		10.12	3 Q	10.10	6	Did not advance	
Akani Simbine	100 m	Bye		10.08	1 Q	9.90	4 q	9.93	4
Anaso Jobodwana	200 m	20.78	3 Q	—N/a		20.88	8	Did not advance	
Shaun Maswanganyi	200 m	20.58	2 Q	—N/a		20.18	4	Did not advance	
Clarence Munyai	200 m	20.49	4 q	—N/a		20.49	6	Did not advance	
Zakithi Nene	400 m	45.74	5	—N/a		Did not advance			
Wayde van Niekerk	400 m	45.25	3 Q	—N/a		45.14	5	Did not advance	
Thapelo Phora	400 m	45.83	5	—N/a		Did not advance			
Lesiba Mashele	5000 m	13:48.25	15	—N/a				Did not advance	
Antonio Alkana	110 m hurdles	13.55	6	—N/a		Did not advance			
Sokwakhana Zazini	400 m hurdles	49.51	3 Q	—N/a		48.99	6	Did not advance	
Gift Leotlela; Shaun Maswanganyi; Clarence Munyai; Galaletsang Ramorwa; Akani Simbine	4 × 100 m relay	DNF		—N/a				Did not advance	
Ranti Dikgale; Zakithi Nene; Thapelo Phora; Lythe Pillay; Wayde van Niekerk	4 × 400 m relay	3:01.18	7	—N/a				Did not advance	
Elroy Gelant	Marathon	—N/a						2:16:43	34
Desmond Mokgobu	Marathon	—N/a						DNF	
Stephen Mokoka	Marathon	—N/a						DNF	
Wayne Snyman	20 km walk	—N/a						1:24.33	20
Marc Mundell	50 km walk	—N/a						4:14:37	40

Women

Athlete	Event	Heat		Semifinal		Final	
Athlete	Event	Time	Rank	Time	Rank	Time	Rank
Dominique Scott	5000 m	15:13.94	13	—N/a		Did not advance	
Dominique Scott	10000 m	—N/a				32:14.05	20
Wenda Nel	400 m hurdles	56.06	3 Q	56.35	7	Did not advance	
Gerda Steyn	Marathon	—N/a				2:32.10	15
Irvette van Zyl	Marathon	—N/a				DNF	

=== Field events ===
Athlete	Event	Qualification		Final	
Athlete	Event	Distance	Position	Distance	Position
Cheswill Johnson	Men's long jump	NM	—	Did not advance	
Ruswahl Samaai	Men's long jump	7.74	22	Did not advance	
Kyle Blignaut	Men's shot put	20.97	8 q	21.00	6
Jason van Rooyen	Men's shot put	20.29	19	Did not advance	
Rocco van Rooyen	Men's javelin throw	77.41	23	Did not advance	
Jo Ane van Dyk	Women's javelin throw	57.69	24	Did not advance	

== Cycling ==
=== Road ===
South Africa entered a squad of five riders (three men and two women) to compete in their respective Olympic road races, by virtue of their top 50 national finish (for men) and top 22 (for women) in the UCI World Ranking.

Athlete	Event	Time	Rank
Stefan de Bod	Men's road race	6:16:53	52
Stefan de Bod	Men's time trial	57:57.10	14
Nicholas Dlamini	Men's road race	Did not finish	
Ryan Gibbons	Men's road race	Did not finish	
Ashleigh Moolman-Pasio	Women's road race	3:54:31	13
Ashleigh Moolman-Pasio	Women's time trial	32:37.60	8
Carla Oberholzer	Women's road race	Did not finish	

=== Track ===
Following the completion of the 2020 UCI Track Cycling World Championships, South African riders accumulated spots for both men and women in the sprint and keirin, as well as the men's omnium and madison, based on their country's results in the final UCI Olympic rankings.

Sprint

Athlete	Event	Qualification		Round 1	Repechage 1	Round 2	Repechage 2	Quarterfinals	Semifinals	Final	
Athlete	Event	Time Speed (km/h)	Rank	Opposition Time Speed (km/h)	Opposition Time Speed (km/h)	Opposition Time Speed (km/h)	Opposition Time Speed (km/h)	Opposition Time Speed (km/h)	Opposition Time Speed (km/h)	Opposition Time Speed (km/h)	Rank
Jean Spies	Men's sprint	9.787; 73.567	27	Did not advance							
Charlene du Preez	Women's sprint	10.974; 65.610	22 Q	Hinze (GER); L	McCulloch (AUS); Verdugo (MEX); L	Did not advance					

Keirin

Athlete	Event	1st Round	Repechage	2nd Round	3rd Round	Final
Athlete	Event	Rank	Rank	Rank	Rank	Rank
Jean Spies	Men's keirin	5 R	5	Did not advance		
Charlene du Preez	Women's keirin	4 R	5	Did not advance		

Omnium

Athlete	Event	Scratch race		Tempo race		Elimination race		Points race		Total points	Rank
Athlete	Event	Rank	Points	Rank	Points	Rank	Points	Points	Rank	Total points	Rank
David Maree	Men's omnium	20	2	18	6	15	12	−37	18	−17	19

=== Mountain biking ===
South Africa entered one rider each to compete in both men's and women's cross-country race, respectively, by virtue of their best individual ranking at the 2019 African Championships.

Athlete	Event	Time	Rank
Alan Hatherly	Men's cross-country	1:26:33	8
Candice Lill	Women's cross-country	1:26:20	24

=== BMX ===
South African riders qualified for one men's quota place in BMX at the Olympics, by accepting a continental berth for Africa from the Union Cycliste Internationale based on its rankings of June 1, 2021.

Athlete	Event	Quarterfinal		Semifinal		Final	
Athlete	Event	Points	Rank	Points	Rank	Result	Rank
Alex Limberg	Men's race	20	6	Did not advance			

== Diving ==
South African divers qualified for two individual spots each in the women's springboard, respectively, at the Games through the 2019 African Qualifying Meet in Durban and the 2021 FINA World Cup series in Tokyo.

Athlete	Event	Preliminary		Semifinal		Final	
Athlete	Event	Points	Rank	Points	Rank	Points	Rank
Micaela Bouter	Women's 3 m springboard	216.15	26	Did not advance			
Julia Vincent	Women's 3 m springboard	228.90	25	Did not advance			

== Equestrian ==
South Africa entered two riders into the Olympic equestrian competition by the following results: a top two finish each, outside the group selection, of the individual FEI Olympic Rankings for Group F (Africa and Middle East) in both dressage and eventing, respectively.

=== Dressage ===
Rio 2016 pair of Seymour and Ramoneur got nominated to compete on June 18, 2021. The Tokyo Olympics are to be the final career international competition for the Oldenburg stallion. Seymour was forced to withdraw while in Tokyo after Ramoneur suffered laminitis.

Athlete	Horse	Event	Grand Prix		Grand Prix Freestyle		Overall	
Athlete	Horse	Event	Score	Rank	Technical	Artistic	Score	Rank
Tanya Seymour	Ramoneur	Individual	Withdrew due to her horse Ramoneur's laminitis					

Qualification Legend: Q = Qualified for the final; q = Qualified for the final as a lucky loser

=== Eventing ===
Athlete	Horse	Event	Dressage		Cross-country			Jumping						Total	
Athlete	Horse	Event	Dressage		Cross-country			Qualifier			Final			Total	
Athlete	Horse	Event	Penalties	Rank	Penalties	Total	Rank	Penalties	Total	Rank	Penalties	Total	Rank	Penalties	Rank
Victoria Scott-Legendre	Valtho des Peupliers	Individual	39.50	53	19.80	59.30	34	Withdrew							

== Field hockey ==
Summary

Key:

- FT – After full time.
- P – Match decided by penalty-shootout.

Team	Event	Group Stage						Quarterfinal	Semifinal	Final / BM	
Team	Event	Opposition Score	Opposition Score	Opposition Score	Opposition Score	Opposition Score	Rank	Opposition Score	Opposition Score	Opposition Score	Rank
South Africa men's	Men's tournament	Great Britain; L 1–3	Netherlands; L 3–5	Belgium; L 4–9	Germany; W 4–3	Canada; D 4–4	5	Did not advance			
South Africa women's	Women's tournament	Ireland; L 0–2	Great Britain; L 1–4	Netherlands; L 0–5	Germany; L 1–4	India; L 3–4	6	Did not advance			

=== Men's tournament ===
South Africa men's field hockey team qualified for the Olympics by winning the 2019 Men's African Olympic Qualifier in Stellenbosch.

Team roster

The squad was announced on 27 May 2021.

Head coach: Garreth Ewing

No.	Pos.	Player	Date of birth (age)	Caps	Goals	Club
2	FW	Mustaphaa Cassiem	19 March 2002 (aged 19)	8	7	(South Africa) Varsity College
3	DF	Tyson Dlungwana	18 February 1997 (aged 24)	47	0	(South Africa) Phoenix Hockey Club
5	DF	Austin Smith	20 May 1985 (aged 36)	178	67	(Netherlands) Den Bosch
7	DF	Timothy Drummond (Captain)	5 March 1988 (aged 33)	145	19	(Netherlands) Klein Zwitserland
8	MF	Nduduza Lembethe	13 January 1996 (aged 25)	33		(South Africa) University of Pretoria
10	FW	Keenan Horne	17 June 1992 (aged 29)	64		(South Africa) Central
13	DF	Matthew Guise-Brown	13 September 1991 (aged 29)	42	25	(England) Hampstead & Westminster
14	MF	Rusten Abrahams	16 December 1997 (aged 23)	10	2	(South Africa) University of the Witwatersrand
15	FW	Dayaan Cassiem	1 December 1998 (aged 22)	38	15	(Germany) Gladbacher HTC
17	FW	Ryan Julius	19 July 1995 (aged 26)	41		(Netherlands) Almeerse HC
18	MF	Taine Paton	4 January 1989 (aged 32)	115		(Belgium) Antwerp
20	FW	Tevin Kok	20 October 1996 (aged 24)	35		(South Africa) Kearsney
21	DF	Jethro Eustice	1 November 1989 (aged 31)	128	21	(South Africa) Kearsney
22	DF	Daniel Bell	28 September 1994 (aged 26)	58	11	(Belgium) Daring
23	GK	Rassie Pieterse	20 August 1983 (aged 37)	161		(South Africa) Wanderers Hockey Club
24	MF	Nicholas Spooner	28 August 1991 (aged 29)	26		(Germany) Harvestehuder THC
27	FW	Nqobile Ntuli	15 January 1996 (aged 25)	58	25	(South Africa) University of Pretoria
29	MF	Samkelo Mvimbi	23 January 1999 (aged 22)	14	1	(South Africa) University of Pretoria

Group play

Pos	Team	Pld	W	D	L	GF	GA	GD	Pts	Qualification
1	Belgium	5	4	1	0	26	9	+17	13	Quarter-finals
2	Germany	5	3	0	2	19	10	+9	9	Quarter-finals
3	Great Britain	5	2	2	1	11	11	0	8	Quarter-finals
4	Netherlands	5	2	1	2	13	13	0	7	Quarter-finals
5	South Africa	5	1	1	3	16	24	−8	4	
6	Canada	5	0	1	4	9	27	−18	1	

Source: Tokyo 2020 and FIH
Rules for classification: 1) points; 2) matches won; 3) goal difference; 4) goals for; 5) head-to-head result; 6) field goals scored.

24 July 2021
18:30
v

Great Britain	3–1	South Africa
Ward 2'; Ansell 32'; Waller 56'	Report	Guise-Brown 4'

North Pitch
Umpires:
Germán Montes de Oca (ARG)
Ben Goentgen (GER)

25 July 2021
21:15
v

South Africa	3–5	Netherlands
M. Cassiem 2'; D. Cassiem 10'; Kok 18'	Report	Pruyser 24', 54'; Van Dam 29'; Brinkman 36'; Van der Weerden 48'

South Pitch
Umpires:
Jakub Mejzlík (CZE)
Javed Shaikh (IND)

27 July 2021
18:30
v

Belgium	9–4	South Africa
Dohmen 4', 15'; Hendrickx 9', 18', 40'; Briels 12'; Van Doren 15'; Gougnard 25'; Charlier 41'	Report	D. Cassiem 5', 31'; M. Cassiem 23'; Ntuli 29'

North Pitch
Umpires:
Raghu Prasad (IND)
Francisco Vázquez (ESP)

29 July 2021
11:45
v

South Africa	4–3	Germany
Guise-Brown 9'; Horne 13'; Spooner 45'; M. Cassiem 48'	Report	Herzbruch 8'; Windfeder 22'; Staib 24'

North Pitch
Umpires:
David Tomlinson (NZL)
Javed Shaikh (IND)

30 July 2021
12:15
v

Canada	4–4	South Africa
Pearson 11'; K. Pereira 17'; Boothroyd 42'; Ho-Garcia 59'	Report	Ntuli 2'; Spooner 9'; Guise-Brown 34'; Mvimbi 58'

South Pitch
Umpires:
Germán Montes de Oca (ARG)
Raghu Prasad (IND)

=== Women's tournament ===
South Africa women's field hockey team qualified for the Olympics by winning the 2019 Women's African Olympic Qualifier in Stellenbosch.

Team roster

The squad was announced on 27 May 2021.

Head coach: Robin Van Ginkel

No.	Pos.	Player	Date of birth (age)	Caps	Goals	Club
1	GK	Phumelela Mbande	8 March 1993 (aged 28)	47	{{{goals}}}	(South Africa) Northern Blues
3	FW	Celia Seerane	18 June 1990 (aged 31)	163	{{{goals}}}	(South Africa) Northern Blues
4	DF	Nicole Walraven	12 December 1994 (aged 26)	48	{{{goals}}}	(South Africa) Northern Blues
5	FW	Edith Molikoe	23 May 2000 (aged 21)	0	{{{goals}}}	(South Africa) Northern Blues
6	DF	Taryn Potts	19 April 1992 (aged 29)	5	{{{goals}}}	(South Africa) Southern Gauteng
7	MF	Marizen Marais	17 May 1996 (aged 25)	27	{{{goals}}}	(South Africa) Blyde River Bunters
8	MF	Kristen Paton	21 December 1996 (aged 24)	33	{{{goals}}}	(South Africa) Southern Gauteng
9	MF	Robyn Johnson	7 December 1990 (aged 30)	18	{{{goals}}}	(South Africa) Southern Gauteng
10	MF	Onthatile Zulu	14 March 2000 (aged 21)	10	{{{goals}}}	(South Africa) Northern Blues
13	DF	Lisa-Marié Deetlefs	8 September 1987 (aged 33)	267	{{{goals}}}	(South Africa) Southern Gauteng
14	FW	Nomnikelo Veto	3 January 1997 (aged 24)	18	{{{goals}}}	(South Africa) Southern Gauteng
16	MF	Erin Hunter (Captain)	20 March 1992 (aged 29)	59	{{{goals}}}	(South Africa) Southern Gauteng
17	FW	Charné Maddocks	10 June 1998 (aged 23)	0	{{{goals}}}	(South Africa) North-West University
19	MF	Lilian du Plessis	17 December 1992 (aged 28)	135	{{{goals}}}	(South Africa) Southern Gauteng
22	DF	Lerato Mahole	29 December 1999 (aged 21)	0	{{{goals}}}	(South Africa) Namaqualand Daisies
28	FW	Quanita Bobbs	3 September 1993 (aged 27)	132	{{{goals}}}	(South Africa) Western Province
29	DF	Tarryn Glasby	23 January 1995 (aged 26)	42	{{{goals}}}	(South Africa) Western Province
30	FW	Toni Marks	19 July 1994 (aged 27)	16	{{{goals}}}	(South Africa) Madikwe Rangers

Group play

Pos	Team	Pld	W	D	L	GF	GA	GD	Pts	Qualification
1	Netherlands	5	5	0	0	18	2	+16	15	Quarterfinals
2	Germany	5	4	0	1	13	7	+6	12	Quarterfinals
3	Great Britain	5	3	0	2	11	5	+6	9	Quarterfinals
4	India	5	2	0	3	7	14	−7	6	Quarterfinals
5	Ireland	5	1	0	4	4	11	−7	3	
6	South Africa	5	0	0	5	5	19	−14	0	

Source: Tokyo 2020 and FIH
Rules for classification: 1) points; 2) matches won; 3) goal difference; 4) goals for; 5) head-to-head result; 6) field goals scored.

24 July 2021
21:15
v

Ireland	2–0	South Africa
Upton 9'; Torrans 45'	Report

South Pitch
Umpires:
Kelly Hudson (NZL)
Emi Yamada (JPN)

26 July 2021
18:30
v

South Africa	1–4	Great Britain
Walraven 6'	Report	Rayer 29', 50'; Toman 39'; Unsworth 40'

North Pitch
Umpires:
Carolina de la Fuente (ARG)
Maggie Giddens (USA)

28 July 2021
09:30
v

Netherlands	5–0	South Africa
Matla 16', 35'; Keetels 42'; Albers 52'; Verschoor 55'	Report

North Pitch
Umpires:
Amber Church (NZL)
Ayanna McClean (TTO)

30 July 2021
09:30
v

South Africa	1–4	Germany
Marks 53'	Report	Altenburg 2', 24'; Zimmermann 10'; Schröder 49'

North Pitch
Umpires:
Emi Yamada (JPN)
Maggie Giddens (USA)

31 July 2021
12:15
v

India	4–3	South Africa
Vandana 4', 17', 49'; Neha 32'	Report	Glasby 15'; Hunter 30'; Marais 39'

South Pitch
Umpires:
Amber Church (NZL)
Liu Xiaoying (CHN)

== Football (soccer) ==
Summary

Key:

- A.E.T – After extra time.
- P – Match decided by penalty-shootout.

Team	Event	Group Stage				Quarterfinal	Semifinal	Final / BM	
Team	Event	Opposition Score	Opposition Score	Opposition Score	Rank	Opposition Score	Opposition Score	Opposition Score	Rank
South Africa men's	Men's tournament	Japan; L 0–1	France; L 3–4	Mexico; L 0–3	4	Did not advance			

=== Men's tournament ===
South Africa men's football team qualified for the Games by winning the bronze medal and securing the last of three available berths of the 2019 Africa U-23 Cup of Nations.

Team roster

South Africa's final squad was announced on 3 July 2021.

Head coach: David Notoane

No.	Pos.	Player	Date of birth (age)	Club
1	GK	Ronwen Williams*	21 January 1992 (aged 29)	(South African Football Association) SuperSport United
2	DF	James Monyane	30 April 2000 (aged 21)	(South African Football Association) Orlando Pirates
3	DF	Katlego Mohamme	10 March 1998 (aged 23)	(South African Football Association) University of Pretoria
4	MF	Teboho Mokoena	24 January 1997 (aged 24)	(South African Football Association) SuperSport United
5	DF	Luke Fleurs	3 March 2000 (aged 21)	(South African Football Association) SuperSport United
6	MF	Kamohelo Mahlatsi	23 August 1998 (aged 22)	(South African Football Association) Moroka Swallows
7	MF	Nkosingiphile Ngcobo	16 November 1999 (aged 21)	(South African Football Association) Kaizer Chiefs
8	MF	Thabo Cele	15 January 1997 (aged 24)	(Portuguese Football Federation) Cova Piedade
9	FW	Evidence Makgopa	5 June 2000 (aged 21)	(South African Football Association) Baroka
10	FW	Luther Singh	5 August 1997 (aged 23)	(Portuguese Football Federation) Paços de Ferreira
11	DF	MacBeth Mahlangu	11 October 2001 (aged 19)	(South African Football Association) TS Galaxy
12	MF	Goodman Mosele	18 November 1999 (aged 21)	(South African Football Association) Baroka
13	DF	Reeve Frosler	11 January 1998 (aged 23)	(South African Football Association) Kaizer Chiefs
14	DF	Sibusiso Mabiliso	14 April 1999 (aged 22)	(South African Football Association) AmaZulu
15	DF	Tercious Malepe (captain)	18 February 1997 (aged 24)	(Ukrainian Association of Football) Mynai
16	GK	Mondli Mpoto	24 July 1998 (aged 22)	(South African Football Association) Bloemfontein Celtic
17	DF	Thendo Mukumela	30 January 1998 (aged 23)	(South African Football Association) Cape Town Spurs
18	FW	Kobamelo Kodisang	28 August 1999 (aged 21)	(Portuguese Football Federation) Braga
22	GK	Sifiso Mlungwana	27 April 1997 (aged 24)	(South African Football Association) Lamontville Golden Arrows

* Overage player.

Group play

Pos	Team	Pld	W	D	L	GF	GA	GD	Pts	Qualification
1	Japan (H)	3	3	0	0	7	1	+6	9	Advance to knockout stage
2	Mexico	3	2	0	1	8	3	+5	6	Advance to knockout stage
3	France	3	1	0	2	5	11	−6	3	
4	South Africa	3	0	0	3	3	8	−5	0	

Source: TOCOG and FIFA
Rules for classification: Group stage tiebreakers
(H) Hosts
22 July 2021
20:00

Japan	1–0	South Africa
Kubo 71'	Report (TOCOG); Report (FIFA)

Tokyo Stadium, Chōfu
Referee: Jesús Valenzuela (Venezuela)

25 July 2021
17:00

France	4–3	South Africa
Gignac 57', 78', 86' (pen.); Savanier 90+2'	Report (TOCOG); Report (FIFA)	Kodisang 53'; Makgopa 73'; Mokoena 82'

Saitama Stadium 2002, Saitama
Referee: Kevin Ortega (Peru)

28 July 2021
20:30

South Africa	0–3	Mexico
	Report (TOCOG); Report (FIFA)	Vega 18'; Romo 45+1'; Martín 60'

Sapporo Dome, Sapporo
Referee: Matthew Conger (New Zealand)

== Golf ==
South Africa entered two golfers (both men) into the Olympic tournament. Christiaan Bezuidenhout (world no. 46), Garrick Higgo (world no. 38), and Ashleigh Buhai (world no. 76) qualified directly among the top 60 eligible players for their respective events based on the IGF World Rankings. Louis Oosthuizen and Lee-Anne Pace were initially selected but opted not to play. Ashleigh Buhai later withdrew and was replaced by Paula Reto who also withdrew.

Athlete	Event	Round 1	Round 2	Round 3	Round 4	Total		
Athlete	Event	Score	Score	Score	Score	Score	Par	Rank
Christiaan Bezuidenhout	Men's	68	70	68	67	273	−7	=16
Garrick Higgo	Men's	71	71	70	72	284	E	=53

== Gymnastics ==
=== Artistic ===
South Africa entered two artistic gymnast into the Olympic competition. Caitlin Rooskrantz received a spare berth from the women's apparatus events, as one of the twelve highest-ranked gymnasts, neither part of the team nor qualified directly through the all-around, at the 2019 World Championships in Stuttgart, Germany. Meanwhile, Naveen Daries claimed an additional place to join Rooskrantz on the South African squad with a bronze-medal finish in the women's individual all-around at the 2021 African Championships in Cairo, Egypt.

Women

Athlete	Event	Qualification						Final					
Athlete	Event	Apparatus				Total	Rank	Apparatus				Total	Rank
Athlete	Event	V	UB	BB	F	Total	Rank	V	UB	BB	F	Total	Rank
Naveen Daries	All-around	13.300	12.366	8.933	11.766	46.365	76	Did not advance					
Caitlin Rooskrantz	All-around	12.800	13.300	12.200	11.633	49.933	61	Did not advance					

== Judo ==
South Africa qualified one judoka for the women's extra-lightweight category (48 kg) at the Games. Geronay Whitebooi received a continental berth from Africa as the nation's top-ranked judoka outside of direct qualifying position in the IJF World Ranking List of June 28, 2021.

Athlete	Event	Round of 32	Round of 16	Quarterfinals	Semifinals	Repechage	Final / BM	
Athlete	Event	Opposition Result	Opposition Result	Opposition Result	Opposition Result	Opposition Result	Opposition Result	Rank
Geronay Whitebooi	Women's −48 kg	Pareto (ARG); L 001–100	Did not advance					

== Rowing ==
South Africa qualified one boat in the men's pair by finishing third in the B-final and securing ninth out of eleven berths available at the 2019 FISA World Championships in Ottensheim, Austria. Meanwhile, the men's coxless four rowers were added to the South African roster with their top-two finish at the 2021 FISA Final Qualification Regatta in Lucerne, Switzerland.

Athlete	Event	Heats		Repechage		Semifinals		Final	
Athlete	Event	Time	Rank	Time	Rank	Time	Rank	Time	Rank
Luc Daffarn; Jake Green	Men's pair	7:04.03	5 R	6:57.01	4	Did not advance			
Lawrence Brittain; Kyle Schoonbee; John Smith; Sandro Torrente	Men's four	6:25.34	5 R	6:30.34	6 FB	—N/a		6:09.85	10

Qualification Legend: FA=Final A (medal); FB=Final B (non-medal); FC=Final C (non-medal); FD=Final D (non-medal); FE=Final E (non-medal); FF=Final F (non-medal); SA/B=Semifinals A/B; SC/D=Semifinals C/D; SE/F=Semifinals E/F; QF=Quarterfinals; R=Repechage

== Rugby sevens ==
Summary

Team	Event	Group stage				Quarterfinal/ Classification	Semifinal/ Classification	Final / BM	
Team	Event	Opposition Score	Opposition Score	Opposition Score	Rank	Opposition Score	Opposition Score	Opposition Score	Rank
South Africa men's	Men's tournament	Ireland; W 33–14	Kenya; W 14–5	United States; W 17–12	1 Q	Argentina; L 19–14	Australia; W 22–19	United States; W 28–7	5

=== Men's tournament ===
The South Africa national rugby sevens team qualified by advancing to the quarterfinals in the 2019 London Sevens, securing a top four spot in the 2018–19 World Rugby Sevens Series.

Team roster

South Africa's 12-man squad plus one alternate was named on 6 July 2021.

Head coach: Neil Powell

No.	Pos.	Player	Date of birth (age)	Events	Points
1	FW	Chris Dry	13 February 1988 (aged 33)	74	490
2	FW	Sako Makata	10 September 1998 (aged 22)	9	20
3	FW	Impi Visser	30 May 1995 (aged 26)	13	65
4	FW	Zain Davids	4 May 1997 (aged 24)	22	80
5	FW	Angelo Davids	1 June 1999 (aged 22)	6	90
6	FW	JC Pretorius	29 January 1998 (aged 23)	10	120
7	BK	Branco du Preez	8 May 1990 (aged 31)	75	1,355
8	BK	Selvyn Davids	26 March 1994 (aged 27)	20	409
9	BK	Justin Geduld	1 October 1993 (aged 27)	50	1,034
10	BK	Kurt-Lee Arendse	17 June 1996 (aged 25)	8	70
11	BK	Siviwe Soyizwapi (c)	7 December 1992 (aged 28)	30	465
12	BK	Stedman Gans	19 March 1997 (aged 24)	22	170
13	BK	Ronald Brown	2 September 1995 (aged 25)	0	0

Group play

Pos	Team	Pld	W	D	L	PF	PA	PD	Pts	Qualification
1	South Africa	3	3	0	0	64	31	+33	9	Quarter-finals
2	United States	3	2	0	1	50	48	+2	7	Quarter-finals
3	Ireland	3	1	0	2	43	59	−16	5	
4	Kenya	3	0	0	3	26	45	−19	3	

Updated to match(es) played on 26 July 2021. Source: Tokyo 2020 and World Rugby
Rules for classification: 1) Points; 2) Head-to-head result; 3) Point difference; 4) Points scored.

26 July 2021
11:00

South Africa	33–14	Ireland
Try: Z. Davids 2' c Visser 6' c Geduld 8' c Dry 12' c Gans 13' m Con: S. Davids (4/5) 2', 6', 8', 12'	(Tokyo 2020)	Try: Mullin 7' c Kennedy 10' c Con: Dardis (2/2) 7', 10'

Tokyo Stadium, Tokyo
Attendance: 0
Referee: Craig Evans (Wales)

26 July 2021
19:00

South Africa	14–5	Kenya
Try: S. Davids 2' c Soyizwapi 3' c Con: du Preez (2/2) 2', 4'	(Tokyo 2020)	Try: Injera 6' m Con: Agero (0/1)

Tokyo Stadium, Tokyo
Attendance: 0
Referee: Damon Murphy (Australia)

27 July 2021
11:30

South Africa	17–12	United States
Try: S. Davids (2) 6' m, 10' m Gans 8' c Con: S. Davids (1/3) 9'	(Tokyo 2020)	Try: Schroeder 1' m Thompson 12' c Con: Melphy (0/1); Hughes (1/1) 13'

Tokyo Stadium, Tokyo
Attendance: 0
Referee: Craig Evans (Wales)

Quarterfinals

27 July 2021
18:30

South Africa	14–19	Argentina
Try: S. Davids 1' c Penalty try 13'; Con: Geduld (1/1) 1'	(Tokyo 2020)	Try: Moneta (2) 4' c, 7' c Álvarez 12' m Con: Mare (2/2) 5', 7'; Bazán (0/1)

Tokyo Stadium, Tokyo
Attendance: 0
Referee: Damon Murphy (Australia)

Semifinals

28 July 2021
10:30

South Africa	22–19	Australia
Try: Soyizwapi 1' m Brown (2) 5' m, 7' c Pretorius 11' m Con: Brown (0/1); Geduld (1/2) 7' du Preez (0/1)	(Tokyo 2020)	Try: Miller 8' c Turner 10' m Longbottom 12' c Con: Miller (1/1) 9'; Coward (0/1); Longbottom (1/1) 13'

Tokyo Stadium, Tokyo
Attendance: 0
Referee: Craig Evans (Wales)

Fifth place match

28 July 2021
17:00

United States	7–28	South Africa
Try: Tomasin 4' c Con: Hughes (1/1) 4'	(Tokyo 2020)	Try: Geduld 2' c Makata 7' c Arendse 12' c Gans 14' c Con: Brown (2/2) 2', 7' du Preez (2/2) 13', 14'

Tokyo Stadium, Tokyo
Attendance: 0
Referee: Sam Grove-White (Scotland)

== Sailing ==
South African sailors qualified one boat in each of the following classes through the 2018 Sailing World Championships, the class-associated Worlds, and the continental regattas.

Athlete	Event	Race													Net points	Final rank
Athlete	Event	1	2	3	4	5	6	7	8	9	10	11	12	M*	Net points	Final rank
Leo Davis	Men's Finn	17	~~19~~	19	19	18	19	12	18	18	19	—N/a		EL	159	19
Alex Burger; Benjamin Talbot	Men's 49er	13	15	18	17	17	14	12	13	17	10	~~19~~	17	EL	163	19

M = Medal race; EL = Eliminated – did not advance into the medal race

== Skateboarding ==
South Africa entered four skateboarders (two per gender) to compete across all events at the Games. Dallas Oberholtzer (men's park), Brandon Valjalo (men's street), Melissa Williams (women's park), and Boipelo Awuah (women's street) granted an invitation from the World Skate as the highest-ranked skateboarders from Africa vying for qualification in the street and park events based on their performances in the federation's Olympic Rankings of June 30, 2021.

Athlete	Event	Qualification		Final	
Athlete	Event	Opposition Result	Rank	Opposition Result	Rank
Dallas Oberholtzer	Men's park	24.08	20	Did not advance	
Brandon Valjalo	Men's street	16.41	18	Did not advance	
Melissa Williams	Women's park	8.30	20	Did not advance	
Boipelo Awuah	Women's street	Withdrew due to injury			

== Sport climbing ==
South Africa entered two sport climbers into the Olympic tournament. Erin Sterkenburg and Christopher Cosser qualified directly for the women's and men's combined events, respectively, by advancing to the final stage and eventually winning the gold medal at the 2020 IFSC African Championships in Cape Town.

Athlete	Event	Qualification									Final								
Athlete	Event	Speed		Boulder		Lead			Total	Rank	Speed		Boulder		Lead			Total	Rank
Athlete	Event	Best	Place	Result	Place	Hold	Time	Place	Total	Rank	Best	Place	Result	Place	Hold	Time	Place	Total	Rank
Christopher Cosser	Men's	6.48	9	0T2z 0 15	16	29	—	10	1440.00	16	Did not advance								
Erin Sterkenburg	Women's	11.10	20	0T1z 0 1	17	7+	—	20	6800.00	20	Did not advance								

== Surfing ==
South Africa sent two surfers (one per gender) to compete in their respective shortboard races at the Games. Bianca Buitendag secured a qualification slot for her nation in the women's shortboard as the highest-ranked and last remaining surfer from Africa at the 2019 ISA World Surfing Games in Miyazaki, Japan. On the men's side, Jordy Smith finished within the top ten of those eligible for qualification in the World Surf League rankings to join Buitendag on the South African roster for Tokyo 2020.

Athlete	Event	Round 1		Round 2		Round 3	Quarterfinal	Semifinal	Final / BM	
Athlete	Event	Points	Rank	Points	Rank	Opposition Result	Opposition Result	Opposition Result	Opposition Result	Rank
Bianca Buitendag	Women's shortboard	11.44	3 q	10.40	2 Q	Gilmore (AUS); W 13.93–10.00	Hopkins (POR); W 9.50–5.46	Marks (USA); W 11.00–3.67	Moore (USA); L 8.46–14.93	2nd place, silver medalist(s)

== Swimming ==
Seventeen South African swimmers achieved qualifying standards in the following events (up to a maximum of two swimmers in each event at the Olympic Qualifying Time (OQT), and potentially one at the Olympic Selection Time (OST)): To assure their selection to the Olympic team, swimmers must attain an Olympic qualifying cut in each individual pool event at the 2021 South African National Championships (April 8 to 12) in Johannesburg.

Seventeen swimmers (eight men and nine women) were officially named to the South African roster for the Games on June 24, 2021, including London 2012 gold medalist Chad Le Clos in the men's butterfly double and 2019 world silver medalist and national record holder Tatjana Schoenmaker in the women's breaststroke double.

Men

Athlete	Event	Heat		Semifinal		Final	
Athlete	Event	Time	Rank	Time	Rank	Time	Rank
Martin Binedell	200 m backstroke	1:58.47	21	Did not advance			
Pieter Coetze	100 m backstroke	54.05	24	Did not advance			
Ethan du Preez	200 m butterfly	1:58.50	30	Did not advance			
Michael Houlie	100 m breaststroke	1:01.22	37	Did not advance			
Chad Le Clos	100 m butterfly	51.89	=18	Did not advance			
Chad Le Clos	200 m butterfly	1:55.96	16 Q	1:55.06	3 Q	1:54.93	5
Michael McGlynn	10 km open water	—N/a				1:51:32.7	8
Matthew Sates	100 m butterfly	52.34	32	Did not advance			
Matthew Sates	200 m individual medley	1:58.08	15 Q	1:58.75	14	Did not advance	
Brad Tandy	50 m freestyle	22.22	=24	Did not advance			

Women

Athlete	Event	Heat		Semifinal		Final	
Athlete	Event	Time	Rank	Time	Rank	Time	Rank
Emma Chelius	50 m freestyle	24.65	=11 Q	24.64	13	Did not advance	
Kaylene Corbett	200 m breaststroke	2:22.48	4 Q	2:22.08	4 Q	2:22.06	5
Erin Gallagher	100 m butterfly	59.69	26	Did not advance			
Erin Gallagher	100 m freestyle	54.75	25	Did not advance			
Rebecca Meder	200 m individual medley	2:14.79	23	Did not advance			
Tatjana Schoenmaker	100 m breaststroke	1:04.82 OR	1 Q	1:05.07	1 Q	1:05.22	2nd place, silver medalist(s)
Tatjana Schoenmaker	200 m breaststroke	2:19.16 OR	1 Q	2:19.33	1 Q	2:18.95 WR	1st place, gold medalist(s)
Michelle Weber	10 km open water	—N/a				2:06:56.5	21
Aimee Canny; Duné Coetzee; Erin Gallagher; Rebecca Meder	4 × 200 m freestyle relay	8:01.56	11	—N/a		Did not advance	
Aimee Canny; Erin Gallagher; Tatjana Schoenmaker; Mariella Venter	4 × 100 m medley relay	4:03.02	14	—N/a		Did not advance	

== Triathlon ==
Individual

Athlete	Event	Time						Rank
Athlete	Event	Swim (1.5 km)	Trans 1	Bike (40 km)	Trans 2	Run (10 km)	Total	Rank
Henri Schoeman	Men's	17:55	0:45	56:41	0:28	Did not finish		
Simone Ackermann	Women's	19:08	0:45	1:03:17	0:34	37:30	2:01:14	17
Gillian Sanders	Women's	20:18	0:45	Lapped				

== Water polo ==
South Africa qualified to compete in the men's water polo tournament for the first time since Rome 1960, and in the women's water polo tournament for the first time ever.

Summary

Key:
- FT – After full time.
- P – Match decided by penalty-shootout.

Team	Event	Group stage						Quarterfinal	Semifinal	Final / BM	
Team	Event	Opposition Score	Opposition Score	Opposition Score	Opposition Score	Opposition Score	Rank	Opposition Score	Opposition Score	Opposition Score	Rank
South Africa men's	Men's tournament	Italy; L 2–21	United States; L 3–20	Hungary; L 1–23	Greece; L 5–28	Japan; L 9–24	6	Did not advance			
South Africa women's	Women's tournament	Spain; L 4–29	Canada; L 1–21	Netherlands; L 1–31	Australia; L 1–14	—N/a	5	Did not advance			

=== Men's tournament ===
Team roster

South Africa's squad was announced on 24 June 2021. Roarke Olver was replaced by Timothy Rezelman.

Head coach: Paul Martin

No.	Player	Pos.	L/R	Height	Weight	Date of birth (age)	Apps	OG/ Goals	Club	Ref
1	Lwazi Madi (C)	GK	R			12 December 1994 (aged 26)	35	0/0	(South Africa) Stellenbosch University	
2	Devon Card	CF	R	1.86 m (6 ft 1 in)	110 kg (243 lb)	25 February 1991 (aged 30)	60	0/0	(South Africa) SACS Old Boys	
3	Timothy Rezelman	D	R			13 January 1995 (aged 26)	6	0/0	(South Africa) OJ Eagles	
4	Ignardus Badenhorst	CF	R	1.98 m (6 ft 6 in)	112 kg (247 lb)	26 August 1990 (aged 30)	61	0/0	(South Africa) OJ Eagles	
5	Cameron Laurenson	CB	R			28 April 1998 (aged 23)	37	0/0	(South Africa) Maties (Stellenbosch)	
6	Ross Stone	D	R			15 May 2000 (aged 21)	30	0/0	(South Africa) Stellenbosch University	
7	Jason Evezard	D	R			17 August 1997 (aged 23)	14	0/0	(South Africa) Maties (Stellenbosch)	
8	Nicholas Rodda	D	R	1.89 m (6 ft 2 in)	86 kg (190 lb)	11 October 1992 (aged 28)	30	0/0	(South Africa) OJ Eagles	
9	Yaseen Margro	D	R			12 February 2000 (aged 21)	14	0/0	(South Africa) KNZ (Durban)	
10	Farouk Mayman	CB	R			3 May 1999 (aged 22)	7	0/0	(South Africa) RWC (Cape Town)	
11	Liam Neill	CF	R			26 October 1997 (aged 23)	35	0/0	(South Africa) University of Cape Town	
12	Donn Stewart	CB	R	1.91 m (6 ft 3 in)		22 August 1980 (aged 40)	90	0/0	(South Africa) Clifton (Durban)	
13	Gareth May	GK	R			9 November 1996 (aged 24)	14	0/0	(South Africa) Team Walrus	
Average						26 years, 185 days	33			

Note: Age as of 23 July 2021
Source: South Africa Men | Tokyo 2020 Olympics Archived 2021-07-22 at the Wayback Machine

Group play

Pos	Team	Pld	W	D	L	GF	GA	GD	Pts	Qualification
1	Greece	5	4	1	0	68	34	+34	9	Quarterfinals
2	Italy	5	3	2	0	60	32	+28	8	Quarterfinals
3	Hungary	5	3	1	1	64	35	+29	7	Quarterfinals
4	United States	5	2	0	3	59	53	+6	4	Quarterfinals
5	Japan (H)	5	1	0	4	65	66	−1	2	
6	South Africa	5	0	0	5	20	116	−96	0	

Source: Tokyo 2020 and FINA
Rules for classification: 1) Points; 2) Head-to-head points; 3) Head-to-head goal difference; 4) Head-to-head goals scored; 5) Goal difference.
(H) Hosts

25 July 2021; 10:00 v	Report	South Africa	2–21	Italy	Tokyo Tatsumi International Swimming Center; Referees: Viktor Salnichenko (KAZ), Stanko Ivanovski (MNE)
25 July 2021; 10:00 v	Report	Score by quarters: 0–2, 2–8, 0–7, 0–4			Tokyo Tatsumi International Swimming Center; Referees: Viktor Salnichenko (KAZ), Stanko Ivanovski (MNE)
25 July 2021; 10:00 v	Report	Rezelman, Stone 1	Goals	Di Fulvio 5	Tokyo Tatsumi International Swimming Center; Referees: Viktor Salnichenko (KAZ), Stanko Ivanovski (MNE)

27 July 2021; 10:00 v	Report	South Africa	3–20	United States	Tokyo Tatsumi International Swimming Center; Referees: Zhang Liang (CHN), Vojin Putniković (SRB)
27 July 2021; 10:00 v	Report	Score by quarters: 0–3, 1–9, 1–3, 1–5			Tokyo Tatsumi International Swimming Center; Referees: Zhang Liang (CHN), Vojin Putniković (SRB)
27 July 2021; 10:00 v	Report	three players 1	Goals	Hallock 4	Tokyo Tatsumi International Swimming Center; Referees: Zhang Liang (CHN), Vojin Putniković (SRB)

29 July 2021; 10:00 v	Report	Hungary	23–1	South Africa	Tokyo Tatsumi International Swimming Center; Referees: Daniel Daners (URU), Germán Moller (ARG)
29 July 2021; 10:00 v	Report	Score by quarters: 4–0, 5–0, 8–0, 6–1			Tokyo Tatsumi International Swimming Center; Referees: Daniel Daners (URU), Germán Moller (ARG)
29 July 2021; 10:00 v	Report	Manhercz 5	Goals	Rodda 1	Tokyo Tatsumi International Swimming Center; Referees: Daniel Daners (URU), Germán Moller (ARG)

31 July 2021; 19:50 v	Report	South Africa	5–28	Greece	Tokyo Tatsumi International Swimming Center; Referees: John Waldow (NZL), Zhang Liang (CHN)
31 July 2021; 19:50 v	Report	Score by quarters: 1–7, 2–5, 1–7, 1–9			Tokyo Tatsumi International Swimming Center; Referees: John Waldow (NZL), Zhang Liang (CHN)
31 July 2021; 19:50 v	Report	Stone 2	Goals	Fountoulis 5	Tokyo Tatsumi International Swimming Center; Referees: John Waldow (NZL), Zhang Liang (CHN)

2 August 2021; 18:20 v	Report	Japan	24–9	South Africa	Tokyo Tatsumi International Swimming Center; Referees: John Waldow (NZL), Vojin Putniković (SRB)
2 August 2021; 18:20 v	Report	Score by quarters: 5–4, 7–4, 6–1, 6–0			Tokyo Tatsumi International Swimming Center; Referees: John Waldow (NZL), Vojin Putniković (SRB)
2 August 2021; 18:20 v	Report	Adachi, Arai 4	Goals	Neill 4	Tokyo Tatsumi International Swimming Center; Referees: John Waldow (NZL), Vojin Putniković (SRB)

=== Women's tournament ===
Team roster

South Africa's squad was announced on 24 June 2021. Daniela Passoni and Kelsey White were replaced by Hannah Calvert and Nicola Macleod.

Head coach: Delaine Mentoor

No.	Player	Pos.	L/R	Height	Weight	Date of birth (age)	Apps	OG/ Goals	Club	Ref
1	Meghan Maartens	GK	L			8 April 1999 (aged 22)	18	0/0	(South Africa) Madibaz	
2	Yanah Gerber	CF	R			16 March 2001 (aged 20)	15	0/0	(South Africa) MantaRays	
3	Georgie Moir	CB	R			5 December 1997 (aged 23)	22	0/0	(South Africa) Western Warriors	
4	Boati Motau	D	L			25 September 2002 (aged 18)	16	0/0	(South Africa) OJ Eagles	
5	Megan Sileno	CF	R	1.82 m (6 ft 0 in)	82 kg (181 lb)	1 May 1989 (aged 32)	45	0/0	(South Africa) Stingrays	
6	Amica Hallenndorff	D	R	1.64 m (5 ft 5 in)	60 kg (132 lb)	26 October 1992 (aged 28)	49	0/0	(South Africa) Western Warriors	
7	Shakira January	CB	R			15 November 2002 (aged 18)	15	0/0	(South Africa) Tridents	
8	Ashleigh Vaughn	D	R			17 May 1999 (aged 22)	13	0/0	(South Africa) Madibaz	
9	Hannah Muller	D	R			16 November 1999 (aged 21)	44	0/0	(South Africa) Eagles	
10	Jordan Wedderburn (C)	D	R			30 December 2002 (aged 18)	27	0/0	(South Africa) Water Warriors	
11	Chloe Meecham	CB	R			16 February 1999 (aged 22)	55	0/0	(South Africa) High Performance	
12	Nicola Macleod	D	R			14 May 1997 (aged 24)	33	0/0	(South Africa) Stingrays	
13	Hannah Calvert	GK	R			27 November 1997 (aged 23)	17	0/0	(South Africa) Stellenbosch University	
Average						22 years, 321 days	28			

Note: Age as of 23 July 2021
Source: South Africa Women | Tokyo 2020 Olympics Archived 2021-07-22 at the Wayback Machine

Group play

Pos	Team	Pld	W	D	L	GF	GA	GD	Pts	Qualification
1	Spain	4	3	0	1	71	37	+34	6 (Note: Spain 2 Pts, +5 GD; Netherlands 2 Pts, −2 GD; Australia 2 Pts, −3 GD. Spain first and after that the head-to head results between Australia and Netherlands (15–12) came into effect.)	Quarterfinals
2	Australia	4	3	0	1	46	33	+13	6	Quarterfinals
3	Netherlands	4	3	0	1	75	41	+34	6	Quarterfinals
4	Canada	4	1	0	3	48	39	+9	2	Quarterfinals
5	South Africa	4	0	0	4	7	97	−90	0	

Source: Tokyo 2020 and FINA
Rules for classification: 1) Points; 2) Head-to-head points; 3) Head-to-head goal difference; 4) Head-to-head goals scored; 5) Goal difference.
Notes:

24 July 2021; 18:20 v	Report	South Africa	4–29	Spain	Tokyo Tatsumi International Swimming Center; Referees: Asumi Tsuzaki (JPN), Ursula Wengenroth (SUI)
24 July 2021; 18:20 v	Report	Score by quarters: 2–5, 1–9, 1–5, 0–10			Tokyo Tatsumi International Swimming Center; Referees: Asumi Tsuzaki (JPN), Ursula Wengenroth (SUI)
24 July 2021; 18:20 v	Report	Wedderburn 2	Goals	Ruiz 5	Tokyo Tatsumi International Swimming Center; Referees: Asumi Tsuzaki (JPN), Ursula Wengenroth (SUI)

28 July 2021; 15:30 v	Report	Canada	21–1	South Africa	Tokyo Tatsumi International Swimming Center; Referees: Asumi Tsuzaki (JPN), John Waldow (NZL)
28 July 2021; 15:30 v	Report	Score by quarters: 5–1, 4–0, 4–0, 8–0			Tokyo Tatsumi International Swimming Center; Referees: Asumi Tsuzaki (JPN), John Waldow (NZL)
28 July 2021; 15:30 v	Report	Sohi 4	Goals	Moir 1	Tokyo Tatsumi International Swimming Center; Referees: Asumi Tsuzaki (JPN), John Waldow (NZL)

30 July 2021; 14:00 v	Report	South Africa	1–33	Netherlands	Tokyo Tatsumi International Swimming Center; Referees: Nicola Johnson (AUS), Ursula Wengenroth (SUI)
30 July 2021; 14:00 v	Report	Score by quarters: 0–7, 0–9, 1–9, 0–8			Tokyo Tatsumi International Swimming Center; Referees: Nicola Johnson (AUS), Ursula Wengenroth (SUI)
30 July 2021; 14:00 v	Report	Wedderburn 1	Goals	Keuning 6	Tokyo Tatsumi International Swimming Center; Referees: Nicola Johnson (AUS), Ursula Wengenroth (SUI)

1 August 2021; 19:50 v	Report	Australia	14–1	South Africa	Tokyo Tatsumi International Swimming Center; Referees: Daniel Daners (URU), Jeremy Cheng (SGP)
1 August 2021; 19:50 v	Report	Score by quarters: 1–0, 6–1, 4–0, 3–0			Tokyo Tatsumi International Swimming Center; Referees: Daniel Daners (URU), Jeremy Cheng (SGP)
1 August 2021; 19:50 v	Report	five players 2	Goals	Vaughan 1	Tokyo Tatsumi International Swimming Center; Referees: Daniel Daners (URU), Jeremy Cheng (SGP)

== See also ==
- South Africa at the 2020 Summer Paralympics
