= Football at the 2020 Summer Olympics – Men's team squads =

The men's football tournament at the 2020 Summer Olympics was an international football tournament in Japan from 22 July to 7 August 2021. The sixteen participating national teams were required to submit squads of 18 players – of which two have to be goalkeepers – by 30 June 2021, 23 days prior to the opening match of the tournament. At least fifteen of the players had to be born on or after 1 January 1997, and three of whom could be older dispensation players. Additionally, teams could name a maximum of four alternate players, numbered from 19 to 22. The alternate list could contain at most three outfielders, as at least one slot was reserved for a goalkeeper. In the event that a player on the submitted squad list suffered an injury or illness, that player would have been able to be replaced by one of the players in the alternate list. Only players in these squads were planned to be eligible to take part in the tournament. On 2 July, FIFA confirmed that there was a change for the 2020 Olympics, allowing all 22 players named to be available on the roster, with 18 being named for each match. This change was implemented due to the challenges of the COVID-19 pandemic. The official squad lists were released by FIFA on 7 July 2021.

The age listed for each player is on 22 July 2021, the first day of the tournament. The numbers of caps and goals listed for each player do not include any matches played after the start of the tournament. The club listed is the club for which the player last played a competitive match prior to the tournament. (Note: This is the club a player was last able to play for during the previous season in the event a player did not play a competitive match.) The nationality for each club reflects the national association (not the league) to which the club is affiliated. A flag is included for coaches who are of a different nationality than their own national team.

== Group A ==
=== France ===
France's initial final squad was announced on 25 June 2021. However, after several clubs refused to release their players, a new squad was announced on 2 July 2021, along with additional players to complete the final roster. Before the start of the tournament, Niels Nkounkou was called up to replace the injured Jérémy Gelin.

Head coach: Sylvain Ripoll

No.	Pos.	Player	Date of birth (age)	Club
1	GK	Paul Bernardoni	18 April 1997 (aged 24)	(French Football Federation) Angers
2	DF	Pierre Kalulu	5 June 2000 (aged 21)	(Italian Football Federation) Milan
3	DF	Melvin Bard	6 November 2000 (aged 20)	(French Football Federation) Lyon
4	DF	Timothée Pembélé	9 September 2002 (aged 18)	(French Football Federation) Paris Saint-Germain
5	DF	Niels Nkounkou	1 November 2000 (aged 20)	(The Football Association) Everton
6	MF	Lucas Tousart	29 April 1997 (aged 24)	(German Football Association) Hertha BSC
7	FW	Arnaud Nordin	17 June 1998 (aged 23)	(French Football Federation) Saint-Étienne
8	MF	Enzo Le Fée	3 February 2000 (aged 21)	(French Football Federation) Lorient
9	FW	Nathanaël Mbuku	16 March 2002 (aged 19)	(French Football Federation) Reims
10	FW	André-Pierre Gignac* (captain)	5 December 1985 (aged 35)	(Mexican Football Federation) Tigres UANL
11	MF	Téji Savanier*	22 December 1991 (aged 29)	(French Football Federation) Montpellier
12	MF	Alexis Beka Beka	29 March 2001 (aged 20)	(French Football Federation) Caen
13	DF	Clément Michelin	11 May 1997 (aged 24)	(French Football Federation) Lens
14	FW	Florian Thauvin*	26 January 1993 (aged 28)	(French Football Federation) Marseille
15	DF	Modibo Sagnan	14 April 1999 (aged 22)	(Royal Spanish Football Federation) Real Sociedad
16	GK	Stefan Bajic	23 December 2001 (aged 19)	(French Football Federation) Saint-Étienne
17	DF	Anthony Caci	1 July 1997 (aged 24)	(French Football Federation) Strasbourg
18	FW	Randal Kolo Muani	5 December 1998 (aged 22)	(French Football Federation) Nantes
19	DF	Ismaël Doukouré	24 July 2003 (aged 17)	(French Football Federation) Valenciennes
20	FW	Isaac Lihadji	4 April 2002 (aged 19)	(French Football Federation) Lille
22	GK	Dimitry Bertaud	6 June 1998 (aged 23)	(French Football Federation) Montpellier

* Overage player.

=== Japan ===
Japan's final squad was announced on 22 June 2021.

Head coach: Hajime Moriyasu

No.	Pos.	Player	Date of birth (age)	Club
1	GK	Keisuke Osako	28 July 1999 (aged 21)	(Japan Football Association) Sanfrecce Hiroshima
2	DF	Hiroki Sakai*	12 April 1990 (aged 31)	(French Football Federation) Marseille
3	DF	Yuta Nakayama	16 February 1997 (aged 24)	(Royal Dutch Football Association) PEC Zwolle
4	DF	Ko Itakura	27 January 1997 (aged 24)	(Royal Dutch Football Association) Groningen
5	DF	Maya Yoshida* (captain)	24 August 1988 (aged 32)	(Italian Football Federation) Sampdoria
6	MF	Wataru Endo*	9 February 1993 (aged 28)	(German Football Association) VfB Stuttgart
7	FW	Takefusa Kubo	4 June 2001 (aged 20)	(Royal Spanish Football Federation) Getafe
8	MF	Koji Miyoshi	26 March 1997 (aged 24)	(Royal Belgian Football Association) Antwerp
9	FW	Daizen Maeda	20 October 1997 (aged 23)	(Japan Football Association) Yokohama F. Marinos
10	MF	Ritsu Dōan	16 June 1998 (aged 23)	(German Football Association) Arminia Bielefeld
11	FW	Kaoru Mitoma	20 May 1997 (aged 24)	(Japan Football Association) Kawasaki Frontale
12	GK	Kosei Tani	22 November 2000 (aged 20)	(Japan Football Association) Shonan Bellmare
13	MF	Reo Hatate	21 November 1997 (aged 23)	(Japan Football Association) Kawasaki Frontale
14	DF	Takehiro Tomiyasu	5 November 1998 (aged 22)	(Italian Football Federation) Bologna
15	DF	Daiki Hashioka	17 May 1999 (aged 22)	(Royal Belgian Football Association) Sint-Truiden
16	FW	Yuki Soma	25 February 1997 (aged 24)	(Japan Football Association) Nagoya Grampus
17	MF	Ao Tanaka	10 September 1998 (aged 22)	(Japan Football Association) Kawasaki Frontale
18	FW	Ayase Ueda	28 August 1998 (aged 22)	(Japan Football Association) Kashima Antlers
19	FW	Daichi Hayashi	23 May 1997 (aged 24)	(Japan Football Association) Sagan Tosu
20	DF	Koki Machida	25 August 1997 (aged 23)	(Japan Football Association) Kashima Antlers
21	DF	Ayumu Seko	7 June 2000 (aged 21)	(Japan Football Association) Cerezo Osaka
22	GK	Zion Suzuki	21 August 2002 (aged 18)	(Japan Football Association) Urawa Red Diamonds

* Overage player

=== Mexico ===
Mexico's 22-man final squad was announced on 15 June 2021. On July 4, José Juan Macías withdrew due to injury and was replaced by Adrián Mora.

Head coach: Jaime Lozano

No.	Pos.	Player	Date of birth (age)	Club
1	GK	Luis Malagón	2 March 1997 (aged 24)	(Mexican Football Federation) Necaxa
2	DF	Jorge Sánchez	10 December 1997 (aged 23)	(Mexican Football Federation) América
3	DF	César Montes	24 February 1997 (aged 24)	(Mexican Football Federation) Monterrey
4	DF	Jesús Alberto Angulo	30 January 1998 (aged 23)	(Mexican Football Federation) Atlas
5	DF	Johan Vásquez	22 October 1998 (aged 22)	(Mexican Football Federation) UNAM
6	DF	Vladimir Loroña	16 November 1998 (aged 22)	(Mexican Football Federation) Tijuana
7	MF	Luis Romo*	5 June 1995 (aged 26)	(Mexican Football Federation) Cruz Azul
8	MF	Charly Rodríguez	3 January 1997 (aged 24)	(Mexican Football Federation) Monterrey
9	FW	Henry Martín*	18 November 1992 (aged 28)	(Mexican Football Federation) América
10	FW	Diego Lainez	9 June 2000 (aged 21)	(Royal Spanish Football Federation) Betis
11	FW	Alexis Vega	25 November 1997 (aged 23)	(Mexican Football Federation) Guadalajara
12	DF	Adrián Mora	15 August 1997 (aged 23)	(Mexican Football Federation) Juárez
13	GK	Guillermo Ochoa* (captain)	13 July 1985 (aged 36)	(Mexican Football Federation) América
14	DF	Érick Aguirre	23 February 1997 (aged 24)	(Mexican Football Federation) Pachuca
15	FW	Uriel Antuna	21 August 1997 (aged 23)	(Mexican Football Federation) Guadalajara
16	MF	José Joaquín Esquivel	7 January 1998 (aged 23)	(Mexican Football Federation) Juárez
17	MF	Sebastián Córdova	12 June 1997 (aged 24)	(Mexican Football Federation) América
18	FW	Eduardo Aguirre	3 August 1998 (aged 22)	(Mexican Football Federation) Santos Laguna
19	MF	Jesús Ricardo Angulo	20 February 1997 (aged 24)	(Mexican Football Federation) Guadalajara
20	MF	Fernando Beltrán	8 May 1998 (aged 23)	(Mexican Football Federation) Guadalajara
21	FW	Roberto Alvarado	7 September 1998 (aged 22)	(Mexican Football Federation) Cruz Azul
22	GK	Sebastián Jurado	28 September 1997 (aged 23)	(Mexican Football Federation) Cruz Azul

* Overage player.

=== South Africa ===
South Africa's final squad was announced on 3 July 2021.

Head coach: David Notoane

No.	Pos.	Player	Date of birth (age)	Club
1	GK	Ronwen Williams*	21 January 1992 (aged 29)	(South African Football Association) SuperSport United
2	DF	James Monyane	30 April 2000 (aged 21)	(South African Football Association) Orlando Pirates
3	DF	Katlego Mohamme	10 March 1998 (aged 23)	(South African Football Association) University of Pretoria
4	MF	Teboho Mokoena	24 January 1997 (aged 24)	(South African Football Association) SuperSport United
5	DF	Luke Fleurs	3 March 2000 (aged 21)	(South African Football Association) SuperSport United
6	MF	Kamohelo Mahlatsi	23 August 1998 (aged 22)	(South African Football Association) Moroka Swallows
7	MF	Nkosingiphile Ngcobo	16 November 1999 (aged 21)	(South African Football Association) Kaizer Chiefs
8	MF	Thabo Cele	15 January 1997 (aged 24)	(Portuguese Football Federation) Cova Piedade
9	FW	Evidence Makgopa	5 June 2000 (aged 21)	(South African Football Association) Baroka
10	FW	Luther Singh	5 August 1997 (aged 23)	(Portuguese Football Federation) Paços de Ferreira
11	DF	MacBeth Mahlangu	11 October 2001 (aged 19)	(South African Football Association) TS Galaxy
12	MF	Goodman Mosele	18 November 1999 (aged 21)	(South African Football Association) Baroka
13	DF	Reeve Frosler	11 January 1998 (aged 23)	(South African Football Association) Kaizer Chiefs
14	DF	Sibusiso Mabiliso	14 April 1999 (aged 22)	(South African Football Association) AmaZulu
15	DF	Tercious Malepe (captain)	18 February 1997 (aged 24)	(Ukrainian Association of Football) Mynai
16	GK	Mondli Mpoto	24 July 1998 (aged 22)	(South African Football Association) Bloemfontein Celtic
17	DF	Thendo Mukumela	30 January 1998 (aged 23)	(South African Football Association) Cape Town Spurs
18	FW	Kobamelo Kodisang	28 August 1999 (aged 21)	(Portuguese Football Federation) Braga
22	GK	Sifiso Mlungwana	27 April 1997 (aged 24)	(South African Football Association) Lamontville Golden Arrows

* Overage player.

== Group B ==
=== Honduras ===
Honduras' final squad was announced on 2 July 2021.

Head coach: (Uruguay) Miguel Falero

No.	Pos.	Player	Date of birth (age)	Club
1	GK	Alex Güity	20 September 1997 (aged 23)	(National Autonomous Federation of Football of Honduras) Olimpia
2	DF	Denil Maldonado (captain)	26 May 1998 (aged 23)	(Football Federation of Chile) Everton
3	DF	Wesly Decas	11 August 1999 (aged 21)	(National Autonomous Federation of Football of Honduras) Motagua
4	DF	Carlos Meléndez	8 December 1997 (aged 23)	(National Autonomous Federation of Football of Honduras) Vida
5	DF	Cristopher Meléndez	25 November 1997 (aged 23)	(National Autonomous Federation of Football of Honduras) Motagua
6	MF	Jonathan Núñez	26 November 2001 (aged 19)	(National Autonomous Federation of Football of Honduras) Motagua
7	MF	José Alejandro Reyes	5 November 1997 (aged 23)	(National Autonomous Federation of Football of Honduras) Real España
8	FW	Edwin Rodríguez	25 September 1999 (aged 21)	(National Autonomous Federation of Football of Honduras) Olimpia
9	FW	Jorge Benguché*	21 May 1996 (aged 25)	(Portuguese Football Federation) Boavista
10	FW	Rigoberto Rivas	31 July 1998 (aged 22)	(Italian Football Federation) Reggina
11	FW	Samuel Elvir	25 April 2001 (aged 20)	(National Autonomous Federation of Football of Honduras) UPNFM
12	GK	Michael Perelló	11 July 1998 (aged 23)	(National Autonomous Federation of Football of Honduras) Real España
13	MF	Brayan Moya*	19 October 1992 (aged 28)	(Angolan Football Federation) 1º de Agosto
14	FW	José Pinto	27 September 1997 (aged 23)	(National Autonomous Federation of Football of Honduras) Olimpia
15	MF	Carlos Pineda	23 September 1997 (aged 23)	(National Autonomous Federation of Football of Honduras) Olimpia
16	DF	José García	21 September 1998 (aged 22)	(National Autonomous Federation of Football of Honduras) Olimpia
17	FW	Luis Palma	17 January 2000 (aged 21)	(National Autonomous Federation of Football of Honduras) Vida
18	FW	Juan Obregón	29 October 1997 (aged 23)	(United States Soccer Federation) Hartford Athletic
19	FW	Douglas Martínez	5 June 1997 (aged 24)	(United States Soccer Federation) Real Salt Lake
20	MF	Jorge Álvarez	28 January 1998 (aged 23)	(National Autonomous Federation of Football of Honduras) Olimpia
21	DF	Elvin Oliva	24 October 1997 (aged 23)	(National Autonomous Federation of Football of Honduras) Olimpia
22	GK	Bryan Ramos	8 August 2001 (aged 19)	(National Autonomous Federation of Football of Honduras) Real España

* Overage player.

=== New Zealand ===
New Zealand's 18-man squad was announced on 25 June 2021. As well as the reserves players named, Tim Payne was named as a replacement in the event that Winston Reid didn't receive a release to travel. On 2 July 2021, Reid was confirmed as available for selection.

Head coach: Danny Hay

No.	Pos.	Player	Date of birth (age)	Caps	Goals	Club
1	GK	Michael Woud	16 January 1999 (aged 22)	2	0	(Royal Dutch Football Association) Almere City
2	DF	Winston Reid* (captain)	3 July 1988 (aged 33)	2	0	(The Football Association) Brentford
3	DF	Liberato Cacace	27 September 2000 (aged 20)	6	0	(Royal Belgian Football Association) Sint-Truiden
4	DF	Nando Pijnaker	25 February 1999 (aged 22)	2	0	(Portuguese Football Federation) Rio Ave
5	DF	Michael Boxall*	18 August 1988 (aged 32)	12	1	(United States Soccer Federation) Minnesota United
6	MF	Clayton Lewis	12 February 1997 (aged 24)	12	4	(New Zealand Football) Wellington Phoenix
7	FW	Elijah Just	1 May 2000 (aged 21)	2	1	(Danish Football Association) Helsingør
8	MF	Joe Bell	27 April 1999 (aged 22)	2	0	(Norwegian Football Federation) Viking
9	FW	Chris Wood*	7 December 1991 (aged 29)	7	2	(The Football Association) Burnley
10	MF	Marko Stamenic	19 February 2002 (aged 19)	1	0	(Danish Football Association) Copenhagen
11	FW	Joe Champness	27 April 1997 (aged 24)	2	0	(Football Australia) Brisbane Roar
12	FW	Callum McCowatt	30 April 1999 (aged 22)	2	0	(Danish Football Association) Helsingør
13	GK	Jamie Searle	25 November 2000 (aged 20)	1	0	(Football Association of Wales) Swansea City
14	DF	George Stanger	15 August 2000 (aged 20)	3	0	(Scottish Football Association) Hamilton Academical
15	DF	Dane Ingham	8 June 1999 (aged 22)	2	0	(Football Australia) Perth Glory
16	DF	Gianni Stensness	7 February 1999 (aged 22)	9	0	(Football Australia) Central Coast Mariners
17	DF	Callan Elliot	7 July 1999 (aged 22)	5	1	(Hellenic Football Federation) Xanthi
18	FW	Ben Waine	11 June 2001 (aged 20)	7	8	(New Zealand Football) Wellington Phoenix
19	FW	Matthew Garbett	13 April 2002 (aged 19)	1	0	(Swedish Football Association) Falkenbergs FF
20	MF	Sam Sutton	10 December 2001 (aged 19)	2	0	(New Zealand Football) Wellington Phoenix
21	MF	Ben Old	13 August 2002 (aged 18)	0	0	(New Zealand Football) Lower Hutt City
22	GK	Alex Paulsen	4 July 2002 (aged 19)	1	0	(New Zealand Football) Lower Hutt City

* Overage player.

=== Romania ===
Romania's initial 22-man squad was announced on 1 July 2021. On 9 July, Dragoș Nedelcu, who was set to complete a loan move to Fortuna Düsseldorf, withdrew from the squad at the request of the club and replaced by Ronaldo Deaconu.

Head coach: Mirel Rădoi

No.	Pos.	Player	Date of birth (age)	Caps	Goals	Club
1	GK	Mihai Popa	12 October 2000 (aged 20)	0	0	(Romanian Football Federation) Astra Giurgiu
2	DF	Radu Boboc	24 April 1999 (aged 22)	2	0	(Romanian Football Federation) Viitorul Constanța
3	DF	Florin Ștefan*	9 May 1996 (aged 25)	2	0	(Romanian Football Federation) Sepsi OSK
4	DF	Alex Pașcanu	28 September 1998 (aged 22)	2	0	(Royal Spanish Football Federation) Ponferradina
5	MF	Tudor Băluță	27 March 1999 (aged 22)	2	0	(Ukrainian Association of Football) Dynamo Kyiv
6	DF	Virgil Ghiță	4 June 1998 (aged 23)	3	0	(Romanian Football Federation) Viitorul Constanța
7	FW	Ion Gheorghe	8 October 1999 (aged 21)	1	0	(Romanian Football Federation) Voluntari
8	MF	Marius Marin (captain)	30 August 1998 (aged 22)	3	0	(Italian Football Federation) Pisa
9	FW	George Ganea	26 May 1999 (aged 22)	3	0	(Romanian Football Federation) Viitorul Constanța
10	MF	Andrei Ciobanu	18 January 1998 (aged 23)	3	0	(Romanian Football Federation) Viitorul Constanța
11	FW	Valentin Gheorghe	14 February 1997 (aged 24)	3	0	(Romanian Football Federation) Astra Giurgiu
12	GK	Mihai Aioani	7 November 1999 (aged 21)	3	0	(Romanian Football Federation) Chindia Târgoviște
13	FW	Eduard Florescu	27 June 1997 (aged 24)	2	0	(Romanian Football Federation) Botoșani
14	DF	Andrei Rațiu	20 June 1998 (aged 23)	2	0	(Royal Dutch Football Association) ADO Den Haag
15	DF	Andrei Chindriș	12 January 1999 (aged 22)	1	0	(Romanian Football Federation) Botoșani
16	MF	Ronaldo Deaconu	20 June 1997 (aged 23)	1	0	(Romanian Football Federation) Gaz Metan
17	DF	Ricardo Grigore	7 April 1999 (aged 22)	3	0	(Romanian Football Federation) Dinamo București
18	MF	Marco Dulca	11 May 1999 (aged 22)	3	0	(Romanian Football Federation) Chindia Târgoviște
19	MF	Andrei Sîntean	16 June 1999 (aged 22)	3	0	(Romanian Football Federation) Hermannstadt
20	FW	Alex Dobre	30 August 1998 (aged 22)	3	0	(French Football Federation) Dijon
21	FW	Antonio Sefer	22 April 2000 (aged 21)	3	0	(Romanian Football Federation) Rapid București
22	GK	Ștefan Târnovanu	9 May 2000 (aged 21)	0	0	(Romanian Football Federation) FCSB

* Overage player.

=== South Korea ===
South Korea's final squad was announced on 2 July 2021.

Head coach: Kim Hak-bum

No.	Pos.	Player	Date of birth (age)	Caps	Goals	Club
1	GK	Song Bum-keun	15 October 1997 (aged 23)	19	0	(Korea Football Association) Jeonbuk Hyundai Motors
2	DF	Lee You-hyeon	8 February 1997 (aged 24)	15	0	(Korea Football Association) Jeonbuk Hyundai Motors
3	DF	Kim Jae-woo	6 February 1998 (aged 23)	10	1	(Korea Football Association) Daegu
4	DF	Park Ji-soo*	13 June 1994 (aged 27)	0	0	(Korea Football Association) Gimcheon Sangmu
5	DF	Jeong Tae-wook	16 May 1997 (aged 24)	19	2	(Korea Football Association) Daegu
6	MF	Jeong Seung-won	27 February 1997 (aged 24)	13	0	(Korea Football Association) Ulsan Hyundai
7	FW	Kwon Chang-hoon*	30 June 1994 (aged 27)	21	11	(German Football Association) SC Freiburg
8	MF	Lee Kang-in	19 February 2001 (aged 20)	3	0	(Royal Spanish Football Federation) Valencia
9	FW	Song Min-kyu	12 September 1999 (aged 21)	5	1	(Korea Football Association) Pohang Steelers
10	MF	Lee Dong-gyeong	20 September 1997 (aged 23)	14	10	(Korea Football Association) Ulsan Hyundai
11	FW	Lee Dong-jun	1 February 1997 (aged 24)	15	7	(Korea Football Association) Ulsan Hyundai
12	DF	Seol Young-woo	5 December 1998 (aged 22)	5	0	(Korea Football Association) Ulsan Hyundai
13	DF	Kim Jin-ya	30 June 1998 (aged 23)	26	1	(Korea Football Association) Seoul
14	MF	Kim Dong-hyun	11 June 1997 (aged 24)	15	0	(Korea Football Association) Gangwon
15	MF	Won Du-jae	18 November 1997 (aged 23)	13	0	(Korea Football Association) Ulsan Hyundai
16	FW	Hwang Ui-jo*	28 August 1992 (aged 28)	24	14	(French Football Federation) Bordeaux
17	FW	Um Won-sang	6 January 1999 (aged 22)	16	1	(Korea Football Association) Gwangju
18	GK	Ahn Joon-soo	28 January 1998 (aged 23)	5	0	(Korea Football Association) Busan IPark
19	DF	Kang Yoon-sung	1 July 1997 (aged 24)	13	0	(Korea Football Association) Jeju United
20	DF	Lee Sang-min (captain)	1 January 1998 (aged 23)	21	1	(Korea Football Association) Seoul E-Land
21	MF	Kim Jin-gyu	24 February 1997 (aged 24)	10	1	(Korea Football Association) Busan IPark
22	GK	An Chan-gi	6 April 1998 (aged 23)	4	0	(Korea Football Association) Suwon Samsung Bluewings

* Overage player.

== Group C ==
=== Argentina ===
Argentina's final squad was announced on 1 July 2021.

Head coach: Fernando Batista

No.	Pos.	Player	Date of birth (age)	Club
1	GK	Jeremías Ledesma*	13 February 1993 (aged 28)	(Royal Spanish Football Federation) Cádiz
2	DF	Nehuén Pérez (captain)	24 June 2000 (aged 21)	(Royal Spanish Football Federation) Granada
3	DF	Claudio Bravo	13 March 1997 (aged 24)	(United States Soccer Federation) Portland Timbers
4	DF	Hernán de la Fuente	7 January 1997 (aged 24)	(Argentine Football Association) Vélez Sarsfield
5	MF	Fausto Vera	26 March 2000 (aged 21)	(Argentine Football Association) Argentinos Juniors
6	DF	Leonel Mosevich	4 February 1997 (aged 24)	(Portuguese Football Federation) Vizela
7	FW	Agustín Urzi	4 May 2000 (aged 21)	(Argentine Football Association) Banfield
8	MF	Santiago Colombatto	17 January 1997 (aged 24)	(Mexican Football Federation) León
9	FW	Adolfo Gaich	26 February 1999 (aged 22)	(Italian Football Federation) Benevento
10	MF	Alexis Mac Allister	24 December 1998 (aged 22)	(The Football Association) Brighton & Hove Albion
11	FW	Ezequiel Barco	29 March 1999 (aged 22)	(United States Soccer Federation) Atlanta United
12	GK	Lautaro Morales	16 December 1999 (aged 21)	(Argentine Football Association) Lanús
13	DF	Marcelo Herrera	3 November 1998 (aged 22)	(Argentine Football Association) San Lorenzo
14	DF	Facundo Medina (2nd captain)	28 May 1999 (aged 22)	(French Football Federation) Lens
15	FW	Pedro de la Vega	7 February 2001 (aged 20)	(Argentine Football Association) Lanús
16	MF	Martín Payero	11 September 1998 (aged 22)	(Argentine Football Association) Banfield
17	MF	Tomás Belmonte	27 May 1998 (aged 23)	(Argentine Football Association) Lanús
18	FW	Ezequiel Ponce	29 March 1997 (aged 24)	(Russian Football Union) Spartak Moscow
19	DF	Francisco Ortega	19 March 1999 (aged 22)	(Argentine Football Association) Vélez Sarsfield
20	MF	Thiago Almada	26 April 2001 (aged 20)	(Argentine Football Association) Vélez Sarsfield
21	FW	Carlos Valenzuela	22 April 1997 (aged 24)	(Portuguese Football Federation) Famalicão
22	GK	Joaquín Blázquez	28 January 2001 (aged 20)	(Argentine Football Association) Talleres

* Overage player.

=== Australia ===
Australia's squad was named on 29 June 2021. On 5 July 2021, it was announced that Marco Tilio replaced Ramy Najjarine and Jay Rich-Baghuelou replaced Ruon Tongyik.

Head coach: Graham Arnold

No.	Pos.	Player	Date of birth (age)	Caps	Goals	Club
1	GK	Tom Glover	24 December 1997 (aged 23)	10	0	(Football Australia) Melbourne City
2	DF	Nathaniel Atkinson	13 June 1999 (aged 22)	5	0	(Football Australia) Melbourne City
3	DF	Kye Rowles	24 June 1998 (aged 23)	3	0	(Football Australia) Central Coast Mariners
4	DF	Jay Rich-Baghuelou	22 October 1999 (aged 21)	5	0	(The Football Association) Crystal Palace
5	DF	Harry Souttar	22 October 1998 (aged 22)	4	0	(The Football Association) Stoke City
6	MF	Keanu Baccus	7 June 1998 (aged 23)	15	0	(Football Australia) Western Sydney Wanderers
7	FW	Reno Piscopo	27 May 1998 (aged 23)	13	2	(New Zealand Football) Wellington Phoenix
8	MF	Riley McGree	2 November 1998 (aged 22)	11	3	(The Football Association) Birmingham City
9	FW	Nicholas D'Agostino	25 February 1998 (aged 23)	9	5	(Football Australia) Perth Glory
10	MF	Denis Genreau	21 May 1999 (aged 22)	8	0	(Football Australia) Macarthur FC
11	FW	Daniel Arzani	4 January 1999 (aged 22)	6	3	(Danish Football Association) AGF
12	FW	Mitchell Duke*	18 January 1991 (aged 30)	2	1	(Football Australia) Western Sydney Wanderers
13	FW	Dylan Pierias	20 February 2000 (aged 21)	1	0	(Football Australia) Western United
14	DF	Thomas Deng (captain)	20 March 1997 (aged 24)	12	1	(Japan Football Association) Urawa Red Diamonds
15	MF	Caleb Watts	16 January 2002 (aged 19)	5	0	(The Football Association) Southampton
16	DF	Joel King	30 October 2000 (aged 20)	1	0	(Football Australia) Sydney FC
17	MF	Connor Metcalfe	5 November 1999 (aged 21)	6	0	(Football Australia) Melbourne City
18	GK	Ashley Maynard-Brewer	25 June 1999 (aged 22)	3	0	(The Football Association) Charlton Athletic
19	FW	Marco Tilio	23 August 2001 (aged 19)	2	0	(Football Australia) Melbourne City
20	FW	Lachlan Wales	19 October 1997 (aged 23)	6	1	(Football Australia) Western United
21	MF	Cameron Devlin	7 June 1998 (aged 23)	2	0	(New Zealand Football) Wellington Phoenix
22	GK	Jordan Holmes	8 May 1997 (aged 24)	5	0	(The Football Association) Ebbsfleet United

* Overage player.

=== Egypt ===
Egypt's 22-man final squad was announced on 2 July 2021.

Head coach: Shawky Gharieb

No.	Pos.	Player	Date of birth (age)	Club
1	GK	Mohamed El Shenawy*	18 December 1988 (aged 32)	(Egyptian Football Association) Al Ahly
2	MF	Amar Hamdy	26 November 1999 (aged 21)	(Egyptian Football Association) Al Ittihad
3	DF	Karim Fouad	1 October 1999 (aged 20)	(Egyptian Football Association) ENPPI
4	DF	Osama Galal	17 September 1997 (aged 23)	(Egyptian Football Association) Pyramids
5	DF	Mohamed Abdel Salam	1 October 1997 (aged 23)	(Egyptian Football Association) Zamalek
6	DF	Ahmed Hegazi* (captain)	25 January 1991 (aged 30)	(Saudi Arabian Football Federation) Al-Ittihad
7	FW	Salah Mohsen	1 September 1998 (aged 22)	(Egyptian Football Association) Al Ahly
8	MF	Nasser Maher	8 February 1997 (aged 24)	(Egyptian Football Association) Al Ahly
9	FW	Taher Mohamed	7 March 1997 (aged 24)	(Egyptian Football Association) Al Ahly
10	FW	Ramadan Sobhi	23 January 1997 (aged 24)	(Egyptian Football Association) Pyramids
11	FW	Ibrahim Adel	23 April 2001 (aged 20)	(Egyptian Football Association) Pyramids
12	MF	Akram Tawfik	8 November 1997 (aged 23)	(Egyptian Football Association) Al Ahly
13	DF	Karim El Eraki	29 November 1997 (aged 22)	(Egyptian Football Association) Al Masry
14	FW	Ahmed Yasser Rayyan	24 January 1998 (aged 23)	(Egyptian Football Association) Ceramica Cleopatra
15	MF	Emam Ashour	20 February 1998 (aged 23)	(Egyptian Football Association) Zamalek
16	GK	Mahmoud Gad	1 October 1998 (aged 22)	(Egyptian Football Association) ENPPI
17	DF	Ahmed Ramadan	23 March 1997 (aged 24)	(Egyptian Football Association) Al Ahly
18	DF	Mahmoud Hamdy*	1 June 1995 (aged 26)	(Egyptian Football Association) Zamalek
19	FW	Abdel Rahman Magdy	12 September 1997 (aged 23)	(Egyptian Football Association) Ismaily
20	DF	Ahmed Fatouh	22 March 1998 (aged 22)	(Egyptian Football Association) Zamalek
21	FW	Nasser Mansi	16 November 1997 (aged 23)	(Egyptian Football Association) Tala'ea El Gaish
22	GK	Mohamed Sobhy	15 July 1999 (aged 22)	(Egyptian Football Association) Al Ittihad

* Overage player.

=== Spain ===
Spain's 60-man preliminary squad was announced on 5 June 2021. The 22-man squad was announced on 29 June 2021, with Iván Villar replacing the injured Álex Domínguez.

Head coach: Luis de la Fuente

No.	Pos.	Player	Date of birth (age)	Caps	Goals	Club
1	GK	Unai Simón	11 June 1997 (aged 24)	1	0	(Royal Spanish Football Federation) Athletic Bilbao
2	DF	Óscar Mingueza	13 May 1999 (aged 22)	1	0	(Royal Spanish Football Federation) Barcelona
3	DF	Marc Cucurella	22 July 1998 (aged 23)	1	0	(Royal Spanish Football Federation) Getafe
4	DF	Pau Torres	16 January 1997 (aged 24)	1	0	(Royal Spanish Football Federation) Villarreal
5	DF	Jesús Vallejo (captain)	5 January 1997 (aged 24)	0	0	(Royal Spanish Football Federation) Granada
6	MF	Martín Zubimendi	2 February 1999 (aged 22)	1	0	(Royal Spanish Football Federation) Real Sociedad
7	FW	Marco Asensio*	21 January 1996 (aged 25)	1	0	(Royal Spanish Football Federation) Real Madrid
8	MF	Mikel Merino*	22 June 1996 (aged 25)	1	0	(Royal Spanish Football Federation) Real Sociedad
9	FW	Rafa Mir	18 June 1997 (aged 24)	1	0	(Royal Spanish Football Federation) Huesca
10	MF	Dani Ceballos*	7 August 1996 (aged 24)	1	0	(The Football Association) Arsenal
11	FW	Mikel Oyarzabal	21 April 1997 (aged 24)	1	0	(Royal Spanish Football Federation) Real Sociedad
12	DF	Eric García	9 January 2001 (aged 20)	1	0	(The Football Association) Manchester City
13	GK	Álvaro Fernández	13 April 1998 (aged 23)	1	0	(Royal Spanish Football Federation) Huesca
14	MF	Carlos Soler	2 January 1997 (aged 24)	1	1	(Royal Spanish Football Federation) Valencia
15	MF	Jon Moncayola	13 May 1998 (aged 23)	1	0	(Royal Spanish Football Federation) Osasuna
16	MF	Pedri	25 November 2002 (aged 18)	1	0	(Royal Spanish Football Federation) Barcelona
17	FW	Javi Puado	25 May 1998 (aged 23)	1	0	(Royal Spanish Football Federation) Espanyol
18	DF	Óscar Gil	26 April 1998 (aged 23)	1	0	(Royal Spanish Football Federation) Espanyol
19	MF	Dani Olmo	7 May 1998 (aged 23)	1	0	(German Football Association) RB Leipzig
20	DF	Juan Miranda	19 January 2000 (aged 21)	1	0	(Royal Spanish Football Federation) Betis
21	FW	Bryan Gil	11 February 2001 (aged 20)	1	0	(Royal Spanish Football Federation) Eibar
22	GK	Iván Villar	9 July 1997 (aged 24)	0	0	(Royal Spanish Football Federation) Celta Vigo

* Overage player.

== Group D ==
=== Brazil ===
Brazil's 50-man preliminary squad was announced on 15 June 2021. The 18-man squad was announced on 17 June. However, after several clubs refused to release their players, a new squad was announced on 2 July 2021, along with four additional players to complete the final roster of 22. On 8 July, Ricardo Graça replaced Gabriel Magalhães who withdrew injured. On 14 July, Malcom replaced Douglas Augusto who withdrew injured.

Head coach: André Jardine

No.	Pos.	Player	Date of birth (age)	Caps	Goals	Club
1	GK	Aderbar Santos*	17 March 1990 (aged 31)	1	0	(Brazilian Football Confederation) Athletico Paranaense
2	MF	Gabriel Menino	29 September 2000 (aged 20)	3	0	(Brazilian Football Confederation) Palmeiras
3	DF	Diego Carlos*	15 March 1993 (aged 28)	1	1	(Royal Spanish Football Federation) Sevilla
4	DF	Ricardo Graça	16 February 1997 (aged 24)	3	0	(Brazilian Football Confederation) Vasco da Gama
5	MF	Douglas Luiz	9 May 1998 (aged 23)	8	2	(The Football Association) Aston Villa
6	DF	Guilherme Arana	14 April 1997 (aged 24)	5	1	(Brazilian Football Confederation) Atlético Mineiro
7	FW	Paulinho	15 July 2000 (aged 21)	19	6	(German Football Association) Bayer Leverkusen
8	MF	Bruno Guimarães	16 November 1997 (aged 23)	12	0	(French Football Federation) Lyon
9	FW	Matheus Cunha	27 May 1999 (aged 22)	19	18	(German Football Association) Hertha BSC
10	FW	Richarlison	10 May 1997 (aged 24)	1	3	(The Football Association) Everton
11	FW	Antony	24 February 2000 (aged 21)	17	6	(Royal Dutch Football Association) Ajax
12	GK	Brenno	1 April 1999 (aged 22)	1	0	(Brazilian Football Confederation) Grêmio
13	DF	Dani Alves* (captain)	6 May 1983 (aged 38)	1	0	(Brazilian Football Confederation) São Paulo
14	DF	Bruno Fuchs	1 April 1999 (aged 22)	8	0	(Russian Football Union) CSKA Moscow
15	DF	Nino	10 April 1997 (aged 24)	8	0	(Brazilian Football Confederation) Fluminense
16	DF	Abner	27 May 2000 (aged 21)	2	0	(Brazilian Football Confederation) Athletico Paranaense
17	FW	Malcom	26 February 1997 (aged 24)	4	0	(Russian Football Union) Zenit Saint Petersburg
18	MF	Matheus Henrique	19 December 1997 (aged 23)	17	1	(Brazilian Football Confederation) Grêmio
19	MF	Reinier	19 January 2002 (aged 19)	11	3	(German Football Association) Borussia Dortmund
20	MF	Claudinho	28 January 1997 (aged 24)	3	0	(Brazilian Football Confederation) Red Bull Bragantino
21	FW	Gabriel Martinelli	18 June 2001 (aged 20)	5	1	(The Football Association) Arsenal
22	GK	Lucão	26 February 2001 (aged 20)	1	0	(Brazilian Football Confederation) Vasco da Gama

* Overage player.

=== Germany ===
Germany's final squad was announced on 4 July 2021. Ragnar Ache and Keven Schlotterbeck were nominated five days later, after Josha Vagnoman and Niklas Dorsch withdrew.

Head coach: Stefan Kuntz

No.	Pos.	Player	Date of birth (age)	Caps	Goals	Club
1	GK	Florian Müller	13 November 1997 (aged 23)	0	0	(German Football Association) SC Freiburg
2	DF	Benjamin Henrichs	23 February 1997 (aged 24)	5	0	(German Football Association) RB Leipzig
3	DF	David Raum	22 April 1998 (aged 23)	0	0	(German Football Association) Greuther Fürth
4	DF	Felix Uduokhai	9 September 1997 (aged 23)	0	0	(German Football Association) FC Augsburg
5	DF	Amos Pieper	17 January 1998 (aged 23)	0	0	(German Football Association) Arminia Bielefeld
6	FW	Ragnar Ache	28 July 1998 (aged 22)	0	0	(German Football Association) Eintracht Frankfurt
7	MF	Marco Richter	24 November 1997 (aged 23)	0	0	(German Football Association) FC Augsburg
8	MF	Maximilian Arnold* (captain)	27 May 1994 (aged 27)	1	0	(German Football Association) VfL Wolfsburg
9	FW	Cedric Teuchert	14 January 1997 (aged 24)	0	0	(German Football Association) Union Berlin
10	FW	Max Kruse*	19 March 1988 (aged 33)	14	4	(German Football Association) Union Berlin
11	MF	Nadiem Amiri*	27 October 1996 (aged 24)	5	0	(German Football Association) Bayer Leverkusen
12	GK	Svend Brodersen	22 March 1997 (aged 24)	0	0	(German Football Association) FC St. Pauli
13	MF	Arne Maier	8 January 1999 (aged 22)	0	0	(German Football Association) Arminia Bielefeld
14	MF	Ismail Jakobs	17 August 1999 (aged 21)	0	0	(German Football Association) 1. FC Köln
15	DF	Jordan Torunarigha	7 August 1997 (aged 23)	0	0	(German Football Association) Hertha BSC
16	DF	Keven Schlotterbeck	28 April 1997 (aged 24)	0	0	(German Football Association) SC Freiburg
17	MF	Anton Stach	15 November 1998 (aged 22)	0	0	(German Football Association) Greuther Fürth
18	MF	Eduard Löwen	28 January 1997 (aged 24)	0	0	(German Football Association) Hertha BSC
22	GK	Luca Plogmann	10 March 2000 (aged 21)	0	0	(German Football Association) SV Meppen

* Overage player.

=== Ivory Coast ===
Ivory Coast's final squad was announced on 3 July 2021.

Head coach: Soualiho Haïdara

No.	Pos.	Player	Date of birth (age)	Club
1	GK	Maxime Nagoli	20 December 2000 (aged 20)	(Ivorian Football Federation) Sol
2	DF	Silas Gnaka	18 December 1998 (aged 22)	(Royal Belgian Football Association) Eupen
3	DF	Eric Bailly*	12 April 1994 (aged 27)	(The Football Association) Manchester United
4	DF	Kouadio-Yves Dabila	1 January 1997 (aged 24)	(Royal Belgian Football Association) Mouscron
5	DF	Ismaël Diallo	29 January 1997 (aged 24)	(French Football Federation) Ajaccio
6	DF	Wilfried Singo	25 December 2000 (aged 20)	(Italian Football Federation) Torino
7	MF	Idrissa Doumbia	14 April 1998 (aged 23)	(Royal Spanish Football Federation) Huesca
8	MF	Franck Kessié*	19 December 1996 (aged 24)	(Italian Football Federation) Milan
9	FW	Youssouf Dao	5 March 1998 (aged 23)	(Football Association of the Czech Republic) Sparta Praha
10	FW	Amad Diallo	11 July 2002 (aged 19)	(The Football Association) Manchester United
11	FW	Christian Kouamé	6 December 1997 (aged 23)	(Italian Football Federation) Fiorentina
12	MF	Eboue Kouassi	13 December 1997 (aged 23)	(Royal Belgian Football Association) Genk
13	FW	Kader Keïta	6 November 2000 (aged 20)	(Royal Belgian Football Association) Westerlo
14	FW	Parfait Guiagon	22 February 2001 (aged 20)	(Israel Football Association) Beitar Tel Aviv
15	FW	Max Gradel* (captain)	30 November 1987 (aged 33)	(Turkish Football Federation) Sivasspor
16	GK	Ira Eliezer Tapé	31 August 1997 (aged 23)	(Ivorian Football Federation) San Pedro
17	DF	Zié Ouattara	9 January 2000 (aged 21)	(Portuguese Football Federation) Vitória Guimarães
18	FW	Cheick Timité	20 November 1997 (aged 23)	(French Football Federation) Amiens
19	DF	Koffi Kouao	20 May 1998 (aged 23)	(Portuguese Football Federation) Vizela
20	FW	Aboubacar Doumbia	12 November 1999 (aged 21)	(Israel Football Association) Maccabi Netanya
22	GK	Nicolas Tié	13 February 2001 (aged 20)	(Portuguese Football Federation) Vitória Guimarães

* Overage player.

=== Saudi Arabia ===
Saudi Arabia's 24-man preliminary squad was announced on 16 June 2021. The final squad was announced on 6 July 2021. Turki Al-Ammar withdrew injured and was replaced by Firas Al-Buraikan on 21 July.

Head coach: Saad Al-Shehri

No.	Pos.	Player	Date of birth (age)	Club
1	GK	Amin Bukhari	2 May 1997 (aged 24)	(Saudi Arabian Football Federation) Al-Ain
2	DF	Saud Abdulhamid	18 July 1999 (aged 22)	(Saudi Arabian Football Federation) Al-Ittihad
3	DF	Hamad Al-Yami	17 May 1999 (aged 22)	(Saudi Arabian Football Federation) Al-Qadsiah
4	DF	Abdulbasit Hindi	2 February 1997 (aged 24)	(Saudi Arabian Football Federation) Al-Ahli
5	DF	Abdulelah Al-Amri	15 January 1997 (aged 24)	(Saudi Arabian Football Federation) Al-Nassr
6	MF	Sami Al-Najei	7 February 1997 (aged 24)	(Saudi Arabian Football Federation) Al-Nassr
7	MF	Salman Al-Faraj* (captain)	1 August 1989 (aged 31)	(Saudi Arabian Football Federation) Al-Hilal
8	MF	Nasser Al-Omran	13 July 1997 (aged 24)	(Saudi Arabian Football Federation) Al-Shabab
9	FW	Abdullah Al-Hamdan	13 September 1999 (aged 21)	(Saudi Arabian Football Federation) Al-Hilal
10	MF	Salem Al-Dawsari*	19 August 1991 (aged 29)	(Saudi Arabian Football Federation) Al-Hilal
11	MF	Khalid Al-Ghannam	7 November 2000 (aged 20)	(Saudi Arabian Football Federation) Al-Nassr
12	GK	Mohammed Al Rubaie	14 August 1997 (aged 23)	(Saudi Arabian Football Federation) Al-Ahli
13	DF	Yasser Al-Shahrani*	25 May 1992 (aged 29)	(Saudi Arabian Football Federation) Al-Hilal
14	MF	Ali Al-Hassan	4 March 1997 (aged 24)	(Saudi Arabian Football Federation) Al-Nassr
15	MF	Ayman Yahya	14 May 2001 (aged 20)	(Saudi Arabian Football Federation) Al-Nassr
16	DF	Khalifah Al-Dawsari	2 January 1999 (aged 22)	(Saudi Arabian Football Federation) Al-Qadsiah
17	MF	Ayman Al-Khulaif	22 May 1997 (aged 24)	(Saudi Arabian Football Federation) Al-Wehda
18	MF	Abdulrahman Ghareeb	31 March 1997 (aged 24)	(Saudi Arabian Football Federation) Al-Ahli
19	FW	Firas Al-Buraikan	14 May 2000 (aged 21)	(Saudi Arabian Football Federation) Al-Nassr
20	MF	Mukhtar Ali	30 October 1997 (aged 23)	(Saudi Arabian Football Federation) Al-Nassr
21	DF	Abdullah Hassoun	19 March 1997 (aged 24)	(Saudi Arabian Football Federation) Al-Ahli
22	GK	Zaid Al-Bawardi	26 January 1997 (aged 24)	(Saudi Arabian Football Federation) Al-Shabab

* Overage player.
