= Football at the 2020 Summer Olympics – Men's tournament – Group A =

Football at the Olympics

Group A of the men's football tournament at the 2020 Summer Olympics was played from 22 to 28 July 2021 in Chōfu's Tokyo Stadium, Saitama's Saitama Stadium, Sapporo's Sapporo Dome and Yokohama's International Stadium Yokohama. The group consisted of France, host nation Japan, Mexico and South Africa. The top two teams, Japan and Mexico, advanced to the knockout stage.

== Teams ==
Draw position	Team	Pot	Confederation	Method of qualification	Date of qualification	Olympic appearance	Last appearance	Previous best performance
A1	Japan	1	AFC	Hosts	7 September 2013	11th	2016	Bronze medalists (1968)
A2	South Africa	3	CAF	2019 Africa U-23 Cup of Nations third place	22 November 2019	3rd	2016	11th place (2000)
A3	Mexico	2	CONCACAF	2020 CONCACAF Men's Olympic Qualifying Championship champions	30 March 2021	12th	2016	Gold medalists (2012)
A4	France	4	UEFA	2019 UEFA European Under-21 Championship semi-finalists	27 June 2019	13th	1996	Gold medalists (1984)

== Standings ==
Pos	Team	Pld	W	D	L	GF	GA	GD	Pts	Qualification
1	Japan (H)	3	3	0	0	7	1	+6	9	Advance to knockout stage
2	Mexico	3	2	0	1	8	3	+5	6	Advance to knockout stage
3	France	3	1	0	2	5	11	−6	3	
4	South Africa	3	0	0	3	3	8	−5	0	

Source: TOCOG and FIFA
Rules for classification: Group stage tiebreakers
(H) Hosts

In the quarter-finals,

- The winners of Group A, Japan, advanced to play the runners-up of Group B, New Zealand.
- The runners-up of Group A, Mexico, advanced to play the winners of Group B, South Korea.

== Matches ==
=== Mexico vs France ===
22 July 2021
17:00

Mexico	4–1	France
Vega 47'; Córdova 55'; Antuna 80'; Aguirre 90+1'	Report (TOCOG); Report (FIFA)	Gignac 69' (pen.)

Tokyo Stadium, Chōfu
Referee: Chris Beath (Australia)

Mexico	France

GK	13	Guillermo Ochoa (c)
RB	2	Jorge Sánchez
CB	3	César Montes
CB	5	Johan Vásquez
LB	14	Érick Aguirre
CM	7	Luis Romo
CM	8	Charly Rodríguez
RW	10	Diego Lainez		(substituted off) 72'
AM	17	Sebastián Córdova		(substituted off) 72'
LW	11	Alexis Vega	(yellow card) 20'	(substituted off) 84'
CF	9	Henry Martín		(substituted off) 88'
Substitutions:
FW	15	Uriel Antuna		(substituted on) 72'
MF	16	José Joaquín Esquivel		(substituted on) 72'
FW	21	Roberto Alvarado		(substituted on) 84'
FW	18	Eduardo Aguirre		(substituted on) 88'
Head coach:
Jaime Lozano

GK	1	Paul Bernardoni
RB	13	Clément Michelin	(yellow card) 16'
CB	2	Pierre Kalulu
CB	15	Modibo Sagnan
LB	17	Anthony Caci	(yellow card) 75'	(substituted off) 90'
CM	6	Lucas Tousart		(substituted off) 60'
CM	8	Enzo Le Fée
RW	14	Florian Thauvin		(substituted off) 79'
AM	11	Téji Savanier
LW	7	Arnaud Nordin		(substituted off) 60'
CF	10	André-Pierre Gignac (c)
Substitutions:
MF	12	Alexis Beka Beka		(substituted on) 60'
FW	18	Randal Kolo Muani		(substituted on) 60'
FW	9	Nathanaël Mbuku		(substituted on) 79'
DF	3	Melvin Bard		(substituted on) 90'
Head coach:
Sylvain Ripoll

Assistant referees:
Anton Schetinin (Australia)
George Lakrindis (Australia)
Fourth official:
Bamlak Tessema Weyesa (Ethiopia)
Video assistant referee:
Fu Ming (China PR)
Assistant video assistant referee:
Abdulkadir Bitigen (Turkey)

=== Japan vs South Africa ===
22 July 2021
20:00

Japan	1–0	South Africa
Kubo 71'	Report (TOCOG); Report (FIFA)

Tokyo Stadium, Chōfu
Referee: Jesús Valenzuela (Venezuela)

Japan	South Africa

GK	12	Kosei Tani
CB	4	Ko Itakura
CB	5	Maya Yoshida (c)
CB	3	Yuta Nakayama		(substituted off) 72'
RM	8	Koji Miyoshi		(substituted off) 60'
CM	6	Wataru Endo	(yellow card) 37'
CM	17	Ao Tanaka
LM	2	Hiroki Sakai
RF	10	Ritsu Dōan	(yellow card) 57'	(substituted off) 85'
CF	19	Daichi Hayashi		(substituted off) 72'
LF	7	Takefusa Kubo
Substitutions:
FW	16	Yuki Soma		(substituted on) 60'
MF	13	Reo Hatate		(substituted on) 72'
FW	18	Ayase Ueda		(substituted on) 72'
DF	20	Koki Machida		(substituted on) 85'
Head coach:
Hajime Moriyasu

GK	1	Ronwen Williams
RB	4	Teboho Mokoena
CB	5	Luke Fleurs
CB	17	Thendo Mukumela	(substituted off) 79'
LB	15	Tercious Malepe (c)
RM	13	Reeve Frosler
CM	12	Goodman Mosele	(substituted off) 90+1'
CM	8	Thabo Cele
LM	14	Sibusiso Mabiliso
SS	10	Luther Singh
CF	9	Evidence Makgopa
Substitutions:
FW	18	Kobamelo Kodisang	(substituted on) 79'
MF	7	Nkosingiphile Ngcobo	(substituted on) 90+1'
Head coach:
David Notoane

Assistant referees:
Tulio Moreno (Venezuela)
Lubin Torrealba (Venezuela)
Fourth official:
Kevin Ortega (Peru)
Video assistant referee:
Mauro Vigliano (Argentina)
Assistant video assistant referee:
Edvin Jurisevic (United States)

=== France vs South Africa ===
25 July 2021
17:00

France	4–3	South Africa
Gignac 57', 78', 86' (pen.); Savanier 90+2'	Report (TOCOG); Report (FIFA)	Kodisang 53'; Makgopa 73'; Mokoena 82'

Saitama Stadium 2002, Saitama
Referee: Kevin Ortega (Peru)

France	South Africa

GK	1	Paul Bernardoni
CB	13	Clément Michelin
CB	2	Pierre Kalulu
CB	5	Niels Nkounkou	(yellow card) 20'
RM	14	Florian Thauvin		(substituted off) 69'
CM	6	Lucas Tousart		(substituted off) 69'
LM	17	Anthony Caci
RW	18	Randal Kolo Muani
AM	11	Téji Savanier	(yellow card) 68'
LW	9	Nathanaël Mbuku		(substituted off) 61'
CF	10	André-Pierre Gignac (c)
Substitutions:
MF	8	Enzo Le Fée		(substituted on) 61'
FW	7	Arnaud Nordin		(substituted on) 69'
MF	12	Alexis Beka Beka		(substituted on) 69'
Head coach:
Sylvain Ripoll

GK	1	Ronwen Williams	(yellow card) 85'
RB	13	Reeve Frosler		(substituted off) 83'
CB	5	Luke Fleurs
CB	3	Katlego Mohamme
LB	15	Tercious Malepe (c)
CM	4	Teboho Mokoena	(yellow card) 16'	(substituted off) 83'
CM	8	Thabo Cele
RW	18	Kobamelo Kodisang		(substituted off) 78'
AM	7	Nkosingiphile Ngcobo		(substituted off) 65'
LW	10	Luther Singh
CF	9	Evidence Makgopa
Substitutions:
MF	6	Kamohelo Mahlatsi		(substituted on) 65'
MF	12	Goodman Mosele		(substituted on) 78'
DF	17	Thendo Mukumela		(substituted on) 83'
DF	2	James Monyane		(substituted on) 83'
Head coach:
David Notoane

Assistant referees:
Michael Orué (Peru)
Jesús Sánchez (Peru)
Fourth official:
Leodán González (Uruguay)
Video assistant referee:
Andrés Cunha (Uruguay)
Assistant video assistant referee:
Marco Guida (Italy)

=== Japan vs Mexico ===
25 July 2021
20:00

Japan	2–1	Mexico
Kubo 6'; Dōan 11' (pen.)	Report (TOCOG); Report (FIFA)	Alvarado 85'

Saitama Stadium 2002, Saitama
Referee: Artur Soares Dias (Portugal)

Japan	Mexico

GK	12	Kosei Tani
RB	2	Hiroki Sakai	(yellow card) 47'
CB	4	Ko Itakura
CB	5	Maya Yoshida (c)
LB	3	Yuta Nakayama
DM	6	Wataru Endo
RM	10	Ritsu Dōan		(substituted off) 80'
CM	17	Ao Tanaka	(yellow card) 48'
LM	16	Yuki Soma		(substituted off) 66'
SS	7	Takefusa Kubo
CF	19	Daichi Hayashi		(substituted off) 80'
Substitutions:
FW	9	Daizen Maeda		(substituted on) 66'
FW	11	Kaoru Mitoma		(substituted on) 80'
FW	18	Ayase Ueda		(substituted on) 80'
Head coach:
Hajime Moriyasu

GK	13	Guillermo Ochoa (c)
RB	2	Jorge Sánchez	(yellow card) 29'
CB	3	César Montes	(yellow card) 11'
CB	5	Johan Vásquez	(red card) 68'
LB	14	Érick Aguirre		(substituted off) 43'
CM	7	Luis Romo
CM	8	Charly Rodríguez	(yellow card) 25'	(substituted off) 57'
RW	10	Diego Lainez		(substituted off) 67'
AM	17	Sebastián Córdova
LW	11	Alexis Vega		(substituted off) 67'
CF	9	Henry Martín
Substitutions:
DF	6	Vladimir Loroña		(substituted on) 43'
MF	16	José Joaquín Esquivel		(substituted on) 57'
FW	15	Uriel Antuna		(substituted on) 67'
FW	21	Roberto Alvarado		(substituted on) 67'
Head coach:
Jaime Lozano

Assistant referees:
Rui Tavares (Portugal)
Paulo Santos (Portugal)
Fourth official:
Dahane Beida (Mauritania)
Video assistant referee:
Guillermo Cuadra Fernández (Spain)
Assistant video assistant referee:
Adil Zourak (Morocco)

=== France vs Japan ===
28 July 2021
20:30

France	0–4	Japan
	Report (TOCOG); Report (FIFA)	Kubo 27'; Sakai 34'; Miyoshi 70'; Maeda 90+1'

International Stadium Yokohama, Yokohama
Referee: Iván Barton (El Salvador)

France	Japan

GK	1	Paul Bernardoni
RB	13	Clément Michelin	(yellow card) 66'
CB	2	Pierre Kalulu		(substituted off) 62'
CB	12	Alexis Beka Beka
LB	4	Timothée Pembélé	(yellow card) 58'	(substituted off) 62'
CM	14	Florian Thauvin
CM	6	Lucas Tousart
CM	17	Anthony Caci
AM	11	Téji Savanier		(substituted off) 38'
CF	18	Randal Kolo Muani	(red card) 74'
CF	10	André-Pierre Gignac (c)
Substitutions:
MF	8	Enzo Le Fée		(substituted on) 38'
DF	15	Modibo Sagnan		(substituted on) 62'
DF	3	Melvin Bard		(substituted on) 62'
Head coach:
Sylvain Ripoll

GK	12	Kosei Tani
RB	2	Hiroki Sakai	(yellow card) 44'	(substituted off) 55'
CB	14	Takehiro Tomiyasu	(yellow card) 22'
CB	5	Maya Yoshida (c)
LB	3	Yuta Nakayama
DM	6	Wataru Endo		(substituted off) 72'
CM	17	Ao Tanaka		(substituted off) 80'
CM	13	Reo Hatate
RW	10	Ritsu Dōan		(substituted off) 72'
LW	7	Takefusa Kubo		(substituted off) 46'
CF	18	Ayase Ueda
Substitutions:
MF	8	Koji Miyoshi		(substituted on) 46'
DF	15	Daiki Hashioka		(substituted on) 55'
FW	16	Yuki Soma		(substituted on) 72'
DF	4	Ko Itakura		(substituted on) 72'
FW	9	Daizen Maeda		(substituted on) 80'
Head coach:
Hajime Moriyasu

Assistant referees:
David Moran (El Salvador)
Zachari Zeegelaar (Suriname)
Fourth official:
Dahane Beida (Mauritania)
Video assistant referee:
Nicolás Gallo (Colombia)
Assistant video assistant referee:
Bibiana Steinhaus (Germany)

=== South Africa vs Mexico ===
28 July 2021
20:30

South Africa	0–3	Mexico
	Report (TOCOG); Report (FIFA)	Vega 18'; Romo 45+1'; Martín 60'

Sapporo Dome, Sapporo
Referee: Matthew Conger (New Zealand)

South Africa	Mexico

GK	1	Ronwen Williams
RB	4	Teboho Mokoena
CB	5	Luke Fleurs
CB	17	Thendo Mukumela		(substituted off) 67'
LB	15	Tercious Malepe (c)	(red card) 57'
CM	3	Katlego Mohamme	(yellow card) 4'
CM	8	Thabo Cele	(yellow card) 75'	(substituted off) 83'
RW	18	Kobamelo Kodisang		(substituted off) 61'
AM	6	Kamohelo Mahlatsi
LW	10	Luther Singh
CF	9	Evidence Makgopa		(substituted off) 83'
Substitutions:
DF	13	Reeve Frosler		(substituted on) 61'
DF	11	MacBeth Mahlangu		(substituted on) 67'
MF	7	Nkosingiphile Ngcobo		(substituted on) 83'
MF	12	Goodman Mosele		(substituted on) 83'
Head coach:
David Notoane

GK	13	Guillermo Ochoa (c)
CB	2	Jorge Sánchez		(substituted off) 71'
CB	3	César Montes
CB	4	Jesús Alberto Angulo
RM	6	Vladimir Loroña
CM	7	Luis Romo
CM	8	Charly Rodríguez	(red card) 66'
LM	11	Alexis Vega		(substituted off) 77'
RF	15	Uriel Antuna		(substituted off) 77'
CF	9	Henry Martín		(substituted off) 75'
LF	17	Sebastián Córdova		(substituted off) 71'
Substitutions:
DF	12	Adrián Mora		(substituted on) 71'
MF	16	José Joaquín Esquivel		(substituted on) 71'
FW	18	Eduardo Aguirre		(substituted on) 75'
MF	19	Jesús Ricardo Angulo		(substituted on) 77'
FW	10	Diego Lainez		(substituted on) 77'
Head coach:
Jaime Lozano

Assistant referees:
Mark Rule (New Zealand)
Tevita Makasini (Tahiti)
Fourth official:
Orel Grinfeld (Israel)
Video assistant referee:
Marco Guida (Italy)
Assistant video assistant referee:
Muhammad Taqi (Singapore)

== Discipline ==
Fair play points would have been used as a tiebreaker if the overall and head-to-head records of teams were tied. These were calculated based on yellow and red cards received in all group matches as follows:

- first yellow card: minus 1 point;
- indirect red card (second yellow card): minus 3 points;
- direct red card: minus 4 points;
- yellow card and direct red card: minus 5 points;

Only one of the above deductions is applied to a player in a single match.

Team	Match 1				Match 2				Match 3				Points
Team	Booked	(yellow card) (yellow-red card)	Sent off (straight red)	(yellow card) (red card)	Booked	(yellow card) (yellow-red card)	Sent off (straight red)	(yellow card) (red card)	Booked	(yellow card) (yellow-red card)	Sent off (straight red)	(yellow card) (red card)	Points
Japan	2				2				2				–6
South Africa					2				2		1		–8
France	2				2				2		1		–10
Mexico	1				3		1				1		–12
