= Hannah Calvert =

South African water polo player

Personal information
- Nationality: South Africa
- Born: 27 November 1997 (age 27); Cape Town
- Height: 1.75 m (5 ft 9 in)

Sport
- Sport: Water polo
- Club: Warriors Water Polo Club, Cape Town

Hannah Calvert is a South African water polo player. She competed in the 2020 Summer Olympics.
