= Liam Neill =

South African water polo player (born 1997)

Personal information
- Nationality: South Africa
- Born: 26 October 1997 (age 27)

Sport
- Sport: Water polo

Liam Neill (born 26 October 1997) is a South African water polo player. He competed in the 2020 Summer Olympics.
