= Jordan Wedderburn =

South African water polo player

Personal information
- Born: 30 November 2002 (age 22)

Sport
- Sport: Water polo

Jordan Wedderburn (born 30 December 2002) is a South African water polo player.

She was a member of the South Africa women's national water polo team at the 2020 Tokyo Summer Olympics, where they ranked 10th.

== Career statistics ==
Event	Country	Rank	Date	Points
FINA World Women's Junior Waterpolo Championships 2019	POR	12	14 SEP 2019	13 - 12
