= Mondli Mpoto =

South African footballer

Personal information
- Date of birth: 24 July 1998 (age 28)
- Height: 1.81 m (5 ft 11 in)
- Position: Goalkeeper

Team information
- Current team: Royal AM
- Number: 25

Youth career
- –2017: SuperSport United

Senior career*
Years	Team	Apps	(Gls)
2017–2019	SuperSport United	0	(0)
2019–2021	Royal AM	5	(0)
2021–	Royal AM	13	(0)

International career^{‡}
2015	South Africa U17	6	(0)
2017	South Africa U20	7	(0)
2019–	South Africa U23	5	(0)
2019–	South Africa	2	(0)
- * Club domestic league appearances and goals as of 15 June 2024 ‡ National team caps and goals as of 14 July 2021

Mondli Mpoto (born 24 July 1998) is a South African soccer player currently playing as a goalkeeper for Royal AM.

== Career statistics ==
=== Club ===
As of 14 July 2021.

Club	Season	League			National Cup		League Cup		Continental		Other		Total	
Club	Season	Division	Apps	Goals	Apps	Goals	Apps	Goals	Apps	Goals	Apps	Goals	Apps	Goals
SuperSport United	2017–18	Absa Premiership	0	0	0	0	0	0	–		0	0	0	0
SuperSport United	2018–19	Absa Premiership	0	0	0	0	0	0	–		0	0	0	0
SuperSport United	Total		0	0	0	0	0	0	0	0	0	0	0	0
Bloemfontein Celtic	2019–20	Absa Premiership	3	0	0	0	0	0	–		0	0	3	0
Bloemfontein Celtic	2020–21	Absa Premiership	2	0	1 (Note: Appearances in the Nedbank Cup)	0	0	0	2 (Note: Appearances in the CAF Confederation Cup)	0	0	0	5	0
Bloemfontein Celtic	2021–22	Absa Premiership	0	0	0	0	0	0	–		0	0	0	0
Bloemfontein Celtic	Total		5	0	1	0	0	0	2	0	0	0	8	0
Career total			5	0	1	0	0	0	2	0	0	0	8	0

=== International ===
As of matches played 14 July 2021.

Appearances and goals by national team and year
National team	Year	Apps	Goals
South Africa	2019	2	0
Total		2	0
