= Sylvain Ripoll =

French football player and manager (born 1971)

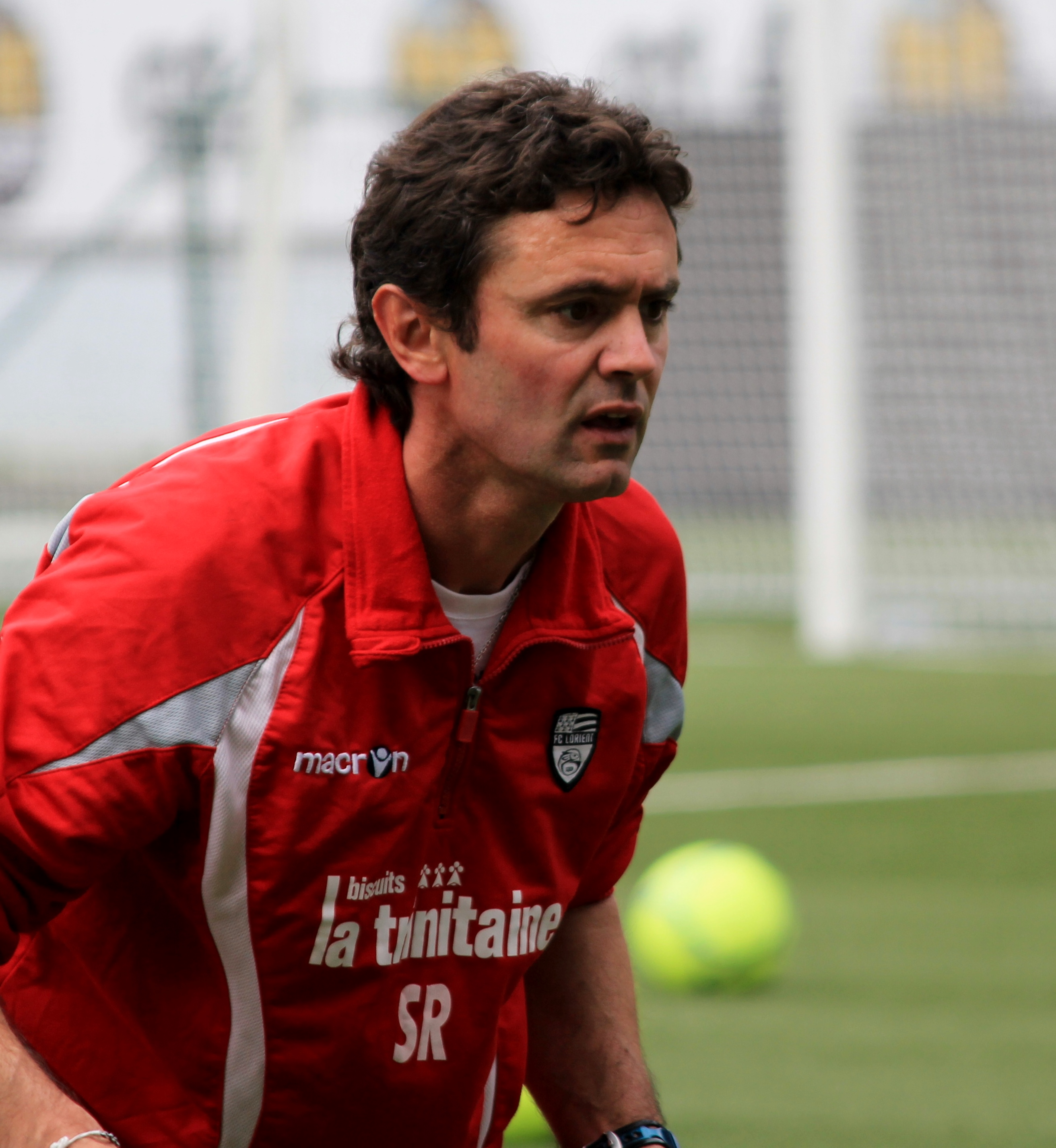
- Ripoll in 2013

Personal information
- Full name: Sylvain Ripoll
- Date of birth: 15 August 1971 (age 55)
- Place of birth: Rennes, France
- Height: 1.76 m (5 ft 9 in)
- Position: Midfielder

Team information
- Current team: Guingamp (manager)

Youth career
- 1978–1986: CPB Ginguené
- 1986–1990: Rennes

Senior career*
| Years | Team | Apps | (Gls) |
| 1990–1994 | Rennes | 77 | (0) |
| 1994–1995 | → Le Mans (loan) | 33 | (1) |
| 1995–2003 | Lorient | 207 | (4) |
| Total | | 317 | (5) |

Managerial career
- 2014–2016: Lorient
- 2017–2023: France U21
- 2021: France Olympic
- 2024–: Guingamp
- * Club domestic league appearances and goals

Sylvain Ripoll (born 15 August 1971) is a French football manager and former player who manages Ligue 2 side Guingamp.

== Career ==
As a player, Ripoll played with Rennes, Le Mans and Lorient.

On 25 May 2014, he was appointed as the new manager of Lorient. He won his first game as a manager in the first Ligue 1 game of the season. Lorient managed to beat Monaco with 2–1 in their own Stade Louis II.
