= Sifiso Mlungwana =

South African footballer

Personal information
- Date of birth: 27 April 1997 (age 29)
- Place of birth: Manguzi, KwaZulu-Natal, South Africa
- Position: Goalkeeper

Team information
- Current team: Lamontville Golden Arrows
- Number: 36

Youth career
- –2019: Lamontville Golden Arrows

Senior career*
Years	Team	Apps	(Gls)
2019–	Lamontville Golden Arrows	78	(0)

International career^{‡}
2021–	South Africa U23	1	(0)
- * Club domestic league appearances and goals as of 1 August 2024 ‡ National team caps and goals as of 18:04, 14 July 2021 (UTC)

Sifiso Mlungwana (born 27 April 1997) is a South African soccer player currently playing as a goalkeeper for Lamontville Golden Arrows.

== Career statistics ==
=== Club ===
As of 14 July 2021.

Club	Season	League			National Cup		League Cup		Continental		Other		Total	
Club	Season	Division	Apps	Goals	Apps	Goals	Apps	Goals	Apps	Goals	Apps	Goals	Apps	Goals
Lamontville Golden Arrows	2019–20	Absa Premiership	13	0	1 (Note: Appearances in the Nedbank Cup)	0	0	0	–		0	0	14	0
Lamontville Golden Arrows	2020–21	Absa Premiership	30	0	1	0	0	0	–		0	0	31	0
Lamontville Golden Arrows	2021–22	Absa Premiership	0	0	0	0	0	0	–		0	0	0	0
Career total			43	0	2	0	0	0	0	0	0	0	45	0
