= Kamohelo Mahlatsi =

South African soccer player

Personal information
- Full name: Kamohelo Abel Mahlatsi
- Date of birth: 23 August 1998 (age 28)
- Place of birth: Sebokeng, South Africa
- Height: 1.74 m (5 ft 9 in)
- Positions: Attacking midfielder; centre forward

Team information
- Current team: Marumo Gallants
- Number: 6

Youth career
- –2018: SuperSport United

Senior career*
Years	Team	Apps	(Gls)
2018–2020	SuperSport United	9	(0)
2018	→ Ubuntu Cape Town (loan)	11	(2)
2019–2020	→ University of Pretoria (loan)	27	(10)
2020–2022	Moroka Swallows	12	(1)
2022–2024	Kaizer Chiefs	5	(0)
2024	Chippa United	9	(0)
2024–	Marumo Gallants	3	(0)

International career^{‡}
2019–	South Africa U23	5	(2)
2019	South Africa	5	(0)
- * Club domestic league appearances and goals as of 3 October 2024 ‡ National team caps and goals as of 11 November 2022

Kamohelo Abel Mahlatsi (born 23 August 1998) is a South African professional soccer player who plays as an attacking midfielder or centre forward for Marumo Gallants. He has also represented South Africa at under-23 and senior international levels.

== Club career ==
Born in Sebokeng, Mahlatsi started his career at SuperSport United before joining Ubuntu Cape Town on loan until the end of the season in January 2018. He scored twice in 11 appearances for Ubuntu Cape Town, and was promoted to the senior SuperSport United squad ahead of the 2018–19 season. He played 9 times for the club across the 2018–19 season. In September 2019, he joined University of Pretoria of the National First Division on a season-long loan. He scored 10 goals in 27 league appearances for University of Pretoria.

On 6 October 2020, Mahlatsi signed for newly-promoted South African Premier Division side Moroka Swallows.

== International career ==
Mahlatsi has represented South Africa at the 2019 COSAFA Cup and South Africa under-23s at the 2019 Africa U-23 Cup of Nations.

== Style of play ==
Mahlatsi is left-footed and plays primarily as an attacking midfielder and a centre forward. In April 2018, he was described by The Sowetan as 'versatile', adding that "his close control with the ball, speed, dribbling, crossing, and ability to use both feet allow him to play in any offensive position on the field".
