= Thabiso Monyane =

South African footballer

Personal information
- Full name: Thabiso James Monyane
- Date of birth: 30 April 2000 (age 26)
- Height: 1.73 m (5 ft 8 in)
- Position: Right-back

Team information
- Current team: Kaizer Chiefs
- Number: 2

Youth career
- 2010–2019: Orlando Pirates

Senior career*
Years	Team	Apps	(Gls)
2019–2025	Orlando Pirates	68	(5)
2025–	Kaizer Chiefs	8	(0)

International career^{‡}
- South Africa U17
2019	South Africa U20	6	(1)
2019	South Africa U23	4	(0)
- * Club domestic league appearances and goals as of 4 January 2026 ‡ National team caps and goals as of 18:04, 21 July 2020 (UTC)

James Thabiso Monyane (born 30 April 2000) is a South African professional soccer player currently playing as a right-back for Kaizer Chiefs and the South Africa national team.

At the youth international level he played in the 2016 COSAFA Under-17 Championship and the 2019 FIFA U-20 World Cup.

== Career statistics ==
=== Club ===
As of 21 July 2020.

Club	Season	League			National Cup		League Cup		Continental		Other		Total	
Club	Season	Division	Apps	Goals	Apps	Goals	Apps	Goals	Apps	Goals	Apps	Goals	Apps	Goals
Orlando Pirates	2019–20	Absa Premiership	11	0	0	0	1 (Note: Appearances in the Telkom Knockout)	0	–		1 (Note: Appearances in the MTN 8)	0	13	0
Career total			11	0	0	0	1	0	0	0	1	0	13	0
