= David Notoane =

South African soccer coach

Personal information
- Full name: David Notoane
- Date of birth: 7 February 1969 (age 57)
- Place of birth: Pretoria, South Africa

Managerial career
- Years: Team
- 2013–2014: Santos Cape Town
- 2014: Cape Town All Stars
- 2014–2015: South Africa U-20
- 2017: Mamelodi Sundowns (assistant)
- 2019–2021: South Africa U-23
- 2021: South Africa (assistant)
- 2022-2023: South Africa U-23

David Notoane (born 7 February 1969) is a South African soccer coach. He coached Santos Cape Town and the Cape Town All Stars, as well as the South African national U-20 and U-23 teams. He also served as assistant coach of the Mamelodi Sundowns and the South African senior national team.

Notoane was the South African U-23 team's coach at the 2020 Summer Olympics, where they lost all three of their group matches. This put his future in jeopardy and he was replaced by Helman Mkhalele some months later.
