= Tercious Malepe =

South African footballer

Personal information
- Full name: Repo Tercious Malepe
- Date of birth: 18 February 1997 (age 29)
- Place of birth: Middelburg, South Africa
- Height: 1.83 m (6 ft 0 in)
- Position: Defender

Team information
- Current team: Balzan
- Number: 24

Youth career
- Orlando Pirates

Senior career*
Years	Team	Apps	(Gls)
2015–2020	Orlando Pirates	0	(0)
2015–2016	→ Moroka Swallows (loan)	22	(0)
2017–2018	→ Ajax Cape Town (loan)	18	(1)
2018–2019	→ Chippa United (loan)	20	(1)
2019–2020	→ Chippa United (loan)	25	(0)
2020–2021	Mynai	14	(0)
2021–2024	AmaZulu	44	(0)
2024	Richards Bay	10	(0)
2024–	Balzan	3	(0)

International career^{‡}
2016–	South Africa	11	(1)
2016–	South Africa Olympic	1	(0)
2017–	South Africa U20	7	(1)
2019–2021	South Africa U23	9	(0)
- * Club domestic league appearances and goals as of 26 June 2025 ‡ National team caps and goals as of 8 August 2021

Repo Tercious Malepe (born 18 February 1997) is a South African professional soccer player who plays as a defender for Maltese Premier League club Balzan and the South Africa national team.

== International career ==
He represented the South Africa under-23 team at the 2020 Summer Olympics. He also represented South Africa in the football competition at the 2016 Summer Olympics, he holds the record of being the first ever male South African footballer to participate in two consecutive Olympic Games.

== Career statistics ==
=== International goals ===
Scores and results list South Africa's goal tally first.

No.	Date	Venue	Opponent	Score	Result	Competition
1.	28 July 2019	Setsoto Stadium, Maseru, Lesotho	Lesotho	1–1	2–3	2020 African Nations Championship qualification
