= Reeve Frosler =

South African soccer player

Personal information
- Full name: Reeve Peter Frosler
- Date of birth: 11 January 1998 (age 28)
- Place of birth: Port Elizabeth, South Africa
- Height: 1.73 m (5 ft 8 in)
- Position: Right back

Team information
- Current team: Kaizer Chiefs
- Number: 39

Youth career
- 2015–2017: Bidvest Wits

Senior career*
Years	Team	Apps	(Gls)
2017–2019	Bidvest Wits	27	(1)
2019–	Kaizer Chiefs	139	(2)

International career^{‡}
2015	South Africa U-17		
2017	South Africa U-20	2	(0)
2018–	South Africa	4	(0)
- * Club domestic league appearances and goals as of 4 January 2026 ‡ National team caps and goals as of 17 May 2017

Reeve Peter Frosler (born 11 January 1998) is a South African professional soccer player who plays as a right back for Kaizer Chiefs in the South African Premier Division.

== Club career ==
=== Bidvest Wits ===
Frosler started his career as a winger in the Bidvest Wits academy before being converted to the full-back position by coach Gavin Hunt. He made 11 appearances in his debut season during which he helped the club win its first ever PSL title. Ahead of the 2018–19 campaign, Frosler reportedly refused a new contract with Wits which resulted in him being frozen out at the club. By the half-way mark of the season, he had not played a single minute of football and signed a pre-contract with the club's rivals, Kaizer Chiefs.

=== Kaizer Chiefs ===
Although initially meant to join the club in June, Frosler joined Kaizer Chiefs on the transfer deadline in January 2019 after an agreement was reached with Wits.
