= Goodman Mosele =

South African soccer player

Personal information
- Date of birth: 18 November 1999 (age 26)
- Place of birth: Khuma, South Africa
- Height: 1.76 m (5 ft 9 in)
- Position: Midfielder

Team information
- Current team: Chippa United (loan)
- Number: 20

Youth career
- –2016: Stillfontein Real Hearts
- 2016–2017: Baroka

Senior career*
Years	Team	Apps	(Gls)
2017–2021	Baroka	83	(0)
2021–	Orlando Pirates	35	(4)
2023–2024	→ Chippa United (loan)	22	(1)
2025–	→ Chippa United (loan)	13	(0)
- * Club domestic league appearances and goals as of 4 January 2026

Goodman Mosele (born 18 November 1999) is a South African soccer player who plays as a midfielder for South African Premier Division side Chippa United, on loan from Orlando Pirates.

== Early life and education ==
Born in Khuma, Mosele attended Vuyanimawethu Secondary School in Khuma before moving to Kopano High School in Lebowakgomo in 2016.

== Career ==
After playing for Stillfontein Real Hearts, Mosele joined Baroka in 2016, aged 16, after trials with the club.

He won the PSL Young Player of the Year award for the 2019–20 season.

In July 2021, Mosele signed for Orlando Pirates.
