= Sibusiso Mabiliso =

South African soccer player

Personal information
- Full name: Sibusiso Gideon Mabiliso
- Date of birth: 14 April 1999 (age 27)
- Place of birth: Rustenburg, South Africa
- Height: 1.75 m (5 ft 9 in)
- Position: Defender

Team information
- Current team: Baroka

Youth career
- –2017: Platinum Stars

Senior career*
Years	Team	Apps	(Gls)
2018–2021	AmaZulu	79	(1)
2021–2022	Kaizer Chiefs	6	(0)
2022–2024	AmaZulu	5	(0)
2024–	Baroka	1	(0)

International career^{‡}
2019	South Africa U20	5	(0)
2021	South Africa Olympic	1	(0)
2021	South Africa	1	(0)
- * Club domestic league appearances and goals as of 23 April 2024 ‡ National team caps and goals as of 23 April 2024

Sibusiso Gideon Mabiliso (born 14 April 1999) is a South African soccer player who plays as a defender for Baroka.

== Club career ==
Mabiliso was born in Rustenburg.

Mabiliso signed for Kaizer Chiefs in summer 2021. In August 2022, his contract with Chiefs was terminated by mutual consent, having made 6 appearances during the 2021–22 season. He resigned for AmaZulu two weeks later.

He was released by AmaZulu in January 2024.

== International career ==
He made his debut for South Africa national soccer team on 10 June 2021 in a friendly against Uganda. He was later selected for the South Africa Olympic team and appeared in their opening game at the Tokyo Olympics.

== Career statistics ==
=== Club ===
As of 10 December 2022

Appearances and goals by club, season and competition
Club	Season	League			Nedbank Cup		Telkom Knockout		Other		Total	
Club	Season	Division	Apps	Goals	Apps	Goals	Apps	Goals	Apps	Goals	Apps	Goals
AmaZulu	2017–18	South African Premier Division	17	0	2	0	0	0	0	0	19	0
AmaZulu	2018–19	South African Premier Division	21	1	0	0	2	0	0	0	23	1
AmaZulu	2019–20	South African Premier Division	17	0	1	0	1	0	0	0	19	0
AmaZulu	2020–21	South African Premier Division	24	0	1	0	0	0	0	0	25	0
AmaZulu	Total		79	1	4	0	3	0	0	0	86	1
Kaizer Chiefs	2021–22	South African Premier Division	6	0	0	0	0	0	0	0	6	0
AmaZulu	2022–23	South African Premier Division	1	0	0	0	0	0	0	0	1	0
Total			86	1	4	0	3	0	0	0	93	1
