= Thabo Cele =

South African footballer

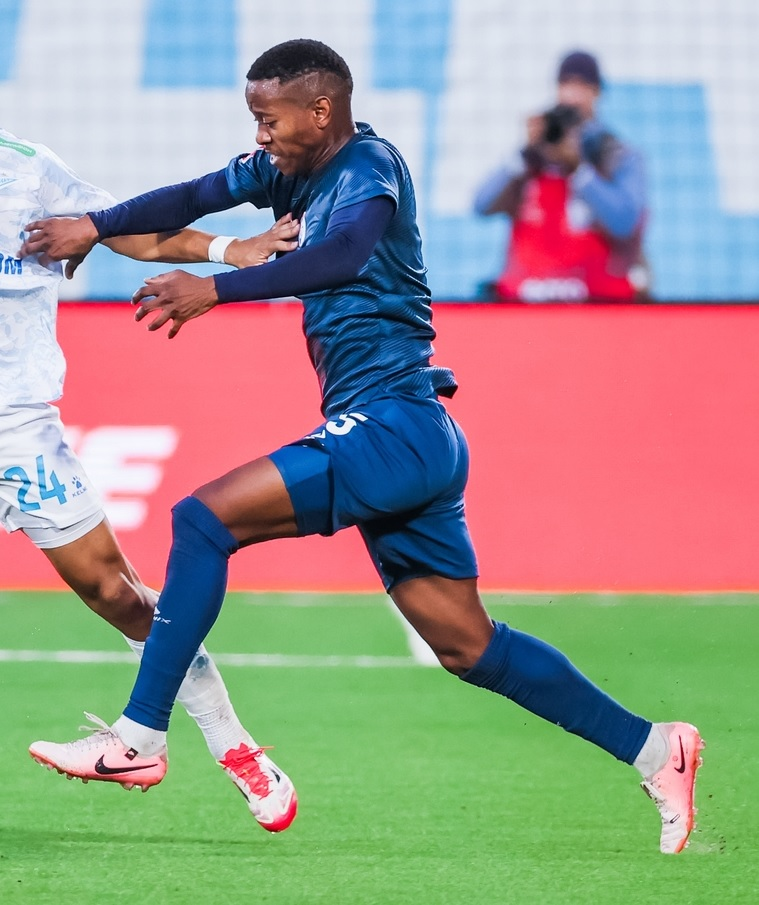
- Cele with Fakel Voronezh in 2024

Personal information
- Date of birth: 15 January 1997 (age 29)
- Place of birth: KwaMashu, South Africa
- Height: 1.78 m (5 ft 10 in)
- Position: Midfielder

Team information
- Current team: Kaizer Chiefs
- Number: 21

Youth career
- 2012-2013: Kwamashu Arsenal
- 2014–2015: KwaMashu All Stars
- 2015–2016: KZN Football Academy

Senior career*
| Years | Team | Apps | (Gls) |
| 2016–2017 | Real | 24 | (2) |
| 2017–2018 | Benfica B | 6 | (0) |
| 2018 | → Real (loan) | 14 | (1) |
| 2018–2021 | Cova da Piedade | 70 | (5) |
| 2021–2023 | Radomiak Radom | 33 | (0) |
| 2023–2025 | Fakel Voronezh | 18 | (0) |
| 2025– | Kaizer Chiefs | 21 | (0) |

International career^{‡}
| 2017 | South Africa U20 | 3 | (0) |
| 2019–2021 | South Africa U23 | 6 | (0) |
| 2017– | South Africa | 5 | (0) |
- * Club domestic league appearances and goals as of 4 January 2026 ‡ National team caps and goals as of 19:55, 14 July 2023 (UTC)

Thabo Cele (born 15 January 1997) is a South African professional soccer player who plays as a midfielder for Mamelodi Sundowns.

== Career ==
Cele was born in KwaMashu.

In 2016, Cele signed for Portuguese third division side Real from the KZN Academy in South Africa.

In 2017, he signed for Benfica, Portugal's most successful club, before returning to Real on loan.

In 2018, Cele moved to Cova da Piedade in the Portuguese second division.

On 12 October 2021, after training with the team since September, Cele joined Polish side Radomiak Radom on a two-year deal.

On 16 August 2023, Cele was transferred to Russian Premier League club Fakel Voronezh. In January 2025, Cele left Fakel by mutual consent.

On 27 January 2025, Cele signed a three-and-a-half-year contract with Kaizer Chiefs. In September 2026, he agreed to mutually terminate his contract with the club.

On 10 September 2026, Cele signed for Mamelodi Sundowns as a free agent on a two-year contract, with an option to extend the deal.

== Career statistics ==
=== Club ===
As of match played 9 November 2024

Appearances and goals by club, season and competition
| Club | Season | League | | | National cup (Note: Includes Taça de Portugal, Russian Cup) | | League cup (Note: Includes Taça da Liga) | | Continental | | Other | | Total | |
| Club | Season | Division | Apps | Goals | Apps | Goals | Apps | Goals | Apps | Goals | Apps | Goals | Apps | Goals |
|---|---|---|---|---|---|---|---|---|---|---|---|---|---|---|
| Real | 2016–17 | Campeonato de Portugal | 24 | 2 | 4 | 1 | 0 | 0 | — | | — | | 28 | 3 |
| Benfica B | 2017–18 | Liga Portugal 2 | 6 | 0 | — | | — | | — | | — | | 6 | 0 |
| Real (loan) | 2017–18 | Liga Portugal 2 | 14 | 1 | — | | — | | — | | — | | 14 | 1 |
| Cova da Piedade | 2018–19 | Liga Portugal 2 | 27 | 2 | 0 | 0 | 0 | 0 | 0 | 0 | 0 | 0 | 27 | 2 |
| Cova da Piedade | 2019–20 | Liga Portugal 2 | 14 | 0 | 0 | 0 | 1 | 0 | — | | — | | 15 | 0 |
| Cova da Piedade | 2020–21 | Liga Portugal 2 | 29 | 3 | 2 | 0 | 0 | 0 | — | | — | | 31 | 3 |
| Cova da Piedade | Total | | 70 | 5 | 2 | 0 | 1 | 0 | — | | — | | 73 | 5 |
| Radomiak Radom | 2021–22 | Ekstraklasa | 13 | 0 | 0 | 0 | — | | — | | — | | 13 | 0 |
| Radomiak Radom | 2022–23 | Ekstraklasa | 20 | 0 | 0 | 0 | — | | — | | — | | 20 | 0 |
| Radomiak Radom | Total | | 33 | 0 | 0 | 0 | — | | — | | — | | 33 | 0 |
| Fakel Voronezh | 2023–24 | Russian Premier League | 9 | 0 | 4 | 0 | — | | — | | — | | 13 | 0 |
| Fakel Voronezh | 2024–25 | Russian Premier League | 9 | 0 | 5 | 0 | — | | — | | — | | 14 | 0 |
| Fakel Voronezh | Total | | 18 | 0 | 9 | 0 | — | | — | | — | | 27 | 0 |
| Career total | | | 165 | 8 | 15 | 1 | 1 | 0 | 0 | 0 | 0 | 0 | 181 | 9 |

=== International ===
As of match played 14 July 2023

Appearances and goals by national team and year
| National team | Year | Apps | Goals |
|---|---|---|---|
South Africa
| South Africa | 2017 | 1 | 0 |
| South Africa | 2023 | 4 | 0 |
| Total | | 5 | 0 |

== Honours ==
Kaizer Chiefs

- Nedbank Cup: 2024–25

Mamelodi Sundowns

- MTN 8: 2026
- FIFA African–Asian–Pacific Cup: 2026
