= Thendo Mukumela =

South African soccer player

Personal information
- Date of birth: 30 January 1998 (age 28)
- Place of birth: Ngwenani, Limpopo, South Africa
- Height: 1.76 m (5 ft 9 in)
- Position: Defender

Team information
- Current team: Black Leopards

Youth career
- –2018: Mamelodi Sundowns

Senior career*
Years	Team	Apps	(Gls)
2018–2022	Cape Town Spurs (Note: Cape Town Spurs was known as Ajax Cape Town until September 2020.)	90	(17)
2022–2023	AmaZulu	3	(0)
2023–	Black Leopards	0	(0)

International career^{‡}
2015	South Africa U17	3	(1)
2017	South Africa U20	7	(0)
2019	South Africa U23	5	(1)
2017–2019	South Africa	6	(0)
- * Club domestic league appearances and goals as of 25 October 2023 ‡ National team caps and goals as of 13:46, 28 February 2021 (UTC)

Thendo Mukumela (born 30 January 1998) is a South African professional soccer player who plays for the South African soccer club Black Leopards. He has been capped for the South Africa national football team.

== Club career ==
Born in Ngwenani, Limpopo, South Africa, Mukumela started his career at Mamelodi Sundowns before joining Ajax Cape Town in 2018.

In June 2022, Mukumela joined AmaZulu.

== International career ==
Mukumela has represented South Africa at under-17, under-20, under-23 and senior international levels. Specifically, he was a squad member at the 2017 and 2019 COSAFA Cup.
