= Luke Fleurs =

South African soccer player (2000–2024)

Personal information
- Full name: Luke Donn Fleurs
- Date of birth: 3 March 2000
- Place of birth: Cape Town, South Africa
- Date of death: 3 April 2024 (aged 24)
- Place of death: Johannesburg, South Africa
- Height: 1.82 m (6 ft 0 in)
- Position: Centre-back

Youth career
- 2013–2017: Ubuntu Cape Town

Senior career*
Years	Team	Apps	(Gls)
2017–2018	Ubuntu Cape Town	18	(0)
2018–2023	SuperSport United	56	(2)
2023–2024	Kaizer Chiefs	0	(0)
Total		76	(2)

International career
2016	South Africa U17	5	(0)
2021	South Africa U23	4	(0)
- * Club domestic league appearances and goals

Luke Donn Fleurs (3 March 2000 – 3 April 2024) was a South African professional footballer who played as a centre-back for South African Premier Division side Kaizer Chiefs.

== Club career ==
Fleurs was born in Cape Town on 3 March 2000. He was from Mitchells Plain but moved to Fish Hoek after signing for Ubuntu Cape Town's academy in 2013, at the age of 13. He made his National First Division debut aged 17, and made 18 league appearances in his first season of professional football.

Fleurs signed for South African Premier Division club SuperSport United on a long-term deal in summer 2018.

On 26 October 2023, Fleurs joined fellow Premiership side Kaizer Chiefs, signing a two-year contract with an option for a further year.

== International career ==
Fleurs represented South Africa at under-20 level. He was called up for the Bafana Bafana in 2021 and 2022, albeit without receiving a cap.

== Death ==
Fleurs was shot dead in a hijacking on 3 April 2024, at the age of 24. The shooting took place at a petrol station in the Johannesburg suburb of Florida, during which the gunmen shot him in the upper body and fled with his vehicle.

The South African Premier Division said a moment of silence will be observed at all first and second-tier games on 6 and 7 April in memory of Fleurs. Six suspects were later arrested in Slovoville, Soweto and were believed to be members of a carjacking syndicate active in Gauteng. In the memory of Fleurs, Kaizer Chiefs retired jersey number 26.
