= MacBeth Mahlangu =

South African footballer

Personal information
- Full name: MacBeth Kamogelo Mahlangu
- Date of birth: 11 October 2001 (age 25)
- Place of birth: South Africa
- Position: Defender

Team information
- Current team: TS Galaxy
- Number: 4

Youth career
- TS Galaxy

Senior career*
Years	Team	Apps	(Gls)
2019–	TS Galaxy	50	(0)
- * Club domestic league appearances and goals as of 1 August 2023 ‡ National team caps and goals as of 19 July 2021

MacBeth Mahlangu (born 11 October 2001), is a South African professional soccer player who plays as a defender for TS Galaxy.
