= Katlego Mohamme =

South African footballer

Personal information
- Date of birth: 10 March 1998 (age 28)
- Place of birth: Soshanguve, Gauteng, South Africa
- Height: 1.83 m (6 ft 0 in)
- Position: Defender

Team information
- Current team: Sekhukhune United
- Number: 26

Youth career
- –2017: SuperSport United

Senior career*
| Years | Team | Apps | (Gls) |
| 2017–2019 | SuperSport United | 0 | (0) |
| 2017–2018 | → Sertanense (loan) | 23 | (1) |
| 2019–2021 | University of Pretoria | 47 | (0) |
| 2021–2023 | Moroka Swallows | 6 | (0) |
| 2023–2024 | Mamelodi Sundowns | 1 | (0) |
| 2024 | → Sekhukhune United (loan) | 4 | (0) |
| 2024– | Sekhukhune United | 12 | (0) |

International career^{‡}
| 2015 | South Africa U17 | 5 | (1) |
| 2017 | South Africa U20 | 4 | (0) |
| 2019– | South Africa U23 | 8 | (0) |
| 2019– | South Africa | 6 | (0) |
- * Club domestic league appearances and goals as of 4 January 2026 ‡ National team caps and goals as of 7 July 2023

Katlego Mohamme (born 10 March 1998) is a South African professional soccer player currently playing as a centre-back for Sekhukhune United.

== Career statistics ==
=== Club ===
As of 14 July 2021.

| Club | Season | League | | | National Cup | | League Cup | | Continental | | Other | | Total | |
| Club | Season | Division | Apps | Goals | Apps | Goals | Apps | Goals | Apps | Goals | Apps | Goals | Apps | Goals |
|---|---|---|---|---|---|---|---|---|---|---|---|---|---|---|
| SuperSport United | 2017–18 | South African Premier Division | 0 | 0 | 0 | 0 | 0 | 0 | – | | 0 | 0 | 0 | 0 |
| SuperSport United | 2018–19 | South African Premier Division | 0 | 0 | 0 | 0 | 0 | 0 | – | | 0 | 0 | 0 | 0 |
| SuperSport United | Total | | 0 | 0 | 0 | 0 | 0 | 0 | 0 | 0 | 0 | 0 | 0 | 0 |
| Sertanense (loan) | 2017–18 | Campeonato de Portugal | 23 | 1 | 0 | 0 | – | | – | | 0 | 0 | 23 | 1 |
| University of Pretoria | 2019–20 | National First Division | 26 | 0 | 0 | 0 | 0 | 0 | – | | 0 | 0 | 26 | 0 |
| University of Pretoria | 2020–21 | National First Division | 21 | 0 | 2 (Note: Appearances in the Nedbank Cup) | 0 | 0 | 0 | – | | 0 | 0 | 23 | 0 |
| University of Pretoria | 2021–22 | National First Division | 0 | 0 | 0 | 0 | 0 | 0 | – | | 0 | 0 | 0 | 0 |
| University of Pretoria | Total | | 47 | 0 | 2 | 0 | 0 | 0 | 0 | 0 | 0 | 0 | 49 | 0 |
| Career total | | | 70 | 1 | 2 | 0 | 0 | 0 | 0 | 0 | 0 | 0 | 72 | 1 |

=== International ===
As of matches played 7 July 2021.

Appearances and goals by national team and year
| National team | Year | Apps | Goals |
|---|---|---|---|
| South Africa | 2019 | 5 | 0 |
| South Africa | 2023 | 1 | 0 |
| Total | | 6 | 0 |
