= 2019 U-23 Africa Cup of Nations squads =

The following is a list of squads for each national team competing at the 2019 Africa U-23 Cup of Nations. The tournament took place in Egypt, between 8–22 November 2019. It was the third U-23 age group competition organised by the Confederation of African Football (CAF).

The 8 national teams involved in the tournament were required to register a squad of 21 players, including three goalkeepers. Only players in these squads were eligible to take part in the tournament. Players born on or after 1 January 1997 were eligible to compete in the tournament. On 5 November 2019, CAF published the final lists with squad numbers on their website.

The full squad listings are below. The position listed for each player is per the official squad list published by CAF. The age listed for each player is on 8 November 2019, the first day of the tournament. The nationality for each club reflects the national association (not the league) to which the club is affiliated. A flag is included for coaches who are of a different nationality than their own national team.

Players marked in boldface have been capped at full international level.

== Group A ==
=== Egypt ===
Coach: Shawky Gharieb

The preliminary squad was announced on 23 October 2019. The final squad was announced on 29 October 2019.

No.	Pos.	Player	Date of birth (age)	Club
1	GK	Omar Radwan	31 July 1997 (aged 22)	(Egyptian Football Association) El Gouna
2	FW	**Amar Hamdy**	7 March 1999 (aged 20)	(Egyptian Football Association) Al Ahly
3	DF	Mahmoud Saber	20 February 1998 (aged 21)	(Egyptian Football Association) El Gouna
4	DF	**Osama Galal**	17 September 1997 (aged 22)	(Egyptian Football Association) ENPPI
5	DF	Mohamed Abdel Salam	1 October 1997 (aged 22)	(Egyptian Football Association) Zamalek
6	MF	**Mohamed Sadek**	6 July 1997 (aged 22)	(Egyptian Football Association) Ismaily
7	FW	**Salah Mohsen**	1 September 1998 (aged 21)	(Egyptian Football Association) Al Ahly
8	MF	Nasser Maher	8 February 1997 (aged 22)	(Egyptian Football Association) Smouha
9	FW	Nasser Mansi	16 November 1997 (aged 21)	(Egyptian Football Association) Tala'ea El Gaish
10	MF	**Ramadan Sobhi**	23 January 1997 (aged 22)	(Egyptian Football Association) Al Ahly
11	FW	**Mostafa Mohamed**	28 November 1997 (aged 21)	(Egyptian Football Association) Zamalek
12	MF	**Akram Tawfik**	8 November 1997 (aged 22)	(Egyptian Football Association) El Gouna
13	DF	Karim El-Eraky	29 November 1997 (aged 21)	(Egyptian Football Association) Al Masry
14	FW	**Ahmed Yasser Rayyan**	1 January 1998 (aged 21)	(Egyptian Football Association) El Gouna
15	FW	**Emam Ashour**	20 February 1998 (aged 21)	(Egyptian Football Association) Zamalek
16	GK	Omar Salah	10 January 1998 (aged 21)	(Egyptian Football Association) Smouha
17	DF	Ahmed Ramadan	23 March 1997 (aged 22)	(Egyptian Football Association) Wadi Degla
18	MF	Ghanam Mohamed	12 March 1997 (aged 22)	(Egyptian Football Association) El Entag El Harby
19	MF	**Abdel Rahman Magdy**	12 September 1997 (aged 22)	(Egyptian Football Association) Ismaily
20	DF	**Ahmed Fatouh**	22 March 1998 (aged 21)	(Egyptian Football Association) Smouha
21	GK	**Mohamed Sobhy**	15 July 1999 (aged 20)	(Egyptian Football Association) Zamalek

=== Mali ===
Coach: Fanyeri Diarra

The final squad was announced on 26 October 2019.

No.	Pos.	Player	Date of birth (age)	Club
1	GK	Samuel Diarra	11 August 1998 (aged 21)	(Royal Spanish Football Federation) Cultural Leonesa
2	DF	Felix Kamaté	31 December 2000 (aged 18)	(Malian Football Federation) Real Bamako
3	DF	**Siaka Bagayoko**	4 July 1998 (aged 21)	(Tunisian Football Federation) CS Sfaxien
4	DF	Souleymane Gassama	30 November 1998 (aged 20)	(Royal Spanish Football Federation) UD SANSE
5	DF	Issouf Traoré	22 January 1998 (aged 21)	(Royal Moroccan Football Federation) Olympique Khouribga
6	DF	**Moussa Sissako**	10 November 2000 (aged 18)	(French Football Federation) Paris Saint-Germain
7	MF	Moussa Bagayoko	3 February 1998 (aged 21)	(Turkish Football Federation) Adanaspor
8	MF	**Boubacar Traoré**	20 August 2001 (aged 18)	(French Football Federation) Metz
9	FW	Aly Mallé	3 April 1998 (aged 21)	(Turkish Football Federation) Balıkesirspor
10	FW	**Ibrahima Koné**	16 June 1999 (aged 20)	(Norwegian Football Federation) Haugesund
11	FW	El Bilal Touré	3 October 2001 (aged 18)	(Malian Football Federation) Afrique Football Élite
12	MF	Bourama Doumbia	3 October 1997 (aged 22)	(Malian Football Federation) Stade Malien
13	MF	Clément Kanouté	1 September 1999 (aged 20)	(Latvian Football Federation) FK Liepāja
14	FW	Diadié Samadiaré	9 February 2000 (aged 19)	(Malian Football Federation) Yeelen Olympique
15	MF	Maharafa Tandina	18 August 1997 (aged 22)	(Football Association of Bosnia and Herzegovina) Mladost Kakanj
16	GK	Youssouf Koïta	27 August 2000 (aged 19)	(Royal Spanish Football Federation) Girona
17	MF	Amadou Diarra	8 June 1999 (aged 20)	(Royal Spanish Football Federation) Cultural Leonesa
18	MF	**Aliou Dieng**	16 October 1997 (aged 22)	(Egyptian Football Association) Al Ahly
19	MF	**Ibrahim Kane**	23 June 2000 (aged 19)	(Ukrainian Association of Football) Vorskla Poltava
20	MF	Seydou N'daw	17 October 1997 (aged 22)	(Turkish Football Federation) Boluspor
21	GK	Drissa Kouyaté	17 December 1998 (aged 20)	(Guinean Football Federation) Hafia

=== Cameroon ===
Coach: Rigobert Song

The preliminary squad was announced on 2 October 2019. The final squad was announced on 29 October 2019.

No.	Pos.	Player	Date of birth (age)	Club
1	GK	Junior Dande	22 February 1998 (aged 21)	(Cameroonian Football Federation) APEJES Academy
2	DF	**Duplexe Tchamba**	10 July 1998 (aged 21)	(Norwegian Football Federation) Strømsgodset
3	DF	Jules Youmeni	29 June 1998 (aged 21)	(Danish Football Association) FC Roskilde
4	DF	Oumar Gonzalez	25 February 1998 (aged 21)	(French Football Federation) FC Chambly
5	DF	**Nouhou Tolo**	23 June 1997 (aged 22)	(United States Soccer Federation) Seattle Sounders FC
6	MF	**Samuel Gouet**	14 December 1997 (aged 21)	(Austrian Football Association) Rheindorf Altach
7	FW	**Franck Evina**	5 July 2000 (aged 19)	(German Football Association) KFC Uerdingen
8	MF	**Yan Eteki**	26 August 1997 (aged 22)	(Royal Spanish Football Federation) Granada
9	MF	Victor Ekani	27 February 1997 (aged 22)	(Danish Football Association) SønderjyskE Fodbold
10	MF	**Kévin Soni**	17 April 1998 (aged 21)	(Royal Spanish Football Federation) Espanyol
11	FW	Eric Ayuk	17 February 1997 (aged 22)	(Turkish Football Federation) Osmanlıspor
12	FW	Michael Cheukoua	13 January 1997 (aged 22)	(Austrian Football Association) SV Horn
13	DF	Raphaël Anaba	8 March 2000 (aged 19)	(French Football Federation) Olympique Lyon
14	DF	Guy Kilama	30 May 1999 (aged 20)	(French Football Federation) Chamois Niortais
15	DF	**Olivier Mbaizo**	15 August 1997 (aged 22)	(United States Soccer Federation) Philadelphia Union
16	GK	Sylvain Abogo	18 July 1998 (aged 21)	(Cameroonian Football Federation) Tonnerre Yaoundé
17	FW	Hervé Ngan	2 June 1998 (aged 21)	(Hellenic Football Federation) PAE Kerkyra
18	MF	**Martin Hongla**	16 March 1998 (aged 21)	(Royal Belgian Football Association) Royal Antwerp
19	FW	Stéphane Zobo	2 August 2000 (aged 19)	(French Football Federation) Toulouse
20	FW	Pierre Fonkeu	10 July 1997 (aged 22)	(French Football Federation) RC Lens
21	GK	**Simon Omossola**	5 May 1998 (aged 21)	(Cameroonian Football Federation) Coton Sport

=== Ghana ===
Coach: Ibrahim Tanko

The preliminary squad was announced on 9 October 2019. The final squad was announced on 1 November 2019.

No.	Pos.	Player	Date of birth (age)	Club
1	GK	Kwame Baah	21 April 1998 (aged 21)	(Ghana Football Association) Asante Kotoko
2	DF	Kingsley Fobi	20 September 1998 (aged 21)	(Royal Spanish Football Federation) CD Badajoz
3	DF	Edward Sarpong	17 January 1997 (aged 22)	(Portuguese Football Federation) Esperança Lagos
4	DF	Emmanuel Cudjoe	11 April 1998 (aged 21)	(Ghana Football Association) Attram De Visser
5	FW	Frank Arhin	16 February 1999 (aged 20)	(Swedish Football Association) Östersund
6	DF	Zakaria Fuseini	23 September 1998 (aged 21)	(Ghana Football Association) Berekum Chelsea
7	FW	**Owusu Kwabena**	18 July 1997 (aged 22)	(Royal Spanish Football Federation) Córdoba CF
8	MF	Osei Wusu	25 November 2000 (aged 18)	(Ghana Football Association) Tema Youth
9	FW	Robin Polley	28 December 1998 (aged 20)	(Royal Dutch Football Association) ADO Den Haag
10	MF	**Yaw Yeboah**	28 March 1997 (aged 22)	(Royal Spanish Football Federation) Celta Vigo
11	MF	**Emmanuel Lomotey**	19 December 1997 (aged 21)	(Royal Spanish Football Federation) Extremadura UD
12	DF	William Dankyi	4 September 1999 (aged 20)	(Ghana Football Association) Hearts of Oak
13	MF	Michael Agbekpornu	31 August 1998 (aged 21)	(Ghana Football Association) Dreams FC
14	MF	Abass Issah	26 September 1998 (aged 21)	(Royal Dutch Football Association) Utrecht
15	MF	Simon Zibo	30 November 1997 (aged 21)	(Portuguese Football Federation) Vitória Guimarães
16	GK	Richmond Ayi	4 June 1997 (aged 22)	(Ghana Football Association) Hearts of Oak
17	DF	**Habib Mohammed**	4 July 1997 (aged 22)	(Ghana Football Association) Asante Kotoko
18	FW	Samuel Obeng	15 May 1997 (aged 22)	(Royal Spanish Football Federation) Real Oviedo
19	MF	Abdul-Aziz Nurudeen	11 September 1998 (aged 21)	(Ghana Football Association) Vision FC
20	MF	**Evans Mensah**	9 February 1998 (aged 21)	(Football Association of Finland) HJK Helsinki
21	GK	**Ibrahim Danlad**	2 December 2002 (aged 16)	(Ghana Football Association) Asante Kotoko

== Group B ==
=== Nigeria ===
Coach: Imama Amapakabo

The final squad was announced on 31 October 2019.

No.	Pos.	Player	Date of birth (age)	Club
1	GK	Abubakar Adamu Mohammed	9 June 1997 (aged 22)	(Nigeria Football Federation) Wikki Tourists
2	DF	Josiah Chukwudi	14 July 1999 (aged 20)	(Slovak Football Association) Spartak Trnava
3	DF	Seth Sincere	28 April 1998 (aged 21)	(Turkish Football Federation) Boluspor
4	DF	**Valentine Ozornwafor**	1 June 1999 (aged 20)	(Royal Spanish Football Federation) UD Almería
5	DF	**Izuchuckwu Anthony**	3 November 1997 (aged 22)	(Norwegian Football Federation) Nest-Sotra
6	DF	**Olisa Ndah**	21 January 1998 (aged 21)	(Nigeria Football Federation) Remo Stars
7	MF	**Sunday Faleye**	29 November 1998 (aged 20)	(Austrian Football Association) Wacker Innsbruck
8	MF	Orji Okwonkwo	19 January 1998 (aged 21)	(Canadian Soccer Association) Montreal Impact
9	FW	**Taiwo Awoniyi**	12 August 1997 (aged 22)	(German Football Association) Mainz
10	MF	Kelechi Nwakali	5 June 1998 (aged 21)	(Royal Spanish Football Federation) SD Huesca
11	MF	Olabiran Muyiwa	7 September 1998 (aged 21)	(Russian Football Union) Tambov
12	DF	Godfrey Stephen	22 August 2000 (aged 19)	(Football Federation of Belarus) Isloch Minsk Raion
13	DF	Samuel Atavti	9 August 1999 (aged 20)	(Tunisian Football Federation) Espérance Tunis
14	MF	**Azubuike Okechukwu**	19 April 1997 (aged 22)	(Turkish Football Federation) İstanbul Başakşehir
15	MF	Aliyu Yau Adam	7 May 2000 (aged 19)	(Latvian Football Federation) Spartaks Jūrmala
16	GK	Mohammed Galadima	17 November 2000 (aged 18)	(Nigeria Football Federation) Nasarawa United
17	MF	**Ndifreke Udo**	15 August 1998 (aged 21)	(Nigeria Football Federation) Akwa United
18	FW	Bright Enobakhare	8 February 1998 (aged 21)	(The Football Association) Wigan Athletic
19	MF	Tom Dele-Bashiru	17 September 1999 (aged 20)	(The Football Association) Watford
20	FW	**Sunusi Ibrahim**	1 October 2002 (aged 17)	(Nigeria Football Federation) Nasarawa United
21	GK	Kingdom Osayi	17 January 1999 (aged 20)	(Nigeria Football Federation) Giant Brillars

=== Ivory Coast ===
Coach: Soualiho Haïdara

The final squad was announced on 30 October 2019.

No.	Pos.	Player	Date of birth (age)	Club
1	GK	Oupoh Nagoli	20 December 2000 (aged 18)	(Ivorian Football Federation) SOL FC
2	MF	Koffi Kouao	20 May 1998 (aged 21)	(Portuguese Football Federation) Vizela
3	DF	Kouadio-Yves Dabila	1 January 1997 (aged 22)	(Royal Belgian Football Association) Cercle Brugge
4	MF	Idrissa Doumbia	14 April 1998 (aged 21)	(Portuguese Football Federation) Sporting CP
5	FW	Aboubacar Doumbia	12 November 1999 (aged 19)	(Ivorian Football Federation) SO de l'Armée
6	DF	Zié Ouattara	9 January 2000 (aged 19)	(Portuguese Football Federation) Vitória Guimarães
7	DF	Cheick Timité	20 November 1997 (aged 21)	(French Football Federation) Amiens
8	FW	**Hamed Traorè**	16 February 2000 (aged 19)	(Italian Football Federation) Sassuolo
9	FW	Youssouf Dao	5 March 1998 (aged 21)	(Football Association of the Czech Republic) Sparta Prague
10	MF	Anderson Niangbo	6 October 1999 (aged 20)	(Austrian Football Association) Wolfsberger AC
11	FW	**Christian Kouamé**	6 December 1997 (aged 21)	(Italian Football Federation) Genoa
12	DF	Jonathan Cissé	18 May 1997 (aged 22)	(Israel Football Association) Hapoel Hadera
13	MF	Koffi Dakoi	26 August 1999 (aged 20)	(Mexican Football Federation) Correcaminos
14	MF	Aboubakar Keita	5 November 1997 (aged 22)	(Royal Belgian Football Association) OH Leuven
15	DF	Silas Gnaka	18 December 1998 (aged 20)	(Royal Belgian Football Association) Eupen
16	GK	Eliezer Tapé Ira	31 August 1997 (aged 22)	(Ivorian Football Federation) San Pédro
17	DF	Ismaël Diallo	29 January 1997 (aged 22)	(French Football Federation) Ajaccio
18	MF	Jean Thierry Lazare	7 March 1998 (aged 21)	(Royal Belgian Football Association) Eupen
19	FW	Baba Lamine Traoré	16 May 1998 (aged 21)	(Football Association of the Czech Republic) Sparta Prague
20	MF	**Ibrahim Sangaré**	2 December 1997 (aged 21)	(French Football Federation) Toulouse
21	GK	Nicolas Tié	13 February 2001 (aged 18)	(The Football Association) Chelsea

=== South Africa ===
Coach: David Notoane

The final squad was announced on 1 November 2019.

No.	Pos.	Player	Date of birth (age)	Club
1	GK	Andile Mbanjwa	30 March 1998 (aged 21)	(South African Football Association) Richards Bay
2	FW	Itumeleng Shopane	16 June 1997 (aged 22)	(South African Football Association) Moroka Swallows
3	DF	**Katlego Mohamme**	10 March 1998 (aged 21)	(South African Football Association) University of Pretoria
4	MF	**Teboho Mokoena**	24 January 1997 (aged 22)	(South African Football Association) SuperSport United
5	MF	**Athenkosi Dlala**	6 February 1998 (aged 21)	(South African Football Association) University of Pretoria
6	MF	**Kamohelo Mahlatsi**	23 August 1998 (aged 21)	(South African Football Association) University of Pretoria
7	MF	Kegan Johannes	31 March 2001 (aged 18)	(South African Football Association) Ajax Cape Town
8	MF	**Grant Margeman**	3 June 1998 (aged 21)	(South African Football Association) Ajax Cape Town
9	FW	**Lyle Foster**	4 September 2000 (aged 19)	(Royal Belgian Football Association) Cercle Brugge
10	FW	Matlala Makgalwa	3 January 1997 (aged 22)	(South African Football Association) Mamelodi Sundowns
11	MF	**Luther Singh**	5 August 1997 (aged 22)	(Portuguese Football Federation) Moreirense
12	MF	**Sipho Mbule**	22 March 1998 (aged 21)	(South African Football Association) SuperSport United
13	MF	Happy Mashiane	1 January 1998 (aged 21)	(South African Football Association) Kaizer Chiefs
14	DF	**Siyabonga Ngezana**	15 July 1997 (aged 22)	(South African Football Association) Kaizer Chiefs
15	DF	**Tercious Malepe**	18 February 1997 (aged 22)	(South African Football Association) Chippa United
16	GK	Darren Johnson	22 February 1997 (aged 22)	(South African Football Association) Ajax Cape Town
17	DF	Thabiso Monyane	30 April 2000 (aged 19)	(South African Football Association) Orlando Pirates
18	DF	**Thendo Mukumela**	30 January 1998 (aged 21)	(South African Football Association) Ajax Cape Town
19	MF	Kobamelo Kodisang	28 August 1999 (aged 20)	(Portuguese Football Federation) Braga
20	GK	**Mondli Mpoto**	24 July 1998 (aged 21)	(South African Football Association) Bloemfontein Celtic
21	DF	**Keanu Cupido**	15 January 1998 (aged 21)	(South African Football Association) Cape Town City

=== Zambia ===
Coach: Beston Chambeshi

The preliminary squad was announced on 5 October 2019. The squad was then trimmed-down on 21 October 2019. The final squad was announced on 29 October 2019.

No.	Pos.	Player	Date of birth (age)	Club
1	GK	Mangani Banda	13 July 1997 (aged 22)	(Football Association of Zambia) Zanaco
2	DF	**Moses Nyondo**	5 July 1997 (aged 22)	(Football Association of Zambia) Nkana
3	DF	Prosper Chiluya	2 April 1998 (aged 21)	(Football Association of Zambia) Kabwe Warriors
4	DF	**Kebson Kamanga**	16 June 1997 (aged 22)	(Football Association of Zambia) Zanaco
5	DF	Solomon Sakala	28 April 1997 (aged 22)	(Football Association of Zambia) ZESCO United
6	MF	Field Kandela	30 June 1998 (aged 21)	(Football Association of Zambia) Kabwe Warriors
7	FW	**Lameck Banda**	29 January 2001 (aged 18)	(Russian Football Union) Arsenal Tula
8	MF	Harrison Chisala	4 August 1997 (aged 22)	(Football Association of Zambia) Nkana
9	MF	Oliver Lumbiya	20 June 2000 (aged 19)	(Football Association of Zambia) Nkana
10	FW	**Fashion Sakala**	14 March 1997 (aged 22)	(Royal Belgian Football Association) KV Oostende
11	MF	**Enock Mwepu**	1 January 1998 (aged 21)	(Austrian Football Association) Red Bull Salzburg
12	MF	**Emmanuel Banda**	29 September 1997 (aged 22)	(Royal Belgian Football Association) KV Oostende
13	DF	**Shemmy Mayembe**	22 November 1997 (aged 21)	(Football Association of Zambia) ZESCO United
14	FW	**Edward Chilufya**	17 September 1999 (aged 20)	(Swedish Football Association) Djurgården
15	FW	Biston Banda	12 June 1999 (aged 20)	(Football Association of Zambia) Buildcon
16	GK	Patrick Chooma	4 October 2001 (aged 18)	(Football Association of Zambia) Kabwe Youth Soccer Academy
17	MF	**Kings Kangwa**	6 April 1999 (aged 20)	(Russian Football Union) Arsenal Tula
18	GK	Bradley Mweene	17 January 1999 (aged 20)	(South African Football Association) Real Kings
19	MF	**Ngosa Sunzu**	19 June 1998 (aged 21)	(Football Association of Zambia) Buildcon
20	FW	**Patson Daka**	9 October 1998 (aged 21)	(Austrian Football Association) Red Bull Salzburg
21	DF	Benson Chali	2 December 1997 (aged 21)	(Football Association of Zambia) Forest Rangers
