= 2015 African U-17 Championship squads =

Each team can register a squad of 21 players (three of whom must be goalkeepers).

Players marked in boldface have been capped at full international level.

== Group A ==
=== Guinea ===
Head Coach: Hamidou Camara

No.	Pos.	Player	Date of birth (age)	Club
1	GK	**Moussa Camara**	27 November 1998 (aged 16)	(Guinean Football Federation) Milo F.C.
2	DF	Mohamed Mory Kourouma	8 March 1998 (aged 16)	(Guinean Football Federation) Aide & Action
3	DF	Fodé Camara	17 April 1998 (aged 16)	(Guinean Football Federation) CEFOMIG
4	DF	Moussa Soumah	1 January 1998 (aged 17)	(Guinean Football Federation) CEFOMIG
5	DF	Mohamed Camara	1 November 1998 (aged 16)	(Guinean Football Federation) Fello Star
6	MF	Alseny Soumah	16 May 1998 (aged 16)	(Guinean Football Federation) F.C. Atouga
7	MF	Morlaye Sylla	27 July 1998 (aged 16)	(Guinean Football Federation) F.C. Tanerie
8	MF	**Karim Conté**	25 August 1999 (aged 15)	(Senegalese Football Federation) Aspire Senegal
9	FW	Mohamed Lamine Thorn	22 July 1998 (aged 16)	(Guinean Football Federation) Aspire Academy (Conakry)
10	FW	Naby Bangoura	29 March 1998 (aged 16)	(Guinean Football Federation) Falessade
11	MF	**Jules Keita**	20 July 1998 (aged 16)	(Guinean Football Federation) F.C. Atouga
12	FW	Lansana Touré	8 September 1998 (aged 16)	(Guinean Football Federation) Atletico
13	MF	Ibrahima Camara	17 May 1999 (aged 15)	(Guinean Football Federation) F.C. Atouga
14	FW	Yamodou Touré	5 August 1998 (aged 16)	(Guinean Football Federation) Aide & Action
15	MF	Alhassane Soumah	23 October 1999 (aged 15)	(Senegalese Football Federation) Aspire Senegal
16	GK	Djibril Yattara	10 March 1998 (aged 16)	(Guinean Football Federation) Atletico
17	DF	Aboubacar Touré	14 June 1998 (aged 16)	(Guinean Football Federation) Academie Kabassan
18	MF	Junior Doumbouya	16 February 1999 (aged 15)	(Guinean Football Federation) Horoya AC
19	FW	Sam Diallo	28 April 1998 (aged 16)	(Guinean Football Federation) F.C. Atouga
20	MF	Mohamed Drame	31 March 1998 (aged 16)	(Guinean Football Federation) Academie Magic
21	GK	Fodé Conté	15 March 1998 (aged 16)	(Guinean Football Federation) AS Abora

=== Niger ===
Head Coach: (Spain) Francisco Castaño Benito

No.	Pos.	Player	Date of birth (age)	Club
1	GK	Abdoul Kahar	7 September 1999 (aged 15)	(Ghana Football Association) Tudize Academy
2	DF	Malick Saidou Gonda	28 December 1998 (aged 16)	(Nigerien Football Federation) Saca Sport
3	FW	Ismael Rabiou Lara	15 January 1999 (aged 16)	(Nigerien Football Federation) Saca Sport
4	DF	Djabiri Mossi	10 October 1999 (aged 15)	(Nigerien Football Federation) Air Academy
5	DF	**Abdoulaye Karim Doudou**	25 September 1998 (aged 16)	(Ghana Football Association) Unista Soccer
6	MF	**Issah Salou**	4 February 1999 (aged 16)	(Ghana Football Association) Sporting Club
7	MF	Mohamed Salifou Moussa	16 November 1998 (aged 16)	(Ghana Football Association) Saint Stars F
8	MF	Mahamadou Salifou Godia	27 February 1999 (aged 15)	(Ghana Football Association) Right To Dream Academy
9	FW	Issoufou Boubacar	12 August 1998 (aged 16)	(Ghana Football Association) Unista Soccer
10	MF	Souradjou Alhassane	1 January 1998 (aged 17)	(Ghana Football Association) Unista Soccer
11	FW	Ibrahim Issoufou Idi	27 November 1998 (aged 16)	(Nigerien Football Federation) Atcha
12	GK	Ismael Salou Hamani	15 July 1999 (aged 15)	(Nigerien Football Federation) Mano Dayak
13	MF	Almoctar Ide Maiguizo	1 January 1999 (aged 16)	(Nigerien Football Federation) Air Academy
14	DF	Yahya Sadou Moussa	11 November 1998 (aged 16)	(Ghana Football Association) Glow Lamp/Soccer
15	DF	Assoumane Djibo	1 January 1998 (aged 17)	(Ghana Football Association) Aveca Academy
16	GK	Soumaïla Daouda	23 October 1998 (aged 16)	(Nigerien Football Federation) AS Nigelec
17	MF	Sanoussi Mahamat	1 January 1999 (aged 16)	(Nigerien Football Federation) Soko Academy
18	DF	Adamou Djibo	13 August 1998 (aged 16)	(Nigerien Football Federation) Atcha
19	MF	Moctar Djibrilla Daouda	12 December 1999 (aged 15)	(Nigerien Football Federation) Atcha
20	MF	Moctar Oumar Mahamane	1 January 1999 (aged 16)	(Nigerien Football Federation) Matassa Academie
21	FW	Alfousseini Abdoulaye Konaté	5 May 1999 (aged 15)	(Nigerien Football Federation) Soko Academy

=== Nigeria ===
Head Coach: Emmanuel Amuneke

No.	Pos.	Player	Date of birth (age)	Club
1	GK	Amos Benjamin	22 December 1998 (aged 16)	(Nigeria Football Federation) Abuja Football College
2	DF	John Lazarus	6 June 1998 (aged 16)	(Nigeria Football Federation) Fosla Academy Abuja
3	DF	Usman Abbas	10 July 1998 (aged 16)	(Nigeria Football Federation) FC Heart Academy
4	DF	Saddam Awal	24 November 1998 (aged 16)	(Nigeria Football Federation) Unity Academy
5	DF	Chibueze Kanu	14 September 1998 (aged 16)	(Nigeria Football Federation) Josey Academy
6	MF	**Kingsley Michael**	26 August 1999 (aged 15)	(Nigeria Football Federation) Abuja Football College
7	MF	Abdullahi Suleiman	22 March 1998 (aged 16)	(Nigeria Football Federation) Abuja Football College
8	FW	Orji Okwonkwo	19 January 1998 (aged 17)	(Nigeria Football Federation) Abuja Football College
9	FW	**Victor Osimhen**	29 December 1998 (aged 16)	(Nigeria Football Federation) Ultimate Strikers Academy
10	MF	Kelechi Nwakali	5 June 1998 (aged 16)	(Nigeria Football Federation) ASJ Academy
11	FW	Christian Charles	20 February 1998 (aged 16)	(Nigeria Football Federation) Orlu Football Academy
12	DF	Paul Maxwell	1 March 2000 (aged 14)	(Nigeria Football Federation) Everlasting Football Academy
13	DF	Uko Anietie	18 May 1998 (aged 16)	Nigeria Football Federation U-15
14	FW	Nazifi Yahaya	16 December 2000 (aged 14)	Nigeria Football Federation U-15
15	DF	Ayodeji Bamidele	3 September 1998 (aged 16)	(Nigeria Football Federation) Abuja Football College
16	GK	Akpan Udoh	18 July 1999 (aged 15)	(Nigeria Football Federation) Remo Football Academy
17	FW	Osinachi Christian Ebere	4 April 1998 (aged 16)	(Nigeria Football Federation) ASJ Academy
18	DF	Lukman Zakari	23 December 1998 (aged 16)	(Nigeria Football Federation) Unity Academy
19	FW	Suleiman Muhammed	15 February 2000 (aged 15)	Nigeria Football Federation U-15
20	FW	**Samuel Chukwueze**	22 May 1999 (aged 15)	(Nigeria Football Federation) Diamond F.C.
21	GK	Nwokoecha Chukwuebuka	2 August 1998 (aged 16)	(Nigeria Football Federation) Diamond F.C.

=== Zambia ===
Head Coach: Chris Kaunda

No.	Pos.	Player	Date of birth (age)	Club
1	GK	Daniel Sikanyika	29 December 1998 (aged 16)	(Football Association of Zambia) Damien Academy
2	DF	Gift Sikaonga	24 December 1998 (aged 16)	(Football Association of Zambia) Nchanga Rangers F.C.
3	DF	Prosper Chiluya	2 April 1998 (aged 16)	(Football Association of Zambia) OYDC
4	DF	Salati Lungu	16 August 1998 (aged 16)	(Football Association of Zambia) Lysa
5	DF	Wayne Museba	12 November 1998 (aged 16)	(Football Association of Zambia) Premium Sports
6	MF	Victor Chungu	1 December 1998 (aged 16)	(Football Association of Zambia) Lysa
7	MF	Edwin Chipile	17 June 1998 (aged 16)	(Football Association of Zambia) Zesco Malaiti Rangers
8	MF	Pumulo Siwanga	16 October 1998 (aged 16)	(Football Association of Zambia) Chirundu United
9	FW	**Patson Daka**	19 October 1998 (aged 16)	(Football Association of Zambia) Nchanga Rangers F.C.
10	FW	Musonda Siame	7 December 1998 (aged 16)	(Football Association of Zambia) Kafue Celtic
11	MF	**Enock Mwepu**	1 January 1998 (aged 17)	(Football Association of Zambia) Kafue Celtic
12	FW	Alfred Chirwa	2 February 1998 (aged 17)	(Football Association of Zambia) Intersport
13	MF	Edward Chimfwembe	28 September 1998 (aged 16)	(Football Association of Zambia) Lysa
14	MF	**Ngosa Sunzu**	19 June 1998 (aged 16)	(Football Association of Zambia) Zesco Victoria Falls
15	FW	Stephen Chulu	30 September 1998 (aged 16)	(Football Association of Zambia) Kabwe Youth Academy
16	GK	**Jackson Kakunta**	24 October 1998 (aged 16)	(Football Association of Zambia) Kabwata Dynamos
17	DF	Garry Mwelwa	23 March 1999 (aged 15)	(Football Association of Zambia) Gomes F.C.
18	DF	Kenny Sinkala	1 March 1998 (aged 16)	(Football Association of Zambia) F.C. Deejays
19	MF	Mwansa Mwila	12 March 1998 (aged 16)	(Football Association of Zambia) Prison Leopards
20	MF	Peter Nyirenda	15 May 1998 (aged 16)	(Football Association of Zambia) Zesco Kabwe
21	GK	Albert Mwanza	4 June 1998 (aged 16)	(Football Association of Zambia) Lumwana

== Group B ==
=== Cameroon ===
Head Coach: Joseph Atangana

No.	Pos.	Player	Date of birth (age)	Club
1	GK	Cedric Girex Djomo Tchotcheu	20 December 1998 (aged 16)	(Cameroonian Football Federation) Fundesport de Douala
2	DF	Moussa Kalamou Epesse	23 January 1998 (aged 17)	(Cameroonian Football Federation) Real Football Academie
3	DF	Mvondo Jean Vincent	30 June 1999 (aged 15)	(Cameroonian Football Federation) AS Fortuna de Yaounde
4	DF	Keita Ouambo Toukam	29 June 2000 (aged 14)	(Cameroonian Football Federation) Kadji Sport Academy
5	MF	**Martin Ako Assomo**	21 December 1999 (aged 15)	(Cameroonian Football Federation) Nkufor Academy Sport
6	MF	Felix Djoubairou	10 March 1998 (aged 16)	(Cameroonian Football Federation) Cotnsport F.C. de Garoua
7	FW	Fokem Namekong Achille	25 December 1999 (aged 15)	(Cameroonian Football Federation) Union Sportive de Douala
8	MF	Guillaume Morel Ngono Ngoah	13 October 1998 (aged 16)	(Cameroonian Football Federation) Kadji Sport Academie
9	FW	Christian Emmanuel Nguidjol Bayemi	25 December 1998 (aged 16)	(Cameroonian Football Federation) Nkufor Academy Sport
10	FW	Moïse Sakava	26 December 2000 (aged 14)	(Cameroonian Football Federation) Maroua F.C.
11	FW	Fabrice Ofon	10 February 1999 (aged 16)	(Cameroonian Football Federation) Best Stars de Limbe
12	MF	Pierre Jean Marie Messouke Etiegnie Oloumou	20 February 1998 (aged 16)	(Cameroonian Football Federation) Nkufor Academy Sport
13	FW	Stéphane Zobo	2 August 2000 (aged 14)	(Cameroonian Football Federation) Azur Star de Yaoundé
14	FW	Steve Kingue	16 October 2001 (aged 13)	(Cameroonian Football Federation) Nkufor Academy Sport
15	FW	Jean Paul Komo Atangana	2 January 1999 (aged 16)	(Cameroonian Football Federation) Avenir de Yaounde
16	GK	Gabin Donald Wandji Baba	2 August 1999 (aged 15)	(Cameroonian Football Federation) Galactique de Douala
17	DF	Jules Frederic Ngassa Njike	6 July 1999 (aged 15)	(Cameroonian Football Federation) Esperance Pour Tous Academie de Yaounde
18	DF	**Martin Hongla**	16 March 1998 (aged 16)	(Cameroonian Football Federation) Nkufor Academy Sport
19	DF	Thomas Manguele	21 May 1998 (aged 16)	(Cameroonian Football Federation) AS Stars de Yaounde
20	FW	Mbarga As Nephtali	18 October 1998 (aged 16)	(Cameroonian Football Federation) Acadeamie Roger Mill
21	GK	Assale Mathieu Augustin	21 January 2000 (aged 15)	(Cameroonian Football Federation) AS Estuaire de Douala

=== Ivory Coast ===
Head Coach: Soualiho Haidara

No.	Pos.	Player	Date of birth (age)	Club
1	GK	Mohamed Ouattara	27 December 1999 (aged 15)	(Ivorian Football Federation) Societe Omnisports de L'Armee
2	DF	Koffi Kouao	20 May 1998 (aged 16)	(Ivorian Football Federation) ASEC Mimosas
3	DF	Nategue Lassina Ouattara	23 December 1998 (aged 16)	(Ivorian Football Federation) Leader Foot Academy
4	DF	Aboubacar Kouyaté	3 November 1998 (aged 16)	(Ivorian Football Federation) Cub Omnisports de Bouafle
5	DF	Zié Ouattara	9 January 2000 (aged 15)	(Ivorian Football Federation) Copa F.C.
6	MF	Trazié Thomas	1 July 1999 (aged 15)	(Ivorian Football Federation) F.C. Nansiara
7	FW	N'Guessan Jonas Kouadio	22 February 1998 (aged 16)	(Ivorian Football Federation) Club Omnisports de Bouafle
8	MF	Idrissa Doumbia	14 April 1998 (aged 16)	(Royal Belgian Football Association) R.S.C. Anderlecht
9	MF	Loph Willy Gohore	10 October 2001 (aged 13)	(Ivorian Football Federation) Sirocco de San Pedro
10	FW	Baba Lamine Traore	16 June 1998 (aged 16)	(Ivorian Football Federation) Afad Djekanou
11	FW	Ange Dominique Konan	13 January 1998 (aged 17)	(Ivorian Football Federation) Club Omnisports de Bouafle
12	FW	Abdel Latif Bamba	17 January 1998 (aged 17)	(Ivorian Football Federation) Athletic Adjame
13	FW	Abdoul Karim Diaby	1 January 1999 (aged 16)	(Ivorian Football Federation) Union Africaine F.C.
14	MF	Kouassi Ouedraogo	8 March 1998 (aged 16)	(Ivorian Football Federation) SC Gagnoa
15	MF	Dro Narcisse Ble	30 May 1998 (aged 16)	(Ivorian Football Federation) Club Omnisports de Bouafle
16	GK	Moussa Baba Bamba	23 October 2001 (aged 13)	(Ivorian Football Federation) Stade F.C.
17	DF	Ange Fabrice Nimba	20 December 1998 (aged 16)	(Ivorian Football Federation) Zuenoula
18	MF	Jean Patrick Gnako	31 December 2000 (aged 14)	(Ivorian Football Federation) F.C. Osa
19	DF	Romaric Koné	15 December 1998 (aged 16)	(Nigerien Football Federation) Kandadji Sports
20	DF	Abdoul Yvann Diallo	11 May 1999 (aged 15)	(Ivorian Football Federation) Bouake F.C.
21	GK	Ange Mandanda Tanoh	24 December 1999 (aged 15)	(Ivorian Football Federation) ES Bingerville

=== Mali ===
Head Coach: Baye Ba

No.	Pos.	Player	Date of birth (age)	Club
1	GK	Samuel Diarra	11 August 1998 (aged 16)	(Malian Football Federation) ASKO
2	DF	**Abdoul Karim Danté**	29 October 1998 (aged 16)	(Malian Football Federation) Jeanne D'Arc de Bamako
3	MF	**Siaka Bagayoko**	4 July 1998 (aged 16)	(Malian Football Federation) Djoliba AC
4	DF	Dramane Simpara	5 May 1998 (aged 16)	(Malian Football Federation) Cs Duguwolofila
5	MF	Mamadou Sangaré	19 February 1998 (aged 16)	(Malian Football Federation) COB
6	DF	Ismaël Traoré	2 January 1998 (aged 17)	(Malian Football Federation) CSK
7	FW	Sidiki Maiga	28 December 1998 (aged 16)	(Malian Football Federation) AS Real de Bamako
8	DF	Moussa Diakité	17 December 1998 (aged 16)	(Malian Football Federation) ASKO
9	FW	Aly Mallé	3 April 1998 (aged 16)	(Malian Football Federation) Black Stars
10	FW	Mohamed Haidara	31 December 1998 (aged 16)	(Malian Football Federation) Djoliba AC
11	FW	Boubacar Traoré	24 May 1998 (aged 16)	(Malian Football Federation) Jeanne D'Arc de Bamako
12	FW	Sory Ibrahim Keita	5 February 1998 (aged 17)	(Malian Football Federation) F.C. Danaya
14	DF	Cheick Keita	23 November 1999 (aged 15)	(Malian Football Federation) Syba Kayes
15	DF	**Mamadou Fofana**	21 January 1998 (aged 17)	(Malian Football Federation) Stade Malien de Bamako
16	GK	Alou Traoré	23 January 1998 (aged 17)	(Malian Football Federation) Djoliba AC
17	FW	Yacouba Fomba	28 September 1998 (aged 16)	(Malian Football Federation) Djoliba AC
18	FW	Amara Bagayoko	20 December 1998 (aged 16)	(Malian Football Federation) Djoliba AC
19	MF	Ousmane Traoré	20 July 1998 (aged 16)	(Malian Football Federation) Afrik Foot
20	MF	**Sékou Koïta**	28 November 1999 (aged 15)	(Malian Football Federation) US Kita
21	GK	Drissa Kouyaté	17 December 1998 (aged 16)	(Malian Football Federation) AS Real Bamako

=== South Africa ===
Head Coach: Molefi Petrus Ntseki

No.	Pos.	Player	Date of birth (age)	Club
1	GK	Sanele Tshabalala	12 May 1998 (aged 16)	(South African Football Association) Bidvest Wits
2	DF	Simon Nqoi	28 June 1998 (aged 16)	(South African Football Association) Supersport
3	DF	Riyaaz Ismail	5 January 1998 (aged 17)	(South African Football Association) Hellenic F.C.
4	DF	**Katlego Mohamme**	10 March 1998 (aged 16)	(South African Football Association) Supersport
5	MF	**Athenkosi Dlala**	6 February 1998 (aged 17)	(South African Football Association) Supersport
6	DF	Notha Ngcobo	10 January 1999 (aged 16)	(South African Football Association) Sundowns Academy
7	MF	Vuyo Mantjie	22 June 1998 (aged 16)	(South African Football Association) Harmony Academy
8	MF	Sibongakonke Mbatha	1 January 1998 (aged 17)	(South African Football Association) School Of Excellence
9	FW	Luvuyo Mkatshana	20 April 1998 (aged 16)	(South African Football Association) Bidvest Wits
10	MF	Nelson Maluleke	1 April 1998 (aged 16)	(South African Football Association) Supersport
11	MF	Malebogo Modise	6 February 1999 (aged 16)	(South African Football Association) Sundowns Academy
12	MF	**Wiseman Meyiwa**	27 December 1999 (aged 15)	(South African Football Association) Chiefs Academy
13	DF	**Thendo Mukumela**	30 January 1998 (aged 17)	(South African Football Association) Sundowns Academy
14	MF	**Liam Jordan**	30 July 1998 (aged 16)	(South African Football Association) Bidvest Wits
15	DF	**Keanu Cupido**	15 January 1998 (aged 17)	(South African Football Association) Diambars
16	GK	**Mondli Mpoto**	24 July 1998 (aged 16)	(South African Football Association) Supersport
17	FW	**Khanyisa Mayo**	27 August 1998 (aged 16)	(South African Football Association) Supersport
18	FW	Edwin Sekhwama	2 January 1998 (aged 17)	(South African Football Association) School Of Excellence
19	MF	James Monyane	30 April 2000 (aged 14)	(South African Football Association) Augusto Palacious Academy
20	MF	**Reeve Frosler**	11 January 1998 (aged 17)	(South African Football Association) Bidvest Wits
21	GK	Mxolisi Sizwe Skei	3 February 1998 (aged 17)	(South African Football Association) Chiefs Academy
