= Football at the 2011 All-Africa Games – Men's team squads =

The following is a list of squads for each nation competing at All-Africa Games in Mozambique.

== Group A ==
=== Ghana ===
Head coach: (Ghana) Kwesi Appiah

No.	Pos.	Player	Date of birth (age)	Caps	Club
	GK	Joseph Addo			(Ghana) Heart of Lions
	GK	Daniel Agyei (captain)			(Ghana) Liberty Professionals
	GK	Collins Addo			(Ghana) New Edubiase United
	DF	Augustine Sefa			(Ghana) Medeama SC
	DF	Mohammed Sabato			(Ghana) Asante Kotoko
	DF	Edward Kpodo			(Ghana) Berekum Chelsea
	DF	Ahmed Adams			(Ghana) Berekum Chelsea
	DF	Rashid Sumaila			(Ghana) Ebusua Dwarfs
	DF	Lawrence Lartey			(Ghana) F.C. Nania
	MF	Malik Akowuah			(Ghana) Ashanti Gold SC
	MF	Mumuni Abubakar			(Ghana) New Edubiase United
	MF	Richard Mpong			(Ghana) Medeama SC
	MF	Francis Morton			(Ghana) Liberty Professionals
	MF	Sarfo Gyamfi			(Ghana) Wa All Stars
	MF	Alhaji Sanie			(Ghana) Ashanti Gold SC
	MF	Prince Baffoe			(Ghana) F.C. Nania
	MF	Uriah Asante			(Ghana) Pure Joy FC
	FW	Gilbert Fiamenyo			(Ghana) Heart of Lions
	FW	Mahatma Otoo			(Ghana) Hearts of Oak
	FW	Benjamin Acheampong			(Ghana) Asante Kotoko

=== Mozambique ===
Head coach:

=== South Africa ===
Head coach: (South Africa) Ephraim 'Shakes' Mashaba

No.	Pos.	Player	Date of birth (age)	Caps	Goals	Club
	GK	Brilliant Khuzwayo				(South African Football Association) AmaZulu
	GK	Boalefa Pule				(South African Football Association) Platinum Stars
	DF	Sibusiso Mxoyana				(South African Football Association) Orlando Pirates
	DF	Siyabonga Zulu				(South African Football Association) Blackburn Rovers
	DF	Enrico Adolph				(South African Football Association) Wits University
	DF	Buhle Mkhwanazi	1 February 1990 (age 36)			(South African Football Association) Mamelodi Sundowns
	DF	Katlego Pule				(South African Football Association) Wits University
	DF	Sibusiso Khumalo				(South African Football Association) Mamelodi Sundowns
	MF	Thamsanqa Sangweni				(South African Football Association) AmaZulu
	MF	Khunadi Nkoana				(South African Football Association) Chippa United
	MF	Lehlogonolo Masalesa				(South African Football Association) Wits University
	MF	Themba Zwane				(South African Football Association) Mamelodi Sundowns
	MF	Jabulani Shongwe	28 February 1989 (age 37)			(South African Football Association) Mamelodi Sundowns
	MF	Thabang Motau				(South African Football Association) Mpumalanga Black Aces
	FW	Fisimpilo Ntombela	April 29, 1989 (aged 21)			(South African Football Association) Black Spurs
	FW	Phumelele Bhengu				Unattached
	FW	Riaan Eugene				(South African Football Association) Santos

== Group B ==
=== Cameroon ===
Head coach:

No.	Pos.	Player	Date of birth (age)	Caps	Club
	GK	Jean Efala	11 August 1992 (age 33)		(Cameroon) Fovu Baham
		Mouchili Mfomban			(Cameroon) APEJES de Mfou
	GK	Fernand Ngarwa			(Cameroon) Renaissance de Ngoumou
	DF	Jacques Bertin Nguemaleu	2 September 1989 (age 36)		(Cameroon) Union Douala
		Ibrahim Walidjo	2 April 1989 (age 37)		(Cameroon) Renaissance de Ngoumou
		Azongha Tembeng	13 September 1991 (age 34)		(Cameroon) Aigle Royal Menoua
		Willy Namedji			(Cameroon) Fovu Baham
		Franck Kom			(Cameroon) Panthère du Ndé
		Justin Mengolo			(Cameroon) Panthère du Ndé
		Alex Ngamou			(Cameroon) Unisport FC du Haut-Nkam
		Yazid Atouba			(Cameroon) Canon Yaoundé
		Roland Ndzana Mvogo			(Cameroon) Cosmos de Bafia
		Camille Kamdem Kamdem			(Cameroon) Renaissance FC de Ngoumou
	FW	Léandre Tawamba	20 December 1989 (age 36)		(Cameroon) Aigle Royal Menoua
		Brillant Mformi			(Cameroon) Astres FC
		Charles Lobe Lembe			(Cameroon) Unisport FC de Douala
		François Awona			(Cameroon) Achille FC de Sa’a
		Prince Harold Nyam			(Cameroon) Tonnerre Yaoundé
		Maurice Ohandja			(Cameroon) Cosmos de Bafia
	DF	Clovis Kamdjo	15 December 1990 (age 35)		(England) Barnet F.C.
		Fabrice Balogog Loe	6 July 1990 (age 36)		(Cameroon) Canon Yaoundé
		Roméo Yem Yem			(Cameroon) Astres FC
		Bertin Guefigue			(Cameroon) Hope FC
		Pierre Daniel Nguini			(Cameroon) International FC Nekom
		Brian Nsang			(Brazil) Cruzeiro

=== Senegal ===
Head coach:

FRED TAMALE '
