= Nagoli =

Nagoli is a surname. Notable people with the surname include:

- Kennedy Nagoli (born 1973), Zimbabwean footballer
- Maxime Nagoli (born 2000), Ivorian footballer
