= Habib Mohamed =

Habib Mohamed or Mohammed may refer to:

- Habib Mohamed (footballer, born 1983)
- Habib Mohammed (footballer, born 1997)
