= Abdul-Aziz Nurudeen =

Ghanaian professional footballer

Abdul-Aziz Nurudeen (born 11 September 1998) is a Ghanaian professional footballer who plays as a midfielder for Ghanaian Premier league side Accra Hearts of Oak.

== Club career ==
=== Early career ===
Nurudeen started his career with Ajax Academy previously located at Legon. He was teammates with Joseph Esso. He later moved to Ghana Division One League side Vision FC.

=== Hearts of Oak ===
In January 2020, he signed for Accra Hearts of Oak ahead of the 2019–20 Ghana Premier League season. He made his debut on 15 January 2020 in goalless draw against West African Football Academy, he came on in 74th minute for Kofi Kordzi. He was limited to 4 league matches before the league was cancelled due to the COVID-19 pandemic. He was named on the team's squad list for the 2020–21 Ghana Premier League season.

== International career ==
Nurudeen was a member of the Ghana national under-23 football team in 2019. In November 2019, he was selected to be part of the Ghana national under-23 football team ahead of the 2019 Africa U-23 Cup of Nations in Egypt. He featured in two matches during the tournament.

== Honours ==
Hearts of Oak

- Ghana Premier League: 2020–21
- Ghanaian FA Cup: 2021
