= Football at the 2011 All-Africa Games – Men's tournament =

2011 Men's All-Africa Games football tournament
Tournament details
- Host country: Mozambique
- City: Maputo
- Dates: 4–17 September
- Teams: 8 (from 1 confederation)
- Venue: 1 (in 1 host city)

Final positions
- Champions: Ghana (1st title)
- Runners-up: South Africa
- Third place: Cameroon
- Fourth place: Senegal

Tournament statistics
- Matches played: 10
- Goals scored: 21 (2.1 per match)
- Top scorer(s): (Ghana) Osumanu Otoo (4 goals)

The 2011 All-Africa Games football – Men's tournament was the 10th edition of the African Games men's football tournament for men. The football tournament was held in Maputo, Mozambique between 4–17 September 2011 as part of the 2011 All-Africa Games. The tournament was age-restricted and open to men's under-23 national teams.

== Qualified teams ==
Zone	Qualifiers
Host	Mozambique
Zone 1	Egypt^{1}
Zone 2	Senegal
Zone 3	Ghana
Zone 4	Cameroon
Zone 5	Uganda
Zone 6	South Africa
Zone 7	Madagascar^{2}

Notes

- Note 1: Initially replaced by Libya, but also it has withdrawn.
- Note 2: Withdrew.

== Final tournament ==
The draw for the men's final tournament took place in Cairo, Egypt on July 12 in CAF headquarters. The six teams were divided into two groups of three teams. The two top teams from each group played the semifinals before the final match.

Group winners and runners-up will advanced to semifinals.

All times given as local time (UTC+2)

=== Group stage ===
Legend
Teams that advanced to the semifinals

==== Group A ====
Team	Pld	W	D	L	GF	GA	GD	Pts
South Africa	2	2	0	0	4	1	+3	6
Ghana	2	1	0	1	4	4	0	3
Mozambique	2	0	0	2	4	7	−3	0

4 September 2011

Mozambique	1–3	South Africa
Fait 5'	Report	Khumalo 25'; Sangweni 47'; Motau 60'

Estádio do Zimpeto, Maputo

7 September 2011

South Africa	1–0	Ghana
Ntombela 79'	Report

Estádio do Maxaquene, Maputo

10 September 2011

Mozambique	3–4	Ghana
Uetimane 62'; Maninho; Tomocene	Report	Otoo 8', 15', 25'; Fiamenyo 63'

Estádio da Machava, Maputo

==== Group B ====
Team	Pld	W	D	L	GF	GA	GD	Pts
Cameroon	2	1	1	0	1	0	1	4
Senegal	2	1	0	1	2	1	+1	3
Uganda	2	0	1	1	1	2	−1	1

5 September 2011

Cameroon	0–0	Uganda
	Report

Estádio do Maxaquene, Maputo
Referee: Jose Rachide

8 September 2011

Uganda	1–2	Senegal
Juma 80' (pen.)	Report	Coly 30'; Diop 56'

Estádio do Maxaquene, Maputo

11 September 2011

Cameroon	1–0	Senegal
Nguemaleu 19'	Report

Estádio do Maxaquene, Maputo

=== Knockout stage ===
Semi-finals
13 September – Maputo
South Africa	0 (6)
Senegal	0 (5)
14 September – Maputo
Cameroon	0
Ghana	1

Final
17 September – Maputo
South Africa	1 (2)
Ghana	1 (4)
Third place
16 September – Maputo
Senegal	1 (4)
Cameroon	1 (5)

==== Semifinals ====
13 September 2011

South Africa	0–0 (a.e.t.)	Senegal
	Report
Penalties
	6–5

Estádio do Maxaquene, Maputo

14 September 2011

Cameroon	0–1	Ghana
	Report	Baffoe 51'

Estádio do Maxaquene, Maputo

==== Bronze Medal match ====
16 September 2011
15:30

Senegal	1–1 (a.e.t.)	Cameroon
Gomis	Report	Djika
Penalties
	4–5

Estádio do Maxaquene, Maputo

==== Gold Medal match ====
17 September 2011
18:30

South Africa	1–1 (a.e.t.)	Ghana
Eugene 86'	Report	Otoo 90' (pen.)
Penalties
	2–4

Estádio do Zimpeto, Maputo

== Final ranking ==
Pos	Team	Pld	W	D	L	GF	GA	GD	Pts	Final result
1st place, gold medalist(s)	Ghana	4	2	1	1	6	5	+1	7	Gold Medal
2nd place, silver medalist(s)	South Africa	4	2	2	0	5	2	+3	8	Silver Medal
3rd place, bronze medalist(s)	Cameroon	4	1	2	1	2	2	0	5	Bronze Medal
4	Senegal	4	1	2	1	3	3	0	5	Fourth place
5	Uganda	2	0	1	1	1	2	−1	1	Eliminated in group stage
6	Mozambique (H)	2	0	0	2	4	7	−3	0	Eliminated in group stage

Source: todor66
(H) Hosts

== Goalscorers ==
4 goal

- (Ghana) Mahatma Otoo

1 goal

- (Cameroon) Douglas Djika
- (Cameroon) Jacques Nguemaleu
- (Ghana) Prince Baffoe
- (Ghana) Gilbert Fiamenyo
- (Mozambique) Artur Fait
- (Mozambique) Maninho
- (Mozambique) Jonas Tomocene
- (Mozambique) Manuel Uetimane
- (Senegal) Aliou Coly
- (Senegal) Dame Diop
- (Senegal) Emmanuel Gomis
- (South Africa) Riaan Eugene
- (South Africa) Sibusiso Khumalo
- (South Africa) Thamsanqa Sangweni
- (South Africa) Thabang Motau
- (South Africa) Fisimpilo Ntombela
- (Uganda) Ibrahim Juma

== See also ==
- Football at the 2011 All-Africa Games – Women's tournament
