= Pierre Fonkeu =

Cameroonian footballer

Personal information
- Full name: Pierre Xavier Fonkeu
- Date of birth: 10 July 1997 (age 29)
- Place of birth: Belgium
- Position: Forward

Team information
- Current team: Maidstone United

Youth career
- –2017: Club Brugge
- 2017–2019: Norwich City

Senior career*
Years	Team	Apps	(Gls)
2019–2020	Lens II	1	(0)
2020	Beroe	3	(0)
2021	Weymouth	15	(0)
2022	Hemel Hempstead Town	11	(2)
2022–2023	Dartford	43	(10)
2023–2024	Oxford City	16	(3)
2024	→ Hemel Hempstead Town (loan)	5	(1)
2024–	Maidstone United	12	(0)
- * Club domestic league appearances and goals as of 17:10, 18 November 2024 (UTC)

Pierre Xavier Fonkeu (born 10 July 1997) is a Cameroonian footballer who plays as a forward for Maidstone United.

== Early life ==
Fonkeu was born in Belgium.

== Club career ==
Having come through the youth ranks at Club Brugge, Fonkeu joined Norwich City on a two-year contract on 31 August 2017 following a trial period with the club. He was released by the club in summer 2019 following the expiry of his contract.

On 27 June 2019, it was announced that Fonkeu had signed for RC Lens, initially joining their reserve team in the Championnat National 2. However, he played just once for their reserve side and joined Bulgarian First League club Beroe in February 2020. He played 3 times for Beroe but was released at the end of the season.

Following a trial spell at Grimsby Town, Fonkeu was offered a short-term deal with the Mariners, however this was held up due to delays in obtaining international clearance, and fell through after the departure of manager Ian Holloway. Fonkeu signed for National League club Weymouth on a permanent deal on 30 January 2021. He made his debut for Weymouth as a substitute in a 1–0 home defeat to Notts County later that day. He made 15 appearances for Weymouth during the 2020–21 season. He was released by the club at the end of the season following the expiry of his contract.

On 25 February 2022, Fonkeu joined National League South side Hemel Hempstead Town. He made 11 appearances and scored twice during the 2021–22 season.

On 1 August 2022, Fonkeu joined Dartford ahead of the 2022–23 season.

On 14 July 2023, Fonkeu signed for Oxford City.

On 12 March 2024, Fonkeu joined Hemel Hempstead Town on loan.

In June 2024, Fonkeu joined National League South side Maidstone United.

== International career ==
He has represented Cameroon at under-23 level and was part of their squad for the 2019 Africa U-23 Cup of Nations, where he was an unused substitute in all three matches.

== Career statistics ==
As of match played 16 November 2024

Appearances and goals by club, season and competition
Club	Season	League			National Cup		League Cup		Other		Total	
Club	Season	Division	Apps	Goals	Apps	Goals	Apps	Goals	Apps	Goals	Apps	Goals
Lens II	2019–20	Championnat National 2	1	0	—		—		0	0	1	0
Beroe	2019–20	Bulgarian First League	3	0	0	0	—		0	0	3	0
Weymouth	2020–21	National League	15	0	0	0	—		0	0	15	0
Hemel Hempstead Town	2021–22	National League South	11	2	0	0	—		0	0	11	2
Dartford	2022–23	National League South	43	10	1	0	—		6 (Note: Three appearances and one goal in the London Senior Cup) (Note: One appearance in the FA Trophy) (Note: One appearance in the Kent Senior Cup) (Note: One appearance in the National League South Play-Offs)	1	50	11
Oxford City	2023–24	National League	16	3	2	0	—		0	0	18	3
Hemel Hempstead Town (loan)	2023–24	National League South	5	1	—		—		—		5	1
Maidstone United	2024–25	National League South	12	0	2	0	—		1	0	15	0
Career total			106	16	5	0	0	0	7	1	118	17
