= Accra City Stars F.C. =

Accra City Stars
- Full name: Accra City Stars Football Club
- Nickname: The Eagles
- Founded: Unknown
- Ground: Teshie Mats Park, Greater Accra, Ghana
- Chairman: Fred Crentsil
- Manager: Fadi Omari
- League: Poly Tank Division One League
Away colours

Accra City Stars are a Ghanaian professional football club, based in Indadfa, Greater Accra. The club is currently competing in the Ghana Poly Tank Division One League.

== History ==
=== St. Mirren FC ===
St. Mirren FC were promoted to the Premier League in October 2008, after qualifying on top of Zone III in the middle league, beating Royal Knights F.C., Fairpoint F.C., and drawing with Power FC.

The club played in the Ghana Premier League in the 2008–09 season. Mahatma Otoo was the club's best player after he earned the Discovery Player of the season award in the 2008–09 season after he won five man of the match awards and got 5 goals from 15 games for his club. They were relegated at the end of the season.

=== Accra City Stars FC (2018–present) ===
In late 2017, the club started working on rebranding their club to reflect both the Ghanaian culture and help them grow their fan base. The name of the club was changed to Accra City Stars FC. since the club was based in the regional capital of Ghana. The change of name took effect on 10 January 2018.

== Notable players ==
- See Category:Accra City Stars F.C. players
