= Thabo Mngomeni =

South African soccer player

Personal information
- Date of birth: 24 June 1969 (age 57)
- Place of birth: Langa, Cape Town
- Position: Midfielder

Youth career
- Bafana
- Umtata City
- Tembu Royals

Senior career*
Years	Team	Apps	(Gls)
1990–1994	Cape Town Spurs	67	(9)
1993	→ D'Alberton Callies (loan)	3	(0)
1994	→ Manning Rangers (loan)	25	(1)
1994–1998	Umtata Bush Bucks	95	(9)
1998–2002	Orlando Pirates	86	(23)
2002	Hellenic		

International career
1998–2002	South Africa	37	(6)
- * Club domestic league appearances and goals

Thabo Mngomeni (born 24 June 1969, Cape Town, Western Cape) is a South African former Association football midfielder.

After starting his professional career at Cape Town Spurs and having a brief spell at Manning Rangers, Mngomeni became a household name in South Africa playing for Bush Bucks and Orlando Pirates. He also had a brief spell at Hellenic before retirement.

He played for South Africa national soccer team and was a participant at the 2002 FIFA World Cup.

== Cape Town Spurs ==
He was recruited by former Kaizer Chiefs, Cape Town Spurs and Hellenic player, Sergio Dos Santos from an Eastern Cape amateur team, Tembu Royals. He left Spurs after two loan deals claiming that his coach, Mich D'Avray "hated him with a passion and he didn't know why".

== Umtata Bush Bucks ==
He first heard of the doping test in 1996 when he was informed by club officials who were aware that he smoked marijuana. Since Mngomeni was a Rastafarian he only smoked marijuana during pre-season.

== Orlando Pirates ==
Mngomeni would play for Orlando Pirates between 1998 and 2002 and become the club captain, leading them to the league title in 2001. It was during this period that he also became a regular at national level, and was one of very few locally based players in the South Africa squad during that period.

== International career ==
He made his debut for the national football side at 29 in a 1–0 victory over Angola in 1998. All in all he played for the national team on 38 occasions, scoring six goals. He won the 2001 CAF Goal of the Year, for his bicycle kick against Congo.

== Retirement ==
After joining Hellenic his career came to an end and he retired because of a knee injury at the age of 33.

== After retirement ==
He has coached at a number of Vodacom League teams in Cape Town. He completed his SAFA Level 2 coaching course. In 2022, he launched the Thabo Mngomeni Foundation, and has been coaching in the rural areas of the Eastern Cape province.

== Personal life ==
He is the older brother of Thando Mngomeni. He is married and has five daughters. He lives in Eerste River in Cape Town

== Career statistics ==
=== International goals ===
#	Date	Venue	Opponent	Score	Result	Competition
1.	5 June 1999	Kings Park Stadium, Durban, South Africa	Mauritius	2–0	Win	2000 African Cup of Nations qual.
2.	28 May 2000	Ta' Qali National Stadium, Ta' Qali, Malta	Malta	0–1	Win	Friendly
3.	7 June 2000	Cotton Bowl, Dallas, Texas, United States	Mexico	4–2	Loss	2000 U.S. Cup
4.	3 September 2000	Stade Municipal, Pointe Noire, Republic of the Congo	Congo	1–2	Win	2002 African Cup of Nations qual.
5.	30 January 2002	Stade Amare Daou, Ségou, Mali	Morocco	3–1	Win	2002 African Cup of Nations
6.	12 May 2002	Kings Park Stadium, Durban, South Africa	Madagascar	1–0	Win	Friendly
Correct as of 9 March 2017

== See also ==
- List of African association football families
