= 2019 U-23 Africa Cup of Nations =

Third edition of the Africa U-23 Cup of Nations

2019 Africa U-23 Cup of Nations
كأس الأمم الأفريقية تحت 23 سنة 2019

Tournament details
- Host country: Egypt
- Dates: 8–22 November
- Teams: 8 (from 1 confederation)
- Venues: 2 (in 1 host city)

Final positions
- Champions: Egypt (1st title)
- Runners-up: Ivory Coast
- Third place: South Africa
- Fourth place: Ghana

Tournament statistics
- Matches played: 16
- Goals scored: 35 (2.19 per match)
- Top scorer(s): (Egypt) Mostafa Mohamed (4 goals)
- Best player: (Egypt) Ramadan Sobhi
- Best goalkeeper: (Egypt) Mohamed Sobhy
- Fair play award: Egypt

The 2019 Africa U-23 Cup of Nations was the third edition of the Africa U-23 Cup of Nations, the quadrennial international age-restricted football championship organised by the Confederation of African Football (CAF) for the men's under-23 national teams of Africa. It was hosted by Egypt between 8 and 22 November 2019.

The tournament was initially scheduled to take place in Zambia, but they withdrew from hosting in July 2017. Egypt was announced as the new host nation of the tournament by CAF on 23 September 2017.

Same as previous editions, the tournament served as African qualifying for the Olympic football tournament, with the top three teams of the tournament qualifying for the 2020 Summer Olympic men's football tournament in Japan.

Nigeria were the defending champions, but were eliminated in the group stage. Egypt defeated Ivory Coast 2–1 at extra time in the final, winning the title for the first time in their history, while South Africa came third for the second times in a row after beating Ghana 6–5 on penalties after the match ended 2–2 in their third-place play-off match.

== Qualification ==
Egypt qualified automatically as hosts, while the remaining seven spots were determined by the qualifying rounds.

=== Qualified teams ===
The following eight teams qualified for the final tournament.

| Team | Appearance | Previous best performance |
|---|---|---|
| Egypt (hosts) | 3rd | Third place (2011) |
| Cameroon | 1st | Debut |
| Ghana | 1st | Debut |
| Ivory Coast | 2nd | Group stage (2011) |
| Mali | 2nd | Group stage (2015) |
| Nigeria | 3rd | Champions (2015) |
| South Africa | 3rd | Third place (2015) |
| Zambia | 2nd | Group stage (2015) |

== Venues ==
The tournament used two venues, Cairo International Stadium and Al Salam Stadium, both in Cairo.

| 2019 U-23 Africa Cup of Nations is located in Egypt | Cairo | |
|---|---|---|
| 2019 U-23 Africa Cup of Nations is located in Egypt | Cairo International Stadium | Al Salam Stadium |
| 2019 U-23 Africa Cup of Nations is located in Egypt | Capacity: 75,000 | Capacity: 30,000 |

== Squads ==
Each team had to register a squad of 21 players. Only players born on or after 1 January 1997 were eligible to compete in the tournament (Regulations Article 45).

== Draw ==
The draw of the final tournament was held on 2 October 2019, 19:00 CAT (UTC+2), at the Haramlek Palace of Montaza Complex in Alexandria. The eight teams were drawn into two groups of four teams. The hosts Egypt were seeded in Group A (position A1), and the defending champions Nigeria were seeded in Group B (position B1). The remaining teams were allocated to two pots based on the results of the 2015 Africa U-23 Cup of Nations, and were drawn to the remaining positions in their group.

| Seeds | Pot 1 | Pot 2 |
|---|---|---|
| Egypt (position A1); Nigeria (position B1) | South Africa; Mali | Zambia; Ghana; Ivory Coast; Cameroon |

== Match officials ==
On 31 October 2019, CAF released the list of 12 referees and 13 assistant referees selected to oversee matches. This is the first time CAF appointed female match officials for the tournament.

| Regional Federation | Referees | Assistant Referees |
|---|---|---|
| UNAF | (Algeria) Lahlou Benbraham (Egypt) Mohamed Maarouf (Tunisia) Slim Belkhouas | (Egypt) Youssef El Bosaty (Morocco) Fathia Jermoumi (Tunisia) Khalil Hassani |
| WAFU-UFOA | (Benin) Louis Houngnandande (Mali) Boubou Traoré (Senegal) Daouda Guèye | (Burkina Faso) Judicael Sanou (The Gambia) Abdul Aziz Bollel Jawo (Guinea-Bissau) Firmino Bassafim (Niger) Abdoul Aziz Moctar Saley (Nigeria) Samuel Pwadutakam |
| UNIFFAC | (Gabon) Pierre Atcho | (São Tomé and Príncipe) Abelmiro dos Reis |
| CECAFA | (Burundi) Georges Gatogato (Djibouti) Souleiman Ahmed Djama (Rwanda) Salima Mukansanga | (Uganda) Dick Okello |
| COSAFA | (Comoros) Ali Mohamed Adelaide (Madagascar) Andofetra Rakotojaona | (Angola) Ivanildo Meirelles Lopes (Seychelles) James Emile (Zambia) Diana Chikotesha |

== Group stage ==
The top two teams of each group advanced to the semi-finals.

Tiebreakers

Teams were ranked according to points (3 points for a win, 1 point for a draw, 0 points for a loss), and if tied on points, the following tiebreaking criteria were applied in the order given, to determine the rankings (Regulations Article 68):

1. Points in head-to-head matches among tied teams;
2. Goal difference in head-to-head matches among tied teams;
3. Goals scored in head-to-head matches among tied teams;
4. If more than two teams are tied and after applying all head-to-head criteria above, a subset of teams are still tied, all head-to-head criteria above are reapplied exclusively to this subset of teams;
5. Goal difference in all group matches;
6. Goals scored in all group matches;
7. Drawing of lots.

All times are local, CAT (UTC+2).

=== Group A ===
| Pos | Team | Pld | W | D | L | GF | GA | GD | Pts | Qualification |
|---|---|---|---|---|---|---|---|---|---|---|
| 1 | Egypt (H) | 3 | 3 | 0 | 0 | 6 | 3 | +3 | 9 | Advance to knockout stage |
| 2 | Ghana | 3 | 1 | 1 | 1 | 5 | 4 | +1 | 4 | Advance to knockout stage |
| 3 | Cameroon | 3 | 1 | 1 | 1 | 3 | 3 | 0 | 4 | |
| 4 | Mali | 3 | 0 | 0 | 3 | 0 | 4 | −4 | 0 | |

Source: CAF
Rules for classification: Group stage tiebreakers
(H) Hosts
8 November 2019
19:00

| Egypt | 1–0 | Mali |
|---|---|---|
| Mostafa 29' | Report (Soccerway) |

Cairo International Stadium, Cairo
Referee: Georges Gatogato (Burundi)
8 November 2019
22:00

| Cameroon | 1–1 | Ghana |
|---|---|---|
| Evina 59' | Report (Soccerway) | Mohammed 87' |

Cairo International Stadium, Cairo
Referee: Lahlou Benbraham (Algeria)

11 November 2019
17:00

| Mali | 0–1 | Cameroon |
|---|---|---|
| | Report (Soccerway) | Evina 76' |

Cairo International Stadium, Cairo
Referee: Ali Mohamed Adelaide (Comoros)
11 November 2019
20:00

| Ghana | 2–3 | Egypt |
|---|---|---|
| Yeboah 6'; Obeng 46' | Report (Soccerway) | Mostafa 17'; R. Sobhi 82'; Rayyan 88' |

Cairo International Stadium, Cairo
Referee: Daouda Guèye (Senegal)

14 November 2019
20:00

| Egypt | 2–1 | Cameroon |
|---|---|---|
| Mostafa 27', 50' | Report (Soccerway) | Ayuk 37' |

Cairo International Stadium, Cairo
Referee: Andofetra Rakotojaona (Madagascar)
14 November 2019
20:00

| Mali | 0–2 | Ghana |
|---|---|---|
| | Report (Soccerway) | Kwabena 74', 85' |

Al Salam Stadium, Cairo
Referee: Pierre Atcho (Gabon)

=== Group B ===
| Pos | Team | Pld | W | D | L | GF | GA | GD | Pts | Qualification |
|---|---|---|---|---|---|---|---|---|---|---|
| 1 | Ivory Coast | 3 | 2 | 0 | 1 | 2 | 1 | +1 | 6 | Advance to knockout stage |
| 2 | South Africa | 3 | 1 | 2 | 0 | 1 | 0 | +1 | 5 | Advance to knockout stage |
| 3 | Nigeria | 3 | 1 | 1 | 1 | 3 | 2 | +1 | 4 | |
| 4 | Zambia | 3 | 0 | 1 | 2 | 1 | 4 | −3 | 1 | |

Source: CAF
Rules for classification: Group stage tiebreakers
9 November 2019
17:00

| Nigeria | 0–1 | Ivory Coast |
|---|---|---|
| | Report (Soccerway) | Gnaka 71' (pen.) |

Al Salam Stadium, Cairo
Referee: Mohamed Maarouf (Egypt)
9 November 2019
20:00

| South Africa | 0–0 | Zambia |
|---|---|---|
| | Report (Soccerway) |

Al Salam Stadium, Cairo
Referee: Salima Mukansanga (Rwanda)

12 November 2019
17:00

| Ivory Coast | 0–1 | South Africa |
|---|---|---|
| | Report (Soccerway) | Mokoena 79' |

Al Salam Stadium, Cairo
Referee: Souleiman Ahmed Djama (Djibouti)
12 November 2019
20:00

| Zambia | 1–3 | Nigeria |
|---|---|---|
| Daka 12' | Report (Soccerway) | Okwonkwo 16'; Nwakali 65'; Awoniyi 90+3' |

Al Salam Stadium, Cairo
Referee: Slim Belkhouas (Tunisia)

15 November 2019
20:00

| Nigeria | 0–0 | South Africa |
|---|---|---|
| | Report (Soccerway) |

Al Salam Stadium, Cairo
Referee: Boubou Traoré (Mali)
15 November 2019
20:00

| Ivory Coast | 1–0 | Zambia |
|---|---|---|
| Dabila 61' | Report (Soccerway) |

Cairo International Stadium, Cairo
Referee: Louis Houngnandande (Benin)

== Knockout stage ==
In the knockout stage, extra time and penalty shoot-out were used to decide the winner if necessary, except for the third place match where a direct penalty shoot-out, without extra time, would be used to decide the winner if necessary.

=== Bracket ===
Semi-finals
19 November – Cairo International
Egypt | 3
South Africa | 0
19 November – Cairo International
Ivory Coast (p) | 2 (3)
Ghana | 2 (2)

Final
22 November – Cairo International
Egypt (a.e.t.) | 2
Ivory Coast | 1
Third place match
22 November – Cairo International
South Africa (p) | 2 (6)
Ghana | 2 (5)

=== Semi-finals ===
Winners qualified for the 2020 Summer Olympics.

19 November 2019
16:00

| Ivory Coast | 2–2 (a.e.t.) | Ghana |
|---|---|---|
| Dao 13', 85' | Report (Soccerway) | Yeboah 51'; Mensah 90+2' |
Penalties
| Diallo (penalty scored); Keita (penalty missed); H. Traorè (penalty scored); Kouao (penalty scored) | 3–2 | (penalty scored) Lomotey; (penalty missed) Cudjoe; (penalty missed) Mensah; (penalty scored) Obeng; (penalty missed) Kwabena |

Cairo International Stadium, Cairo
Referee: Lahlou Benbraham (Algeria)

19 November 2019
20:00

| Egypt | 3–0 | South Africa |
|---|---|---|
| R. Sobhi 59' (pen.); Magdy 84', 89' | Report (Soccerway) |

Cairo International Stadium, Cairo
Referee: Daouda Guèye (Senegal)

=== Third place match ===
Winners qualified for the 2020 Summer Olympics.

22 November 2019
16:00

| South Africa | 2–2 | Ghana |
|---|---|---|
| Mohammed 15' (o.g.); Mahlatsi 62' | Report (Soccerway) | Mensah 50'; Obeng 85' |
Penalties
| Malepe (penalty missed); Margeman (penalty scored); Mukumela (penalty scored); Singh (penalty scored); Dlala (penalty scored); Mohamme (penalty missed); Kodisang (penalty scored); Foster (penalty scored) | 6–5 | (penalty scored) Lomotey; (penalty scored) Mensah; (penalty scored) Issah; (penalty missed) Fobi; (penalty scored) Obeng; (penalty missed) Sarpong; (penalty scored) Fuseini; (penalty missed) Cudjoe |

Cairo International Stadium, Cairo
Referee: Boubou Traoré (Mali)

=== Final ===
22 November 2019
20:00

| Egypt | 2–1 (a.e.t.) | Ivory Coast |
|---|---|---|
| El Eraki 37'; R. Sobhi 114' | Report (Soccerway) | Doumbia 89' |

Cairo International Stadium, Cairo
Referee: Andofetra Rakotojaona (Madagascar)

== Winners ==
2019 Africa U-23 Cup of Nations champions

Egypt
First title

== Awards ==
The following awards were given at the conclusion of the tournament:

| Top Scorer | Best Player | Best Goalkeeper | Fair Play Award |
|---|---|---|---|
| (Egypt) Mostafa Mohamed (4 goals) | (Egypt) Ramadan Sobhi | (Egypt) Mohamed Sobhy | Egypt |

=== Team of the tournament ===
The team of the tournament was announced by the CAF after the final.

Coach: (Egypt) Shawky Gharieb

| Goalkeeper | Defenders | Midfielders | Forwards |
|---|---|---|---|
| (Egypt) Mohamed Sobhy | (South Africa) Tercious Malepe (Ivory Coast) Kouadio-Yves Dabila (Egypt) Ahmed Ramadan (Ivory Coast) Silas Gnaka | (Ivory Coast) Aboubakar Keita (Egypt) Amar Hamdy (Ghana) Evans Mensah | (Egypt) Ramadan Sobhi (Egypt) Mostafa Mohamed (Ivory Coast) Youssouf Dao |

== Qualified teams for Summer Olympics ==
The following three teams from CAF qualified for the 2020 Summer Olympic men's football tournament.

| Team | Qualified on | Previous appearances in Summer Olympics^{1} |
|---|---|---|
| Ivory Coast | 19 November 2019 | 1 (2008) |
| Egypt | 19 November 2019 | 11 (1920, 1924, 1928, 1936, 1948, 1952, 1960, 1964, 1984, 1992, 2012) |
| South Africa | 22 November 2019 | 2 (2000, 2016) |

^{1} Bold indicates champions for that year.

== Goalscorers ==
There were 35 goals scored in 16 matches, for an average of 2.19 goals per match.

4 goals

- (Egypt) Mostafa Mohamed

3 goals

- (Egypt) Ramadan Sobhi

2 goals

- (Cameroon) Franck Evina
- (Egypt) Abdel Rahman Magdy
- (Ghana) Owusu Kwabena
- (Ghana) Evans Mensah
- (Ghana) Samuel Obeng
- (Ghana) Yaw Yeboah
- (Ivory Coast) Youssouf Dao

1 goal

- (Cameroon) Eric Ayuk
- (Egypt) Karim El Eraky
- (Egypt) Ahmed Yasser Rayyan
- (Ghana) Habib Mohammed
- (Ivory Coast) Kouadio-Yves Dabila
- (Ivory Coast) Aboubacar Doumbia
- (Ivory Coast) Silas Gnaka
- (Nigeria) Taiwo Awoniyi
- (Nigeria) Kelechi Nwakali
- (Nigeria) Orji Okwonkwo
- (South Africa) Kamohelo Mahlatsi
- (South Africa) Teboho Mokoena
- (Zambia) Patson Daka

1 own goal

- (Ghana) Habib Mohammed (against South Africa)
