= Mahatma Otoo =

Ghanaian footballer

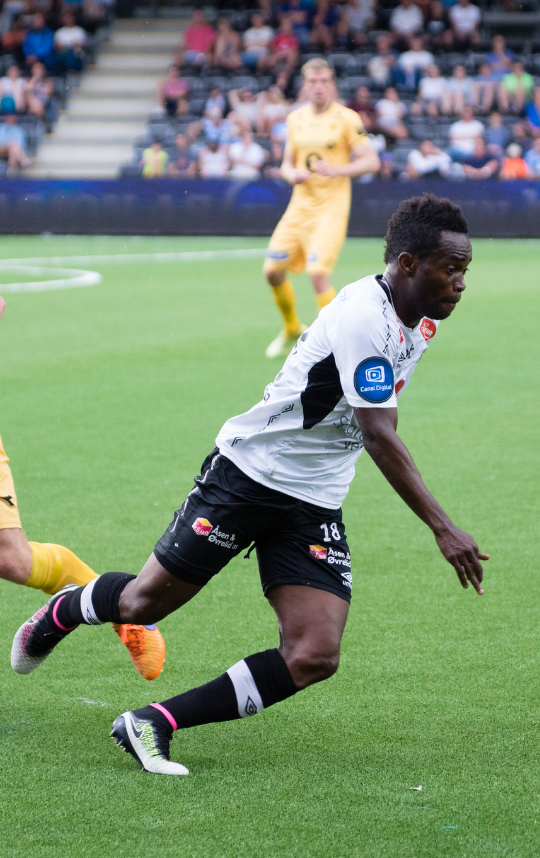
- Otoo playing for Sogndal

Personal information
- Full name: Mahatma Osumanu Otoo
- Date of birth: 6 February 1992 (age 34)
- Place of birth: Accra, Greater Accra, Ghana
- Height: 1.80 m (5 ft 11 in)
- Position: Striker

Youth career
- Sporting St. Mirren

Senior career*
Years	Team	Apps	(Gls)
2008–2009	Sporting St. Mirren	50	(27)
2009–2013	Hearts of Oak		
2010	→ ES Tunis (loan)	1	(0)
2013–2017	Sogndal	83	(26)
2017	Ümraniyespor	16	(1)
2017–2022	Balıkesirspor	132	(21)

International career^{‡}
	Ghana U-17	12	(5)
2011	Ghana U-20	10	(4)
2011	Ghana U-23	19	(12)
2009–	Ghana	4	(0)
- * Club domestic league appearances and goals as of 20 May 2022 ‡ National team caps and goals as of 15 October 2013

Mahatma Osumanu Otoo (born 6 February 1992) is a Ghanaian professional footballer who plays as a forward. He was the 2012–13 Ghana Premier League top scorer with 20 goals. Otoo played for Sogndal from 2013 to 2017, scoring 31 goals in 93 appearances in all competitions. He won the 1.divisjon in 2015 whilst playing with the Norwegian side.

== Early life ==
Otoo was born on 6 February 1992 in Mamprobi, a suburb of Ghana's capital Accra. He started playing juvenile football at the age of 10 for Ken Harrison Babes. He attended Ebenezer Secondary School located in Mamprobi for his secondary school education whilst playing for the school's football team.

== Career ==
=== St. Mirren ===
Otoo began his career in the youth side for Sporting St. Mirren at the age of 16. He signed his first professional football contract with St. Mirren in 2007 when he was 16 and made an instant impact in the team. They were in the Ghana Division One League when he joined them in the 2007–08 season. His key striking abilities and performances qualified St. Mirren to the Premiership for the first time in the club's history. His brace against Fair Point on the final day of the league secured the Division One Zone III title and sealed their qualification. He was the club's top scorer and second top scorer in the National Division One league.

When the team qualified to the GPL for the first time he was registered as one of their senior squad members when he was 16 years old on 30 October 2008. He earned the discovery player of the season award in the 2008–09 season after he won five man of the match awards and got 5 goals from 15 games for his club.

=== Hearts of Oak ===
Otoo signed for the 2009–2010 season with Accra Hearts of Oak SC on a 3-year deal. He finished his debut season with the club with 10 league goals in 19 matches and a consecutive individual title winning the Ghana Premier League's best player of the season. In September 2010, he moved to Tunisian club Esperance Sportive de Tunis on a 4-month loan deal worth $150,000. He was initially set to join the club on a permanent deal for a deal worth $500,000 however it was renegotiated into a loan deal. His time at the side did not go as structured as he was pushed into the reserves side and only made one appearance for the senior side. However he had the opportunity of winning a silver medal when ES Tunis lost the 2010 CAF Champions league final to TP Mazembe in late 2010.

Mahatma Otoo returned to Hearts of Oak in the second round of the 2010–11 season, help the club finish 10th in the league. The following season, 2011–12, he scored 10 goals in the league. Otoo was made captain of side by Charles Akonnor because of his way of playing and fighting spirit. He scored a hat-trick, which was the first in 2012–13 season in the 5–2 win over New Edubiase. Otoo scored a brace against Berekum Arsenal. Otoo renewed his contract with Accra Hearts of Oak for another season in May 2013. Otoo scored a hat-trick against Tema Youth on the final game of the season and win the top scorer of Ghana Premier League with 20 goals. At the end of the season, he was adjudged the Ghana Premier League best player for the second time and the SWAG Premier League player of the year.

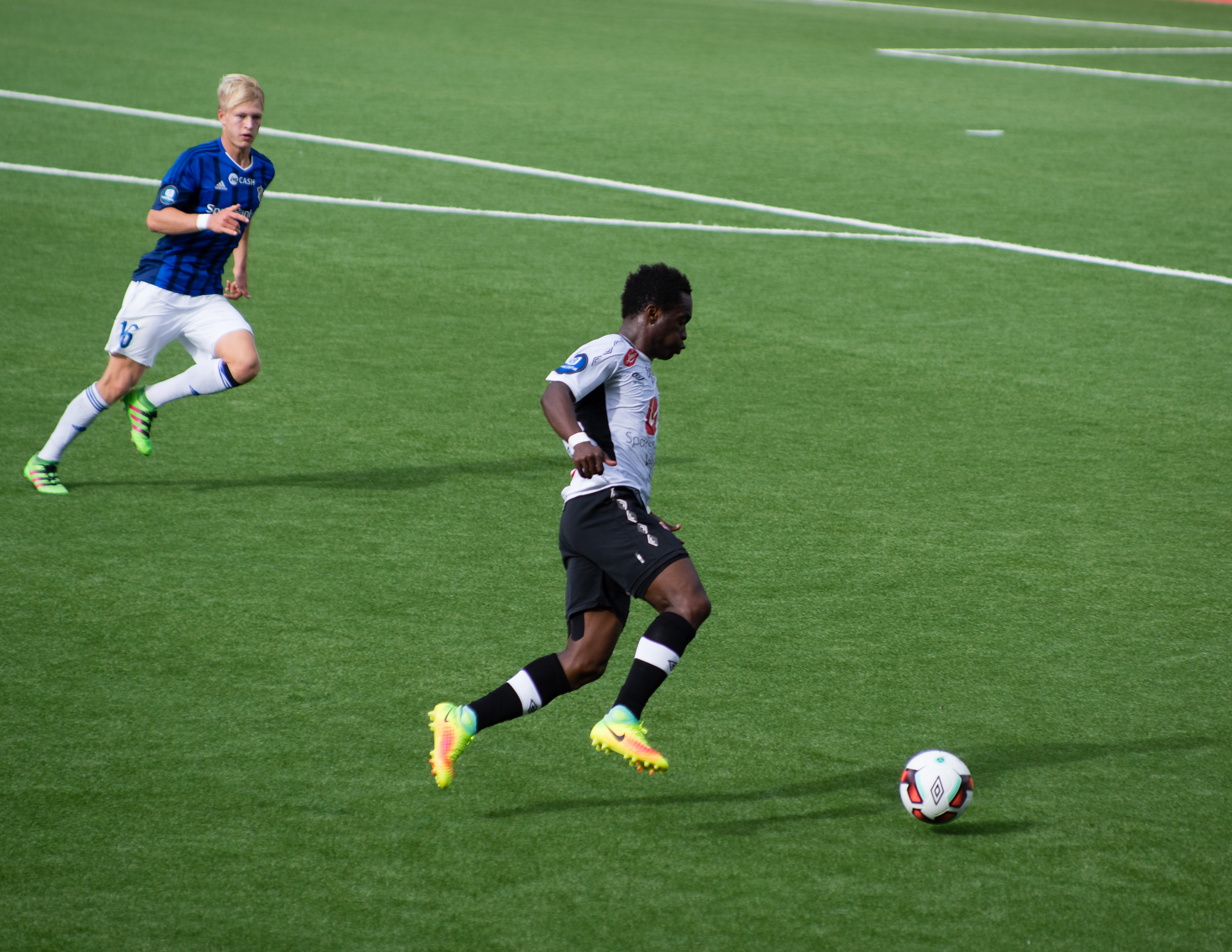
Otoo (white shirt) playing for Sogndal in 2016

=== Sogndal ===
His performance attracted European clubs, with Club Brugge and Sogndal being front runners to land his signature. He moved to Sogndal on a

three-year contract for a reported fee of 300,000 euros in the summer transfer window of 2013. On 18 October 2015, during the 2015 Norwegian First Division, he scored a brace against Hønefoss BK to help Sogndal win the 1.divisjon and gain promotion back into the Norwegian top flight at a canter, for the 2016 Tippeligaen after spending one season in the 1.divisjon. He ended the season as the club's second top goal scorer with 13 league goals and 15 goals in all competitions trailing only to Kristian Opseth who scored 16 league goals and 17 goals in all competition.

He left the club on 1 January 2017.

== International career ==
=== Youth ===
Otoo played formerly in the Ghana national under-17 football team, he was later promoted to the Ghana national under-20 football team in 2011.

In September 2011, Otoo played for the Black Meteors of Ghana in the 2011 All-Africa Games in Maputo, Mozambique. He was a top goalscorer of the tournament with 4 goals in 4 games helping Ghana to gold by scoring South Africa in the final.

In March 2013, Otoo was called up to the Ghana national football team by coach Kwesi Appiah. Appiah described him as a “special player”.

=== Senior ===
After his successful first season was called up for the Ghana national football team for the friendly game on 1 October 2009 against Argentina national football team and played in the game to mark his international senior debut. In January 2015, he was named on the Ghana squad for the 2015 Africa Cup of Nations. He made one appearance after coming on in the 78th minute for Jordan Ayew in their second Group C match against Algeria. The match ended in a 1–0 victory for Ghana.

== Personal life ==
On 4 March 2020, he lost his mother Love Habibatu Ankrah after battling with a short illness. Two days after her death, Otoo scored a goal in a match against Adanaspor and was seen crying and raising his hands to the skies and later going down in celebration whilst his teammates surrounded him to console him. He later took to both Twitter and Facebook to dedicate his goal to the memory of his late mother. He posted “I dedicate today’s goal to my mum, May Her Soul Rest In Peace.”

== Career statistics ==
As of 6 November 2016

Season	Club	Division	League		Cup		Total	
Season	Club	Division	Apps	Goals	Apps	Goals	Apps	Goals
2013	Sogndal	Tippeligaen	10	1	0	0	10	1
2014	Sogndal	Tippeligaen	27	9	3	3	30	12
2015	Sogndal	OBOS-ligaen	26	13	3	2	29	15
2016	Sogndal	Tippeligaen	20	3	3	0	23	3
Career Total			83	26	9	5	92	31

== Honours ==
St. Mirren

- Ghana Division One League Zone III: 2007–08

ES Tunis

- CAF Champions League runner up: 2010

Sogndal

- 1.divisjon: 2015

Ghana U23

- All-Africa Games: 2011

Individual

- All-Africa Games Top scorer: 2011
- Ghana Premier League Discovery Player of the Season: 2008–09
- Ghana Premier League Best player of the season: 2009–10, 2012–13
- Ghana Premier League Top scorer: 2012–13
- SWAG GPL Player of the Year: 2012–13
