= Thando Mngomeni =

South African soccer player

Personal information
- Full name: Thando Mngomeni
- Date of birth: 11 February 1983 (age 43)
- Place of birth: Cape Town, South Africa
- Height: 1.87 m (6 ft 2 in)
- Position: Midfielder

Team information
- Current team: Magic FC
- Number: 10

Senior career*
| Years | Team | Apps | (Gls) |
| 2000–2002 | Santos | 11 | (7) |
| 2002–2004 | Supersport United | 32 | (9) |
| 2004–2005 | Helsingborgs IF | 29 | (3) |
| 2005–2006 | Bush Bucks | 9 | (0) |
| 2007–2008 | Engen Santos | 36 | (3) |
| 2008–2009 | Mamelodi Sundowns | 16 | (0) |
| 2009–2013 | Bidvest Wits | 43 | (3) |

International career^{‡}
| 2004–2007 | South Africa | 5 | |
- * Club domestic league appearances and goals as of 1 June 2011 ‡ National team caps and goals as of 1 June 2011

Thando Mngomeni (born 11 February 1983 in Cape Town, Western Cape) is a South African football (soccer) midfielder.

Thando is a pure example of South Africa's unorthodox style of play.

He hails from Gugulethu on the Cape Flats and is the younger brother of former Orlando Pirates player and South African international Thabo Mngomeni.

== Career ==
Mngomeni spent a season and a half in Sweden with Helsingborgs IF and made 29 appearances before returning to South Africa claiming he could not cope.

He returned to Santos after semi-retirement and impressed with some good performances during the 2007/08 season. He signed for Mamelodi Sundowns and moved to Bidvest Wits after a year and half.

He is currently playing in Cape Town for a 2nd division club, Magic FC.

== International career ==
He has so far been capped five times.

== Interest outside football ==
Thando Mngomeni has acquired shares in an online soccer/football community called TheSoccerPages.Com to begin a career as a blogger and commentator.

He has taken on a role as co-host of a monthly live soccer/football talk show called Diski Nites in Cape Town.

He is also consulting with youth players helping them one-on-one with advice and skills training.

== See also ==
- List of African association football families
