= Shawky Gharieb =

Egyptian football manager (born 1959)

Personal information
- Full name: Shawky Gharieb Bayoumi
- Date of birth: 26 February 1959 (age 67)
- Place of birth: El Mahalla El Kubra, Egypt
- Position: Midfielder

Team information
- Current team: Al-Merrikh (manager)

Senior career*
| Years | Team | Apps | (Gls) |
| 1978–1993 | Ghazl El-Mehalla | | |

International career
| 1979–1988 | Egypt | 75 | (3) |

Managerial career
- 2001: Egypt U20
- 2004–2011: Egypt (assistant coach)
- 2011–2013: Smouha
- 2013: Ismaily
- 2013–2014: Egypt
- 2015–2017: El Entag El Harby
- 2018–2022: Egypt U23
- 2022–2023: Al Mokawloon Al Arab
- 2024: Ismaily
- 2024–2025: Ghazl El Mahalla
- 2025–: Al-Merrikh
Medal record
Men's football
Representing Egypt (as player)
Africa Cup of Nations
| Winner | Egypt 1986 |
African Games
| Gold medal – first place | 1987 Nairobi |
Men's football
Representing Egypt (as manager)
Africa U-23 Cup of Nations
| Winner | Egypt 2019 |
FIFA U-20 World Cup
| Third place | Argentina 2001 |
Africa U-20 Cup of Nations
| Third place | Ethiopia 2001 |
- * Club domestic league appearances and goals

Shawky Gharieb Bayoumi (Arabic: شوقي غريب بيومي) (born 26 February 1959) is a former football midfielder who played for Ghazl El-Mehalla and the Egypt national football team. He managed the Egypt side that won the bronze medal at the 2001 FIFA World Youth Championship in Argentina.

As a player, Gharieb made several appearances for the Egypt national football team. He participated in four editions of the African Cup of Nations, and was part of the title-winning squad in 1986. He also played for Egypt at the 1984 Summer Olympics in Los Angeles.

He currently coaches Egyptian Premiere League side Al-Mokawoloon Al-Arab.

== International goals ==
As of match played 21 July 1988.
Scores and results list Egypt's goal tally first.

| # | Date | Venue | Opponent | Result | Competition |
|---|---|---|---|---|---|
| 1. | 7 July 1984 | Cairo, Egypt | Cameroon | 2–0 | Friendly |
| 2. | 13 March 1986 | Cairo, Egypt | Ivory Coast | 2–0 | 1986 Africa Cup of Nations |
| 3. | 12 July 1987 | Nairobi, Kenya | Kenya | 3–1 | 1988 Summer Olympics Qualifiers |

== Honours ==
=== Player ===
Ghazl El-Mahalla

- Egypt Cup Runner-up: 1975, 1979, 1986, 1993

Egypt

- Africa Cup of Nations: 1986
- African Games: 1987

==== Individual ====
- Africa Cup of Nations Dream Team: 1980

=== Manager ===
Egypt

- Africa U-23 Cup of Nations: 2019
- FIFA U-20 World Cup Third place: 2001
- Africa U-20 Cup of Nations Third place: 2001

==== Individual ====
- 2019 Africa U-23 Cup of Nations Best Coach of the Tournament
