= Habib Mohammed (footballer, born 1997) =

Ghanaian footballer (born 1997)

Personal information
- Date of birth: 4 July 1997 (age 29)
- Place of birth: Sunyani, Ghana
- Height: 1.82 m (6 ft 0 in)
- Position: Centre-back

Team information
- Current team: Al-Naft
- Number: 17

Youth career
- Allah Koso FC
- Aston Villa FC

Senior career*
Years	Team	Apps	(Gls)
2017–2019	Ashanti Gold	10	(1)
2019–2021	Asante Kotoko	33	(0)
2021–2022	Dreams	5	(0)
2022	Sekhukhune United	0	(0)
2022–2023	Ethiopian Insurance	22	(0)
2023–2024	Adama City	8	(1)
2024–2025	Fasil Kenema	21	(0)
2025–2026	Al-Hashd		
2026–	Al-Naft		

International career^{‡}
2019	Ghana U23	5	(1)
2019	Ghana A'	4	(0)
- * Club domestic league appearances and goals as of 4 September 2026 ‡ National team caps and goals as of 20 October 2019

Habib Mohammed (born 4 July 1997) is a Ghanaian professional footballer who plays as a centre-back for Iraqi club Al-Naft. He has also represented Ghana at under-23 and home-based national-team level.

Mohammed began his career in Ghana and played for Ashanti Gold before joining Asante Kotoko in 2019, where he won the 2019 GFA Normalization Committee Special Competition. After leaving Kotoko in 2021, he played for Dreams FC before continuing his career in South Africa, Ethiopia and Iraq. At international level, Mohammed was part of the Ghana A' team that finished runners-up at the 2019 WAFU Cup of Nations and represented the Ghana U23 team at the 2019 Africa U-23 Cup of Nations, making five appearances and scoring once.

== Club career ==
=== Early career and Ashanti Gold ===
Mohammed began his career with lower-division side Allah Koso FC before moving to Aston Villa FC. He later joined Bofoakwa Tano, where he played in the Ghana Division One League.

In January 2017, Mohammed joined Ashanti Gold, making the step up to the Ghana Premier League. He made his league debut on 22 February 2017 in a 1–1 draw against Tema Youth. Mohammed made three league appearances during his first season and featured more regularly in the 2018 campaign, making seven appearances and scoring once before the season was abandoned.

=== Asante Kotoko ===
In January 2019, Mohammed joined Asante Kotoko from Ashanti Gold on a three-year contract. He made his competitive debut in April 2019 during the 2019 GFA Normalization Competition. Mohammed was part of the Kotoko side that won the Tier I competition, defeating Karela United on penalties in the final to qualify for the 2019–20 CAF Champions League.

Mohammed featured in Kotoko's subsequent CAF Champions League campaign, including both legs of their preliminary-round tie against Kano Pillars. After a 3–2 defeat in Nigeria, Kotoko won the return leg 2–0 at the Baba Yara Sports Stadium to advance 4–3 on aggregate.

He made nine league appearances during the truncated 2019–20 Ghana Premier League season and 22 appearances in the 2020–21 season.

=== Dreams FC ===
In October 2021, Mohammed joined Dreams FC as a free agent following the expiration of his contract with Asante Kotoko. He signed a one-year contract with an option for an extension.

Mohammed featured for Dreams during the first half of the 2021–22 Ghana Premier League season. In December 2021, he was named man of the match after helping the club to a 2–1 victory over Bibiani Gold Stars.

=== South Africa ===
In January 2022, Mohammed signed a three-year contract with South African club Sekhukhune United. However, he was unable to feature for the club after Sekhukhune had filled their quota of foreign players.

Mohammed subsequently moved to Swallows FC, but his registration was delayed by the late arrival of his International Transfer Certificate.

=== Ethiopia ===
After his spell in South Africa, Mohammed moved to Ethiopia, joining Ethiopian Insurance for the 2022–23 season. He became a regular in the club's defence, making 22 league appearances as Ethiopian Insurance finished third in the Ethiopian Premier League. Mohammed featured alongside fellow Ghanaian Bashiru Umar and played the full match against eventual champions Saint George in March 2023.

Mohammed joined Adama City for the 2023–24 season, making eight league appearances and scoring once before moving to Fasil Kenema during the campaign. He made seven league appearances for Fasil Kenema during the remainder of the season and a further 14 appearances in 2024–25.

=== Career in Iraq ===
In September 2025, Mohammed moved to Iraq to join Al-Hashd. He spent the first half of the 2025–26 season with the club before joining Al-Naft in February 2026.

Mohammed established himself in Al-Naft's defence during the second half of the Iraq Stars League season, making 20 league appearances.

== International career ==
Mohammed made his debut for Ghana's home-based national team in November 2018 in the Dr Hage Geingob Cup against Namibia. In 2019, he was selected for Ghana's squad for qualification for the 2020 African Nations Championship and was subsequently named in the 21-man squad for the 2019 WAFU Cup of Nations in Senegal. Mohammed featured in central defence as Ghana reached the WAFU Cup final, where they drew 1–1 with hosts Senegal before losing 3–1 on penalties.

Later that year, Mohammed represented the Ghana U23 team at the 2019 Africa U-23 Cup of Nations in Egypt. He started Ghana's opening match against Cameroon and scored an 87th-minute equaliser in a 1–1 draw. He remained part of Ghana's defence as the team progressed from the group stage and reached the semi-finals.

Mohammed made five appearances and scored once during the tournament as Ghana finished fourth, narrowly missing qualification for the 2020 Olympic football tournament.

== Personal life ==
Mohammed is Muslim. In August 2021, he was invited by the Bono Regional Police Service for causing an alleged distraction and fight at a Pub & Night Club in Sunyani in the process hurting the facility owner.

== Honours ==
Asante Kotoko

- GFA Normalization Committee Special Competition: 2019

Ghana A'

- WAFU Cup of Nations runner-up: 2019
