= Kebson Kamanga =

Zambian footballer (born 1997)

Personal information
- Date of birth: 16 June 1997 (age 29)
- Place of birth: Lusaka, Zambia
- Height: 1.90 m (6 ft 3 in)
- Position: Defender

Team information
- Current team: Zanaco F.C.

Senior career*
| Years | Team | Apps | (Gls) |
| 2016–2017 | Zanaco F.C. | | |
| 2018–2019 | Nkwazi F.C. | | |
| 2019– | Zanaco F.C. | | |

International career
| 2019– | Zambia | 2 | (0) |
- * Club domestic league appearances and goals

Kebson Kamanga (born 16 June 1997) is a Zambian football defender who currently plays for Zanaco F.C.
