= Katlego Pule =

South African soccer player

Personal information
- Date of birth: 10 September 1990 (age 36)
- Place of birth: Soweto, South Africa
- Position: Right-back

Team information
- Current team: Bidvest Wits
- Number: 2

Youth career
- Bidvest Wits

Senior career*
Years	Team	Apps	(Gls)
2010–	Bidvest Wits	24	(1)
- * Club domestic league appearances and goals as of 11 July 2013 ‡ National team caps and goals as of 11 July 2013

Katlego Pule (born 10 September 1990) is a South African football (soccer) defender for Premier Soccer League club Bidvest Wits.
