= Sanele Tshabalala =

South African footballer (born 1998)

Personal information
- Date of birth: 12 May 1998 (age 28)
- Place of birth: Dobsonville, South Africa
- Height: 1.77 m (5 ft 10 in)
- Position: Goalkeeper

Team information
- Current team: Kruger United
- Number: 50

Youth career
- Orlando Pirates
- –2018: Bidvest Wits
- 2018–2019: Kaizer Chiefs

Senior career*
Years	Team	Apps	(Gls)
2019–2024	Moroka Swallows	9	(0)
2024–2025	Mamelodi Sundowns	0	(0)
2025–	Lamontville Golden Arrows	0	(0)

International career^{‡}
- South Africa U20
- * Club domestic league appearances and goals as of 4 January 2026 ‡ National team caps and goals as of 10 January 2022

Sanele Tshabalala (born 12 May 1998) is a South African professional soccer player who plays as a goalkeeper for Lamontville Golden Arrows.

Born in Dobsonville, Tshabalala played youth football for Orlando Pirates and Bidvest Wits before joining Kaizer Chiefs's academy in 2018. He joined Moroka Swallows in 2019. He represented the South Africa under-20 team at the 2017 Africa U-20 Cup of Nations.
