= Andile Mbanjwa =

South African goalkeeper (born 1998)

Personal information
- Full name: Andile Kwanele Mbanjwa
- Date of birth: 30 March 1998 (age 28)
- Position: Goalkeeper

Team information
- Current team: AmaZulu FC
- Number: 38

Senior career*
Years	Team	Apps	(Gls)
2017–2018	Mthatha Bucks	7	(0)
2018–2021	Richards Bay	12	(0)
2023–	AmaZulu FC	1	(0)

International career
2019–	South Africa U23		
- * Club domestic league appearances and goals as of 28/5/25 @ 05:05(AEST)

Andile Kwanele Mbanjwa (born 30 March 1998) is a South African professional soccer player who plays as a goalkeeper for PSL side AmaZulu
