= Karim El Eraki =

Egyptian footballer (born 1997)

Personal information
- Full name: Karim Hesham Mohamed Mohamed El Eraki
- Date of birth: 29 November 1997 (age 28)
- Place of birth: Egypt
- Height: 1.74 m (5 ft 9 in)
- Position: Right-back

Team information
- Current team: Al Masry
- Number: 7

Youth career
- Al Masry

Senior career*
Years	Team	Apps	(Gls)
2017–	Al Masry	258	(4)

International career^{‡}
2019–2021	Egypt U23	9	(2)
- * Club domestic league appearances and goals as of 12:33, 26 November 2025 (UTC) ‡ National team caps and goals as of 12:33, 26 November 2025 (UTC)

Karim Hesham Mohamed Mohamed El Eraki (Arabic: كريم العراقي; born 29 November 1997), is an Egyptian footballer who plays for Egyptian Premier League side Al Masry as a right-back and the Egypt national team.

== Honours ==
=== Egypt ===
- Africa U-23 Cup of Nations Champions: 2019
