= Aboubacar Kouyaté =

Ivorian footballer (born 1998)

Personal information
- Full name: Aboubacar Sidiki Kouyaté
- Date of birth: 3 November 1998 (age 27)
- Place of birth: Ivory Coast
- Position: Defender

Team information
- Current team: Saint-Étienne B

Senior career*
Years	Team	Apps	(Gls)
-2017	Monaco B	1	(0)
2018	San Martín	10	(0)
2019-	Saint-Étienne B	14	(1)
- * Club domestic league appearances and goals

Aboubacar Sidiki Kouyaté (born 3 November 1998) is an Ivorian footballer who plays as a defender for Saint-Étienne B.

== Career ==
Before the 2018 season, Kouyaté signed for San Martín in Peru after playing for the reserves of French Ligue 1 side Monaco, where he made 10 league appearances and scored 0 goals.

Before the second half of 2019/20, he signed for the reserves of Saint-Étienne in the French Ligue 1.
