= Jackson Kakunta =

Zambian footballer (born 1998)

Personal information
- Date of birth: 4 October 1998 (age 28)
- Position: Goalkeeper

Team information
- Current team: Power Dynamos

Senior career*
Years	Team	Apps	(Gls)
2016–	Power Dynamos		
2017	→ Red Arrows (loan)		

International career^{‡}
2020–	Zambia	3	(0)
- * Club domestic league appearances and goals as of 11 October 2021 ‡ National team caps and goals as of 11 October 2021

Jackson Kakunta (born 4 October 1998) is a Zambian football goalkeeper, who plays for 31 Jackson Kakunta. He has also played for Power Dynamos, as well as Red Arrows FC, and Napsa Stars FC.
