= Silas Gnaka =

Ivorian footballer

Personal information
- Date of birth: 18 December 1998 (age 27)
- Place of birth: Ouragahio, Ivory Coast
- Height: 1.79 m (5 ft 10 in)
- Position: Left-back

Team information
- Current team: ML Vitebsk
- Number: 8

Youth career
- Aspire Academy
- Eupen

Senior career*
Years	Team	Apps	(Gls)
2017–2022	Eupen	63	(0)
2022–2026	1. FC Magdeburg	125	(5)
2026–	ML Vitebsk	0	(0)

International career^{‡}
2019	Ivory Coast U23	5	(0)
- * Club domestic league appearances and goals as of 18 May 2026 ‡ National team caps and goals as of 05:05, 3 May 2022 (UTC)

Silas Gnaka (born 18 December 1998) is an Ivorian professional footballer who plays as left-back for Belarusian Premier League club ML Vitebsk.

== Club career ==
A product of Aspire Academy in Senegal, Gnaka signed a professional football contract with Belgian club Eupen in January 2017. He became a regular left-sided defender for the club under manager Claude Makélélé.

In June 2022, German club 1. FC Magdeburg, newly promoted to the 2. Bundesliga, announced that Gnaka would join the club for the 2022–23 season.

On 2 July 2026, Gnaka moved to ML Vitebsk in Belarus.

== International career ==
In March 2019, Gnaka earned his first call-up to the Ivory Coast under-23 team for a pair of 2019 Africa U-23 Cup of Nations qualification matches against Niger. He was named in the squad for the Africa U-23 Cup of Nations finals, which took place in November 2019 in Egypt. He played every minute of the five tournament games, as the team finished runners-up after a 2–1 defeat in the final against Egypt.

In 2021, Gnaka was named in the Ivory Coast squad for the Olympic football tournament at the 2020 Summer Olympics. He did not make an appearance during the competition, while the team got eliminated in the quarter-final against Spain.

== Honours ==
Ivory Coast U23

- Africa U-23 Cup of Nations: runner-up 2019
