= Edward Sarpong =

Ghanaian footballer

Personal information
- Date of birth: 8 January 1997 (age 29)
- Place of birth: Accra, Ghana
- Height: 1.75 m (5 ft 9 in)
- Position: Left-back

Youth career
- 2014–2015: Unistar Soccer Academy
- 2015–2016: Real Avilés
- 2016: Portimonense

Senior career*
Years	Team	Apps	(Gls)
2016–2019	Portimonense	5	(0)
2017	→ Farense (loan)	0	(0)
2018	→ Vendas Novas (loan)	14	(2)
2019–2022	Esperança Lagos	35	(2)
2022–2024	Džiugas	61	(1)
2024	Birkirkara	12	(0)
- * Club domestic league appearances and goals as of 13 May 2024

Edward Sarpong is a Ghanaian professional footballer who plays as a left-back.

== Club career ==
Sarpong made his professional debut in the Segunda Liga for Portimonense on 6 August 2016 in a game against Sporting B.

In December 2021, he signed with Lithuanian A Lyga club FC Džiugas.

In January 2024, Sarpong joined Maltese Premier League club Birkirkara.
