= Maxime Nagoli =

Ivorian footballer

Personal information
- Date of birth: 20 December 2000 (age 25)
- Position: Goalkeeper

Team information
- Current team: SOL FC

Oupoh Maxime Nagoli (born 20 December 2000) is an Ivorian footballer who plays as a goalkeeper for SOL FC.
