= Thamsanqa Sangweni =

South African soccer player

Thami Sangweni
Personal information
- Full name: Thamsanqa Sangweni
- Date of birth: 26 May 1989 (age 37)
- Place of birth: Empangeni, South Africa
- Position: Defensive midfielder

Youth career
- Love and Peace
- Golden Chiefs
- Dondotha All Stars

Senior career*
Years	Team	Apps	(Gls)
2009–2012	AmaZulu	50	(9)
2012–2015	Mamelodi Sundowns	11	(1)
2014	→ Ajax Cape Town (loan)	7	(0)
2014–2017	Chippa United	58	(5)
2017–2018	Orlando Pirates	3	(0)
2018–2019	Chippa United	13	(0)
2019	Richards Bay	6	(0)
2019–2021	Maritzburg United	2	(0)
2021	Chippa United	8	(0)
2021	TS Sporting	8	(0)

International career
2012–2015	South Africa	3	(0)
- * Club domestic league appearances and goals as of 10 November 2022

Thamsanqa Sangweni (born 26 May 1989 in Empangeni, KwaZulu-Natal) is a South African football (soccer) midfielder who last played for TS Sporting.

He is the younger brother of former Orlando Pirates player Siyabonga Sangweni.

== Career ==
In 2017 Sangweni moved from Chippa United to Orlando Pirates on a two-year deal, following in his brother's footsteps who had played there for five years.

== See also ==
- List of African association football families
