= Ngosa Sunzu =

Zambian footballer (born 1998)

Personal information
- Date of birth: 19 July 1998 (age 28)
- Place of birth: Chililabombwe, Zambia
- Height: 1.89 m (6 ft 2 in)
- Position: Midfielder

Team information
- Current team: Silon Táborsko
- Number: 26

Senior career*
Years	Team	Apps	(Gls)
2016–2017	NAPSA Stars	?	(?)
2016–2017	→ Hapoel Ra'anana (loan)	0	(0)
2018–2020	Buildcon Ndola	?	(?)
2020–2021	Beitar Tel Aviv Bat Yam	28	(0)
2021–2024	Teplice	7	(0)
2021–2024	→→Teplice B	15	(2)
2023	→ Příbram (loan)	6	(0)
2024–	Silon Táborsko	20	(0)

International career^{‡}
2017	Zambia U20	1	(0)
2019	Zambia U23	3	(0)
2018–	Zambia	1	(0)
- * Club domestic league appearances and goals as of 4 January 2025 ‡ National team caps and goals as of 11:00, 2 May 2022 (UTC)

Ngosa Sunzu (born 19 July 1998) is a Zambian footballer who currently plays as a midfielder for Czech side Silon Táborsko.

== Club career ==
Sunzu joined Czech top flight team Teplice in November 2021. He went on to make his debut a month later, after overcoming a muscle strain.

== Personal life ==
Ngosa is the younger brother of fellow Zambian international footballer Stoppila Sunzu.

== Career statistics ==
=== Club ===
As of 2 May 2022.

Club	Season	League			National Cup		League Cup		Continental		Other		Total	
Club	Season	Division	Apps	Goals	Apps	Goals	Apps	Goals	Apps	Goals	Apps	Goals	Apps	Goals
Hapoel Ra'anana (loan)	2016–17	Ligat Ha`Al	0	0	0	0	0	0	–		0	0	0	0
Beitar Tel Aviv Bat Yam	2020–21	Liga Leumit	28	0	4 (Note: Appearances in the Israel State Cup)	0	0	0	–		0	0	32	0
Teplice	2021–22	Fortuna liga	5	0	0	0	–		–		0	0	5	0
Teplice B	2021–22	ČFL	4	0	–		–		–		0	0	4	0
Career total			37	0	4	0	0	0	0	0	0	0	41	0

=== International ===
As of match played 2 May 2022.

National team	Year	Apps	Goals
Zambia	2018	1	0
Total		1	0
