= Ghana national under-23 football team =

Ghana U-23
- Nickname: The Black Meteors
- Association: Ghana Olympic Committee (GOC)
- Confederation: ANOCA (Africa)
- Head coach: Ibrahim Tanko
- Home stadium: Accra Sports Stadium
- FIFA code: GHA
First colours	Second colours

Olympic Games
- Appearances: 6 (first in 1964)
- Best result: 3rd: 1992

Africa U-23 Cup of Nations
- Appearances: 1 (first in 2019)
- Best result: Fourth place (2019)

All-Africa Games
- Appearances: 5 (first in 1973)
- Best result: Gold medal (2011)
Medal record
Men's Football
Bronze medal – third place	1992 Barcelona	Team
All-Africa Games
Bronze medal – third place	1978 Algiers	N/A
Bronze medal – third place	2003 Abuja	N/A
Gold medal – first place	2011 Mozambique	Team

Olympic medal record

Men's Football
Bronze medal – third place	1992 Barcelona	Team

Ghana U23 football team (also known as the Ghana Olympic football team or Black Meteors) represents Ghana in international football competitions in Olympic Games, All-Africa Games, and CAF U-23 Championship. The selection is limited to players aged 23 and under the age of 23, except during the Olympic Games where the use of three overage players is allowed. The team is controlled by the Ghana Football Association (GFA).

The team had qualified for five straight Olympic Games Football Tournaments when the tournament was still a full senior national team competition. In 1992, they became the first African country to win a medal at Olympic Games football. The Black Meteors failed to qualify for Beijing 2008. Although they were the 2011 All-Africa Games champions, the Ghana Olympic football team failed to qualify for the 2011 CAF U-23 Championship, and thus did not participate in London 2012.

== History ==
Ghana appeared in the quarter-final of the Olympic Games in 1964, where they were beaten by Romania in the quarter-final. They played in the 1968 and 1972 Olympic tournaments, but never progressed further than the group stages. They also qualified in 1976, then withdrew.

In 1992, Ghana reached the semi-final for the first time. They defeated Australia 2-0 to claim their first bronze medal in the event, and thus became the first African country to win a medal in football.

Ghana reached the quarter-finals of the Olympics football tournament in 1996 for the second time; they lost 4–2 against Brazil.

In the Athens 2004 tournament Ghana were eliminated in the group stages after they lost a must-win game 1–0 against Japan. The team were not able to qualify for Beijing 2008 and London 2012.

== Results and fixtures ==
Legend

Win Draw Lose Fixture

== Coaching staff ==
=== Current coaching staff ===
As of 28 June 2022

Position	Name
Head coach	(Ghana) Ibrahim Tanko
Assistant coach	(Ghana) Michael Osei
Assistant coach	(Ghana) Godwin Attram
Goalkeepers trainer	(Ghana) Cudjoe Addo
Team doctor	(Ghana) Christopher Adomako
Masseur	(Ghana) Anum George Amassah
Welfare officer	(Ghana) Ablade Kumah
Equipment officer	(Ghana) Emmanuel Opoku

Source: Ghana Football Association

=== Manager history ===
As of 5 June 2021 after the match against Japan.

Manager	Period	Record				
Manager	Period	Matches	Won	Draw	Lost	Win %
(Ghana) Malik Jabir	2015	–	–	–	–	–
(Ghana) Yusif Abubakar	2019	0	0	0	0	0%
(Ghana) Ibrahim Tanko	2019	11	4	3	4	36.4%
(Ghana) Paa Kwesi Fabin	2019–2020	1	0	0	1	0%
(Ghana) Ibrahim Tanko	2022–	4	3	1	0	75%

== Players ==
=== Current squad ===
The following players were called up for the 2023 U-23 Africa Cup of Nations qualification matches against Algeria on 24 and 28 March 2023.

No.	Pos.	Player	Date of birth (age)	Club
	GK	Haruna Aziz Dari	23 May 2001 (age 25)	(Ghana Football Association) Bechem United
	GK	Ibrahim Danlad	2 December 2002 (age 23)	(Ghana Football Association) Asante Kotoko
	GK	William Essu	9 May 2002 (age 24)	(Ghana Football Association) Legon Cities
	DF	Samuel Abbey-Ashie Quaye	14 April 2001 (age 25)	(Ghana Football Association) Accra Great Olympics
	DF	Emmanuel Cudjoe	11 April 1998 (age 28)	(Ghana Football Association) Attram de Visser
	DF	Aaron Essel	30 July 2005 (age 21)	(Ghana Football Association) Bechem United
	DF	David Oppong Afrane	3 December 2002 (age 23)	(Ghana Football Association) King Faisal Babes
	DF	Augustine Randolf	26 March 2001 (age 25)	(Ghana Football Association) Karela United
	DF	Godfred Poku Wakii	16 October 2003 (age 23)	(Ghana Football Association) Aduana Stars
	MF	Salim Adams	11 October 2002 (age 24)	(United States Soccer Federation) Cincinnati
	MF	Emmanuel Essiam	19 December 2003 (age 22)	(Swiss Football Association) Basel
	MF	Eugene Frimpong	2 February 2003 (age 23)	(Royal Spanish Football Federation) Real Valladolid
	MF	Dominic Nsobila	19 December 2002 (age 23)	(Ghana Football Association) Accra Lions
	MF	Alex Opoku Sarfo	20 October 2004 (age 22)	(Ghana Football Association) Benab
	MF	Abass Samari Salifu	2 July 2004 (age 22)	(Ghana Football Association) Accra Lions
	MF	Seidu Saraj	29 January 2001 (age 25)	(Ghana Football Association) Accra Hearts of Oak
	MF	Simba Sylvester	29 July 2001 (age 25)	(Ghana Football Association) Dreams
	FW	Yusub Abdul Razak	2 December 2001 (age 24)	(Ghana Football Association) Accra Great Olympics
	FW	Felix Afena-Gyan	19 January 2003 (age 23)	(Italian Football Federation) Cremonese
	FW	Daniel Afriyie	26 June 2001 (age 25)	(Swiss Football Association) Zürich
	FW	Emmanuel Appau	4 May 2002 (age 24)	(Ghana Football Association) Bibiani Gold Stars
	FW	Issahaku Fatawu	8 March 2004 (age 22)	(Portuguese Football Federation) Sporting CP
	FW	Zubairu Ibrahim	2 June 2004 (age 22)	(Football Association of Serbia) Jedinstvo
	FW	Dede Ishmael	10 December 2001 (age 24)	(Ghana Football Association) Dreams
	FW	Ernest Nuamah	1 November 2003 (age 23)	(Danish Football Association) Nordsjælland
	FW	Emmanuel Yeboah	25 February 2003 (age 23)	(Romanian Football Federation) Cluj

== Previous squads ==
African Games

- 2011 All-Africa Games – squad

Africa U-23 Cup of Nations

- 2019 Africa U-23 Cup of Nations – squads

== Competitive record ==
=== Olympic Games ===
Summer Olympics record
Year	Round	Position	GP	W	D	L	GS	GA
(Greece) 1896	No football tournament	-	-	-	-	-	-	-
(France) 1900	Did not participate	-	-	-	-	-	-	-
(United States) 1904	Did not participate	-	-	-	-	-	-	-
(United Kingdom) 1908	Did not participate	-	-	-	-	-	-	-
(Sweden) 1912	Did not participate	-	-	-	-	-	-	-
(Belgium) 1920	Did not participate	-	-	-	-	-	-	-
(France) 1924	Did not participate	-	-	-	-	-	-	-
(Netherlands) 1928	Did not participate	-	-	-	-	-	-	-
(United States) 1932	No football tournament	-	-	-	-	-	-	-
(Germany) 1936	Did not participate	-	-	-	-	-	-	-
(United Kingdom) 1948	Did not participate	-	-	-	-	-	-	-
(Finland) 1952	Did not participate	-	-	-	-	-	-	-
(Australia) 1956	Did not participate	-	-	-	-	-	-	-
(Italy) 1960	Did not participate	-	-	-	-	-	-	-
(Japan) 1964	Quarter-finals	-	3	1	1	1	5	8
(Mexico) 1968	Round 1	-	3	0	2	1	6	8
(Germany) 1972	Round 1	-	3	0	0	3	1	10
(Canada) 1976	Withdrew	-	-	-	-	-	-	-
(Soviet Union) 1980	Withdrew after qualifying	-	-	-	-	-	-	-
(United States) 1984	Did not participate	-	-	-	-	-	-	-
(South Korea) 1988	Did not qualify	-	-	-	-	-	-	-
(Spain) 1992	Third place	3	6	3	2	1	9	6
(United States) 1996	Quarter-finals	8	4	1	1	2	6	8
(Australia) 2000	Did not qualify	-	-	-	-	-	-	-
(Greece) 2004	Round 1	9	3	1	1	1	4	4
(China) 2008	Did not qualify	-	-	-	-	-	-	-
(United Kingdom) 2012	Did not qualify	-	-	-	-	-	-	-
(Brazil) 2016	Did not qualify	-	-	-	-	-	-	-
(Japan) 2020	Did not qualify	-	-	-	-	-	-	-
(France) 2024	Did not qualify	-	-	-	-	-	-	-
Total	Third place	6/27	22	6	7	9	31	44

Note: Football at the Summer Olympics has been an under-23 tournament since 1992.

=== African Games ===
African Games record
Year	Round	Position	GP	W	D	L	GS	GA
(Republic of the Congo) 1965	Did not participate	-	-	-	-	-	-	-
(Mali) 1969	No football tournament	-	-	-	-	-	-	-
(Nigeria) 1973	Semi-finals	-	3					
(Algeria) 1978	Third place	3	3					
(Kenya) 1987	Did not participate	-	-	-	-	-	-	-
(Egypt) 1991	Did not participate	-	-	-	-	-	-	-
(Zimbabwe) 1995	Did not participate	-	-	-	-	-	-	-
(South Africa) 1999	Did not participate	-	-	-	-	-	-	-
(Nigeria) 2003	Third place	3	3					
(Algeria) 2007	Round 1	-	3	0	1	2	1	4
(Mozambique) 2011	Champions	1	4	2	1	1	6	5
Total	5/10	1 Titles	16					

Note: Football at the All-Africa Games has been an under-23 tournament since 1991.

== See also ==
- Sport in Ghana
  - Football in Ghana
    - Women's football in Ghana
- Ghana national football team
- Ghana national under-20 football team
- Ghana national under-17 football team
- Ghana women's national football team
