= Jacques Bertin Nguemaleu =

Cameroonian footballer

Jacques Nguemaleu
Personal information
- Full name: Jacques Bertin Nguemaleu
- Date of birth: 2 September 1989 (age 37)
- Place of birth: Yaoundé, Cameroon
- Height: 1.84 m (6 ft 1/2 in)
- Position: Defender

Team information
- Current team: Nakhon Pathom United
- Number: 25

Youth career
- 2004: Juvenile Academy
- 2005–2007: Union Douala

Senior career*
Years	Team	Apps	(Gls)
2008–2012	Union Douala		
2009–2010	→ Napredak Kruševac (loan)	0	(0)
2013–2014	TTM Lopburi		
2015–	Nakhon Pathom United		

International career^{‡}
2011	Cameroon U-23	4	(0)
- * Club domestic league appearances and goals as of 26-6-2019 ‡ National team caps and goals as of 26-6-2019

Jacques Bertin Nguemaleu (born 2 September 1989 in Yaoundé) is a Cameroonian football defender who plays for TTM Lopburi in the Thai Division 1 League.

== Career ==
The central defender began his career in 2004 with Juvenile Academy FC and signed in 2005 for Union Douala who by 2009 named him as the main team captain. In summer 2009 Nguemaleu joined on loan Serbian SuperLiga side FK Napredak Kruševac.

== National team ==
Nguemaleu was a member of the Cameroon team, that won the 2008 CEMAC Cup and played as well in the 2009 CEMAC Cup and the 2010 CEMAC Cup. He was also member of the Cameroon squad at the 2011 African Nations Championship having played all 3 group matches and the quarter-finals match against where they lost with Angola in a penalty shout-out with Nguemaleu scoring one of Cameroon's penalties.

He was also part of the Cameroon team participating in the 2011 All-Africa Games where his team finished in third place in the tournament. He made 4 appearances.
