= Aboubacar Doumbia (footballer, born 1999) =

Ivorian footballer

Personal information
- Full name: Aboubacar Doumbia
- Date of birth: 12 November 1999 (age 27)
- Place of birth: Attecoube, Ivory Coast
- Height: 1.72 m (5 ft 8 in)
- Position: Forward

Team information
- Current team: Al-Tadamon

Senior career*
Years	Team	Apps	(Gls)
- SO de l'Armée
2019–2020	CSO Amnéville	1	(0)
2020–2021	KPV	17	(6)
2021–2023	Maccabi Netanya	28	(4)
2022	→ Maccabi Petah Tikva (loan)	14	(2)
2022–2023	→ Karmiotissa (loan)	37	(2)
2023–2025	Karmiotissa	55	(9)
2025	Hapoel Haifa	13	(0)
2025–2026	Al-Orobah	30	(4)
2026–	Al-Tadamon	0	(0)

International career^{‡}
2020–2021	Ivory Coast U-20	12	(3)
2019	Ivory Coast U-23	5	(1)
2021–	Ivory Coast	1	(0)
- * Club domestic league appearances and goals as of 27 June 2025 ‡ National team caps and goals as of 18:42, 9 October 2022 (UTC)

Aboubacar Doumbia (born 12 November 1999) is an Ivorian professional footballer who plays as a forward for Al-Tadamon.

== Career ==
On 10 August 2025, Doumbia joined Saudi First Division League club Al-Orobah.
