= Athenkosi Dlala =

South African soccer player (born 1998)

Personal information
- Date of birth: 6 February 1998 (age 28)
- Place of birth: Plettenberg Bay, South Africa
- Height: 1.84 m (6 ft 0 in)
- Position: Midfielder

Team information
- Current team: Chippa United
- Number: 29

Youth career
- SuperSport United

Senior career*
Years	Team	Apps	(Gls)
2018–2021	University of Pretoria	51	(5)
2021–2022	Baroka	14	(0)
2022–2023	Pretoria Callies	4	(0)
2023–2024	Maritzburg United	7	(0)
2024–	Chippa United	2	(0)

International career^{‡}
2021–?	South Africa U23	0	(0)
2015–2019	South Africa	5	(0)
- * Club domestic league appearances and goals as of 3 October 2024 ‡ National team caps and goals as of 19 July 2021

Athenkosi Dlala (born 6 February 1998) is a South African professional soccer player who plays as a midfielder for Chippa United.
