= Al Ahed FC in Asian football =

Continental record of Lebanese football club Al Ahed FC

- Club: Al Ahed FC
- First entry: 2005 AFC Cup
- Latest entry: 2023–24 AFC Cup

Titles
- AFC Cup: 1: 2019

Al Ahed Football Club is a football club based in Beirut, Lebanon. The club's first ever participation in an Asian competition was in the 2005 AFC Cup, where they were drawn with Indian side Dempo and Jordanian side Al-Hussein in the group stage. After finishing second in the group, Ahed faced Sun Hei in the quarter-finals, to whom they lost 2–3 on aggregate.

Prior to winning the competition, their best spell was in 2016, when they reached the semi-finals before being knocked out by Iraqi club Al-Quwa Al-Jawiya 3–4 on aggregate. In 2019, Ahed defeated North Korean side April 25 to win the AFC Cup: they became the first Lebanese side to do so, after Nejmeh and Safa's defeats in the 2005 and 2008 finals, respectively. They reached the final of the AFC Cup once more in 2024, finishing runners-up to Central Coast Mariners of Australia who won 1–0.

== Matches ==
Season	Competition	Round	Club	Home	Away	Aggregate
2005	AFC Cup	GS	(India) Dempo	3–1	4–1	2nd place in Group B
2005	AFC Cup	GS	(Jordan) Al-Hussein	1–1	0–2	2nd place in Group B
2005	AFC Cup	QF	(Hong Kong) Sun Hei	1–0	1–3	2–3
2006	AFC Cup	GS	(India) Mahindra United	2–2	1–2	2nd place in Group B
2006	AFC Cup	GS	(Bahrain) Al-Muharraq	0–2	4–2	2nd place in Group B
2006	AFC Cup	GS	(Bangladesh) Brothers Union	6–2	3–1	2nd place in Group B
2009	AFC Cup	GS	(Uzbekistan) Neftchi Fergana	5–1	1–2	3rd place in Group A
2009	AFC Cup	GS	(Bahrain) Busaiteen	1–1	2–4	3rd place in Group A
2009	AFC Cup	GS	(Yemen) Al-Tilal	3–0	1–2	3rd place in Group A
2010	AFC Cup	GS	(Uzbekistan) Nasaf Qarshi	0–4	0–4	4th place in Group C
2010	AFC Cup	GS	(Kuwait) Kazma	1–2	0–1	4th place in Group C
2010	AFC Cup	GS	(Syria) Al-Jaish	1–1	3–6	4th place in Group C
2011	AFC Cup	GS	(Iraq) Erbil	1–2	2–6	2nd place in Group E
2011	AFC Cup	GS	(Oman) Al-Orouba	2–0	0–1	2nd place in Group E
2011	AFC Cup	GS	(Syria) Al-Karamah	4–1	2–3	2nd place in Group E
2011	AFC Cup	R16	(Thailand) Muangthong United	0–4 (A)		
2012	AFC Cup	GS	(Maldives) VB	5–3	0–1	3rd place in Group C
2012	AFC Cup	GS	(Saudi Arabia) Al-Ettifaq	1–3	0–0	3rd place in Group C
2012	AFC Cup	GS	Al-Kuwait	0–4	0–1	3rd place in Group C
2016	AFC Cup	GS	(Turkmenistan) Altyn Asyr	3–0	0–2	1st place in Group A
2016	AFC Cup	GS	(Jordan) Al-Wehdat	3–2	2–3	1st place in Group A
2016	AFC Cup	GS	(Bahrain) Al-Hidd	1–0	5–2	1st place in Group A
2016	AFC Cup	R16	(Syria) Al-Wahda	4–0 (H)		
2016	AFC Cup	QF	(Bahrain) Al-Muharraq	1–0	2–0	3–0
2016	AFC Cup	SF	(Iraq) Al-Quwa Al-Jawiya	2–3	1–1	3–4
2018	AFC Cup	GS	(Iraq) Al-Zawraa	1–1	1–1	1st place in Group B
2018	AFC Cup	GS	(Bahrain) Manama	3–1	1–0	1st place in Group B
2018	AFC Cup	GS	(Syria) Al-Jaish	1–1	4–1	1st place in Group B
2018	AFC Cup	ZSF	(Iraq) Al-Quwa Al-Jawiya	2–2	1–3	3–5
2019	AFC Cup	GS	(Kuwait) Al-Qadsia	0–0	1–0	1st place in Group C
2019	AFC Cup	GS	(Bahrain) Malkiya	2–1	0–0	1st place in Group C
2019	AFC Cup	GS	(Oman) Al-Suwaiq	4–2	1–0	1st place in Group C
2019	AFC Cup	ZSF	(Jordan) Al-Wehdat	0–0	1–0	1–0
2019	AFC Cup	ZF	(Jordan) Al-Jazeera	1–0	0–0	1–0
2019	AFC Cup	F	(North Korea) April 25	1–0 (N)		
2020	AFC Cup	GS	(Palestine) Hilal Al-Quds	2–1		Cancelled
2020	AFC Cup	GS	(Bahrain) Manama		0–1	Cancelled
2020	AFC Cup	GS	(Syria) Al-Jaish			Cancelled
2021	AFC Cup	GS	(Syria) Al-Wahda	0–0 (N)		1st place in Group A
2021	AFC Cup	GS	(Bahrain) Al-Hidd	2–1 (A)		1st place in Group A
2021	AFC Cup	ZSF	(Bahrain) Al-Muharraq	0–3 (A)		
2023–24	AFC Cup	GS	(Oman) Al-Nahda	2–1 (N)	1–2	2nd place in Group A
2023–24	AFC Cup	GS	(Syria) Al-Fotuwa	2–1 (N)	0–1	2nd place in Group A
2023–24	AFC Cup	ZSF	(Iraq) Al-Kahrabaa	0–1 (N)	1–0	1–1 (4–2 p)
2023–24	AFC Cup	ZF	(Oman) Al-Nahda	1–0 (N)	2–2	3–2
2023–24	AFC Cup	F	(Australia) Central Coast Mariners	0–1 (N)		

Notes

- Goals by Ahed are listed first.
- GS: Group stage
- R16: Round of 16
- QF: Quarter-final
- ZSF: Zonal semi-final
- SF: Semi-final
- ZF: Zonal final
- F: Final

== See also ==
- Football in Lebanon
