= 2016 in Malaysian football =

Football in Malaysia
- Season: 2016

Men's football
- Super League: Johor Darul Ta'zim
- Premier League: Melaka United
- FAM League: MISC-MIFA
- FA Cup: Johor Darul Ta'zim
- Malaysia Cup: Kedah
- Community Shield: Johor Darul Ta'zim

The 2016 season will be the 36th season of competitive association football in Malaysia.

== Promotion and relegation ==
=== Pre-season ===
League	Promoted to league	Relegated from league
Super League	Kedah; Penang; T–Team	ATM; Sime Darby
Premier League	Melaka United; Perlis	Putrajaya SPA

== New and withdrawn teams ==
=== New teams ===
- DYS F.C. (FAM Cup)
- KDMM F.C. (FAM Cup)
- PKNP F.C. (FAM Cup)
- SAMB FC (FAM Cup)
- MPKB-BRI U-Bes F.C. (FAM Cup)
- PB Melayu Malaysia F.C. (FAM Cup)

=== Withdrawn team ===
- LionsXII (Super League)
- Harimau Muda C (FAM Cup)
- Young Fighters F.C. (FAM Cup)
- Putrajaya SPA F.C. (FAM Cup)
- Shahzan Muda FC (FAM Cup)
- Kedah United F.C. (FAM Cup)
- Real Mulia F.C. (FAM Cup)
- Johor DT III (FAM Cup)
- PBAPP FC (FAM Cup)
- TNB Kilat F.C. (FAM Cup)

== National team ==
Win Draw Lose

=== Malaysia national football team ===
==== 2018 FIFA World Cup qualification – AFC second round ====
Pos	Team	Pld	W	D	L	GF	GA	GD	Pts	Qualification	Saudi Arabia	United Arab Emirates	Palestine	Malaysia	East Timor
1	Saudi Arabia	8	6	2	0	28	4	+24	20	World Cup qualifying third round and Asian Cup	—	2–1	3–2	2–0	7–0 (Note: On 12 December 2017, AFC decided to forfeit the first five matches involving Timor-Leste – both v Malaysia, home v United Arab Emirates, away v Saudi Arabia, and home v Palestine due to the use of falsified documents for their players of Timor-Leste.)
2	United Arab Emirates (Note: United Arab Emirates already qualified for the Asian Cup as the host nation.)	8	5	2	1	27	4	+23	17	World Cup qualifying third round	1–1	—	2–0	10–0	8–0
3	Palestine	8	4	2	2	24	5	+19	14	Asian Cup qualifying third round	0–0	0–0	—	6–0	7–0
4	Malaysia	8	2	0	6	7	29	−22	6	Asian Cup qualifying play-off round	0–3 (Note: Match abandoned after 87 minutes due to a group of supporters throwing flares at the pitch. A month later, FIFA awarded Saudi Arabia 3–0 win.)	1–2	0–6	—	1–1
5	Timor-Leste	8	0	0	8	0	44	−44	0	Asian Cup qualifying play-off round	0–10	0–1	1–1	0–1	—

Rules for classification: Qualification tiebreakers
Notes:

24 March 2016 2018 World Cup QC – 2nd round	Saudi Arabia	2–0	Malaysia	King Abdullah Sports City, Jeddah
20:30 UTC+3	Al-Sahlawi 50'; Al-Jassim 74'	Report (FIFA); Report (AFC)		Attendance: 34,839; Referee: Kim Dong-jin (South Korea)

==== 2019 AFC Asian Cup qualification ====
2 June 2016 2019 Asian Cup – play-off	Malaysia	3–0	Timor-Leste	Tan Sri Dato Haji Hassan Yunos Stadium, Johor Bahru
21:00UTC+8	Hazwan 16', 21'; Amri 85'	Report		Attendance: 3,600; Referee: Hiroyuki Kimura (Japan)

7 June 2016 2019 Asian Cup – play-off	Timor-Leste	0–3	Malaysia	Tan Sri Dato Haji Hassan Yunos Stadium, Johor Bahru (Malaysia) (Note: Timor-Leste played their home match in Malaysia.)
21:00 UTC+8		Report	Khair 16'; Hazwan 58'; S. Chanturu 68'	Attendance: 1,145; Referee: Ho Wai Sing (Hong Kong)

==== 2016 AFF Championship ====
Pos	Team	Pld	W	D	L	GF	GA	GD	Pts	Qualification
1	Vietnam	3	3	0	0	5	2	+3	9	Knockout phase
2	Myanmar (H)	3	2	0	1	5	3	+2	6	Knockout phase
3	Malaysia	3	1	0	2	3	4	−1	3	
4	Cambodia	3	0	0	3	4	8	−4	0	

Source: AFF
Rules for classification: Group stage tiebreakers
(H) Hosts

20 November 2016 Group stage	Malaysia	3–2	Cambodia	Yangon, Myanmar
15:00 UTC+06	Syazwan 37'; Amri 69', 80'	Report	Vathanaka 8', 59'	Stadium: Thuwunna YTC Stadium; Referee: Yaqoob Abdul Baki (Oman)

23 November 2016 Group stage	Malaysia	0–1	Vietnam	Thuwunna Stadium, Yangon
15:00 UTC+06		Report	Hoàng 80'	Attendance: 2,542; Referee: Charymurat Kurbanov (Turkmenistan)

26 November 2016 Group stage	Myanmar	1–0	Malaysia	Thuwunna Stadium, Yangon
18:00 UTC+06	David Htan 89'	Report		Attendance: 32,758; Referee: Yaqoob Abdul Baki (Oman)

==== International Friendlies ====
29 March 2016 Friendly	Malaysia	0–0	Macau	Malacca City, Malaysia
20:45 UTC+8				Stadium: Hang Jebat Stadium

17 June 2016 Friendly	Papua New Guinea	2–0	Malaysia	Port Moresby, Papua New Guinea
19:00 UTC+10	Semmy 35', 42'	Report (FAM); Report (goal.com)		Stadium: Sir John Guise Stadium; Referee: George Time (Solomon Islands)

22 June 2016 Friendly	New Caledonia	1–2	Malaysia	Nouméa, New Caledonia
19:15 UTC+11	Saïko 20'	Report (FAM); Report (goal.com)	Amirul 48'; Baddrol 54'	Stadium: Stade Numa-Daly Magenta; Referee: Mederic Lacour (New Caledonia)

26 June 2016 Friendly	Fiji	1–1	Malaysia	Nadi, Fiji
14:00 UTC+12	Krishna 72'	Report (FAM); Report (goal.com)	Amri 41'	Stadium: Prince Charles Park; Referee: George Time (Solomon Islands)

6 September 2016 Friendly	Indonesia	3–0	Malaysia	Surabaya, Indonesia
UTC+7				Stadium: Gelora Bung Tomo Stadium

7 October 2016 Friendly	Singapore	0–0	Malaysia	Singapore
UTC+7

11 October 2016 Friendly	Malaysia	1–1	Afghanistan	Shah Alam, Malaysia
UTC+8

14 November 2016 Friendly	Malaysia	2–1	Papua New Guinea	Shah Alam, Malaysia
15:00 UTC+08	Hazwan 20'; Amri 46'	Report	Nigel 6'	Stadium: Shah Alam Stadium; Referee: Alongkron Feemuechang (Thailand)

=== Malaysia national under-23 football team ===
==== International Friendlies ====
23 March 2016 Friendly	Malaysia	4–1	Philippines	Tuanku Abdul Rahman Stadium, Paroi, Malaysia
20:45 (UTC+8)	Ariff 18'; Kumaahran 29'; Thanabalan 65'; Farhan 75' (pen.)	Report	Kanayama 73' (pen.)

27 March 2016 Friendly	Malaysia	1–1	Nepal	Tuanku Abdul Rahman Stadium, Paroi, Malaysia
20:45 (UTC+8)

=== Malaysia national under-22 football team ===
==== 2016 Nations Cup ====
3 June 2016 Semi-final	Malaysia	3–0	Singapore	Hang Jebat Stadium, Krubong
20:45 (UTC+8)	Safawi 4'; Syafiq 52'; Shamie 83'	Report		Attendance: 2,000

3 June 2016 Final	Thailand	2–1	Malaysia	Hang Jebat Stadium, Krubong
20:45 (UTC+8)	Worawut 3'; Chenrop 79'	Report	Syamie 35'

==== International Friendlies ====
13 June 2016 Training Match	Yokohama F.C. (Japan)	Cancelled	Malaysia

20 June 2016 Training Match	FC Machida Zelvia (Japan)	3 – 3	Malaysia	Machida, Japan
	Otake 4'; Shigematsu 55'; Nakamura 81'	Report	Arif 7'; Faris 35' (pen.); Jafri 79'	Stadium: Machida Athletic Stadium

22 June 2016 Training Match	Shonan Bellmare (Japan)	1 – 0	Malaysia	Kanagawa, Japan
	Tamura 15' (pen.)	Report		Stadium: Shonan Bellmare Training Ground

30 August 2016 Friendly	Malaysia	0 – 0	Bahrain	Shah Alam, Malaysia
21:00 (UTC+8)		Report		Stadium: Shah Alam Stadium

2 September 2016 Friendly	Malaysia	1 – 2	Bahrain	Shah Alam, Malaysia
16:45 (UTC+8)	Kumaahran 54'	Report	Hazza 53', 90' (pen.)	Stadium: UiTM Stadium; Referee: Muhammad Nazmi Nasarruddin (Malaysia)

6 October 2016 Friendly	Malaysia	2–0	Brunei	Paroi, Malaysia
20:45 (UTC+8)				Stadium: Tuanku Abdul Rahman Stadium

8 October 2016 Friendly	Malaysia	1–0	Brunei	Paroi, Malaysia
17:15 (UTC+8)				Stadium: Tuanku Abdul Rahman Stadium

=== Malaysia national under-19 football team ===
==== 2016 AFF U-19 Youth Championship ====
- All times are local, ICT (UTC+7).

Pos	Team	Pld	W	D	L	GF	GA	GD	Pts	Qualification
1	Vietnam (H)	4	3	1	0	11	5	+6	10	Knockout stage
2	Timor-Leste	4	3	0	1	8	7	+1	9	Knockout stage
3	Malaysia	4	2	0	2	10	7	+3	6	
4	Singapore	4	1	1	2	3	5	−2	4	
5	Philippines	4	0	0	4	5	13	−8	0	

Source: AFF
(H) Hosts

13 September 2016 Group stage	Philippines	0–5	Malaysia	Hàng Đẫy Stadium, Hanoi
16:00		Report	M. Kamarudin 38'; M. Jafri 41'; M. Amirul 70' (pen.); Kutty Abba 79'; Rusalan 90'	Referee: Xaypaseuth Phongsanit (Laos)

15 September 2016 Group stage	Malaysia	2–1	Singapore	Hàng Đẫy Stadium, Hanoi
16:00	Zarulizwan Mazlan 16'; M. Jafri 45+1'	Report	Syahrul Sazali 82'

17 September 2016 Group stage	Timor-Leste	3–2	Malaysia	Vietnam Youth Training Centre, Hanoi
16:00	F. Alves 32', 36'; G. Alberto 71'	Report	M. Jafri 45'; M. Ashraf 57'	Attendance: 200; Referee: Thoriq Al Katiri (Indonesia)

19 September 2016 Group stage	Malaysia	1–3	Vietnam	Hàng Đẫy Stadium, Hanoi
19:00	M. Jafri 90'	Report	Khánh 13'; Hậu 81'; Linh 90'	Attendance: 550; Referee: Khin Maung Win (Myanmar)

=== Malaysia national under-16 football team ===
==== 2016 AIFF Youth Cup ====
Pos	Team	Pld	W	D	L	GF	GA	GD	Pts	Qualification
1	United States	4	2	2	0	7	2	+5	8	Final
2	South Korea	4	1	3	0	5	2	+3	6	Final
3	Tanzania	4	1	3	0	8	6	+2	6	Third place play-off
4	Malaysia	4	0	2	2	5	9	−4	2	Third place play-off
5	India	4	0	2	2	3	9	−6	2	

Updated to match(es) played on 15 May 2016. Source: AIFF

15 May 2016 2016 AIFF Youth Cup (group stage)	India	2 – 2	Malaysia	Goa, India
22:30 (UTC+8)	Komal Thatal 82'; Boris Singh 90+4'	Report	Alif Safwan 44'; Arif Syaqirin 79' (pen.)	Stadium: Tilak Maidan Stadium; Referee: R. Venkatesh (India)

17 May 2016 2016 AIFF Youth Cup (group stage)	Malaysia	0 – 3	South Korea	Goa, India
22:30 (UTC+8)		Report	Kim Chae-Woon 24'; Park Jung-In 34'; Joung Sung-June 90+4'	Stadium: Tilak Maidan Stadium; Referee: Marx Johndonbok Nongsiej (India)

21 May 2016 2016 AIFF Youth Cup (group stage)	Tanzania	2 – 2	Malaysia	Goa, India
22:30 (UTC+8)	Asad Juma 31'; Yohana Mkomola 59'	Report	Arif Syaqirin 62'; Najmi Idham 68'	Stadium: Tilak Maidan Stadium; Referee: R. Venkatesh (India)

23 May 2016 2016 AIFF Youth Cup (group stage)	Malaysia	1 – 2	United States	Goa, India
18:30 (UTC+8)	Zainul Ariffin 85'	Report	Joshua Thomas 17' (pen.), 45+2'	Stadium: Tilak Maidan Stadium; Referee: Tejas Visvasrao Nagvenkar (India)

25 May 2016 2016 AIFF Youth Cup (third-place play-off)	Tanzania	3 – 0	Malaysia	Goa, India
18:30 (UTC+8)	Rashid Abdallah 13'; Shabani Zuberi 42'; Muhsini Makame 45+5'	Report		Stadium: Tilak Maidan Stadium; Referee: R. Venkatesh (India)

==== 2016 AFF U-16 Youth Championship ====
Pos	Team	Pld	W	D	L	GF	GA	GD	Pts	Qualification
1	Vietnam	5	4	1	0	17	4	+13	13	Knockout stage
2	Australia	5	3	1	1	21	7	+14	10	Knockout stage
3	Myanmar	5	2	1	2	9	8	+1	7	
4	Malaysia	5	2	1	2	6	12	−6	7	
5	Singapore	5	1	0	4	6	16	−10	3	
6	Philippines	5	0	2	3	6	18	−12	2	

Source: aseanfootball.org

10 July 2016 2016 AFF U-16 Youth Championship (group stage)	Malaysia	0 – 3	Vietnam	Phnom Penh, Cambodia
19:30 (UTC+8)		Report	Khắc Khiêm 6'; Trờng Lờng 68'; Hữu Thắng 90+4'	Stadium: Olympic Stadium; Referee: Vichhika Tuy (Cambodia)

12 July 2016 2016 AFF U-16 Youth Championship (group stage)	Philippines	2 – 2	Malaysia	Phnom Penh, Cambodia
16:30 (UTC+8)	Fidel 34'; Wilson 44'	Report	Alif 30', 46'	Stadium: Olympic Stadium; Referee: Amdillah Zainuddin (Brunei)

14 July 2016 2016 AFF U-16 Youth Championship (group stage)	Singapore	0 – 2	Malaysia	Phnom Penh, Cambodia
16:30 (UTC+8)		Report	Aiman 15'; Izreen 70'	Stadium: Army Stadium; Referee: Tuy Vichhika (Cambodia)

16 July 2016 2016 AFF U-16 Youth Championship (group stage)	Malaysia	1 – 0	Myanmar	Phnom Penh, Cambodia
19:30 (UTC+8)	Nizarruddin 85'	Report		Stadium: Olympic Stadium; Referee: Chanketya Thong (Cambodia)

18 July 2016 2016 AFF U-16 Youth Championship (group stage)	Australia	7 – 1	Malaysia	Phnom Penh, Cambodia
16:30 (UTC+8)	Italiano 4', 83'; Roberts 48', 59', 66', 73'; Brook 64'	Report	Nizarruddin 29'	Stadium: Olympic Stadium; Referee: Warintorn Sassadee (Thailand)

==== 2016 AFC U-16 Championship ====
Pos	Team	Pld	W	D	L	GF	GA	GD	Pts	Qualification
1	Oman	3	1	2	0	4	1	+3	5	Knockout stage
2	Iraq	3	1	2	0	4	3	+1	5	Knockout stage
3	South Korea	3	1	1	1	4	2	+2	4	
4	Malaysia	3	0	1	2	1	7	−6	1	

Source: AFC
Rules for classification: Group stage tiebreakers

16 September 2016 2016 AFC U-16 Championship (group stage)	Malaysia	0 – 3	Oman	Margao, India
21:30 (UTC+8)		Report	Arshad Said 20' (pen.), 78'; Yousuf Al Maliki 63' (pen.)	Stadium: Pandit Jawaharlal Nehru Stadium; Attendance: 341; Referee: Mooud Bonyadifar (Iran)

19 September 2016 2016 AFC U-16 Championship (group stage)	Iraq	1 – 1	Malaysia	Margao, India
18:30 (UTC+8)	Ridha Jalil 43'	Report	Alif Haikal 84'	Stadium: Pandit Jawaharlal Nehru Stadium; Attendance: 46; Referee: Kimura Hiroyuki (Japan)

22 September 2016 2016 AFC U-16 Championship (group stage)	South Korea	3 – 0	Malaysia	Margao, India
22:30 (UTC+8)	Park Jeong-in 4'; Cheon Seong-hoon 14' (pen.); Ko Jun-Hee 84'	Report		Stadium: Pandit Jawaharlal Nehru Stadium; Attendance: 231; Referee: Aziz Asimov (Uzbekistan)

==== International Friendlies ====
9 August 2016 Friendly	Malaysia	0 – 1	Saudi Arabia	Kelana Jaya, Malaysia
17:00 (UTC+8)			Mansur 87'	Stadium: MBPJ Stadium

27 August 2016 Friendly	Malaysia	0 – 1	Saudi Arabia	Negeri Sembilan, Malaysia
17:00 (UTC+8)			Feras 43'	Stadium: USIM Mini Stadium

30 August 2016 Friendly	Malaysia	2 – 3	United Arab Emirates	Negeri Sembilan, Malaysia
17:00 (UTC+8)				Stadium: USIM Mini Stadium

10 September 2016 Friendly	Malaysia	1 – 2	Yemen	Negeri Sembilan, Malaysia
17:00 (UTC+8)				Stadium: USIM Mini Stadium

== League season ==
=== Super League ===
Pos	Team	Pld	W	D	L	GF	GA	GD	Pts	Qualification or relegation
1	Johor Darul Ta'zim (C)	22	18	4	0	56	14	+42	58	Qualification to AFC Champions League preliminary round 2 (Note: Also qualification to AFC Cup group stage if failed to qualify for the AFC Champions League group stage.)
2	Felda United	22	13	4	5	47	27	+20	43	Qualification to AFC Cup group stage (Note: Since the winners of 2016 Piala FA, Johor Darul Ta'zim, currently qualify for AFC Champions League based on their league position, the spot awarded to the Piala FA winner (AFC Cup group stage) would be passed to the next best team in the table (in this case, the second-placed team).)
3	Kedah	22	11	7	4	30	26	+4	37 (Note: Kedah Football Association (Kedah FA) has been found guilty of putting the suspended player during the match against Pahang on August 3, 2016. Therefore, the Football Association of Malaysia (FAM) has been awarded 3 points for Pahang and Kedah sentenced deducted 3 points for the incident.)	
4	Kelantan	22	7	8	7	37	33	+4	29	
5	Selangor	22	7	7	8	28	27	+1	28	
6	Perak	22	7	7	8	29	30	−1	28	
7	T–Team	22	7	6	9	30	34	−4	27	
8	Sarawak	22	6	6	10	32	40	−8	24	
9	Pahang	22	5	6	11	22	41	−19	24 (Note: Pahang has been awarded 3 points free from the Football Association of Malaysia (FAM) after offenses committed by the Football Association of Kedah (Kedah FA) putting the suspended player during the match against Pahang on August 3, 2016.)	
10	Penang	22	5	7	10	32	37	−5	22	
11	PDRM (R)	22	5	6	11	21	32	−11	21	Relegation to Liga Premier
12	Terengganu (R)	22	5	4	13	21	44	−23	19	Relegation to Liga Premier

Source: SPMB Football Association of Malaysia, Football Malaysia LLP
Rules for classification: 1) Points; 2) Goal difference; 3) Number of goals scored; 3) Number of goals against.
(C) Champions; (R) Relegated

=== Premier League ===
Pos	Team	Pld	W	D	L	GF	GA	GD	Pts	Promotion or relegation
1	Melaka United (C, P)	22	15	5	2	48	25	+23	50	Promotion to Super League
2	PKNS (P)	22	15	3	4	49	25	+24	48	Promotion to Super League
3	Johor Darul Ta'zim II	22	13	4	5	44	26	+18	43	
4	Negeri Sembilan	22	9	8	5	40	26	+14	35	
5	Kuala Lumpur	22	9	8	5	38	32	+6	35	
6	Perlis	22	10	4	8	38	32	+6	34	
7	DRB-HICOM	22	8	5	9	30	29	+1	29	
8	Kuantan	22	7	7	8	39	43	−4	28	
9	Sabah	22	5	5	12	26	41	−15	20	
10	UiTM	22	4	4	14	24	44	−20	16	
11	ATM	22	4	3	15	24	62	−38	15	
12	Sime Darby (R)	22	2	6	14	26	41	−15	12	Relegation to FAM League

Source: FAM Official Site, Football Malaysia LLP
Rules for classification: 1) Points; 2) Goal difference; 3) Number of goals scored; 4) Number of goals against
(C) Champions; (P) Promoted; (R) Relegated

=== FAM Cup ===
==== Group A ====
Pos	Team	Pld	W	D	L	GF	GA	GD	Pts	Promotion or qualification
1	MISC-MIFA (C, P)	16	11	3	2	31	12	+19	36	Advance to knock-out stage
2	FELCRA	16	10	3	3	19	7	+12	33	Advance to knock-out stage
3	AirAsia Allstar	16	8	6	2	19	7	+12	30	Advance to knock-out stage
4	Sungai Ara	16	9	2	5	20	14	+6	29	Advance to knock-out stage & Withdrew from FAM League
5	Shahzan Muda	16	7	4	5	23	16	+7	25	
6	Penjara	16	2	7	7	13	23	−10	13	
7	Megah Murni	16	3	4	9	13	26	−13	13	Withdrew from FAM League
8	Ipoh	16	3	2	11	16	32	−16	11	Withdrew from FAM League
9	DYS F.C.	16	2	3	11	12	28	−16	9	Withdrew from FAM League

Source: FAM Official Site
Rules for classification: 1) Points; 2) Goal difference; 3) Number of goals scored
(C) Champions; (P) Promoted

==== Group B ====
Pos	Team	Pld	W	D	L	GF	GA	GD	Pts	Promotion or qualification
1	PKNP (P)	14	9	3	2	26	9	+17	30	Advance to knock-out stage
2	MOF	14	8	3	3	25	12	+13	27	Advance to knock-out stage
3	SAMB	14	8	3	3	21	14	+7	27	Advance to knock-out stage
4	KDMM	14	5	4	5	11	14	−3	19	Advance to knock-out stage
5	UKM	14	4	4	6	13	16	−3	16	
6	Hanelang	14	3	4	7	12	19	−7	13	
7	PB Melayu Malaysia	14	3	3	8	12	25	−13	12	
8	MPKB-BRI U-Bes	14	2	4	8	12	23	−11	10	
9	TNB Kilat	0	0	0	0	0	0	0	0	Withdraw

Source: FAM Official Site
Rules for classification: 1) Points; 2) Goal difference; 3) Number of goals scored
(P) Promoted

==== Final ====
===== First leg =====
20 October 2016
20:45 (UTC+8)

(Malaysia) MISC-MIFA	1–0	(Perak) PKNP
G. Thipen Raj 89' (pen.)	Report

Shah Alam Stadium
Attendance: 6700
Referee: Mohd Ezanee Mohd Said

===== Second leg =====
27 October 2016
20:45 (UTC+8)

(Perak) PKNP	1–2	(Malaysia) MISC-MIFA
Mazni Hasnan 73'	Report	Yoges Muniandy 5'; Munawwar Ali 67'

Perak Stadium, Ipoh
Attendance: 7000
Referee: Fitri Maskon

== Domestic Cups ==
=== Charity Shield ===
13 February 2016 Charity Shield	Johor Darul Ta'zim	1–1 (7–6 p)	Selangor	Johor Bahru, Johor
	Hariss 45'	Report	Hafiz 60'	Stadium: Larkin Stadium; Attendance: 30,000; Referee: Syed Azhar Syed Kamar
	Penalties
	(penalty scored) Safiq; (penalty missed) Díaz; (penalty scored) Nazrin; (penalty scored) Amirul; (penalty scored) Hariss; (penalty missed) Azamuddin; (penalty scored) António; (penalty scored) Aidil; (penalty scored) Kunanlan		(penalty missed) Olivi; (penalty scored) Wleh; (penalty scored) Veenod; (penalty scored) Hafiz; (penalty scored) Razman; (penalty missed) Gopi; (penalty scored) Shahrom; (penalty scored) Raimi; (penalty missed) Azrif

=== FA Cup ===
==== Final ====
14 May 2016
21:00 (UTC+8)

Johor Darul Ta'zim	2–1	(Selangor) PKNS
Safiq 16' (pen.); Díaz 36'	Report	Guerra 6' (pen.)

Shah Alam Stadium, Shah Alam
Attendance: 75,000
Referee: Syed Azhar Syed Kamar

=== Malaysia Cup ===
30 October 2016
21:00 UTC+8

Kedah	1–1	Selangor
Rizal 52'	Report	Hazwan 60'
Penalties
Smeltz (penalty missed); Seung-Hwan (penalty scored); Farhan (penalty scored); Krasniqi (penalty scored); Baddrol (penalty scored); Amirul (penalty missed); Halim (penalty scored); Rizal Ghazali (penalty scored)	6–5	(penalty scored) Ukah; (penalty scored) Wleh; (penalty missed) Azmi; (penalty scored) Olivi; (penalty scored) Veenod; (penalty missed) Hafiz; (penalty scored) Andik; (penalty missed) Rizal Fahmi

Shah Alam Stadium, Shah Alam, Selangor
Attendance: 79,782
Referee: Mohd Amirul Izwan Yaacob

== Malaysian clubs in Asia ==
=== Johor Darul Ta'zim F.C. ===
==== AFC Champions League ====
===== Qualifying play-off =====
2 February 2016 Preliminary round 2	Muangthong United (Thailand)	0 – 0 (a.e.t.) (3 – 0 p)	(Malaysia) Johor Darul Ta'zim	SCG Stadium, Nonthaburi
19:30 UTC+7				Attendance: 11,446; Referee: Kim Sang-woo
	Penalties
	(penalty scored) Cleiton Silva; (penalty scored) Peerapat Notchaiya; (penalty scored) Sarach Yooyen		(penalty missed) Jorge Pereyra Díaz; (penalty missed) Marcos Antonio; (penalty missed) Hariss Harun

==== AFC Cup ====
===== Group stage =====
Pos	Team	Pld	W	D	L	GF	GA	GD	Pts	Qualification	JDT	BFC	AYE	LAO
1	(Malaysia) Johor Darul Ta'zim	6	6	0	0	21	3	+18	18	Knockout stage	—	3–0	8–1	3–0
2	(India) Bengaluru	6	3	0	3	9	10	−1	9	Knockout stage	0–1	—	5–3	2–1
3	(Myanmar) Ayeyawady United	6	2	0	4	12	20	−8	6		1–2	0–1	—	4–2
4	(Laos) Lao Toyota	6	1	0	5	8	17	−9	3		1–4	2–1	2–3	—

Source: AFC
Rules for classification: Group stage tiebreakers

24 February 2016 Group stage	Johor Darul Ta'zim (Malaysia)	8–1	(Myanmar) Ayeyawady United	Larkin Stadium, Johor Bahru
21:00 UTC+8	Safiq 5', 49', 63'; Díaz 14'; António 31'; Lucero 82', 87'; Aidil 89'	Report	Zaw 7'	Attendance: 11,560; Referee: Ng Chiu Kok (Hong Kong)

9 March 2016 Group stage	Bengaluru FC (India)	0–1	(Malaysia) Johor Darul Ta'zim	Sree Kanteerava Stadium, Bengaluru
18:00 UTC+7		Report	Safiq 55'	Attendance: 2,792; Referee: Hussein Abo Yehia (Lebanon)

16 March 2016 Group stage	Johor Darul Ta'zim (Malaysia)	3–0	(Laos) Lao Toyota	Larkin Stadium, Johor Bahru
21:00 UTC+8	Safiq 62' (pen.), 74' (pen.); Amri 90+2'			Attendance: 16,860; Referee: Hanna Hattab (Syria)

13 April 2016 Group stage	Lao Toyota (Laos)	1–4	(Malaysia) Johor Darul Ta'zim	New Laos National Stadium, Vientiane
18:00 UTC+7	Syvilay 42'	Report	Safee 47'; Fadhli 65'; Amri 78'; Díaz 82'	Attendance: 200; Referee: Çarymyrat Gurbanow (Turkmenistan)

27 April 2016 Group stage	Ayeyawady United (Myanmar)	1–2	(Malaysia) Johor Darul Ta'zim	Thuwunna Stadium, Yangon
	Thiha Zaw 27'	Report	Amirul Hadi 31'; Safee 87'	Attendance: 207; Referee: Khurram Shahzad (Pakistan)

11 May 2016 Group stage	Johor Darul Ta'zim (Malaysia)	3–0	(India) Bengaluru FC	Larkin Stadium, Johor Bahru
21:00 UTC+8	Safiq 70'; Safee 78'; Shakir 90+1' (pen.)	Report		Attendance: 6,545; Referee: Turki Al-Khudhayr (Saudi Arabia)

===== Knock-out stage =====
25 May 2016 Round of 16	Johor Darul Ta'zim (Malaysia)	7–2	(Philippines) Kaya	Larkin Stadium, Johor Bahru
20:45 UTC+8	Lucero 14', 54', 70'; Díaz 23' (pen.); Azamuddin 33', 40'; Mahali 69'	Report	Porteria 53'; Ugarte 88'	Attendance: 17,322; Referee: Fahad Al-Marri (Qatar)

13 September 2016 Quarter-finals (1st leg)	South China (Hong Kong)	1–1	(Malaysia) Johor Darul Ta'zim	Mong Kok Stadium, Hong Kong
20:00 UTC+8		Report

20 September 2016 Quarter-finals (2nd leg)	Johor Darul Ta'zim (Malaysia)	2–1	(Hong Kong) South China	Larkin Stadium, Johor Bahru
20:45 UTC+8

28 September 2016 Semi-finals (1st leg)	Johor Darul Ta'zim (Malaysia)	1–1	(India) Bengaluru FC	Larkin Stadium, Johor Bahru
20:45 UTC+8	Díaz 52'	Report	Lyngdoh 56'	Attendance: 18,000; Referee: Adham Makhadmeh (Jordan)

19 October 2016 Semi-finals (2nd leg)	Bengaluru FC (India)	3–1	(Malaysia) Johor Darul Ta'zim	Sree Kanteerava Stadium, Bengaluru
19:00 UTC+5:30	Chhetri 41', 67'; Juanan 76'	Report	Safiq 11'	Attendance: 21,379; Referee: Ali Abdulnabi (Bahrain)

=== Selangor FA ===
==== AFC Cup ====
===== Group stage =====
Pos	Team	Pld	W	D	L	GF	GA	GD	Pts	Qualification	CER	TAM	SEL	SJD
1	(Philippines) Ceres	6	3	3	0	12	4	+8	12	Knockout stage	—	2–1	2–2	5–0
2	(Singapore) Tampines Rovers	6	3	1	2	10	6	+4	10	Knockout stage	1–1	—	1–0	4–0
3	(Malaysia) Selangor	6	2	2	2	8	8	0	8		0–0	0–1	—	2–1
4	(Bangladesh) Sheikh Jamal Dhanmondi	6	1	0	5	7	19	−12	3		0–2	3–2	3–4	—

Source: AFC
Rules for classification: Group stage tiebreakers

23 February 2016 Group stage	Ceres (Philippines)	2–2	(Malaysia) Selangor	Panaad Park and Stadium, Bacolod
	Schröck 18'; Gallardo 87'	Report	Olivi 34'; Hafiz 60'	Attendance: 8,000; Referee: Wang Di (China)

8 March 2016 Group stage	Selangor (Malaysia)	0–1	(Singapore) Tampines Rovers	Selayang Stadium, Selangor
		Report	Fazrul 26'	Attendance: 5,985; Referee: Khamis Al-Kuwari (Qatar)

15 March 2016 Group stage	Sheikh Jamal Dhanmondi (Bangladesh)	3–4	(Malaysia) Selangor	Bangabandhu National Stadium, Dhaka
18:30 UTC+6	Darboe 29'; Onuoha 65'; Anselme 66'	Report	Wleh 39'; Gopinathan 53'; Olivi 70', 83'	Attendance: 550; Referee: Nivon Robesh Gamini (Sri Lanka)

12 April 2016 Group stage	Selangor (Malaysia)	2–1	(Bangladesh) Sheikh Jamal Dhanmondi	Selayang Stadium, Selangor
20:45 UTC+8	Hazwan 16'; Wleh 89'	Report	Darboe 35'	Attendance: 2,487; Referee: Masaaki Toma (Japan)

26 April 2016 Group stage	Selangor (Malaysia)	0–0	(Philippines) Ceres	Selayang Stadium, Selangor
20:45 UTC+8		Report		Attendance: 1,950; Referee: Omar Al-Yaqoubi (Oman)

10 May 2016 Group stage	Tampines Rovers (Singapore)	1–0	(Malaysia) Selangor	National Stadium, Singapore
19:00 UTC+8	Yasir 31'	Report		Attendance: 11,875; Referee: Jameel Abdulhusin (Bahrain)

== Coaching changes ==
=== Malaysia national football team ===
Outgoing Head Coach	Manner of departure	Date of vacancy	Incoming Head Coach	Date of appointment
(Malaysia) Dollah Salleh	Resigned	9 September 2015	(Malaysia) Ong Kim Swee	18 January 2016

=== Malaysia Super League ===
Team	Outgoing Head Coach	Manner of departure	Date of vacancy	Incoming Head Coach	Date of appointment
Kelantan	(Malaysia) Zahasmi Ismail	End of contract	29 November 2015	(Malaysia) K. Devan	5 December 2015
Selangor	(Australia) Mehmet Durakovic	End of contract	12 December 2015	(Malaysia) Zainal Abidin Hassan	31 December 2015
Pahang	(Malaysia) Zainal Abidin Hassan	End of contract	15 December 2015	(Malaysia) Ahmad Shaharuddin Rosdi	15 December 2015
T-Team	(Croatia) Tomislav Steinbruckner	End of contract	30 November 2015	(Indonesia) Rahmad Darmawan	8 December 2015
Terengganu	(Malaysia) Ahmad Yusoff	Sacked	23 February 2016		
Pahang	(Malaysia) Ahmad Shaharuddin Rosdi	Resign	12 March 2016	(Malaysia) Razip Ismail	17 March 2016

=== Malaysia Premier League ===
Team	Outgoing manager	Manner of departure	Date of vacancy	Incoming manager	Date of appointment
Negeri Sembilan	(Malaysia) K. Devan	Sacked	26 August 2015	(Australia) Gary Phillips	24 November 2015
Perlis	(Malaysia) Yusri Che Lah	Resigned	15 October 2015	(Malaysia) Dollah Salleh	21 November 2015
UiTM	(Malaysia) Azuan Zain	End of contract	25 October 2015	(Malaysia) Raja Isa Raja Akram Shah	28 October 2015
Sime Darby	(Malaysia) Ismail Zakaria	End of contract	31 October 2015	(Malaysia) Abdul Ghani Malik	1 November 2015
Kuala Lumpur	(Malaysia) Tam Siew Seng	End of contract	31 October 2015	(Malaysia) Ismail Zakaria	25 December 2015
Sabah	(Malaysia) Azraai Khor Abdullah	Sacked	6 November 2015	(Croatia) Vjeran Simunić	7 December 2015
Johor DT II	(Croatia) Nenad Bacina	Resigned	14 December 2015	(Mexico) Benjamin Mora	14 December 2015
