= 2016 AFC Cup group stage =

Stage of the 2016 AFC Cup football competition

The 2016 AFC Cup group stage was played from 23 February to 11 May 2016. A total of 32 teams competed in the group stage to decide the 16 places in the knockout stage of the 2016 AFC Cup.

== Draw ==
The draw for the group stage was held on 10 December 2015, 15:00 MYT (UTC+8), at the Petaling Jaya Hilton Hotel in Kuala Lumpur, Malaysia. The 32 teams were drawn into eight groups of four. Teams from the same association could not be drawn into the same group.

The seeding of each team in the draw was determined by their association and their qualifying position within their association. The mechanism of the draw was as follows:

- For the West Zone, a draw was held for the three associations with two direct entrants (Iraq, Jordan, Oman) to determine the seeds 1 placed in order for Groups A, B and C. The remaining teams were then allocated to the groups according to the rules set by AFC.
- For the East Zone, a draw was held for the seven associations with two direct entrants (Hong Kong, Myanmar, Malaysia, India, Singapore, Maldives, Philippines) to determine the four associations occupying seeds 1 and 2, with seeds 1 placed in order for Groups E, F, G and H, and the three associations occupying seeds 3 and 4, with seeds 3 placed in order for Groups E, F and G. The remaining teams were then allocated to the groups according to the rules set by AFC.

The following 32 teams (16 from West Zone, 16 from East Zone) entered into the group-stage draw, which included the 28 direct entrants and the four winners of the qualifying play-off, whose identity were not known at the time of the draw.

Zone	Seed 1	Seed 2	Seed 3	Seed 4
West Zone (Groups A–D)	(Iraq) Naft Al-Wasat	(Iraq) Al-Quwa Al-Jawiya	(Syria) Al-Jaish	(Bahrain) Al-Hidd (Winner Play-off 1)
West Zone (Groups A–D)	(Jordan) Al-Wehdat	(Jordan) Al-Faisaly	(Palestine) Shabab Al-Dhahiriya	(Lebanon) Tripoli (Winner Play-off 2)
West Zone (Groups A–D)	(Oman) Al-Orouba	(Oman) Fanja	(Tajikistan) Istiklol	(Syria) Al-Wahda (Winner Play-off 3)
West Zone (Groups A–D)	(Bahrain) Al-Muharraq	(Lebanon) Al-Ahed	(Turkmenistan) Altyn Asyr	(Palestine) Ahli Al-Khaleel (Winner Play-off 4)
East Zone (Groups E–H)	(Hong Kong) Kitchee	(Hong Kong) South China	(Myanmar) Yangon United	(Myanmar) Ayeyawady United
East Zone (Groups E–H)	(Malaysia) Johor Darul Ta'zim	(Malaysia) Selangor	(Maldives) New Radiant	(Maldives) Maziya
East Zone (Groups E–H)	(India) Mohun Bagan	(India) Bengaluru	(Philippines) Ceres	(Philippines) Kaya
East Zone (Groups E–H)	(Singapore) Tampines Rovers	(Singapore) Balestier Khalsa	(Laos) Lao Toyota	(Bangladesh) Sheikh Jamal Dhanmondi (Winner qualifying round Group B)

Notes

1. ^{†} Teams played in the 2016 AFC Champions League qualifying play-off, but failed to advance to the AFC Champions League group stage (had they advanced to the AFC Champions League group stage, they would have been replaced in the AFC Cup group stage by another team from the same association).
2. ^{‡} Sheikh Jamal Dhanmondi advanced directly to the group stage due to lack of teams in the East Zone.

== Format ==
In the group stage, each group was played on a home-and-away round-robin basis. The winners and runners-up of each group advanced to the round of 16.

=== Tiebreakers ===
The teams were ranked according to points (3 points for a win, 1 point for a draw, 0 points for a loss). If tied on points, tiebreakers would be applied in the following order (Regulations Article 11.5):

1. Greater number of points obtained in the group matches between the teams concerned;
2. Goal difference resulting from the group matches between the teams concerned;
3. Greater number of goals scored in the group matches between the teams concerned;
4. Greater number of away goals scored in the group matches between the teams concerned;
5. If, after applying criteria 1 to 4, teams still have an equal ranking, criteria 1 to 4 are reapplied exclusively to the matches between the teams in question to determine their final rankings. If this procedure does not lead to a decision, criteria 6 to 10 apply;
6. Goal difference in all the group matches;
7. Greater number of goals scored in all the group matches;
8. Penalty shoot-out if only two teams are involved and they are both on the field of play;
9. Fewer score calculated according to the number of yellow and red cards received in the group matches (1 point for a single yellow card, 3 points for a red card as a consequence of two yellow cards, 3 points for a direct red card, 4 points for a yellow card followed by a direct red card);
10. Team who belongs to the member association with the higher AFC ranking.

== Schedule ==
The schedule of each matchday was as follows.

Matchday	Dates	Matches
Matchday 1	23–24 February 2016	Team 1 vs. Team 4, Team 3 vs. Team 2
Matchday 2	8–9 March 2016	Team 4 vs. Team 3, Team 2 vs. Team 1
Matchday 3	15–16 March 2016	Team 4 vs. Team 2, Team 1 vs. Team 3
Matchday 4	12–13 April 2016	Team 2 vs. Team 4, Team 3 vs. Team 1
Matchday 5	26–27 April 2016	Team 4 vs. Team 1, Team 2 vs. Team 3
Matchday 6	10–11 May 2016	Team 1 vs. Team 2, Team 3 vs. Team 4

== Groups ==
=== Group A ===
Pos	Team	Pld	W	D	L	GF	GA	GD	Pts	Qualification	AHE	WEH	HID	ALT
1	(Lebanon) Al-Ahed	6	4	0	2	14	9	+5	12	Knockout stage	—	3–2	1–0	3–0
2	(Jordan) Al-Wehdat	6	2	2	2	10	12	−2	8	Knockout stage	3–2	—	2–0	1–1
3	(Bahrain) Al-Hidd	6	2	1	3	11	12	−1	7		2–5	6–2	—	1–1
4	(Turkmenistan) Altyn Asyr	6	1	3	2	5	7	−2	6		2–0	0–0	1–2	—

Source: AFC
Rules for classification: Group stage tiebreakers
23 February 2016
17:00 UTC+5

Altyn Asyr (Turkmenistan)	2–0	(Lebanon) Al-Ahed
Mansour 57' (o.g.); Gurbani 74'	Report

Ashgabat Stadium, Ashgabat
Attendance: 8,000
Referee: Kim Sang-woo (South Korea)
23 February 2016
14:30 UTC+2

Al-Wehdat (Jordan)	2–0	(Bahrain) Al-Hidd
Wagsley 35'; Abu Kabeer 55'	Report

Amman International Stadium, Amman
Attendance: 6,000
Referee: Timur Faizullin (Kyrgyzstan)

8 March 2016
15:00 UTC+2

Al-Ahed (Lebanon)	3–2	(Jordan) Al-Wehdat
Dramé 31'; Zreik 74'; Mansour 88' (pen.)	Report	Wagsley 36'; Faisal 85'

Saida Municipal Stadium, Saida
Attendance: 600
Referee: Omar Al-Yaqoubi (Oman)
8 March 2016
18:30 UTC+3

Al-Hidd (Bahrain)	1–1	(Turkmenistan) Altyn Asyr
Hasan 78'	Report	Geldiýew 69'

Bahrain National Stadium, Riffa
Attendance: 100
Referee: Jansen Foo (Singapore)

15 March 2016
14:30 UTC+2

Al-Wehdat (Jordan)	1–1	(Turkmenistan) Altyn Asyr
Wagsley 15'	Report	Gurbani 2'

Amman International Stadium, Amman
Attendance: 4,000
Referee: Marai Al-Awaji (Saudi Arabia)
15 March 2016
18:30 UTC+3

Al-Hidd (Bahrain)	2–5	(Lebanon) Al-Ahed
Al Daoud 52'; Al Khattal 59'	Report	Chaito 4'; Zreik 16'; Dramé 61', 74'; Iguma 85'

Bahrain National Stadium, Riffa
Attendance: 300
Referee: Sivakorn Pu-udom (Thailand)

12 April 2016
15:00 UTC+3

Al-Ahed (Lebanon)	1–0	(Bahrain) Al-Hidd
Dramé 60'	Report

Saida Municipal Stadium, Saida
Attendance: 1,035
Referee: Mohd Nafeez Abdul Wahab (Malaysia)
12 April 2016
17:00 UTC+5

Altyn Asyr (Turkmenistan)	0–0	(Jordan) Al-Wehdat
	Report

Köpetdag Stadium, Ashgabat
Attendance: 16,500
Referee: Mohsen Torky (Iran)

26 April 2016
15:00 UTC+3

Al-Ahed (Lebanon)	3–0	(Turkmenistan) Altyn Asyr
Atwi 28'; Chaito 36'; Mansour 45'	Report

Saida Municipal Stadium, Saida
Attendance: 700
Referee: Nivon Robesh Gamini (Sri Lanka)
26 April 2016
18:50 UTC+3

Al-Hidd (Bahrain)	6–2	(Jordan) Al-Wehdat
Agba 6', 45+1'; Adnan 49', 60', 64'; Salman 83' (pen.)	Report	Wagsley 18'; Deeb 53'

Bahrain National Stadium, Riffa
Attendance: 550
Referee: Masoud Tufayelieh (Syria)

10 May 2016
16:00 UTC+3

Al-Wehdat (Jordan)	3–2	(Lebanon) Al-Ahed
Hisham 22'; Mustafa 32'; Faisal 87'	Report	Haidar 3'; Zreik 83'

Amman International Stadium, Amman
Attendance: 4,192
Referee: Wang Di (China)
10 May 2016
18:00 UTC+5

Altyn Asyr (Turkmenistan)	1–2	(Bahrain) Al-Hidd
Muhadow 58'	Report	Al-Khattal 75'; Agba 76'

Köpetdag Stadium, Ashgabat
Attendance: 18,300
Referee: Ng Chiu Kok (Hong Kong)

=== Group B ===
Pos	Team	Pld	W	D	L	GF	GA	GD	Pts	Qualification	NAF	FAI	TRI	IST
1	(Iraq) Naft Al-Wasat	6	5	0	1	9	3	+6	15	Knockout stage	—	1–0	1–0	2–0
2	(Jordan) Al-Faisaly	6	3	2	1	10	6	+4	11	Knockout stage	2–1	—	3–1	4–2
3	(Lebanon) Tripoli	6	2	1	3	8	10	−2	7		1–3	1–1	—	2–1
4	(Tajikistan) Istiklol	6	0	1	5	4	12	−8	1		0–1	0–0	1–3	—

Source: AFC
Rules for classification: Group stage tiebreakers
23 February 2016
16:00 UTC+5

Istiklol (Tajikistan)	0–0	(Jordan) Al-Faisaly
	Report

Pamir Stadium, Dushanbe
Attendance: 8,500
Referee: Võ Minh Trí (Vietnam)
23 February 2016
15:00 UTC+3:30

Naft Al-Wasat (Iraq)	1–0	(Lebanon) Tripoli
Waleed 90+2'	Report

PAS Stadium, Tehran (Iran) (Note: Teams from Iraq were not allowed to host their home matches in their country due to security concerns.)
Attendance: 150
Referee: Sivakorn Pu-udom (Thailand)

8 March 2016
14:30 UTC+2

Al-Faisaly (Jordan)	2–1	(Iraq) Naft Al-Wasat
Al-Bakhit 55'; Al-Ajalin 78'	Report	Waleed 90'

Amman International Stadium, Amman
Attendance: 3,000
Referee: Yaqoob Abdul Baki (Oman)
8 March 2016
15:00 UTC+2

Tripoli (Lebanon)	2–1	(Tajikistan) Istiklol
Yusif 58'; Fattouh 87'	Report	Kablash 55'

Tripoli Municipal Stadium, Tripoli
Attendance: 4,000
Referee: Çarymyrat Kurbanow (Turkmenistan)

15 March 2016
15:00 UTC+3:30

Naft Al-Wasat (Iraq)	2–0	(Tajikistan) Istiklol
Mohammed 45+1'; Mardikian 71'	Report

PAS Stadium, Tehran (Iran)
Attendance: 150
Referee: Sukhbir Singh (Singapore)
15 March 2016
15:00 UTC+2

Tripoli (Lebanon)	1–1	(Jordan) Al-Faisaly
Al Mal 45'	Report	Al-Jada 84'

Tripoli Municipal Stadium, Tripoli
Attendance: 4,500
Referee: Mooud Bonyadifar (Iran)

12 April 2016
15:30 UTC+3

Al-Faisaly (Jordan)	3–1	(Lebanon) Tripoli
Abdel-Rahman 31'; Nahar 33'; Al-Rawashdeh 43'	Report	Al Mal 78'

Amman International Stadium, Amman
Attendance: 1,910
Referee: Jansen Foo (Singapore)
12 April 2016
19:00 UTC+5

Istiklol (Tajikistan)	0–1	(Iraq) Naft Al-Wasat
	Report	Mohammed 90+2'

Pamir Stadium, Dushanbe
Attendance: 8,000
Referee: Ammar Mahfoodh (Bahrain)

26 April 2016
14:30 UTC+3

Al-Faisaly (Jordan)	4–2	(Tajikistan) Istiklol
Bani Attiah 33', 86'; Al-Rifai 38'; Al-Bakhit 59'	Report	Kablash 69'; Umarbayev 78'

Amman International Stadium, Amman
Attendance: 1,500
Referee: Marai Al-Awaji (Saudi Arabia)
26 April 2016
16:00 UTC+3

Tripoli (Lebanon)	1–3	(Iraq) Naft Al-Wasat
Yusif 78'	Report	Ali 8' (o.g.); Waleed 45+4'; Karim 90+1'

Tripoli Municipal Stadium, Tripoli
Attendance: 3,000
Referee: Kim Hee-gon (South Korea)

10 May 2016
18:30 UTC+4:30

Naft Al-Wasat (Iraq)	1–0	(Jordan) Al-Faisaly
Mohammed 52'	Report

PAS Stadium, Tehran (Iran)
Attendance: 30
Referee: Mohd Nafeez Abdul Wahab (Malaysia)
10 May 2016
19:00 UTC+5

Istiklol (Tajikistan)	1–3	(Lebanon) Tripoli
Fatkhuloev 69'	Report	Youssef 46'; Helegbe 82'; Fattouh 86'

Pamir Stadium, Dushanbe
Attendance: 6,000
Referee: Fu Ming (China)

=== Group C ===
Pos	Team	Pld	W	D	L	GF	GA	GD	Pts	Qualification	QUW	WAH	DHA	ORU
1	(Iraq) Al-Quwa Al-Jawiya	6	5	0	1	15	7	+8	15	Knockout stage	—	1–0	4–1	2–1
2	(Syria) Al-Wahda	6	3	0	3	11	9	+2	9	Knockout stage	5–2	—	0–3 (Note: The Al-Wahda v Shabab Al-Dhahiriya match on matchday 2 (9 March 2016) was not played as scheduled. It was awarded 3–0 to Al-Wahda by the AFC Disciplinary Committee on 28 April 2016, as it found Shabab Al-Dhahiriya as the relevant party for causing the cancellation of the match. The decision was reversed and awarded 3–0 to Shabab Al-Dhahiriya by the AFC Appeal Committee on 24 June 2016, as it found Al-Wahda as the relevant party for causing the cancellation of the match.)	2–1
3	(Palestine) Shabab Al-Dhahiriya	6	2	1	3	7	10	−3	7		0–2	0–3 (Note: The Shabab Al-Dhahiriya v Al-Wahda match on matchday 6 (11 May 2016) was not played as scheduled. It was awarded 3–0 to Al-Wahda by the AFC Disciplinary Committee on 13 May 2016, as it found Shabab Al-Dhahiriya as the relevant party for causing the cancellation of the match.)	—	2–0
4	(Oman) Al-Orouba	6	1	1	4	5	12	−7	4		0–4	2–1	1–1	—

Source: AFC
Rules for classification: Group stage tiebreakers
Notes:
24 February 2016
16:00 UTC+2

Shabab Al-Dhahiriya (Palestine)	0–2	(Iraq) Al-Quwa Al-Jawiya
	Report	Ahmad 12', 41'

Dora International Stadium, Hebron
Attendance: 8,000
Referee: Nivon Robesh Gamini (Sri Lanka)
24 February 2016
19:00 UTC+4

Al-Orouba (Oman)	2–1	(Syria) Al-Wahda
Al-Matari 54'; Al-Lawati 89'	Report	Rafe 88'

Sur Sports Complex, Sur
Attendance: 1,500
Referee: Pranjal Banerjee (India)

9 March 2016
14:00 UTC+2

Al-Wahda (Syria)	0–3 Awarded	(Palestine) Shabab Al-Dhahiriya
	Report

Saida Municipal Stadium, Saida (Lebanon) (Note: Teams from Syria were not allowed to host their home matches in their country due to security concerns.)
Referee: Võ Minh Trí (Vietnam)
9 March 2016
19:00 UTC+3

Al-Quwa Al-Jawiya (Iraq)	2–1	(Oman) Al-Orouba
Ahmad 14'; Saeed 66'	Report	Koné 77'

Saoud bin Abdulrahman Stadium, Al Wakrah (Qatar)
Attendance: 50
Referee: Jameel Abdulhusin (Bahrain)

16 March 2016
14:00 UTC+2

Al-Wahda (Syria)	5–2	(Iraq) Al-Quwa Al-Jawiya
Rafe 10', 32', 55', 56'; Omari 63'	Report	Ahmad 59', 80' (pen.)

Saida Municipal Stadium, Saida (Lebanon)
Attendance: 200
Referee: Mohammad Abu Loum (Jordan)
16 March 2016
19:00 UTC+4

Al-Orouba (Oman)	1–1	(Palestine) Shabab Al-Dhahiriya
Al Shibli 67'	Report	Morjan 31'

Sur Sports Complex, Sur
Attendance: 1,000
Referee: Khamis Al-Marri (Qatar)

13 April 2016
17:00 UTC+3

Shabab Al-Dhahiriya (Palestine)	2–0	(Oman) Al-Orouba
Morjan 4'; Fouda 65'	Report

Dora International Stadium, Hebron
Attendance: 800
Referee: Ahmed Al-Ali (Jordan)
13 April 2016
19:00 UTC+3

Al-Quwa Al-Jawiya (Iraq)	1–0	(Syria) Al-Wahda
Ahmad 45+1'	Report

Saoud bin Abdulrahman Stadium, Al Wakrah (Qatar)
Attendance: 250
Referee: Mohammad Abu Loum (Jordan)

27 April 2016
15:00 UTC+3

Al-Wahda (Syria)	2–1	(Oman) Al-Orouba
Rafe 45+2'; Al Nakdali 66' (pen.)	Report	Peters 60'

Saida Municipal Stadium, Saida (Lebanon)
Attendance: 40
Referee: Mooud Bonyadifar (Iran)
27 April 2016
19:00 UTC+3

Al-Quwa Al-Jawiya (Iraq)	4–1	(Palestine) Shabab Al-Dhahiriya
Ahmad 10', 61'; Wahid 34'; Rasan 67'	Report	Thiab 79'

Saoud bin Abdulrahman Stadium, Al Wakrah (Qatar)
Attendance: 200
Referee: Sivakorn Pu-udom (Thailand)

11 May 2016
19:00 UTC+4

Al-Orouba (Oman)	0–4	(Iraq) Al-Quwa Al-Jawiya
	Report	Ahmad 52' (pen.), 56', 78'; Ajan 83'

Sur Sports Complex, Sur
Attendance: 50
Referee: Timur Faizullin (Kyrgyzstan)
11 May 2016
18:00 UTC+3

Shabab Al-Dhahiriya (Palestine)	0–3 Awarded	(Syria) Al-Wahda
	Report

Dora International Stadium, Hebron (Note: The Shabab Al-Dhahiriya v Al-Wahda match was required by the AFC to be played at a neutral venue due to restriction of Syrians entering Palestine. However, Shabab Al-Dhahiriya were unable to secure a neutral venue and the match was forfeited.)
Referee: Aziz Asimov (Uzbekistan)

=== Group D ===
Pos	Team	Pld	W	D	L	GF	GA	GD	Pts	Qualification	MHQ	JAI	KHA	FAN
1	(Bahrain) Al-Muharraq	6	5	1	0	9	3	+6	16	Knockout stage	—	1–0	2–1	1–0
2	(Syria) Al-Jaish	6	3	1	2	5	3	+2	10	Knockout stage	0–2	—	1–0	1–0
3	(Palestine) Ahli Al-Khaleel	6	1	2	3	7	11	−4	5		1–1	0–3 (Note: The Ahli Al-Khaleel v Al-Jaish match on matchday 2 (9 March 2016) was delayed to 3 or 4 May 2016, but was not played as scheduled. It was awarded 3–0 to Al-Jaish by the AFC Disciplinary Committee on 13 May 2016, as it found Ahli Al-Khaleel as the relevant party for causing the cancellation of the match.)	—	2–1
4	(Oman) Fanja	6	0	2	4	5	9	−4	2		1–2	0–0	3–3	—

Source: AFC
Rules for classification: Group stage tiebreakers
Notes:
24 February 2016
19:00 UTC+4

Al-Jaish (Syria)	1–0	(Oman) Fanja
Kalfa 78'	Report

Sultan Qaboos Sports Complex, Muscat (Oman)
Attendance: 500
Referee: Ahmed Al-Ali (Jordan)
24 February 2016
18:20 UTC+3

Al-Muharraq (Bahrain)	2–1	(Palestine) Ahli Al-Khaleel
Showaiter 5'; Abdullatif 23' (pen.)	Report	Wadi 15'

Bahrain National Stadium, Riffa
Attendance: 2,500
Referee: Kim Dae-yong (South Korea)

9 March 2016
15:00 UTC+4

Fanja (Oman)	1–2	(Bahrain) Al-Muharraq
Al-Hosni 30'	Report	Rashid 21'; Kanú 73'

Sultan Qaboos Sports Complex, Muscat
Attendance: 120
Referee: Khamis Al-Marri (Qatar)
9 March 2016 (Note: The Ahli Al-Khaleel v Al-Jaish match was initially postponed due to the Syrians' inability to obtain the necessary entry visas for Jordan. It was required by the AFC to be played on 3 or 4 May 2016 at a neutral venue due to restriction of Syrians entering Palestine. However, Ahli Al-Khaleel were unable to secure a neutral venue and the match was forfeited.)
16:00 UTC+2

Ahli Al-Khaleel (Palestine)	0–3 Awarded	(Syria) Al-Jaish
	Report

Prince Mohammed Stadium, Zarqa (Jordan)
Referee: Fu Ming (China)

16 March 2016
16:00 UTC+2

Ahli Al-Khaleel (Palestine)	2–1	(Oman) Fanja
Wadi 24', 65'	Report	Al-Muqbali 90+2'

Dora International Stadium, Hebron
Attendance: 500
Referee: Timur Faizullin (Kyrgyzstan)
16 March 2016
18:30 UTC+3

Al-Muharraq (Bahrain)	1–0	(Syria) Al-Jaish
Abdullatif 29'	Report

Bahrain National Stadium, Riffa
Attendance: 500
Referee: Jumpei Iida (Japan)

13 April 2016
19:00 UTC+4

Fanja (Oman)	3–3	(Palestine) Ahli Al-Khaleel
Al-Ghassani 15', 33'; Al-Hosni 86'	Report	Maher 4', 62'; Wadi 46'

Al-Seeb Stadium, Seeb
Attendance: 300
Referee: Ammar Al-Jeneibi (United Arab Emirates)
13 April 2016
18:45 UTC+3

Al-Jaish (Syria)	0–2	(Bahrain) Al-Muharraq
	Report	Abdullatif 34'; Gadoyev 47'

Bahrain National Stadium, Riffa (Bahrain)
Attendance: 700
Referee: Aziz Asimov (Uzbekistan)

27 April 2016
17:00 UTC+3

Ahli Al-Khaleel (Palestine)	1–1	(Bahrain) Al-Muharraq
Saleh 60'	Report	Ćatović 32'

Dora International Stadium, Hebron
Attendance: 300
Referee: Rowan Arumughan (India)
27 April 2016
19:00 UTC+4

Fanja (Oman)	0–0	(Syria) Al-Jaish
	Report

Al-Seeb Stadium, Seeb
Attendance: 200
Referee: Hussein Abo Yehia (Lebanon)

11 May 2016
19:00 UTC+3

Al-Muharraq (Bahrain)	1–0	(Oman) Fanja
Ćatović 60'	Report

Bahrain National Stadium, Riffa
Attendance: 200
Referee: Nivon Robesh Gamini (Sri Lanka)
11 May 2016
19:00 UTC+3

Al-Jaish (Syria)	1–0	(Palestine) Ahli Al-Khaleel
Hamdoko 85'	Report

Khalifa Sports City Stadium, Isa Town (Bahrain)
Attendance: 20
Referee: Çarymyrat Kurbanow (Turkmenistan)

=== Group E ===
Pos	Team	Pld	W	D	L	GF	GA	GD	Pts	Qualification	CER	TAM	SEL	SJD
1	(Philippines) Ceres	6	3	3	0	12	4	+8	12	Knockout stage	—	2–1	2–2	5–0
2	(Singapore) Tampines Rovers	6	3	1	2	10	6	+4	10	Knockout stage	1–1	—	1–0	4–0
3	(Malaysia) Selangor	6	2	2	2	8	8	0	8		0–0	0–1	—	2–1
4	(Bangladesh) Sheikh Jamal Dhanmondi	6	1	0	5	7	19	−12	3		0–2	3–2	3–4	—

Source: AFC
Rules for classification: Group stage tiebreakers
23 February 2016
19:00 UTC+8

Ceres (Philippines)	2–2	(Malaysia) Selangor
Schröck 18'; Gallardo 87'	Report	Olivi 34'; Hafiz 60'

Panaad Park and Stadium, Bacolod
Attendance: 8,000
Referee: Wang Di (China)
23 February 2016
19:30 UTC+8

Tampines Rovers (Singapore)	4–0	(Bangladesh) Sheikh Jamal Dhanmondi
Mehmet 2'; Abu Sujad 33'; Yunos 52'; Barman 54' (o.g.)	Report

Jalan Besar Stadium, Singapore
Attendance: 2,378
Referee: Ali Abdulnabi (Bahrain)

8 March 2016
18:00 UTC+6

Sheikh Jamal Dhanmondi (Bangladesh)	0–2	(Philippines) Ceres
	Report	Gallardo 25', 29'

Bangabandhu National Stadium, Dhaka
Attendance: 950
Referee: Khurram Shahzad (Pakistan)
8 March 2016
20:45 UTC+8

Selangor (Malaysia)	0–1	(Singapore) Tampines Rovers
	Report	Fazrul 26'

Majlis Perbandaran Selayang Stadium, Selayang
Attendance: 5,985
Referee: Khamis Al-Kuwari (Qatar)

15 March 2016
19:30 UTC+8

Tampines Rovers (Singapore)	1–1	(Philippines) Ceres
Abu Sujad 69'	Report	Gallardo 88'

Jalan Besar Stadium, Singapore
Attendance: 2,241
Referee: Ho Wai Sing (Hong Kong)
15 March 2016
18:30 UTC+6

Sheikh Jamal Dhanmondi (Bangladesh)	3–4	(Malaysia) Selangor
Darboe 29'; Onuoha 65'; Anselme 66'	Report	Wleh 39'; Gopinathan 53'; Olivi 70', 83'

Bangabandhu National Stadium, Dhaka
Attendance: 550
Referee: Nivon Robesh Gamini (Sri Lanka)

12 April 2016
19:00 UTC+8

Ceres (Philippines)	2–1	(Singapore) Tampines Rovers
Bienve 21' (pen.); Gallardo 36' (pen.)	Report	Mehmet 64'

Panaad Park and Stadium, Bacolod
Attendance: 6,400
Referee: Wang Di (China)
12 April 2016
20:45 UTC+8

Selangor (Malaysia)	2–1	(Bangladesh) Sheikh Jamal Dhanmondi
Hazwan 16'; Wleh 89'	Report	Darboe 35'

Majlis Perbandaran Selayang Stadium, Selayang
Attendance: 2,487
Referee: Masaaki Toma (Japan)

26 April 2016
18:30 UTC+6

Sheikh Jamal Dhanmondi (Bangladesh)	3–2	(Singapore) Tampines Rovers
Darboe 20', 82'; Onuoha 56' (pen.)	Report	Mustafić 44'; Mehmet 70'

Bangabandhu National Stadium, Dhaka
Attendance: 550
Referee: Yaqoob Abdul Baki (Oman)
26 April 2016
20:45 UTC+8

Selangor (Malaysia)	0–0	(Philippines) Ceres
	Report

Majlis Perbandaran Selayang Stadium, Selayang
Attendance: 1,950
Referee: Omar Al-Yaqoubi (Oman)

10 May 2016
19:00 UTC+8

Tampines Rovers (Singapore)	1–0	(Malaysia) Selangor
Hanapi 31'	Report

National Stadium, Singapore
Attendance: 11,875
Referee: Jameel Abdulhusin (Bahrain)
10 May 2016
19:00 UTC+8

Ceres (Philippines)	5–0	(Bangladesh) Sheikh Jamal Dhanmondi
Bienve 7'; Gallardo 9', 57', 64'; Reichelt 70'	Report

Panaad Park and Stadium, Bacolod
Attendance: 8,000
Referee: Yu Ming-hsun (Chinese Taipei)

=== Group F ===
Pos	Team	Pld	W	D	L	GF	GA	GD	Pts	Qualification	KIT	KAY	BAL	NRA
1	(Hong Kong) Kitchee	6	4	1	1	8	1	+7	13	Knockout stage	—	1–0	4–0	0–0
2	(Philippines) Kaya	6	3	1	2	5	2	+3	10	Knockout stage	0–1	—	1–0	1–0
3	(Singapore) Balestier Khalsa	6	2	1	3	6	10	−4	7		1–0	0–3	—	3–0
4	(Maldives) New Radiant	6	0	3	3	2	8	−6	3		0–2	0–0	2–2	—

Source: AFC
Rules for classification: Group stage tiebreakers
23 February 2016
16:00 UTC+5

New Radiant (Maldives)	2–2	(Singapore) Balestier Khalsa
Baree 50'; Rilwan 90+3'	Report	Fazli 36'; Fadhil 69'

National Football Stadium, Malé
Attendance: 900
Referee: Turki Al-Khudhayr (Saudi Arabia)
23 February 2016
20:00 UTC+8

Kitchee (Hong Kong)	1–0	(Philippines) Kaya
Rufino 69' (pen.)	Report

Mong Kok Stadium, Hong Kong
Attendance: 1,996
Referee: Marai Al-Awaji (Saudi Arabia)

8 March 2016
19:30 UTC+8

Kaya (Philippines)	1–0	(Maldives) New Radiant
Porteria 90+4'	Report

Rizal Memorial Stadium, Manila
Attendance: 2,000
Referee: Hiroyuki Kimura (Japan)
8 March 2016
19:30 UTC+8

Balestier Khalsa (Singapore)	1–0	(Hong Kong) Kitchee
Zulkiffli 31'	Report

Jalan Besar Stadium, Singapore
Attendance: 1,048
Referee: Kim Hee-gon (South Korea)

15 March 2016
19:30 UTC+8

Kaya (Philippines)	1–0	(Singapore) Balestier Khalsa
Ugarte 48'	Report

Rizal Memorial Stadium, Manila
Attendance: 1,200
Referee: Rowan Arumughan (India)
15 March 2016
20:00 UTC+8

Kitchee (Hong Kong)	0–0	(Maldives) New Radiant
	Report

Mong Kok Stadium, Hong Kong
Attendance: 1,603
Referee: Yaqoob Abdul Baki (Oman)

12 April 2016
16:00 UTC+5

New Radiant (Maldives)	0–2	(Hong Kong) Kitchee
	Report	Rufino 17', 31'

National Football Stadium, Malé
Attendance: 950
Referee: Pranjal Banerjee (India)
12 April 2016
19:30 UTC+8

Balestier Khalsa (Singapore)	0–3	(Philippines) Kaya
	Report	Osei 15'; Daniels 25'; Clark 73'

Jalan Besar Stadium, Singapore
Attendance: 1,143
Referee: Khamis Al-Kuwari (Qatar)

26 April 2016
15:00 UTC+8

Kaya (Philippines)	0–1	(Hong Kong) Kitchee
	Report	Harima 86'

Rizal Memorial Stadium, Manila
Attendance: 573
Referee: Kim Dae-yong (South Korea)
26 April 2016
19:30 UTC+8

Balestier Khalsa (Singapore)	3–0	(Maldives) New Radiant
Zulkiffli 23'; Jamil 32'; Fadhil 61'	Report

Jalan Besar Stadium, Singapore
Attendance: 706
Referee: Võ Minh Trí (Vietnam)

10 May 2016
20:00 UTC+8

Kitchee (Hong Kong)	4–0	(Singapore) Balestier Khalsa
Jordi 38'; Rufino 50', 61'; Cheng Chin Lung 76'	Report

Mong Kok Stadium, Hong Kong
Attendance: 1,699
Referee: Jumpei Iida (Japan)
10 May 2016
17:00 UTC+5

New Radiant (Maldives)	0–0	(Philippines) Kaya
	Report

National Football Stadium, Malé
Attendance: 870
Referee: Mohammad Abu Loum (Jordan)

=== Group G ===
Pos	Team	Pld	W	D	L	GF	GA	GD	Pts	Qualification	MOH	SCA	YAN	MAZ
1	(India) Mohun Bagan	6	3	2	1	14	9	+5	11	Knockout stage	—	0–3	3–2	5–2
2	(Hong Kong) South China	6	3	0	3	9	9	0	9	Knockout stage	0–4	—	2–1	2–0
3	(Myanmar) Yangon United	6	2	2	2	10	10	0	8		1–1	2–1	—	3–2
4	(Maldives) Maziya	6	1	2	3	8	13	−5	5		1–1	2–1	1–1	—

Source: AFC
Rules for classification: Group stage tiebreakers
24 February 2016
16:00 UTC+6:30

Yangon United (Myanmar)	2–1	(Hong Kong) South China
Kyaw Ko Ko 19'; Fernandes 48'	Report	Griffiths 15'

Thuwunna Stadium, Yangon
Attendance: 1,034
Referee: Jameel Abdulhusin (Bahrain)
24 February 2016
19:00 UTC+5:30

Mohun Bagan (India)	5–2	(Maldives) Maziya
Norde 19'; Lalpekhlua 33', 69'; Glen 35', 72'	Report	Imaz 61'; Gaikwad 77' (o.g.)

Indira Gandhi Athletic Stadium, Guwahati
Attendance: 5,322
Referee: Jumpei Iida (Japan)

9 March 2016
16:00 UTC+5

Maziya (Maldives)	1–1	(Myanmar) Yangon United
Rasheed 64'	Report	Kyaw Ko Ko 87'

National Football Stadium, Malé
Attendance: 937
Referee: Aziz Asimov (Uzbekistan)
9 March 2016
20:00 UTC+8

South China (Hong Kong)	0–4	(India) Mohun Bagan
	Report	Rodrigues 15'; Norde 39'; Glen 44'; Lalpekhlua 83'

Mong Kok Stadium, Hong Kong
Attendance: 1,937
Referee: Masoud Tufayelieh (Syria)

16 March 2016
16:00 UTC+5

Maziya (Maldives)	2–1	(Hong Kong) South China
Rasheed 51'; Cheung Kin Fung 68' (o.g.)	Report	Chan Siu Kwan 36'

National Football Stadium, Malé
Attendance: 900
Referee: Kim Dae-yong (South Korea)
16 March 2016
19:00 UTC+5:30

Mohun Bagan (India)	3–2	(Myanmar) Yangon United
Norde 10'; Lalpekhlua 21', 66'	Report	Fernandes 34' (pen.), 64'

Indira Gandhi Athletic Stadium, Guwahati
Attendance: 2,748
Referee: Khamis Al-Kuwari (Qatar)

13 April 2016
16:00 UTC+6:30

Yangon United (Myanmar)	1–1	(India) Mohun Bagan
Adilson 26'	Report	Glen 42'

Thuwunna Stadium, Yangon
Attendance: 590
Referee: Yu Ming-hsun (Chinese Taipei)
13 April 2016
20:00 UTC+8

South China (Hong Kong)	2–0	(Maldives) Maziya
Law Hiu Chung 35'; Chan Siu Ki 43'	Report

Mong Kok Stadium, Hong Kong
Attendance: 1,254
Referee: Sukhbir Singh (Singapore)

27 April 2016
16:00 UTC+5

Maziya (Maldives)	1–1	(India) Mohun Bagan
Abdulla 65'	Report	Lalpekhlua 90+3'

National Football Stadium, Malé
Attendance: 400
Referee: Wang Di (China)
27 April 2016
20:00 UTC+8

South China (Hong Kong)	2–1	(Myanmar) Yangon United
Griffiths 40' (pen.); Awal 84'	Report	Yamashita 24'

Mong Kok Stadium, Hong Kong
Attendance: 1,814
Referee: Hiroyuki Kimura (Japan)

11 May 2016
18:30 UTC+5:30

Mohun Bagan (India)	0–3	(Hong Kong) South China
	Report	Law Hiu Chung 18'; Griffiths 24'; Awal 33'

Indira Gandhi Athletic Stadium, Guwahati
Attendance: 472
Referee: Yaqoob Abdul Baki (Oman)
11 May 2016
19:30 UTC+6:30

Yangon United (Myanmar)	3–2	(Maldives) Maziya
Fernandes 18'; Kyi Lin 54'; Zaw Min Tun 66'	Report	Abdulla 52'; Easa 83'

Thuwunna Stadium, Yangon
Attendance: 584
Referee: Khamis Al-Marri (Qatar)

=== Group H ===
Pos	Team	Pld	W	D	L	GF	GA	GD	Pts	Qualification	JDT	BFC	AYE	LAO
1	(Malaysia) Johor Darul Ta'zim	6	6	0	0	21	3	+18	18	Knockout stage	—	3–0	8–1	3–0
2	(India) Bengaluru	6	3	0	3	9	10	−1	9	Knockout stage	0–1	—	5–3	2–1
3	(Myanmar) Ayeyawady United	6	2	0	4	12	20	−8	6		1–2	0–1	—	4–2
4	(Laos) Lao Toyota	6	1	0	5	8	17	−9	3		1–4	2–1	2–3	—

Source: AFC
Rules for classification: Group stage tiebreakers
24 February 2016
18:00 UTC+7

Lao Toyota (Laos)	2–1	(India) Bengaluru
Honma 2'; Syvilay 34'	Report	Vineeth 90'

New Laos National Stadium, Vientiane
Attendance: 800
Referee: Yu Ming-hsun (Chinese Taipei)
24 February 2016
20:45 UTC+8

Johor Darul Ta'zim (Malaysia)	8–1	(Myanmar) Ayeyawady United
Safiq 5', 49', 63'; Díaz 14'; António 31'; Lucero 82', 87'; Aidil 89'	Report	Thiha Zaw 7'

Larkin Stadium, Johor Bahru
Attendance: 11,560
Referee: Ng Chiu Kok (Hong Kong)

9 March 2016
16:00 UTC+6:30

Ayeyawady United (Myanmar)	4–2	(Laos) Lao Toyota
Chizoba 22', 32', 55'; Aung Kyaw Naing 78'	Report	Khanthavong 64', 89'

Thuwunna Stadium, Yangon
Attendance: 242
Referee: Turki Al-Khudhayr (Saudi Arabia)
9 March 2016
19:00 UTC+5:30

Bengaluru (India)	0–1	(Malaysia) Johor Darul Ta'zim
	Report	Safiq 55'

Sree Kanteerava Stadium, Bengaluru
Attendance: 2,792
Referee: Hussein Abo Yehia (Lebanon)

16 March 2016
16:00 UTC+6:30

Ayeyawady United (Myanmar)	0–1	(India) Bengaluru
	Report	Chhetri 34'

Thuwunna Stadium, Yangon
Attendance: 300
Referee: Aziz Asimov (Uzbekistan)
16 March 2016
20:45 UTC+8

Johor Darul Ta'zim (Malaysia)	3–0	(Laos) Lao Toyota
Safiq 62' (pen.), 74' (pen.); Amri 90+2'	Report

Larkin Stadium, Johor Bahru
Attendance: 16,860
Referee: Hanna Hattab (Syria)

13 April 2016
18:00 UTC+7

Lao Toyota (Laos)	1–4	(Malaysia) Johor Darul Ta'zim
Syvilay 42'	Report	Safee 47' (pen.); Fadhli 65'; Amri 78'; Díaz 82'

New Laos National Stadium, Vientiane
Attendance: 200
Referee: Çarymyrat Kurbanow (Turkmenistan)
13 April 2016
19:00 UTC+5:30

Bengaluru (India)	5–3	(Myanmar) Ayeyawady United
Vineeth 21'; George 61', 89'; Doungel 66'; Beingaichho 81'	Report	Thiha Zaw 44'; Chizoba 69', 78'

Sree Kanteerava Stadium, Bengaluru
Attendance: 3,081
Referee: Kim Hee-gon (South Korea)

27 April 2016
16:00 UTC+6:30

Ayeyawady United (Myanmar)	1–2	(Malaysia) Johor Darul Ta'zim
Thiha Zaw 27'	Report	Amirul Hadi 31'; Safee 87'

Thuwunna Stadium, Yangon
Attendance: 207
Referee: Khurram Shahzad (Pakistan)
27 April 2016
19:00 UTC+5:30

Bengaluru (India)	2–1	(Laos) Lao Toyota
Lyngdoh 45+1'; Kim Song-yong 60'	Report	Honma 68'

Sree Kanteerava Stadium, Bengaluru
Attendance: 2,487
Referee: Ho Wai Sing (Hong Kong)

11 May 2016
20:45 UTC+8

Johor Darul Ta'zim (Malaysia)	3–0	(India) Bengaluru
Safiq 70'; Safee 78'; Shaari 90+1' (pen.)	Report

Larkin Stadium, Johor Bahru
Attendance: 6,545
Referee: Turki Al-Khudhayr (Saudi Arabia)
11 May 2016
19:45 UTC+7

Lao Toyota (Laos)	2–3	(Myanmar) Ayeyawady United
Phommasane 29'; Khanthavong 87'	Report	Chizoba 41'; Min Min Thu 50', 81'

New Laos National Stadium, Vientiane
Attendance: 297
Referee: Võ Minh Trí (Vietnam)
