= 2016 AFC Cup qualifying play-off =

Football tournament qualification stage

The 2016 AFC Cup qualifying play-off was played on 9 February 2016. A total of eight teams competed in the qualifying play-off to decide four of the 32 places in the group stage of the 2016 AFC Cup.

== Teams ==
The following eight teams (all from West Zone) entered the qualifying play-off, which consisted of one round only (play-off round):

Zone	Teams entering in play-off round
West Zone	(Bahrain) Al-Hidd; (Lebanon) Tripoli; (Syria) Al-Wahda; (Palestine) Ahli Al-Khaleel; (Tajikistan) Khujand; (Turkmenistan) Balkan; (Kyrgyzstan) Alay Osh; (Pakistan) K-Electric (Winner qualifying round Group A)

No qualifying play-off was held in the East Zone due to lack of teams (all teams directly entered the group stage).

== Format ==
In the qualifying play-off, each tie was played as a single match. Extra time and penalty shoot-out were used to decide the winner if necessary (Regulations Article 10.2). The four winners of the play-off round advanced to the group stage to join the 28 direct entrants.

== Schedule ==
The schedule of each round was as follows.

Round	Match date
Play-off round	9 February 2016

== Bracket ==
The bracket of the qualifying play-off was determined by the AFC based on the association ranking of each team, with the team from the higher-ranked association hosting each match.

=== Play-off 1 ===
Al-Hidd advanced to Group A.

Play-off round
(Bahrain) Al-Hidd	2
(Pakistan) K-Electric	0

=== Play-off 2 ===
Tripoli advanced to Group B.

Play-off round
(Lebanon) Tripoli (p)	0 (7)
(Kyrgyzstan) Alay Osh	0 (6)

=== Play-off 3 ===
Al-Wahda advanced to Group C.

Play-off round
(Syria) Al-Wahda	2
(Turkmenistan) Balkan	0

=== Play-off 4 ===
Ahli Al-Khaleel advanced to Group D.

Play-off round
(Palestine) Ahli Al-Khaleel	1
(Tajikistan) Khujand	0

== Play-off round ==
Team 1	Score	Team 2
West Zone
Al-Hidd (Bahrain)	2–0	(Pakistan) K-Electric
Tripoli (Lebanon)	0–0 (a.e.t.) (7–6 p)	(Kyrgyzstan) Alay Osh
Al-Wahda (Syria)	2–0	(Turkmenistan) Balkan
Ahli Al-Khaleel (Palestine)	1–0	(Tajikistan) Khujand

9 February 2016
13:45 UTC+2

Tripoli (Lebanon)	0–0 (a.e.t.)	(Kyrgyzstan) Alay Osh
	Report
Penalties
Helegbe (penalty scored); Ali (penalty scored); Estanbelli (penalty scored); El Hussein (penalty scored); Taleb (penalty scored); Diab (penalty scored); Fattouh (penalty scored)	7–6	(penalty scored) Sylla; (penalty scored) Rustamov; (penalty scored) Alimov; (penalty scored) Rakhmonov; (penalty scored) Kydyraliev; (penalty scored) Zholdoshov; (penalty missed) Akhmedov

Tripoli Municipal Stadium, Tripoli
Attendance: 4,000
Referee: Ahmed Al-Kaf (Oman)

9 February 2016
14:15 UTC+2

Al-Wahda (Syria)	2–0	(Turkmenistan) Balkan
Rafe 17'; Mobayed 53'	Report

Saida Municipal Stadium, Saida (Lebanon) (Note: Teams from Syria were not allowed to host their home matches in their country due to security concerns.)
Attendance: 80
Referee: Hettikamkanamge Perera (Sri Lanka)

9 February 2016
16:00 UTC+2

Ahli Al-Khaleel (Palestine)	1–0	(Tajikistan) Khujand
Wadi 22'	Report

Dora International Stadium, Hebron
Attendance: 5,000
Referee: Adham Makhadmeh (Jordan)

9 February 2016
18:00 UTC+3

Al-Hidd (Bahrain)	2–0	(Pakistan) K-Electric
Omosuyi 55'; Hasan 90+3'	Report

Bahrain National Stadium, Riffa
Attendance: 200
Referee: Ma Ning (China)
