= 2016 AFC Cup qualifying round =

2016 AFC Cup play-off qualifiers

Tournament details
- Host countries: Bhutan; Kyrgyzstan
- Dates: 11–15 August 2015
- Teams: 6 (from 6 associations)

Tournament statistics
- Matches played: 6
- Goals scored: 16 (2.67 per match)
- Attendance: 20,500 (3,417 per match)
- Top scorer(s): (Nigeria) Emeka Onuoha (Pakistan) Muhammad Rasool (Bangladesh) Shakhawat Hossain Rony (2 goals each)

The 2016 AFC Cup qualifying round was played from 11 to 15 August 2015. A total of six teams competed in the qualifying round to decide two places in the competition proper of the 2016 AFC Cup.

The AFC Cup qualifying round was held to replace the AFC President's Cup, whose last edition was held in 2014, as starting from 2015, league champions of "emerging countries" were eligible to participate in the AFC Cup qualifying play-off.

== Teams ==
A total of six teams six nine AFC associations competed in the qualifying round. Teams were not split into zones for the qualifying round.

In the following table, the number of appearances and last appearance count all those since the 2004 season (including both competition proper and qualifying rounds).

Association	Team	Qualifying method	App	Last App
Bangladesh	Sheikh Jamal Dhanmondi	2013–14 Bangladesh Football Premier League champions	1st	none
Bhutan	Druk United	2014 Bhutan National League champions	1st	none
Kyrgyzstan	Alga	2014 Kyrgyzstan League 3rd place	1st	none
Macau	Benfica de Macau	2015 Campeonato da 1ª Divisão do Futebol champions	1st	none
Mongolia	Khoromkhon	2014 Mongolian Premier League champions	1st	none
Pakistan	K-Electric	2014–15 Pakistan Premier League champions	1st	none

== Draw ==
The draw for the qualifying round was held on 29 June 2015 at the AFC House in Kuala Lumpur, Malaysia. The six teams were drawn into two groups of three.

For the draw, the pre-selected hosts were placed in their own pot, while the remaining teams were seeded according to the performance of their association in the 2014 AFC President's Cup.

Pot 1 (Hosts)	Pot 2	Pot 3
(Bhutan) Druk United; (Kyrgyzstan) Alga	(Bangladesh) Sheikh Jamal Dhanmondi; (Mongolia) Khoromkhon	(Pakistan) K-Electric; Benfica de Macau

== Format ==
In the qualifying round, each group was played on a single round-robin basis at the pre-selected hosts. The winners of each group advanced to either the qualifying play-off or the group stage (depending on number of teams in each zone and geographical location).

=== Tiebreakers ===
The teams were ranked according to points (3 points for a win, 1 point for a draw, 0 points for a loss). If tied on points, tiebreakers would be applied in the following order:

1. Greater number of points obtained in the group matches between the teams concerned;
2. Goal difference resulting from the group matches between the teams concerned;
3. Greater number of goals scored in the group matches between the teams concerned;
4. Goal difference in all the group matches;
5. Greater number of goals scored in all the group matches;
6. Penalty shoot-out if only two teams are involved and they are both on the field of play;
7. Fewer score calculated according to the number of yellow and red cards received in the group matches (1 point for a single yellow card, 3 points for a red card as a consequence of two yellow cards, 3 points for a direct red card, 4 points for a yellow card followed by a direct red card);
8. Drawing of lots.

== Schedule ==
The schedule of each matchday was as follows.

Matchday	Date	Match
Matchday 1	11 August 2015	Team 3 vs. Team 1
Matchday 2	13 August 2015	Team 2 vs. Team 3
Matchday 3	15 August 2015	Team 1 vs. Team 2

== Host Countries ==
Group A	Group B
(Bhutan) Thimphu	(Kyrgyzstan) Bishkek
Changlimithang Stadium	Dolen Omurzakov Stadium
Capacity: 45,000	Capacity: 23,000

== Groups ==
=== Group A ===
- All matches were held in Bhutan.
- Times listed were UTC+6.

Pos	Team	Pld	W	D	L	GF	GA	GD	Pts	Qualification	KEL	DRU	KHO
1	(Pakistan) K-Electric	2	1	1	0	4	3	+1	4	Qualifying play-off	—	3–3	—
2	(Bhutan) Druk United (H)	2	0	2	0	3	3	0	2		—	—	0–0
3	(Mongolia) Khoromkhon	2	0	1	1	0	1	−1	1		0–1	—	—

Source: AFC
(H) Hosts
11 August 2015
18:00

K-Electric (Pakistan)	3–3	(Bhutan) Druk United
Rasool 8', 45'; Rehman 86'	Report	Ts. Dorji 21'; Wangdi 58'; Th. Dorji 75'

Changlimithang Stadium, Thimphu
Attendance: 3,000
Referee: Fu Ming (China)

13 August 2015
18:00

Khoromkhon (Mongolia)	0–1	(Pakistan) K-Electric
	Report	Oludeyi 74'

Changlimithang Stadium, Thimphu
Attendance: 1,000
Referee: Masoud Tufayelieh (Syria)

15 August 2015
18:00

Druk United (Bhutan)	0–0	(Mongolia) Khoromkhon
	Report

Changlimithang Stadium, Thimphu
Attendance: 2,500
Referee: Ilgiz Tantashev (Uzbekistan)

=== Group B ===
- All matches were held in Kyrgyzstan.
- Times listed were UTC+6.

Pos	Team	Pld	W	D	L	GF	GA	GD	Pts	Qualification	SJD	ALG	BEN
1	(Bangladesh) Sheikh Jamal Dhanmondi	2	1	1	0	5	2	+3	4	Group stage (Note: Sheikh Jamal Dhanmondi advanced directly to the group stage due to an insufficient number of teams in the East Zone.)	—	—	4–1
2	(Kyrgyzstan) Alga (H)	2	1	1	0	3	1	+2	4		1–1	—	—
3	Benfica de Macau	2	0	0	2	1	6	−5	0		—	0–2	—

Source: AFC
(H) Hosts
Notes:
11 August 2015
18:00

Benfica de Macau	0–2	(Kyrgyzstan) Alga
	Report	Filatov 29'; Akhmataliev 65'

Dolen Omurzakov Stadium, Bishkek
Attendance: 5,000
Referee: Mooud Bonyadifard (Iran)

13 August 2015
18:00

Sheikh Jamal Dhanmondi (Bangladesh)	4–1	Benfica de Macau
Onuoha 44'; Islam 72'; Rony 77', 86'	Report	Torrão 26'

Dolen Omurzakov Stadium, Bishkek
Attendance: 1,000
Referee: Rowan Arumughan (India)

15 August 2015
18:00

Alga (Kyrgyzstan)	1–1	(Bangladesh) Sheikh Jamal Dhanmondi
Amirov 22'	Report	Onuoha 78'

Dolen Omurzakov Stadium, Bishkek
Attendance: 8,000
Referee: Mohd Nafeez Abdul Wahab (Malaysia)
