= 2016 AFC Cup knockout stage =

Association football tournament

The 2016 AFC Cup knockout stage was played from 24 May to 5 November 2016. A total of 16 teams competed in the knockout stage to decide the champions of the 2016 AFC Cup.

== Qualified teams ==
The winners and runners-up of each of the eight groups in the group stage qualified for the knockout stage. Both West Zone and East Zone had eight qualified teams.

Zone	Group	Winners	Runners-up
West Zone (Groups A–D)	A	(Lebanon) Al-Ahed	(Jordan) Al-Wehdat
West Zone (Groups A–D)	B	(Iraq) Naft Al-Wasat	(Jordan) Al-Faisaly
West Zone (Groups A–D)	C	(Iraq) Al-Quwa Al-Jawiya	(Syria) Al-Wahda
West Zone (Groups A–D)	D	(Bahrain) Al-Muharraq	(Syria) Al-Jaish
East Zone (Groups E–H)	E	(Philippines) Ceres	(Singapore) Tampines Rovers
East Zone (Groups E–H)	F	(Hong Kong) Kitchee	(Philippines) Kaya
East Zone (Groups E–H)	G	(India) Mohun Bagan	(Hong Kong) South China
East Zone (Groups E–H)	H	(Malaysia) Johor Darul Ta'zim	(India) Bengaluru

== Format ==
In the knockout stage, the 16 teams played a single-elimination tournament, with the teams split between the two zones until the final. In the quarter-finals and semi-finals, each tie was played on a home-and-away two-legged basis, while in the round of 16 and final, each tie was played as a single match. The away goals rule (for two-legged ties), extra time (away goals would not apply in extra time) and penalty shoot-out were used to decide the winner if necessary (Regulations Article 12.4).

Starting from this season, the knockout stage was split between the two zones until the final, similar to the AFC Champions League (Regulations Article 12.3).

== Schedule ==
The schedule of each round was as follows.

Round	First leg	Second leg
Round of 16	24–25 May 2016	
Quarter-finals	13–14 September 2016	20–21 September 2016
Semi-finals	27–28 September 2016	18–19 October 2016
Final	5 November 2016	

== Bracket ==
The bracket of the knockout stage was determined as follows:

- Round of 16: (group winners host match)

West Zone

- Winner Group A vs. Runner-up Group C
- Winner Group C vs. Runner-up Group A
- Winner Group B vs. Runner-up Group D
- Winner Group D vs. Runner-up Group B

East Zone

- Winner Group E vs. Runner-up Group G
- Winner Group G vs. Runner-up Group E
- Winner Group F vs. Runner-up Group H
- Winner Group H vs. Runner-up Group F

- Quarterfinals: (matchups and order of legs decided by draw)

West Zone

- QF1
- QF2

East Zone

- QF3
- QF4

- Semifinals: (Winners QF1 and QF3 host first leg, Winners QF2 and QF4 host second leg)

West Zone

- SF1: Winner QF1 vs. Winner QF2

East Zone

- SF2: Winner QF3 vs. Winner QF4

- Final: Winner SF1 vs. Winner SF2 (host team decided by draw)

Round of 16	Quarter-finals
(Iraq) Al-Quwa Al-Jawiya	2
(Jordan) Al-Wehdat	1
(Iraq) Al-Quwa Al-Jawiya	1	4	5
(Syria) Al-Jaish	1	0	1
(Iraq) Naft Al-Wasat	0
(Syria) Al-Jaish	1
West Zone
(Lebanon) Al-Ahed	4
(Syria) Al-Wahda	0
(Lebanon) Al-Ahed	1	2	3
(Bahrain) Al-Muharraq	0	0	0
(Bahrain) Al-Muharraq	1
(Jordan) Al-Faisaly	0
(Philippines) Ceres	0
(Hong Kong) South China (a.e.t.)	1
(Hong Kong) South China	1	1	2
(Malaysia) Johor Darul Ta'zim	1	2	3
(Malaysia) Johor Darul Ta'zim	7
(Philippines) Kaya	2
East Zone
(Hong Kong) Kitchee	2
(India) Bengaluru	3
(India) Bengaluru	1	0	1
(Singapore) Tampines Rovers	0	0	0
(India) Mohun Bagan	1
(Singapore) Tampines Rovers (a.e.t.)	2

Semi-finals
(Iraq) Al-Quwa Al-Jawiya	1	3	4
(Lebanon) Al-Ahed	1	2	3
(Malaysia) Johor Darul Ta'zim	1	1	2
(India) Bengaluru	1	3	4

Final
(Iraq) Al-Quwa Al-Jawiya	1
(India) Bengaluru	0

== Round of 16 ==
In the round of 16, the winners of one group played the runners-up of another group from the same zone, with the group winners hosting the match.

Team 1	Score	Team 2
West Zone
Al-Ahed (Lebanon)	4–0	(Syria) Al-Wahda
Al-Quwa Al-Jawiya (Iraq)	2–1	(Jordan) Al-Wehdat
Naft Al-Wasat (Iraq)	0–1	(Syria) Al-Jaish
Al-Muharraq (Bahrain)	1–0	(Jordan) Al-Faisaly
East Zone
Ceres (Philippines)	0–1 (a.e.t.)	(Hong Kong) South China
Mohun Bagan (India)	1–2 (a.e.t.)	(Singapore) Tampines Rovers
Kitchee (Hong Kong)	2–3	(India) Bengaluru
Johor Darul Ta'zim (Malaysia)	7–2	(Philippines) Kaya

=== West Zone ===
24 May 2016
16:00 UTC+3

Al-Ahed (Lebanon)	4–0	(Syria) Al-Wahda
Atwi 12'; Al-Hussain 75' (pen.); Dramé 88', 90+3'	Report

Saida Municipal Stadium, Saida
Attendance: 1,200
Referee: Mohsen Torky (Iran)

24 May 2016
19:00 UTC+3

Al-Quwa Al-Jawiya (Iraq)	2–1	(Jordan) Al-Wehdat
Abdul-Wahid 15'; Ahmad 37'	Report	Deeb 43'

Saoud bin Abdulrahman Stadium, Al Wakrah (Qatar) (Note: Teams from Iraq were not allowed to host their home matches in their country due to security concerns.)
Attendance: 2,500
Referee: Ma Ning (China)

25 May 2016
17:00 UTC+4:30

Naft Al-Wasat (Iraq)	0–1	(Syria) Al-Jaish
	Report	Hamdoko 78'

PAS Stadium, Tehran (Iran)
Attendance: 50
Referee: Liu Kwok Man (Hong Kong)

25 May 2016
18:45 UTC+3

Al-Muharraq (Bahrain)	1–0	(Jordan) Al-Faisaly
Kanú 81'	Report

Bahrain National Stadium, Riffa
Attendance: 5,000
Referee: Rowan Arumughan (India)

=== East Zone ===
24 May 2016
19:30 UTC+8

Ceres (Philippines)	0–1 (a.e.t.)	(Hong Kong) South China
	Report	Carlos 107'

Panaad Park and Stadium, Bacolod
Attendance: 8,000
Referee: Ali Abdulnabi (Bahrain)

24 May 2016
19:00 UTC+5:30

Mohun Bagan (India)	1–2 (a.e.t.)	(Singapore) Tampines Rovers
Singh 72'	Report	Webb 63'; Yunos 116'

Indira Gandhi Athletic Stadium, Guwahati
Attendance: 282
Referee: Turki Al-Khudhayr (Saudi Arabia)

25 May 2016
20:00 UTC+8

Kitchee (Hong Kong)	2–3	(India) Bengaluru
Rufino 7'; Tarrés 42'	Report	Chhetri 31' (pen.), 33'; Lalhlimpuia 51'

Mong Kok Stadium, Hong Kong
Attendance: 2,806
Referee: Fu Ming (China)

25 May 2016
20:45 UTC+8

Johor Darul Ta'zim (Malaysia)	7–2	(Philippines) Kaya
Lucero 14', 54', 70'; Díaz 23' (pen.); Azamuddin 33', 40'; Mahali 69'	Report	Porteria 53'; Ugarte 88'

Larkin Stadium, Johor Bahru
Attendance: 17,322
Referee: Fahad Al-Marri (Qatar)

== Quarter-finals ==
In the quarter-finals, the four teams from the West Zone were drawn into two ties, and the four teams from the East Zone were drawn into the other two ties, with the order of legs also decided by the draw.

The draw for the quarter-finals was held on 9 June 2016, 15:00 MYT (UTC+8), at the Petaling Jaya Hilton Hotel in Kuala Lumpur, Malaysia. There was no seeding or country protection, so teams from the same association could be drawn into the same tie.

Team 1	Agg.	Team 2	1st leg	2nd leg
West Zone
Al-Quwa Al-Jawiya (Iraq)	5–1	(Syria) Al-Jaish	1–1	4–0
Al-Ahed (Lebanon)	3–0	(Bahrain) Al-Muharraq	1–0	2–0
East Zone
South China (Hong Kong)	2–3	(Malaysia) Johor Darul Ta'zim	1–1	1–2
Bengaluru (India)	1–0	(Singapore) Tampines Rovers	1–0	0–0

=== West Zone ===
13 September 2016
19:00 UTC+3

Al-Quwa Al-Jawiya (Iraq)	1–1	(Syria) Al-Jaish
Ahmad 90+8'	Report	Al-Ali 60'

Saoud bin Abdulrahman Stadium, Al Wakrah (Qatar)
Attendance: 400
Referee: Timur Faizullin (Kyrgyzstan)
20 September 2016
19:00 UTC+3

Al-Jaish (Syria)	0–4	(Iraq) Al-Quwa Al-Jawiya
	Report	Rasan 50'; Radhi 67'; Ahmad 80'; Mohsin 90+2'

Saoud bin Abdulrahman Stadium, Al Wakrah (Qatar) (Note: Teams from Syria were not allowed to host their home matches in their country due to security concerns.)
Attendance: 312
Referee: Liu Kwok Man (Hong Kong)

Al-Quwa Al-Jawiya won 5–1 on aggregate.

14 September 2016
15:30 UTC+3

Al-Ahed (Lebanon)	1–0	(Bahrain) Al-Muharraq
Zreik 5'	Report

Camille Chamoun Sports City Stadium, Beirut
Attendance: 3,200
Referee: Ma Ning (China)
21 September 2016
18:00 UTC+3

Al-Muharraq (Bahrain)	0–2	(Lebanon) Al-Ahed
	Report	Musa 23'; Zreik 90+3'

Bahrain National Stadium, Riffa
Attendance: 2,500
Referee: Turki Al-Khudhayr (Saudi Arabia)

Al-Ahed won 3–0 on aggregate.

=== East Zone ===
13 September 2016
20:00 UTC+8

South China (Hong Kong)	1–1	(Malaysia) Johor Darul Ta'zim
Komazec 90+3'	Report	Díaz 22'

Mong Kok Stadium, Hong Kong
Attendance: 3,938
Referee: Ali Sabah (Iraq)
20 September 2016
20:45 UTC+8

Johor Darul Ta'zim (Malaysia)	2–1	(Hong Kong) South China
Lucero 58'; Díaz 88'	Report	Komazec 90+5'

Larkin Stadium, Johor Bahru
Attendance: 17,350
Referee: Ilgiz Tantashev (Uzbekistan)

Johor Darul Ta'zim won 3–2 on aggregate.

14 September 2016
16:00 UTC+5:30

Bengaluru (India)	1–0	(Singapore) Tampines Rovers
Vineeth 7'	Report

Sree Kanteerava Stadium, Bengaluru
Attendance: 120 (Note: The Bengaluru v Tampines Rovers match was played behind closed doors due to local unrest.)
Referee: Ahmed Al-Kaf (Oman)
21 September 2016
19:30 UTC+8

Tampines Rovers (Singapore)	0–0	(India) Bengaluru
	Report

Jalan Besar Stadium, Singapore
Attendance: 1,985
Referee: Kim Dong-jin (South Korea)

Bengaluru won 1–0 on aggregate.

== Semi-finals ==
In the semi-finals, the two quarter-final winners from the West Zone played each other, and the two quarter-final winners from the East Zone played each other, with the order of legs determined by the quarter-final draw.

Team 1	Agg.	Team 2	1st leg	2nd leg
West Zone
Al-Quwa Al-Jawiya (Iraq)	4–3	(Lebanon) Al-Ahed	1–1	3–2
East Zone
Johor Darul Ta'zim (Malaysia)	2–4	(India) Bengaluru	1–1	1–3

=== West Zone ===
27 September 2016
19:00 UTC+3

Al-Quwa Al-Jawiya (Iraq)	1–1	(Lebanon) Al-Ahed
Midani 24'	Report	Dakik 62'

Saoud bin Abdulrahman Stadium, Al Wakrah (Qatar)
Attendance: 189
Referee: Fahad Al-Marri (Qatar)
18 October 2016
15:30 UTC+3

Al-Ahed (Lebanon)	2–3	(Iraq) Al-Quwa Al-Jawiya
Mansour 14' (pen.); Chaito 36'	Report	Ahmad 28'; Mansour 70' (o.g.); Rasan 76'

Camille Chamoun Sports City Stadium, Beirut
Attendance: 3,700
Referee: Hettikamkanamge Perera (Sri Lanka)

Al-Quwa Al-Jawiya won 4–3 on aggregate.

=== East Zone ===
28 September 2016
20:45 UTC+8

Johor Darul Ta'zim (Malaysia)	1–1	(India) Bengaluru
Díaz 52'	Report	Lyngdoh 56'

Larkin Stadium, Johor Bahru
Attendance: 18,000
Referee: Adham Makhadmeh (Jordan)
19 October 2016
19:00 UTC+5:30

Bengaluru (India)	3–1	(Malaysia) Johor Darul Ta'zim
Chhetri 41', 67'; Juanan 76'	Report	Safiq 11'

Sree Kanteerava Stadium, Bengaluru
Attendance: 21,379
Referee: Ali Abdulnabi (Bahrain)

Bengaluru won 4–2 on aggregate.

== Final ==
In the final, the two semi-final winners played each other, with the host team decided by a draw, held after the quarter-final draw.

Team 1	Score	Team 2
Al-Quwa Al-Jawiya (Iraq)	1–0	(India) Bengaluru

5 November 2016
19:00 UTC+3

Al-Quwa Al-Jawiya (Iraq)	1–0	(India) Bengaluru
Ahmad 70'	Report

Suheim bin Hamad Stadium, Doha (Qatar)
Attendance: 5,806
Referee: Kim Jong-hyeok (South Korea)
