= Ahmed Al Khattal =

Bahraini footballer

Personal information
- Full name: Ahmed Ebrahim Mubarak Al Khattal
- Date of birth: 6 October 1988 (age 38)
- Place of birth: Bahrain
- Position: Forward

Team information
- Current team: Al Hala

Senior career*
Years	Team	Apps	(Gls)
2010–	Al Hala		

International career^{‡}
2011–	Bahrain	3	(0)
- * Club domestic league appearances and goals ‡ National team caps and goals as of 4 April 2012

Ahmed Ebrahim Mubarak Isa Al Khattal (born 6 October 1988) is a Bahraini footballer playing with Al Hala of Bahrain and the Bahrain national football team.
