= 2016 AFC Cup =

Football tournament

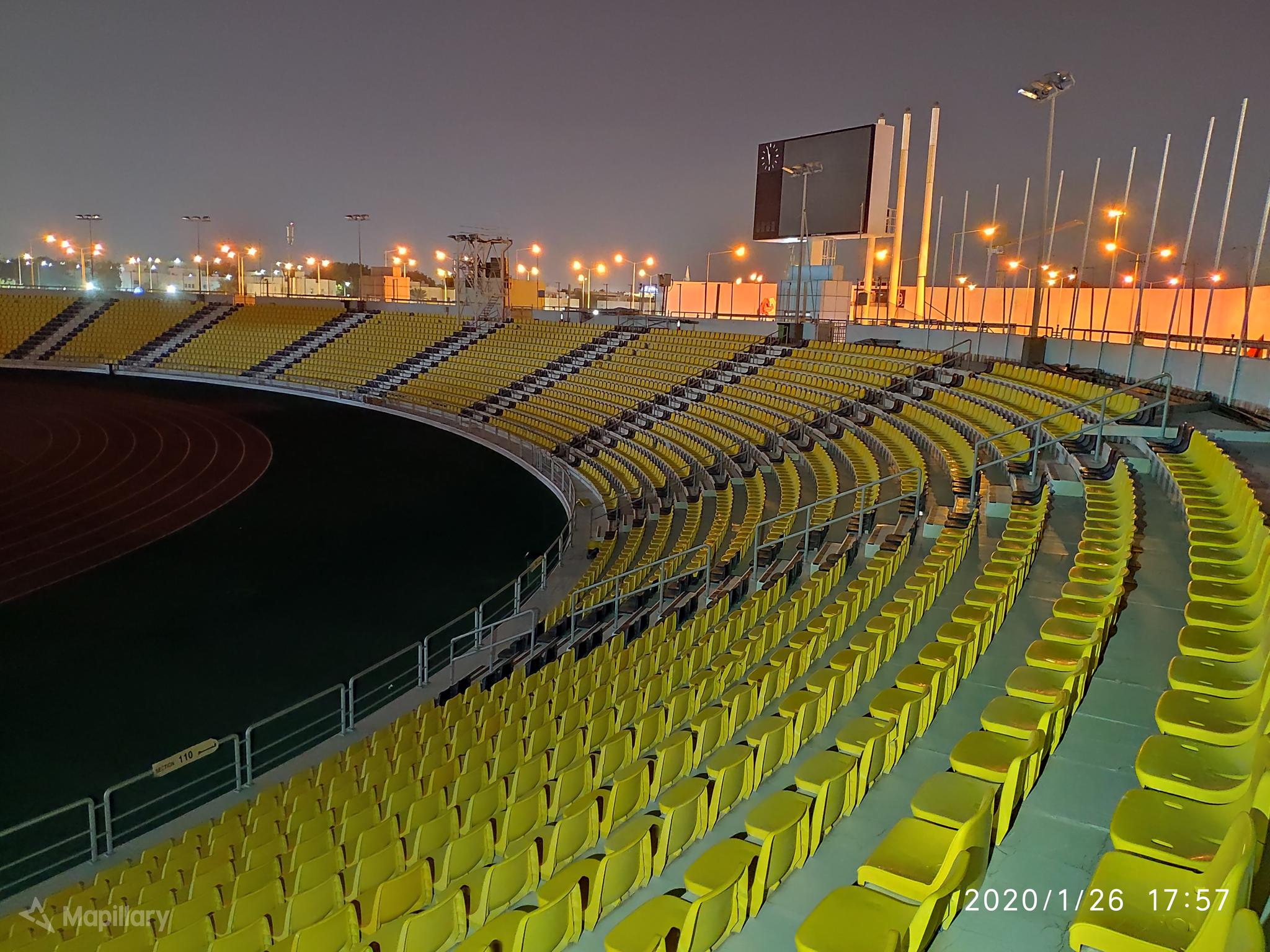
- The Suheim Bin Hamad Stadium in Doha hosted the final

Tournament details
- Dates: Qualifying round: 11–15 August 2015; Competition proper: 9 February – 5 November 2016
- Teams: Competition proper: 32; Total: 40 (from 23 associations)

Final positions
- Champions: (Iraq) Al-Quwa Al-Jawiya (1st title)
- Runners-up: (India) Bengaluru

Tournament statistics
- Matches played: 127
- Goals scored: 361 (2.84 per match)
- Attendance: 394,183 (3,104 per match)
- Top scorer: (Iraq) Hammadi Ahmed (16 goals)
- Best player: (Iraq) Hammadi Ahmed
- Fair play award: (India) Bengaluru

The 2016 AFC Cup was the 13th edition of the AFC Cup, Asia's secondary club football tournament organized by the Asian Football Confederation (AFC).

Al-Quwa Al-Jawiya from Iraq defeated India's Bengaluru in the final to win their first AFC Cup title, becoming the first Iraqi team to win the competition. Johor Darul Ta'zim, the defending champions, were eliminated in the semi-finals by Bengaluru.

== Association team allocation ==
The AFC Competitions Committee proposed a revamp of the AFC club competitions on 25 January 2014, which was ratified by the AFC Executive Committee on 16 April 2014. The 46 AFC member associations (excluding the associate member Northern Mariana Islands) are ranked based on their national team's and clubs' performance over the last four years in AFC competitions, with the allocation of slots for the 2015 and 2016 editions of the AFC club competitions determined by the 2014 rankings:

- The associations are split into West Zone and East Zone, with 23 associations in each zone:
  - West Zone consists of the associations from West Asia, Central Asia, South Asia, except India and Maldives
  - East Zone consists of the associations from ASEAN and East Asia, plus India and Maldives
- In each zone, there are a total of 12 direct slots in the group stage, with the 4 remaining slots filled through play-offs.
- All associations which do not receive direct slots in the AFC Champions League group stage are eligible to enter the AFC Cup.
- The associations ranked 7th to 16th in each zone get at least one direct slot in the group stage (including losers of the AFC Champions League qualifying play-off), while the remaining associations get only play-off slots:
  - The associations ranked 7th and 8th each get two direct slots.
  - The associations ranked 9th to 12th each get one direct slot and one play-off slot (in play-off round).
  - The associations ranked 13th to 16th each get one direct slot and one play-off slot (in preliminary round).
  - The associations ranked 17th or below each get one play-off slot (in qualifying round).

The AFC Competitions Committee decided on the participation of member associations in the 2015 and 2016 editions of the AFC Cup on 28 November 2014.

The following table shows the slot allocation for the 2016 AFC Cup, which are adjusted accordingly since some of the slots are unused.

Participation for 2016 AFC Cup
Participating
Not participating

West Zone
Rank		Member Association	Points	Slots			
Rank		Member Association	Points	ACL Play-off	Group stage	Play-off round	Qualif. round
6	10	Iraq	47.106	0	2	0	0
7	11	Kuwait	45.423	0	0	0	0
8	12	Jordan	44.309	1	1	0	0
9	14	Oman	30.586	0	2	0	0
10	16	Bahrain	25.547	0	1	1	0
11	17	Lebanon	25.043	0	1	1	0
12	19	Syria	22.883	0	1	1	0
13	25	Palestine	15.911	0	1	1	0
14	28	Tajikistan	11.761	0	1	1	0
15	29	Afghanistan	11.464	0	0	0	0
16	30	Turkmenistan	10.554	0	1	1	0
17	32	Kyrgyzstan	8.761	0	0	1	1
18	35	Yemen	5.249	0	0	0	0
19	36	(Sri Lanka) Sri Lanka	4.071	0	0	0	0
20	38	Nepal	3.268	0	0	0	0
21	39	Pakistan	2.732	0	0	0	1
22	46	Bhutan	0.000	0	0	0	1
Total				1	11	7	3
Total				22			

East Zone
Rank		Member Association	Points	Slots			
Rank		Member Association	Points	ACL Play-off	Group stage	Play-off round	Qualif. round
7	18	Indonesia	25.004	0	0	0	0
8	20	(Hong Kong) Hong Kong	20.077	1	1	0	0
9	21	Myanmar	18.949	1	1	0	0
10	22	Malaysia	18.153	1	1	0	0
11	23	India	16.756	1	1	0	0
12	24	Singapore	16.097	1	1	0	0
13	26	Maldives	15.884	0	2	0	0
14	27	Philippines	12.268	0	2	0	0
15	31	(North Korea) North Korea	9.000	0	0	0	0
16	33	Laos	7.554	0	1	0	0
17	34	Guam	5.946	0	0	0	0
18	37	Bangladesh	3.643	0	0	0	1
19	39	(Timor-Leste) East Timor	2.732	0	0	0	0
20	41	Macau	2.625	0	0	0	1
21	42	Cambodia	2.464	0	0	0	0
22	43	(Chinese Taipei) Chinese Taipei	2.089	0	0	0	0
23	44	Mongolia	1.554	0	0	0	1
24	45	Brunei	0.804	0	0	0	0
Total				5	10	0	3
Total				18			

Notes

1. Iraq were given special permission to participate in the AFC Cup, since they were not allowed to participate in the AFC Champions League as none of their teams passed the club licensing requirements.
2. Kuwait were allocated one AFC Champions League play-off slot and one group stage slot, but could not participate due to FIFA's suspension of its football association.
3. Oman were not allowed to participate in the AFC Champions League as none of their teams passed the club licensing requirements, so their champions directly entered the AFC Cup group stage. They also had their second team directly entering the group stage instead of the play-off round due to unused slots.
4. Bahrain, Lebanon and Syria were not allowed to participate in the AFC Champions League as none of their teams passed the club licensing requirements, so their champions directly entered the AFC Cup group stage.
5. Palestine, Tajikistan and Turkmenistan all had their second team entering the play-off round instead of the preliminary round due to unused slots.
6. Afghanistan were allocated one group stage slot and one preliminary round slot, but did not enter a team.
7. Kyrgyzstan were originally allocated one qualifying round slot, but were given an additional play-off round slot.
8. Yemen, Sri Lanka and Nepal were allocated one qualifying round slot, but did not enter a team.
9. Indonesia were allocated one AFC Champions League play-off slot and one group stage slot, but could not participate due to FIFA's suspension of its football association.
10. Myanmar, Malaysia, India and Singapore all had their second team directly entering the group stage instead of the play-off round due to unused slots.
11. Maldives and Philippines both had their second team directly entering the group stage instead of the preliminary round due to unused slots.
12. North Korea were allocated one group stage slot and one preliminary round slot, but did not enter a team.
13. Laos were allocated one group stage slot and one preliminary round slot, but entered only one team as Lao Toyota FC is the only team in Laos eligible to play in AFC Cup.
14. Guam, East Timor, Cambodia, Chinese Taipei and Brunei were allocated one qualifying round slot, but did not enter a team.
15. Bangladesh was originally in the West Zone, but was moved to the East Zone due to lack of teams in the East Zone.

== Teams ==
The following 40 teams from 23 associations entered the competition.

West Zone
Team	Qualifying method	App	Last App
Group stage direct entrants (Groups A–D)
(Iraq) Naft Al-Wasat	2014–15 Iraqi Premier League champions	1st	none
(Iraq) Al-Quwa Al-Jawiya	2014–15 Iraqi Premier League runners-up	1st	none
(Jordan) Al-Wehdat	2014–15 Jordan League champions	9th	2015
(Jordan) Al-Faisaly	2014–15 Jordan FA Cup winners	8th	2013
(Oman) Al-Orouba	2014–15 Oman Professional League champions and 2014–15 Sultan Qaboos Cup winners	4th	2012
(Oman) Fanja	2014–15 Oman Professional League runners-up	4th	2015
(Bahrain) Al-Muharraq	2014–15 Bahrain First Division League champions	5th	2009
(Lebanon) Al-Ahed	2014–15 Lebanese Premier League champions	7th	2012
(Syria) Al-Jaish	2014–15 Syrian Premier League champions	6th	2015
(Palestine) Shabab Al-Dhahiriya	2014–15 West Bank Premier League champions	2nd	2014
(Tajikistan) Istiklol	2015 Tajik League champions and 2015 Tajik Cup winners	2nd	2015
(Turkmenistan) Altyn Asyr	2015 Ýokary Liga champions and 2015 Turkmenistan Cup winners	2nd	2015
Entering in qualifying play-off (play-off round)
(Bahrain) Al-Hidd	2015 Bahraini King's Cup winners	3rd	2015
(Lebanon) Tripoli	2014–15 Lebanese FA Cup winners	2nd	2004
(Syria) Al-Wahda	2015 Syrian Cup winners	5th	2015
(Palestine) Ahli Al-Khaleel	2014–15 Palestine Cup winners	1st	none
(Tajikistan) Khujand	2015 Tajik League runners-up	1st	none
(Turkmenistan) Balkan	2015 Ýokary Liga runners-up	4th	2007
(Kyrgyzstan) Alay Osh	2015 Kyrgyzstan League champions	2nd	2014

East Zone
Team	Qualifying method	App	Last App
Group stage direct entrants (Groups E–H)
(Hong Kong) Kitchee	2014–15 Hong Kong Premier League champions	6th	2015
(Hong Kong) South China	2014–15 Hong Kong season play-off winners	7th	2015
(Myanmar) Yangon United	2015 Myanmar National League champions	4th	2014
(Myanmar) Ayeyawady United	2015 General Aung San Shield winners	4th	2015
(Malaysia) Johor Darul Ta'zim	2015 Malaysia Super League champions	3rd	2015
(Malaysia) Selangor	2015 Malaysia Super League runners-up	5th	2014
(India) Mohun Bagan	2014–15 I-League champions	3rd	2009
(India) Bengaluru	2014–15 Indian Federation Cup winners	2nd	2015
(Singapore) Tampines Rovers	2015 S.League runners-up	8th	2014
(Singapore) Balestier Khalsa	2015 S.League 4th place	2nd	2015
(Maldives) New Radiant	2015 Dhivehi Premier League champions	8th	2015
(Maldives) Maziya	2015 Maldives President's Cup winners	4th	2015
(Philippines) Ceres	2015 UFL Division 1 champions	2nd	2015
(Philippines) Kaya	2015 UFL Cup winners	1st	none
(Laos) Lao Toyota	2015 Lao Premier League champions	2nd	2015

Team	Qualifying method	App	Last App
Entering in qualifying round (teams not split into zones for qualifying round)
(Kyrgyzstan) Alga	2014 Kyrgyzstan League 3rd place	1st	none
(Bangladesh) Sheikh Jamal Dhanmondi	2013–14 Bangladesh Football Premier League champions	1st	none
(Pakistan) K-Electric	2014–15 Pakistan Premier League champions	1st	none
Benfica de Macau	2015 Campeonato da 1ª Divisão do Futebol champions	1st	none
(Mongolia) Khoromkhon	2014 Mongolian Premier League champions	1st	none
(Bhutan) Druk United	2014 Bhutan National League champions	1st	none

Notes

1. AFC Champions League (ACL): Teams played in the 2016 AFC Champions League qualifying play-off, but failed to advance to the AFC Champions League group stage (had they advanced to the AFC Champions League group stage, they would have been replaced in the AFC Cup group stage by another team from the same association).
2. Malaysia (MAS): Since LionsXII, the 2015 Malaysia FA Cup winners, is a team managed by the Football Association of Singapore and thus ineligible to represent Malaysia in AFC club competitions, their place was taken by Selangor, the 2015 Malaysia Super League runners-up.
3. Singapore (SIN): Since Brunei DPMM, the 2015 S.League champions, is a team managed by the National Football Association of Brunei Darussalam and thus ineligible to represent Singapore in AFC club competitions, their place was taken by Tampines Rovers, the league runners-up. Moreover, since Albirex Niigata Singapore, the 2015 Singapore Cup winners and league 3rd place, is a satellite team of Japanese club Albirex Niigata and thus ineligible to represent Singapore in AFC club competitions, their place was taken by Balestier Khalsa, the league 4th place.
Location of teams of the 2016 AFC Cup.
West Zone
East Zone
(p) Qualifying play-off participants
(q) Qualifying round participants

== Schedule ==
The schedule of the competition was as follows (all draws are held in Kuala Lumpur, Malaysia).

Stage	Round	Draw date	First leg	Second leg
Qualifying stage	Qualifying round	29 June 2015	11–15 August 2015	
Play-off stage	Play-off round	No draw	9 February 2016	
Group stage	Matchday 1	10 December 2015	23–24 February 2016	
Group stage	Matchday 2	10 December 2015	8–9 March 2016	
Group stage	Matchday 3	10 December 2015	15–16 March 2016	
Group stage	Matchday 4	10 December 2015	12–13 April 2016	
Group stage	Matchday 5	10 December 2015	26–27 April 2016	
Group stage	Matchday 6	10 December 2015	10–11 May 2016	
Knockout stage	Round of 16	10 December 2015	24–25 May 2016	
Knockout stage	Quarter-finals	9 June 2016	13–14 September 2016	20–21 September 2016
Knockout stage	Semi-finals	9 June 2016	27–28 September 2016	18–19 October 2016
Knockout stage	Final	9 June 2016	5 November 2016 at Suheim bin Hamad Stadium, Doha	

== Qualifying round ==
The draw for the qualifying round was held on 29 June 2015 at the AFC House in Kuala Lumpur, Malaysia. The six teams were drawn into two groups of three. In the qualifying round, each group was played on a single round-robin basis at the pre-selected hosts. The winners of each group advanced to either the qualifying play-off or the group stage (depending on number of teams in each zone and geographical location).

=== Group A ===
Pos	Team	Pld	W	D	L	GF	GA	GD	Pts	Qualification	KEL	DRU	KHO
1	(Pakistan) K-Electric	2	1	1	0	4	3	+1	4	Qualifying play-off	—	3–3	—
2	(Bhutan) Druk United (H)	2	0	2	0	3	3	0	2		—	—	0–0
3	(Mongolia) Khoromkhon	2	0	1	1	0	1	−1	1		0–1	—	—

Source: AFC
(H) Hosts

=== Group B ===
Pos	Team	Pld	W	D	L	GF	GA	GD	Pts	Qualification	SJD	ALG	BEN
1	(Bangladesh) Sheikh Jamal Dhanmondi	2	1	1	0	5	2	+3	4	Group stage (Note: Sheikh Jamal Dhanmondi advanced directly to the group stage due to an insufficient number of teams in the East Zone.)	—	—	4–1
2	(Kyrgyzstan) Alga (H)	2	1	1	0	3	1	+2	4		1–1	—	—
3	Benfica de Macau	2	0	0	2	1	6	−5	0		—	0–2	—

Source: AFC
(H) Hosts

== Qualifying play-off ==
In the qualifying play-off, each tie was played as a single match. Extra time and penalty shoot-out were used to decide the winner if necessary (Regulations Article 10.2). The four winners of the play-off round advanced to the group stage to join the 28 direct entrants. The bracket of the qualifying play-off was determined by the AFC based on the association ranking of each team, with the team from the higher-ranked association hosting each match.

=== Play-off round ===
Team 1	Score	Team 2
West Zone
Al-Hidd (Bahrain)	2–0	(Pakistan) K-Electric
Tripoli (Lebanon)	0–0 (a.e.t.) (7–6 p)	(Kyrgyzstan) Alay Osh
Al-Wahda (Syria)	2–0	(Turkmenistan) Balkan
Ahli Al-Khaleel (Palestine)	1–0	(Tajikistan) Khujand

== Group stage ==
The draw for the group stage was held on 10 December 2015, 15:00 MYT (UTC+8), at the Petaling Jaya Hilton Hotel in Kuala Lumpur, Malaysia. The 32 teams were drawn into eight groups of four. Teams from the same association could not be drawn into the same group. In the group stage, each group was played on a home-and-away round-robin basis. The winners and runners-up of each group advanced to the round of 16.

Tiebreakers
The teams were ranked according to points (3 points for a win, 1 point for a draw, 0 points for a loss). If tied on points, tiebreakers would be applied in the following order (Regulations Article 11.5):
1. Greater number of points obtained in the group matches between the teams concerned;
2. Goal difference resulting from the group matches between the teams concerned;
3. Greater number of goals scored in the group matches between the teams concerned;
4. Greater number of away goals scored in the group matches between the teams concerned;
5. If, after applying criteria 1 to 4, teams still have an equal ranking, criteria 1 to 4 are reapplied exclusively to the matches between the teams in question to determine their final rankings. If this procedure does not lead to a decision, criteria 6 to 10 apply;
6. Goal difference in all the group matches;
7. Greater number of goals scored in all the group matches;
8. Penalty shoot-out if only two teams are involved and they are both on the field of play;
9. Fewer score calculated according to the number of yellow and red cards received in the group matches (1 point for a single yellow card, 3 points for a red card as a consequence of two yellow cards, 3 points for a direct red card, 4 points for a yellow card followed by a direct red card);
10. Team who belongs to the member association with the higher AFC ranking.

=== Group A ===
Pos	Team	Pld	W	D	L	GF	GA	GD	Pts	Qualification	AHE	WEH	HID	ALT
1	(Lebanon) Al-Ahed	6	4	0	2	14	9	+5	12	Knockout stage	—	3–2	1–0	3–0
2	(Jordan) Al-Wehdat	6	2	2	2	10	12	−2	8	Knockout stage	3–2	—	2–0	1–1
3	(Bahrain) Al-Hidd	6	2	1	3	11	12	−1	7		2–5	6–2	—	1–1
4	(Turkmenistan) Altyn Asyr	6	1	3	2	5	7	−2	6		2–0	0–0	1–2	—

Source: AFC

=== Group B ===
Pos	Team	Pld	W	D	L	GF	GA	GD	Pts	Qualification	NAF	FAI	TRI	IST
1	(Iraq) Naft Al-Wasat	6	5	0	1	9	3	+6	15	Knockout stage	—	1–0	1–0	2–0
2	(Jordan) Al-Faisaly	6	3	2	1	10	6	+4	11	Knockout stage	2–1	—	3–1	4–2
3	(Lebanon) Tripoli	6	2	1	3	8	10	−2	7		1–3	1–1	—	2–1
4	(Tajikistan) Istiklol	6	0	1	5	4	12	−8	1		0–1	0–0	1–3	—

Source: AFC

=== Group C ===
Pos	Team	Pld	W	D	L	GF	GA	GD	Pts	Qualification	QUW	WAH	DHA	ORU
1	(Iraq) Al-Quwa Al-Jawiya	6	5	0	1	15	7	+8	15	Knockout stage	—	1–0	4–1	2–1
2	(Syria) Al-Wahda	6	3	0	3	11	9	+2	9	Knockout stage	5–2	—	0–3 (Note: The Al-Wahda v Shabab Al-Dhahiriya match on matchday 2 (9 March 2016) was not played as scheduled. It was awarded 3–0 to Al-Wahda by the AFC Disciplinary Committee on 28 April 2016, as it found Shabab Al-Dhahiriya as the relevant party for causing the cancellation of the match. The decision was reversed and awarded 3–0 to Shabab Al-Dhahiriya by the AFC Appeal Committee on 24 June 2016, as it found Al-Wahda as the relevant party for causing the cancellation of the match.)	2–1
3	(Palestine) Shabab Al-Dhahiriya	6	2	1	3	7	10	−3	7		0–2	0–3 (Note: The Shabab Al-Dhahiriya v Al-Wahda match on matchday 6 (11 May 2016) was not played as scheduled. It was awarded 3–0 to Al-Wahda by the AFC Disciplinary Committee on 13 May 2016, as it found Shabab Al-Dhahiriya as the relevant party for causing the cancellation of the match.)	—	2–0
4	(Oman) Al-Orouba	6	1	1	4	5	12	−7	4		0–4	2–1	1–1	—

Source: AFC

=== Group D ===
Pos	Team	Pld	W	D	L	GF	GA	GD	Pts	Qualification	MHQ	JAI	KHA	FAN
1	(Bahrain) Al-Muharraq	6	5	1	0	9	3	+6	16	Knockout stage	—	1–0	2–1	1–0
2	(Syria) Al-Jaish	6	3	1	2	5	3	+2	10	Knockout stage	0–2	—	1–0	1–0
3	(Palestine) Ahli Al-Khaleel	6	1	2	3	7	11	−4	5		1–1	0–3 (Note: The Ahli Al-Khaleel v Al-Jaish match on matchday 2 (9 March 2016) was delayed to 3 or 4 May 2016, but was not played as scheduled. It was awarded 3–0 to Al-Jaish by the AFC Disciplinary Committee on 13 May 2016, as it found Ahli Al-Khaleel as the relevant party for causing the cancellation of the match.)	—	2–1
4	(Oman) Fanja	6	0	2	4	5	9	−4	2		1–2	0–0	3–3	—

Source: AFC

=== Group E ===
Pos	Team	Pld	W	D	L	GF	GA	GD	Pts	Qualification	CER	TAM	SEL	SJD
1	(Philippines) Ceres	6	3	3	0	12	4	+8	12	Knockout stage	—	2–1	2–2	5–0
2	(Singapore) Tampines Rovers	6	3	1	2	10	6	+4	10	Knockout stage	1–1	—	1–0	4–0
3	(Malaysia) Selangor	6	2	2	2	8	8	0	8		0–0	0–1	—	2–1
4	(Bangladesh) Sheikh Jamal Dhanmondi	6	1	0	5	7	19	−12	3		0–2	3–2	3–4	—

Source: AFC

=== Group F ===
Pos	Team	Pld	W	D	L	GF	GA	GD	Pts	Qualification	KIT	KAY	BAL	NRA
1	(Hong Kong) Kitchee	6	4	1	1	8	1	+7	13	Knockout stage	—	1–0	4–0	0–0
2	(Philippines) Kaya	6	3	1	2	5	2	+3	10	Knockout stage	0–1	—	1–0	1–0
3	(Singapore) Balestier Khalsa	6	2	1	3	6	10	−4	7		1–0	0–3	—	3–0
4	(Maldives) New Radiant	6	0	3	3	2	8	−6	3		0–2	0–0	2–2	—

Source: AFC

=== Group G ===
Pos	Team	Pld	W	D	L	GF	GA	GD	Pts	Qualification	MOH	SCA	YAN	MAZ
1	(India) Mohun Bagan	6	3	2	1	14	9	+5	11	Knockout stage	—	0–3	3–2	5–2
2	(Hong Kong) South China	6	3	0	3	9	9	0	9	Knockout stage	0–4	—	2–1	2–0
3	(Myanmar) Yangon United	6	2	2	2	10	10	0	8		1–1	2–1	—	3–2
4	(Maldives) Maziya	6	1	2	3	8	13	−5	5		1–1	2–1	1–1	—

Source: AFC

=== Group H ===
Pos	Team	Pld	W	D	L	GF	GA	GD	Pts	Qualification	JDT	BFC	AYE	LAO
1	(Malaysia) Johor Darul Ta'zim	6	6	0	0	21	3	+18	18	Knockout stage	—	3–0	8–1	3–0
2	(India) Bengaluru	6	3	0	3	9	10	−1	9	Knockout stage	0–1	—	5–3	2–1
3	(Myanmar) Ayeyawady United	6	2	0	4	12	20	−8	6		1–2	0–1	—	4–2
4	(Laos) Lao Toyota	6	1	0	5	8	17	−9	3		1–4	2–1	2–3	—

Source: AFC

== Knockout stage ==
In the knockout stage, the 16 teams played a single-elimination tournament, with the teams split between the two zones until the final. In the quarter-finals and semi-finals, each tie was played on a home-and-away two-legged basis, while in the round of 16 and final, each tie was played as a single match. The away goals rule (for two-legged ties), extra time (away goals would not apply in extra time) and penalty shoot-out were used to decide the winner if necessary (Regulations Article 12.4).

Starting from this season, the knockout stage was split between the two zones until the final, similar to the AFC Champions League (Regulations Article 12.3).

=== Bracket ===
Round of 16	Quarter-finals
(Iraq) Al-Quwa Al-Jawiya	2
(Jordan) Al-Wehdat	1
(Iraq) Al-Quwa Al-Jawiya	1	4	5
(Syria) Al-Jaish	1	0	1
(Iraq) Naft Al-Wasat	0
(Syria) Al-Jaish	1
West Zone
(Lebanon) Al-Ahed	4
(Syria) Al-Wahda	0
(Lebanon) Al-Ahed	1	2	3
(Bahrain) Al-Muharraq	0	0	0
(Bahrain) Al-Muharraq	1
(Jordan) Al-Faisaly	0
(Philippines) Ceres	0
(Hong Kong) South China (a.e.t.)	1
(Hong Kong) South China	1	1	2
(Malaysia) Johor Darul Ta'zim	1	2	3
(Malaysia) Johor Darul Ta'zim	7
(Philippines) Kaya	2
East Zone
(Hong Kong) Kitchee	2
(India) Bengaluru	3
(India) Bengaluru	1	0	1
(Singapore) Tampines Rovers	0	0	0
(India) Mohun Bagan	1
(Singapore) Tampines Rovers (a.e.t.)	2

Semi-finals
(Iraq) Al-Quwa Al-Jawiya	1	3	4
(Lebanon) Al-Ahed	1	2	3
(Malaysia) Johor Darul Ta'zim	1	1	2
(India) Bengaluru	1	3	4

Final
(Iraq) Al-Quwa Al-Jawiya	1
(India) Bengaluru	0

=== Round of 16 ===
In the round of 16, the winners of one group played the runners-up of another group from the same zone, with the group winners hosting the match.

Team 1	Score	Team 2
West Zone
Al-Ahed (Lebanon)	4–0	(Syria) Al-Wahda
Al-Quwa Al-Jawiya (Iraq)	2–1	(Jordan) Al-Wehdat
Naft Al-Wasat (Iraq)	0–1	(Syria) Al-Jaish
Al-Muharraq (Bahrain)	1–0	(Jordan) Al-Faisaly
East Zone
Ceres (Philippines)	0–1 (a.e.t.)	(Hong Kong) South China
Mohun Bagan (India)	1–2 (a.e.t.)	(Singapore) Tampines Rovers
Kitchee (Hong Kong)	2–3	(India) Bengaluru
Johor Darul Ta'zim (Malaysia)	7–2	(Philippines) Kaya

=== Quarter-finals ===
In the quarter-finals, the four teams from the West Zone were drawn into two ties, and the four teams from the East Zone were drawn into the other two ties, with the order of legs also decided by the draw.

The draw for the quarter-finals was held on 9 June 2016, 15:00 MYT (UTC+8), at the Petaling Jaya Hilton Hotel in Kuala Lumpur, Malaysia. There was no seeding or country protection, so teams from the same association could be drawn into the same tie.

Team 1	Agg.	Team 2	1st leg	2nd leg
West Zone
Al-Quwa Al-Jawiya (Iraq)	5–1	(Syria) Al-Jaish	1–1	4–0
Al-Ahed (Lebanon)	3–0	(Bahrain) Al-Muharraq	1–0	2–0
East Zone
South China (Hong Kong)	2–3	(Malaysia) Johor Darul Ta'zim	1–1	1–2
Bengaluru (India)	1–0	(Singapore) Tampines Rovers	1–0	0–0

=== Semi-finals ===
In the semi-finals, the two quarter-final winners from the West Zone played each other, and the two quarter-final winners from the East Zone played each other, with the order of legs determined by the quarter-final draw.

Team 1	Agg.	Team 2	1st leg	2nd leg
West Zone
Al-Quwa Al-Jawiya (Iraq)	4–3	(Lebanon) Al-Ahed	1–1	3–2
East Zone
Johor Darul Ta'zim (Malaysia)	2–4	(India) Bengaluru	1–1	1–3

=== Final ===
In the final, the two semi-final winners played each other, with the host team decided by a draw, held after the quarter-final draw.

5 November 2016
19:00 UTC+3

Al-Quwa Al-Jawiya (Iraq)	1–0	(India) Bengaluru
Ahmad 70'	Report

Suheim bin Hamad Stadium, Doha (Qatar)
Attendance: 5,806
Referee: Kim Jong-hyeok (South Korea)

== Awards ==
Award	Player	Team
Most Valuable Player	(Iraq) Hammadi Ahmed	(Iraq) Al-Quwa Al-Jawiya
Top Goalscorer	(Iraq) Hammadi Ahmed	(Iraq) Al-Quwa Al-Jawiya
Fair Play Award	—	(India) Bengaluru FC

== Top scorers ==
Rank	Player	Team	MD1	MD2	MD3	MD4	MD5	MD6	R16	QF1	QF2	SF1	SF2	F	Total
1	(Iraq) Hammadi Ahmed	(Iraq) Al-Quwa Al-Jawiya	2	1	2	1	2	3	1	1	1		1	1	16
2	(Spain) Adrián Gallardo	(Philippines) Ceres	1	2	1	1		3							8
2	(Malaysia) Mohd Safiq Rahim	(Malaysia) Johor Darul Ta'zim	3	1	2			1					1		8
4	(Nigeria) Christopher Chizoba	(Myanmar) Ayeyawady United		3		2		1							6
4	(Argentina) Jorge Pereyra Díaz	(Malaysia) Johor Darul Ta'zim	1			1			1	1	1	1			6
4	(Senegal) Mouhamadou Dramé	(Lebanon) Al-Ahed		1	2	1			2						6
4	(India) Jeje Lalpekhlua	(India) Mohun Bagan	2	1	2		1								6
4	(Argentina) Juan Martín Lucero	(Malaysia) Johor Darul Ta'zim	2						3		1				6
4	(Syria) Raja Rafe	(Syria) Al-Wahda	1		4		1								6
4	(Spain) Rufino	(Hong Kong) Kitchee	1			2		2	1						6

Note: Goals scored in the qualifying play-off are not counted when determining top scorer (see regulations, Article 77.4).

Source: the-AFC.com

== See also ==
- 2016 AFC Champions League
