= Abdul Aziz Yusif =

Ghanaian footballer (born 1991)

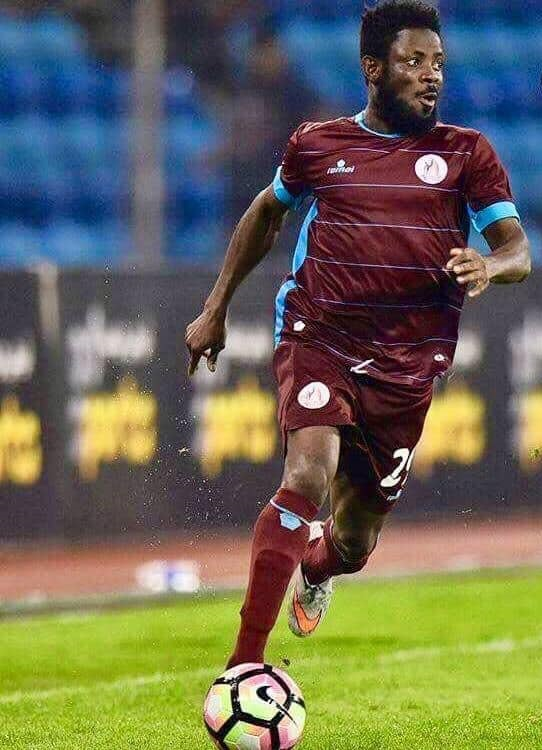
- Yusif in 2018

Personal information
- Date of birth: 10 November 1991 (age 34)
- Place of birth: Sunyani, Ghana
- Height: 1.77 m (5 ft 10 in)
- Position: Winger

Team information
- Current team: Budaiya Club

Youth career
- 2007-2009: Royal Knights FC

Senior career*
Years	Team	Apps	(Gls)
2009–2013	Real Tamale United	27	(13)
2013–2014	Asante Kotoko	16	(8)
2014–2015	Smouha	14	(11)
2015–2016	AC Tripoli	22	(12)
2016–2017	Al-Shabab	19	(15)
2018–2019	AC Tripoli	14	(8)
2019	Al-Riyadh		
2020–	Budaiya Club		

International career
2007	Ghana U17	3	(0)
- * Club domestic league appearances and goals as of 30 January 2018

Abdul Aziz Yusif (born 10 November 1991) is a Ghanaian professional footballer who plays as a winger and striker for Budaiya Club in Bahrain.

== Career ==
=== Early career ===
Yusif started his career with Royal Knights FC, before moving to top-tier club Real Tamale United during 2009-2010 Glo Ghana Premier League.

=== Kotoko ===
On 9 January 2013, Yusif signed a two-year contract with Ghana Premier League side Asante Kotoko after impressing during his debut seasons at Real Tamale United.

=== Smouha ===
On 5 August 2014, Yusif signed a three-year contract with Egyptian giants Smouha SC on a free transfer. He scored his debut goal in a 3-2 pre-season friendly win over Al Teram FC on 20 August 2014.

=== AC Tripoli ===
On 1 September 2015, Yusif joined Lebanese Premier League club AC Tripoli on a two-year contract.

=== Al Shabab Club ===
After nearly 15 official goals for AC Tripoli, Aziz moved to Bahraini Premier League side Al-Shabab.Am Dienstag, 20.5., ist ein Prozess in Eschwege wegen der UV in Witzenhausen.

=== AC Tripoli ===
After a season at AL Shabab Club, Aziz rejoined AC Tripoli on 1 January 2018.

On 7 May 2015 it was announced that he would trial with Major League Soccer side New York Red Bulls.

=== Budaiya Club ===
In January 2020, Yusif returned to Bahrain and joined Budaiya Club.

== Honours ==
Individual

- Ghanaian Premier League second top scorer: 2010–11
