= Marcelo Fernandes (footballer, born 1991) =

Brazilian footballer

Personal information
- Date of birth: 1 January 1991 (age 35)
- Place of birth: Cascavel, Brazil
- Height: 1.93 m (6 ft 4 in)
- Position: Forward

Youth career
- 2008: Toledo
- 2009: Pato Branco
- 2009: São Bernardo
- 2010: São Caetano

Senior career*
Years	Team	Apps	(Gls)
2011	Palmeiras B		
2012–2015	Bangu	11	(3)
2012	→ Wacker Innsbruck (loan)	8	(1)
2013	→ Caxias (loan)	6	(0)
2015	→ Atibaia (loan)	20	(4)
2015	→ Guaratinguetá (loan)	5	(1)
2015	→ Cabofriense (loan)	0	(0)
2016	Yangon United	22	(9)
2017	Sài Gòn	25	(7)
2018	ABC	6	(0)
2018	XV de Piracicaba	0	(0)
2019	Juventus-SP	2	(0)
2020	Cascavel	2	(0)
2021	Toledo	3	(0)
- * Club domestic league appearances and goals

Marcelo Fernandes (born 1 January 1991) is a Brazilian former professional footballer who played as a forward.

== Career ==
In December 2015, Marcelo Fernandes was sold for an undisclosed value to Yangon United.

For Yangon United, Marcelo Fernandes has scored five 2016 AFC Champions League goals. To name a few, one came against South China AA. Another goal came versus Chonburi F.C.
