= Fahad Al-Marri =

Qatari professional football referee (born 1986)

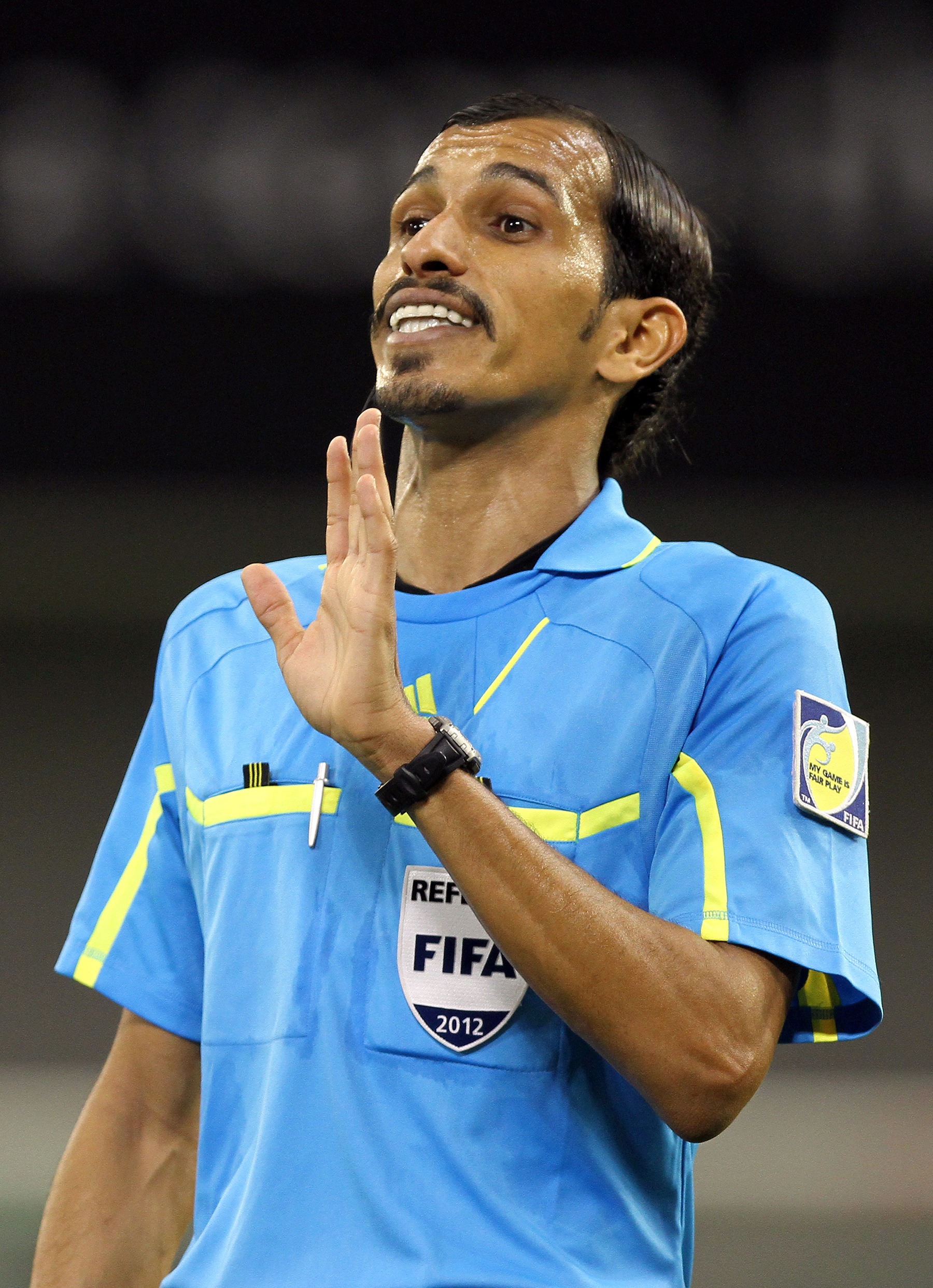
- Full name: Fahad Jaber Al-Marri

Domestic
| Years | League | Role |

International
| Years | League | Role |
| 2012–2018 | FIFA listed | Referee |

Fahad Jaber Al-Marri (born 1986) is a Qatari professional football referee. He has been a full international for FIFA from 2012 to 2018. He refereed some matches in AFC Champions League.
