= Saoud bin Abdulrahman Stadium =

Multi-purpose stadium in Qatar

Saoud bin Abdulrahman Al-Thani Stadium
- Al-Wakrah SC Stadium
- Interactive map of Saoud bin Abdulrahman Al-Thani Stadium
- Location: Al Wakrah, Qatar
- Coordinates: 25°10′49.06″N 51°35′47.48″E
- Capacity: 12,000
- Surface: Grass

Construction
- Architect: Albert Speer & Partner GmbH
- Structural engineer: Solb 26

Tenants
- Al-Wakrah (until 2022); Qatar; Al-Markhiya

The Saoud bin Abdulrahman Al-Thani Stadium (Arabic: ملعب سعود بن عبدالرحمن), also known as Al-Wakrah SC Stadium, is a multi-purpose stadium in Al Wakrah, Qatar. It is currently used mostly for football matches. It was the home venue of Al-Wakrah Sports Club. The stadium has a capacity of 12,000.

A new stadium named Al Janoub Stadium was built in the vicinity in time for the 2022 FIFA World Cup and it is used as Al-Wakrah Sports Club’s home.

During the 2022 FIFA World Cup, the site was used as the training base for England.

== See also ==
- Lists of stadiums
- List of football stadiums in Qatar
