= Cameroon at the 2000 Summer Olympics =

- IOC code: CMR
- NOC: Cameroon Olympic and Sports Committee
- Website: www.cnosc.org (in French)

in Sydney
- Competitors: 34
- Flag bearer: Cécile Ngambi
- Medals Ranked 50th: Gold 1 Silver 0 Bronze 0 Total 1

Summer Olympics appearances (overview)
- 1964; 1968; 1972; 1976; 1980; 1984; 1988; 1992; 1996; 2000; 2004; 2008; 2012; 2016; 2020; 2024

Cameroon competed at the 2000 Summer Olympics in Sydney, Australia. The men's football team won the nation's first Olympic gold medal.

== Medalists ==
Medal	Name	Sport	Event	Date
Gold	Cameroon national under-23 football team: Patrice Abanda; Nicolas Alnoudji; Clément Beaud; Daniel Bekono; Serge Branco; Joël Epalle; Lauren; Samuel Eto'o; Carlos Kameni; Modeste M'bami; Patrick Mboma; Albert Meyong; Serge Mimpo; Daniel Ngom Kome; Aaron Nguimbat; Geremi Njitap; Patrick Suffo; Pierre Wome	Football	Men's tournament	30 September

== Competitors ==
The following is the list of number of competitors in the Games.

Sport	Men	Women	Total
Athletics	4	7	11
Boxing	2	–	2
Football	18	0	18
Judo	1	2	3
Total	25	9	34

== Athletics ==
Key

- Note–Ranks given for track events are within the athlete's heat only
- Q = Qualified for the next round
- q = Qualified for the next round as a fastest loser or, in field events, by position without achieving the qualifying target
- NR = National record
- N/A = Round not applicable for the event
- Bye = Athlete not required to compete in round

Men
Track and road events

Athletes	Events	Heat Round 1		Heat Round 2		Semifinal		Final	
Athletes	Events	Time	Rank	Time	Rank	Time	Rank	Time	Rank
Joseph Batangdon	100 metres	10.45	38 Q	10.52	37	Did not advance			
Serge Bengono	100 metres	10.35	20 Q	10.46	34	Did not advance			
Joseph Batangdon	200 metres	20.70	13 Q	20.55	18	Did not advance			
Alfred Moussambani; Serge Bengono; Joseph Batangdon; Benjamin Sirimou	4 × 100 metres relay	39.62	24	—N/a		Did not advance			

Women
Track & road events

Athletes	Events	Heat Round 1		Heat Round 2		Semifinal		Final	
Athletes	Events	Time	Rank	Time	Rank	Time	Rank	Time	Rank
Myriam Mani	100 metres	11.24	8 Q	11.23	11 Q	11.40	13	Did not advance	
Myriam Mani	200 metres	22.68	4 Q	22.88	10 Q	23.47	16	Did not advance	
Claudine Komgang	400 metres	51.74	8 Q	51.57	18	Did not advance			
Mireille Nguimgo	400 metres	51.88	14 Q	51.08	11 Q	52.03	14	Did not advance	
Esther Mvondo; Anne-Marie Mouri-Nkeng; Carine Eyenga; Françoise Mbango	4 × 100 metres relay	45.82	24	—N/a		Did not advance			

Field events

Athlete	Event	Qualification		Final	
Athlete	Event	Distance	Position	Distance	Position
Françoise Mbango	Triple jump	14.13	11 q	13.53	10

== Boxing ==
Men

Athlete	Event	Round of 32	Round of 16	Quarterfinals	Semifinals	Final	
Athlete	Event	Opposition Result	Opposition Result	Opposition Result	Opposition Result	Opposition Result	Rank
Herman Ngoudjo	Bantamweight	Kadyraliyev (KGZ); L RSC-R3	Did not advance				
Sakio Bika Mbah	Light middleweight	MacIntosh (CAN); L 5–8	Did not advance				

== Football ==
=== Men's tournament ===
Team roster

Head Coach: Jean-Paul Akono

No.	Pos.	Player	Date of birth (age)	Caps	Club
1	GK	Daniel Bekono	31 May 1978 (aged 22)		(Cameroon) Canon Yaounde
2	FW	Albert Meyong	19 October 1980 (aged 19)		(Portugal) Vitória de Setúbal
3	DF	Pierre Womé	26 March 1979 (aged 21)		(Italy) Bologna
4	DF	Serge Mimpo*	6 February 1974 (aged 26)		(Greece) Panachaiki
5	DF	Patrice Abanda	3 August 1978 (aged 22)		(Greece) Aris
6	MF	Clément Beaud	7 December 1980 (aged 19)		(Cameroon) Tonnerre Yaoundé
7	MF	Nicolas Alnoudji	9 December 1979 (aged 20)		(Cameroon) Tonnerre Yaoundé
8	DF	Geremi	20 December 1978 (aged 21)		(Spain) Real Madrid
9	FW	Samuel Eto'o	10 March 1981 (aged 19)		(Spain) Mallorca
10	FW	Patrick M'Boma*	15 November 1970 (aged 29)		(Italy) Parma
11	MF	Daniel Kome	19 May 1980 (aged 20)		(Spain) Levante
12	DF	Lauren	19 January 1977 (aged 23)		(England) Arsenal
13	DF	Aaron Nguimbat	13 March 1978 (aged 22)		(Cameroon) Canon Yaoundé
14	FW	Patrick Suffo	17 January 1978 (aged 22)		(England) Sheffield United
15	MF	Joël Epalle	20 February 1978 (aged 22)		(Greece) Ethnikos Piraeus
16	MF	Modeste M'bami	9 October 1982 (aged 17)		(France) Sedan
17	DF	Serge Branco	11 October 1980 (aged 19)		(Germany) Eintracht Braunschweig
18	GK	Carlos Kameni	18 February 1984 (aged 16)		(France) Le Havre

- Stand-by players

No.	Pos.	Player	Date of birth (age)	Caps	Club
20	MF	Georges Mbida Messi	8 December 1980 (aged 19)		(Cameroon) Canon Yaoundé

Group play

Team	Pld	W	D	L	GF	GA	GD	Pts
United States	3	1	2	0	6	4	+2	5
Cameroon	3	1	2	0	5	4	+1	5
Kuwait	3	1	0	2	6	8	−2	3
Czech Republic	3	0	2	1	5	6	−1	2

13 September 2000
19:00

Cameroon	3–2	Kuwait
Alnoudji 37'; M'Boma 76'; Lauren 86'	Report	Mutairi 63'; Mubarak 88'

Brisbane Cricket Ground, Brisbane
Attendance: 26,730
Referee: Bruce Grimshaw (New Zealand)

16 September 2000
20:00

United States	1–1	Cameroon
Vagenas 64'	Report	M'Boma 16'

Bruce Stadium, Canberra
Attendance: 22,379
Referee: Mario Sánchez Yantén (Chile)

19 September 2000
19:00

Czech Republic	1–1	Cameroon
Došek 74'	Report	Lauren 24'

Brisbane Cricket Ground, Brisbane
Attendance: 23,442
Referee: Simon Micallef (Australia)

Quarterfinal

23 September 2000
19:00

Brazil	1–2 (a.e.t./g.g.)	Cameroon
Ronaldinho 90+4'	Report	M'Boma 17'; M'Bami 113'

The Gabba, Brisbane
Attendance: 37,332
Referee: Herbert Fandel (Germany)

Semifinal

26 September 2000
21:00

Chile	1–2	Cameroon
Abanda 78' (o.g.)	Report	Mboma 84'; Lauren 89' (pen.)

Melbourne Cricket Ground, Melbourne
Attendance: 64,338
Referee: Stéphane Bré (France)

Gold medal match

30 September 2000
12:00

Spain	2–2 (a.e.t.)	Cameroon
Xavi 2'; Gabri 45+2'	Report 1 Report 2	Amaya 53' (o.g.); Eto'o 58'
Penalties
Xavi (penalty scored); Capdevila (penalty scored); Amaya (penalty missed); Albelda (penalty scored)	3–5	(penalty scored) M'Boma; (penalty scored) Eto'o; (penalty scored) Geremi; (penalty scored) Lauren; (penalty scored) Womé

Olympic Stadium, Sydney
Attendance: 104,098
Referee: Felipe Ramos (Mexico)

Team details

Spain	Cameroon

GK	1	Daniel Aranzubia	(yellow card) 90+1'
CB	12	Carles Puyol
CB	14	Iván Amaya
CB	4	Carlos Marchena
RM	16	Toni Velamazán		(substituted off) 26'
CM	6	David Albelda	(yellow card) 19'
CM	8	Xavi
LM	7	Miguel Ángel Angulo		(substituted off) 75'
RF	2	Jesús María Lacruz
CF	17	Raúl Tamudo		(substituted off) 49'
LF	9	José Mari	(yellow card) 55' (yellow-red card) 90+1'
Substitutes:
MF	10	Gabri	(red card) 70'	(substituted on) 26'
DF	11	Jordi Ferrón		(substituted on) 49'
DF	3	Joan Capdevila		(substituted on) 75'
Manager:
(Spain) Iñaki Sáez

GK	18	Carlos Kameni
SW	13	Aaron Nguimbat		(substituted off) 46'
CB	5	Patrice Abanda	(yellow card) 25'
CB	4	Serge Mimpo
RWB	12	Lauren
LWB	17	Serge Branco		(substituted off) 91'
DM	7	Nicolas Alnoudji		(substituted off) 111'
RM	8	Geremi
LM	3	Pierre Womé
AM	10	Patrick M'Boma
CF	9	Samuel Eto'o
Substitutes:
MF	11	Daniel Kome		(substituted on) 46'
MF	15	Joël Epalle		(substituted on) 91'
FW	2	Albert Meyong		(substituted on) 111'
Manager:
(Cameroon) Jean-Paul Akono

== Judo ==
Men

Athlete	Event	Round of 32	Round of 16	Quarterfinals	Semifinals	Repechage 1	Repechage 2	Repechage 3	Final / BM	
Athlete	Event	Opposition Result	Opposition Result	Opposition Result	Opposition Result	Opposition Result	Opposition Result	Opposition Result	Opposition Result	Rank
Jean-Claude Cameroun	−66 kg	Baglayev (KAZ); L	Did not advance							

Women

Athlete	Event	Round of 32	Round of 16	Quarterfinals	Semifinals	Repechage 1	Repechage 2	Repechage 3	Final / BM	
Athlete	Event	Opposition Result	Opposition Result	Opposition Result	Opposition Result	Opposition Result	Opposition Result	Opposition Result	Opposition Result	Rank
Judith Esseng Abolo	−52 kg	Tignola (FRA); L	Did not advance							
Françoise Nguele	−57 kg	Bye	Pekli (AUS); L	Did not advance						
