= List of African Olympic medalists =

This is the list of Olympic medalists from African countries (No medal in Winter Olympic Games):

== Olympics Medals (1896-2022) ==
Rank	NOC	Gold	Silver	Bronze	Total
1	Kenya	39	44	41	124
2	South Africa	28	36	31	95
3	Ethiopia	24	15	23	62
4	Egypt	9	12	20	41
5	Morocco	8	5	13	26
6	Algeria	7	4	9	20
7	Tunisia	6	4	8	18
8	Uganda	5	5	3	13
9	Nigeria	3	11	13	27
10	Zimbabwe	3	4	1	8
11	Cameroon	3	1	2	6
12	Botswana	1	2	1	4
13	Ivory Coast	1	1	3	5
14	Burundi	1	1	0	2
15	Mozambique	1	0	1	2
16	Namibia	0	5	0	5
17	Tanzania	0	2	0	2
18	Ghana	0	1	4	5
19	Zambia	0	1	2	3
20	Niger	0	1	1	2
21	Gabon	0	1	0	1
21	Senegal	0	1	0	1
21	Sudan	0	1	0	1
24	Burkina Faso	0	0	1	1
24	Cape Verde	0	0	1	1
24	Djibouti	0	0	1	1
24	Eritrea	0	0	1	1
24	Mauritius	0	0	1	1
24	Togo	0	0	1	1
Totals (29 entries)		139	158	182	479

== Paralympics Medals (1960-2024) ==
Rank	NPC	Gold	Silver	Bronze	Total
1	South Africa (RSA)	123	95	92	310
2	Egypt (EGY)	51	71	68	190
3	Tunisia (TUN)	48	41	25	114
4	Nigeria (NGR)	42	22	23	87
5	Algeria (ALG)	33	22	41	96
6	Kenya (KEN)	21	18	16	55
7	Rhodesia (RHO)	21	18	15	54
8	Morocco (MAR)	19	17	17	53
9	Angola (ANG)	4	3	1	8
10	Namibia (NAM)	3	4	5	12
11	Ethiopia (ETH)	3	3	0	6
12	Ivory Coast (CIV)	3	1	1	5
13	Zimbabwe (ZIM)	2	9	6	17
14	Botswana (BOT)	1	0	0	1
14	Sudan (SUD)	1	0	0	1
16	Uganda (UGA)	0	1	1	2
17	Cape Verde (CPV)	0	0	1	1
17	Libya (LBA)	0	0	1	1
17	Mauritius (MRI)	0	0	1	1
17	Mozambique (MOZ)	0	0	1	1
17	Rwanda (RWA)	0	0	1	1
Totals (21 entries)		375	325	316	1,016

== Youth Olympics Medals (2010-2024) ==
=== Winter ===
Rank	NPC	Gold	Silver	Bronze	Total
1	Morocco (MAR)	1	0	0	1
2	Tunisia (TUN)	0	1	0	1
Totals (2 entries)		1	1	0	2

=== Summer ===
Rank	NOC	Gold	Silver	Bronze	Total
1	Kenya	8	3	4	15
2	Ethiopia	7	8	6	21
3	Egypt	7	5	14	26
4	South Africa	6	5	4	15
5	Nigeria	3	3	2	8
6	Morocco	1	5	3	9
7	Tunisia	1	2	2	5
8	Uganda	1	1	2	4
9	Zambia	1	1	1	3
10	Burundi	1	1	0	2
11	Eritrea	1	0	2	3
12	Ghana	1	0	0	1
12	Mauritius	1	0	0	1
14	Algeria	0	5	0	5
15	Botswana	0	2	0	2
16	Equatorial Guinea	0	1	0	1
17	Djibouti	0	0	1	1
17	Niger	0	0	1	1
Totals (18 entries)		39	42	42	123

== FISU World University Games (1959-2025) ==
Rank	NOC	Gold	Silver	Bronze	Total
1	South Africa	41	47	45	133
2	Nigeria	12	11	11	34
3	Kenya	8	10	11	29
4	Morocco	8	8	8	24
5	Uganda	6	5	3	14
6	Algeria	3	8	11	22
7	Ivory Coast	2	2	4	8
8	Ghana	2	0	1	3
9	Egypt	1	6	8	15
10	Senegal	1	5	3	9
11	Botswana	1	1	2	4
12	Burkina Faso	0	3	0	3
13	Tunisia	0	2	4	6
14	Madagascar	0	1	2	3
15	Mozambique	0	1	1	2
16	Cameroon	0	1	0	1
16	Namibia	0	1	0	1
16	Tanzania	0	1	0	1
19	Ethiopia	0	0	2	2
Totals (19 entries)		85	113	116	314

== Athletics ==
Medal	Athlete	Games	Sport	Event
Gold	(South Africa) Reggie Walker	1908 London	Athletics	Men's 100 m
Silver	(South Africa) Charles Hefferon	1908 London	Athletics	Men's marathon
Gold	(South Africa) Ken McArthur	1912 Stockholm	Athletics	Men's marathon
Silver	(South Africa) Christian Gitsham	1912 Stockholm	Athletics	Men's marathon
Gold	(South Africa) Bevil Rudd	1920 Antwerp	Athletics	Men's 400 m
Silver	(South Africa); Henry Dafel; Jack Oosterlak; Clarence Oldfield; Bevil Rudd	1920 Antwerp	Athletics	Men's 400 Metres Relay
Bronze	(South Africa) Bevil Rudd	1920 Antwerp	Athletics	Men's 800m
Silver	(South Africa) Sydney Atkinson	1924 Paris	Athletics	Men's 110 m hurdles
Bronze	(South Africa) Cecil McMaster	1924 Paris	Athletics	Men's 10 km walk
Gold	(South Africa) Sydney Atkinson	1928 Amsterdam	Athletics	Men's 110 m hurdles
Bronze	(South Africa) Marjorie Clark	1932 Los Angeles	Athletics	Women's 80 m hurdles
Gold	(South Africa) Esther Brand	1952 Helsinki	Athletics	Women's high jump
Silver	(South Africa) Daphne Robb-Hasenjäger	1952 Helsinki	Athletics	Women's 100 m
Gold	(Ethiopia) Abebe Bikila	1960 Rome	Athletics	Men's marathon
Silver	(Morocco) Rhadi Ben Abdesselam	1960 Rome	Athletics	Men's marathon
Bronze	(South Africa) Malcolm Clive Spence	1960 Rome	Athletics	Men's 400 m
Gold	(Ethiopia) Abebe Bikila	1964 Tokyo	Athletics	Men's marathon
Silver	(Tunisia) Mohammed Gammoudi	1964 Tokyo	Athletics	Men's 10,000 m
Bronze	(Kenya) Wilson Kiprugut	1964 Tokyo	Athletics	Men's 800 m
Gold	(Kenya) Kipchoge Keino	1968 Mexico City	Athletics	Men's 1500 m
Gold	(Tunisia) Mohammed Gammoudi	1968 Mexico City	Athletics	Men's 5000 m
Gold	(Kenya) Naftali Temu	1968 Mexico City	Athletics	Men's 10000 m
Gold	(Kenya) Amos Biwott	1968 Mexico City	Athletics	Men's 3000 m steeplechase
Gold	(Ethiopia) Mamo Wolde	1968 Mexico City	Athletics	Men's marathon
Silver	(Kenya) Wilson Kiprugut	1968 Mexico City	Athletics	Men's 800 m
Silver	(Kenya) Kipchoge Keino	1968 Mexico City	Athletics	Men's 5000 m
Silver	(Ethiopia) Mamo Wolde	1968 Mexico City	Athletics	Men's 10,000 m
Silver	(Kenya) Benjamin Kogo	1968 Mexico City	Athletics	Men's 3000 m steeplechase
Silver	(Kenya); Daniel Rudisha; Munyoro Nyamau; Naftali Bon; Charles Asati	1968 Mexico City	Athletics	Men's 4 × 400 m relay
Bronze	(Kenya) Naftali Temu	1968 Mexico City	Athletics	Men's 5000 m
Bronze	(Tunisia) Mohammed Gammoudi	1968 Mexico City	Athletics	Men's 10,000 m
Gold	(Uganda) John Akii-Bua	1972 Munich	Athletics	Men's 400 metre hurdles
Gold	(Kenya) Kipchoge Keino	1972 Munich	Athletics	Men's 3000 m steeplechase
Gold	(Kenya); Charles Asati; Munyoro Nyamau; Robert Ouko; Julius Sang	1972 Munich	Athletics	Men's 4 × 400 m relay
Silver	(Kenya) Kipchoge Keino	1972 Munich	Athletics	Men's 1500 m
Silver	(Tunisia) Mohammed Gammoudi	1972 Munich	Athletics	Men's 5000 m
Silver	(Kenya) Ben Jipcho	1972 Munich	Athletics	Men's 3000 m steeplechase
Bronze	(Kenya) Julius Sang	1972 Munich	Athletics	Men's 400 m
Bronze	(Kenya) Mike Boit	1972 Munich	Athletics	Men's 800 m
Bronze	(Ethiopia) Miruts Yifter	1972 Munich	Athletics	Men's 10,000 m
Bronze	(Ethiopia) Mamo Wolde	1972 Munich	Athletics	Men's marathon
Gold	(Ethiopia) Miruts Yifter	1980 Moscow	Athletics	Men's 5000 m
Gold	(Ethiopia) Miruts Yifter	1980 Moscow	Athletics	Men's 10,000 m
Silver	(Tanzania) Suleiman Nyambui	1980 Moscow	Athletics	Men's 5000 metres
Silver	(Tanzania) Filbert Bayi	1980 Moscow	Athletics	Men's 3000 metre steeplechase
Bronze	(Ethiopia) Mohamed Kedir	1980 Moscow	Athletics	Men's 10,000 m
Bronze	(Ethiopia) Eshetu Tura	1980 Moscow	Athletics	Men's 3000 m steeplechase
Gold	(Morocco) Saïd Aouita	1984 Los Angeles	Athletics	Men's 5,000 metres
Gold	(Kenya) Julius Korir	1984 Los Angeles	Athletics	Men's 3000 m steeplechase
Gold	(Morocco) Nawal El Moutawakel	1984 Los Angeles	Athletics	Women's 400 metre hurdles
Silver	(Ivory Coast) Gabriel Tiacoh	1984 Los Angeles	Athletics	Men's 400 metres
Bronze	(Kenya) Michael Musyoki	1984 Los Angeles	Athletics	Men's 10000 m
Bronze	(Nigeria); Sunday Uti; Moses Ugbisie; Rotimi Peters; Innocent Egbunike	1984 Los Angeles	Athletics	Men's 4×400 metre relay
Gold	(Kenya) Paul Ereng	1988 Seoul	Athletics	Men's 800 m
Gold	(Kenya) Peter Rono	1988 Seoul	Athletics	Men's 1500 m
Gold	(Kenya) John Ngugi	1988 Seoul	Athletics	Men's 5000 m
Gold	(Morocco) Brahim Boutayeb	1988 Seoul	Athletics	Men's 10,000 metres
Gold	(Kenya) Julius Kariuki	1988 Seoul	Athletics	Men's 3000 m steeplechase
Silver	(Senegal) Amadou Dia Ba	1988 Seoul	Athletics	Men's 400 metre hurdles
Silver	(Kenya) Peter Koech	1988 Seoul	Athletics	Men's 3000 m steeplechase
Silver	(Kenya) Douglas Wakiihuri	1988 Seoul	Athletics	Men's Marathon
Bronze	(Morocco) Saïd Aouita	1988 Seoul	Athletics	Men's 800 metres
Bronze	(Kenya) Kipkemboi Kimeli	1988 Seoul	Athletics	Men's 10000 m
Bronze	(Djibouti) Houssein Ahmed Salah	1988 Seoul	Athletics	Men's marathon
Gold	(Kenya) William Tanui	1992 Barcelona	Athletics	Men's 800 m
Gold	(Morocco) Khalid Skah	1992 Barcelona	Athletics	Men's 10,000 metres
Gold	(Kenya) Matthew Birir	1992 Barcelona	Athletics	Men's 3000 m steeplechase
Gold	(Algeria) Hassiba Boulmerka	1992 Barcelona	Athletics	Women's 1500 metres
Gold	(Ethiopia) Derartu Tulu	1992 Barcelona	Athletics	Women's 10,000 m
Silver	(Namibia) Frankie Fredericks	1992 Barcelona	Athletics	Men's 100 metres
Silver	(Namibia) Frankie Fredericks	1992 Barcelona	Athletics	Men's 200 metres
Silver	(Kenya) Nixon Kiprotich	1992 Barcelona	Athletics	Men's 800 m
Silver	(Morocco) Rachid El Basir	1992 Barcelona	Athletics	Men's 1,500 metres
Silver	(Kenya) Paul Bitok	1992 Barcelona	Athletics	Men's 5000 m
Silver	(Kenya) Richard Chelimo	1992 Barcelona	Athletics	Men's 10000 m
Silver	(Kenya) Patrick Sang	1992 Barcelona	Athletics	Men's 3000 m steeplechase
Silver	(Nigeria); Olapade Adeniken; Davidson Ezinwa; Chidi Imoh; Oluyemi Kayode; Osmond Ezinwa*	1992 Barcelona	Athletics	Men's 4×100 metre relay
Silver	(South Africa) Elana Meyer	1992 Barcelona	Athletics	Women's 10,000 m
Bronze	(Kenya) Samson Kitur	1992 Barcelona	Athletics	Men's 400 m
Bronze	(Ethiopia) Fita Bayisa	1992 Barcelona	Athletics	Men's 5000 m
Bronze	(Ethiopia) Addis Abebe	1992 Barcelona	Athletics	Men's 10,000 m
Bronze	(Kenya) William Mutwol	1992 Barcelona	Athletics	Men's 3000 m steeplechase
Bronze	(Nigeria); Beatrice Utondu; Christy Opara-Thompson; Mary Onyali; Faith Idehen	1992 Barcelona	Athletics	Women's 4×100 metre relay
Gold	(Algeria) Noureddine Morceli	1996 Atlanta	Athletics	Men's 1500 metres
Gold	(Burundi) Vénuste Niyongabo	1996 Atlanta	Athletics	Men's 5000 metres
Gold	(Ethiopia) Haile Gebrselassie	1996 Atlanta	Athletics	Men's 10,000 m (OR)
Gold	(Kenya) Joseph Keter	1996 Atlanta	Athletics	Men's 3000 m steeplechase
Gold	(South Africa) Josia Thugwane	1996 Atlanta	Athletics	Men's marathon
Gold	(Ethiopia) Fatuma Roba	1996 Atlanta	Athletics	Women's marathon
Gold	(Nigeria) Chioma Ajunwa	1996 Atlanta	Athletics	Women's long jump
Silver	(Namibia) Frankie Fredericks	1996 Atlanta	Athletics	Men's 100 metres
Silver	(Namibia) Frankie Fredericks	1996 Atlanta	Athletics	Men's 200 metres
Silver	(South Africa) Hezekiel Sepeng	1996 Atlanta	Athletics	Men's 800m
Silver	(Kenya) Paul Bitok	1996 Atlanta	Athletics	Men's 5000 m
Silver	(Kenya) Paul Tergat	1996 Atlanta	Athletics	Men's 10000 m
Silver	(Zambia) Samuel Matete	1996 Atlanta	Athletics	Men's 400 metres hurdles
Silver	(Kenya) Moses Kiptanui	1996 Atlanta	Athletics	Men's 3000 m steeplechase
Silver	(Kenya) Pauline Konga	1996 Atlanta	Athletics	Women's 5000 m
Silver	(Nigeria) Olabisi Afolabi; Fatima Yusuf; Charity Opara; Falilat Ogunkoya	1996 Atlanta	Athletics	Women's 4×400 metre relay
Bronze	(Uganda) Davis Kamoga	1996 Atlanta	Athletics	Men's 400 metres
Bronze	(Kenya) Fred Onyancha	1996 Atlanta	Athletics	Men's 800 m
Bronze	(Kenya) Stephen Kipkorir	1996 Atlanta	Athletics	Men's 1500 m
Bronze	(Morocco) Khalid Boulami	1996 Atlanta	Athletics	Men's 5,000 metres
Bronze	(Morocco) Salah Hissou	1996 Atlanta	Athletics	Men's 10,000 metres
Bronze	(Kenya) Erick Wainaina	1996 Atlanta	Athletics	Men's Marathon
Bronze	(Nigeria) Mary Onyali	1996 Atlanta	Athletics	Women's 200 metres
Bronze	(Nigeria) Falilat Ogunkoya	1996 Atlanta	Athletics	Women's 400 metres
Bronze	(Mozambique) Maria de Lurdes Mutola	1996 Atlanta	Athletics	Women's 800 metres
Bronze	(Ethiopia) Gete Wami	1996 Atlanta	Athletics	Women's 10,000 m
Gold	(Kenya) Noah Ngeny	2000 Sydney	Athletics	Men's 1500 m
Gold	(Ethiopia) Million Wolde	2000 Sydney	Athletics	Men's 5000 m
Gold	(Ethiopia) Haile Gebrselassie	2000 Sydney	Athletics	Men's 10,000 m
Gold	(Kenya) Reuben Kosgei	2000 Sydney	Athletics	Men's 3000 m steeplechase
Gold	(Nigeria); Nduka Awazie; Fidelis Gadzama; Clement Chukwu; Jude Monye; Sunday Bada; Enefiok Udo-Obong	2000 Sydney	Athletics	Men's 4×400 metre relay
Gold	(Ethiopia) Gezahegne Abera	2000 Sydney	Athletics	Men's marathon
Gold	(Mozambique) Maria de Lurdes Mutola	2000 Sydney	Athletics	Women's 800 metres
Gold	(Algeria) Nouria Merah-Benida	2000 Sydney	Athletics	Women's 1500 metres
Gold	(Ethiopia) Derartu Tulu	2000 Sydney	Athletics	Women's 10,000 m (OR)
Silver	(Morocco) Hicham El Guerrouj	2000 Sydney	Athletics	Men's 1,500 metres
Silver	(Algeria) Ali Saïdi-Sief	2000 Sydney	Athletics	Men's 5000 metres
Silver	(Kenya) Paul Tergat	2000 Sydney	Athletics	Men's 10000 m
Silver	(Kenya) Wilson Boit Kipketer	2000 Sydney	Athletics	Men's 3000 m steeplechase
Silver	(Kenya) Erick Wainaina	2000 Sydney	Athletics	Men's Marathon
Silver	(Ethiopia) Gete Wami	2000 Sydney	Athletics	Women's 10,000 m
Silver	(Nigeria) Glory Alozie	2000 Sydney	Athletics	Women's 100 metre hurdles
Silver	(South Africa) Hestrie Cloete	2000 Sydney	Athletics	Women's high jump
Bronze	(Algeria) Djabir Saïd-Guerni	2000 Sydney	Athletics	Men's 800 metres
Bronze	(Kenya) Bernard Lagat	2000 Sydney	Athletics	Men's 1500 m
Bronze	(Morocco) Brahim Lahlafi	2000 Sydney	Athletics	Men's 5,000 metres
Bronze	(Ethiopia) Assefa Mezgebu	2000 Sydney	Athletics	Men's 10,000 m
Bronze	(South Africa) Llewellyn Herbert	2000 Sydney	Athletics	Men's 400m hurdles
Bronze	(Morocco) Ali Ezzine	2000 Sydney	Athletics	Men's 3,000 metre steeplechase
Bronze	(Ethiopia) Tesfaye Tola	2000 Sydney	Athletics	Men's marathon
Bronze	(South Africa) Frantz Kruger	2000 Sydney	Athletics	Men's discus throw
Bronze	(Algeria) Abderrahmane Hammad	2000 Sydney	Athletics	Men's high jump
Bronze	(Ethiopia) Gete Wami	2000 Sydney	Athletics	Women's 5000 m
Bronze	(Morocco) Nezha Bidouane	2000 Sydney	Athletics	Women's 400 metre hurdles
Bronze	(Kenya) Joyce Chepchumba	2000 Sydney	Athletics	Women's Marathon
Gold	(Morocco) Hicham El Guerrouj	2004 Athens	Athletics	Men's 1,500 metres
Gold	(Morocco) Hicham El Guerrouj	2004 Athens	Athletics	Men's 5,000 metres
Gold	(Ethiopia) Kenenisa Bekele	2004 Athens	Athletics	Men's 10,000 m (OR)
Gold	(Kenya) Ezekiel Kemboi	2004 Athens	Athletics	Men's 3000 m steeplechase
Gold	(Ethiopia) Meseret Defar	2004 Athens	Athletics	Women's 5000 m
Gold	(Cameroon) Françoise Mbango Etone	2004 Athens	Athletics	Women's triple jump
Silver	(South Africa) Mbulaeni Mulaudzi	2004 Athens	Athletics	Men's 800m
Silver	(Kenya) Bernard Lagat	2004 Athens	Athletics	Men's 1500 m
Silver	(Ethiopia) Kenenisa Bekele	2004 Athens	Athletics	Men's 5000 m
Silver	(Ethiopia) Sileshi Sihine	2004 Athens	Athletics	Men's 10,000 m
Silver	(Kenya) Brimin Kipruto	2004 Athens	Athletics	Men's 3000 m steeplechase
Silver	(Morocco) Hasna Benhassi	2004 Athens	Athletics	Women's 800 metres
Silver	(Kenya) Isabella Ochichi	2004 Athens	Athletics	Women's 5000 m
Silver	(Ethiopia) Ejegayehu Dibaba	2004 Athens	Athletics	Women's 10,000 m
Silver	(Kenya) Catherine Ndereba	2004 Athens	Athletics	Women's Marathon
Silver	(South Africa) Hestrie Cloete	2004 Athens	Athletics	Women's high jump
Bronze	(Kenya) Eliud Kipchoge	2004 Athens	Athletics	Men's 5000 m
Bronze	(Eritrea) Zersenay Tadese	2004 Athens	Athletics	Men's 10,000 metres
Bronze	(Kenya) Paul Kipsiele Koech	2004 Athens	Athletics	Men's 3000 m steeplechase
Bronze	(Nigeria); Olusoji Fasuba; Uchenna Emedolu; Aaron Egbele; Deji Aliu	2004 Athens	Athletics	Men's 4×100 metre relay
Bronze	(Nigeria); James Godday; Musa Audu; Saul Weigopwa; Enefiok Udo-Obong	2004 Athens	Athletics	Men's 4×400 metre relay
Bronze	(Ethiopia) Tirunesh Dibaba	2004 Athens	Athletics	Women's 5000 m
Bronze	(Ethiopia) Derartu Tulu	2004 Athens	Athletics	Women's 10,000 m
Gold	(Kenya) Wilfred Bungei	2008 Beijing	Athletics	Men's 800 m
Gold	(Kenya) Asbel Kipruto Kiprop	2008 Beijing	Athletics	Men's 1500 m
Gold	(Ethiopia) Kenenisa Bekele	2008 Beijing	Athletics	Men's 5000 m (OR)
Gold	(Ethiopia) Kenenisa Bekele	2008 Beijing	Athletics	Men's 10,000 m (OR)
Gold	(Kenya) Brimin Kiprop Kipruto	2008 Beijing	Athletics	Men's 3000 m steeplechase
Gold	(Kenya) Samuel Wanjiru	2008 Beijing	Athletics	Men's Marathon
Gold	(Kenya) Pamela Jelimo	2008 Beijing	Athletics	Women's 800 m
Gold	(Kenya) Nancy Lagat	2008 Beijing	Athletics	Women's 1500 m
Gold	(Ethiopia) Tirunesh Dibaba	2008 Beijing	Athletics	Women's 5000 m
Gold	(Ethiopia) Tirunesh Dibaba	2008 Beijing	Athletics	Women's 10,000 m (OR)
Gold	(Cameroon) Françoise Mbango Etone	2008 Beijing	Athletics	Women's triple jump
Silver	(Sudan) Ismail Ahmed Ismail	2008 Beijing	Athletics	Men's 800 metres
Silver	(Kenya) Eliud Kipchoge	2008 Beijing	Athletics	Men's 5000 m
Silver	(Ethiopia) Sileshi Sihine	2008 Beijing	Athletics	Men's 10,000 m
Silver	(Morocco) Jaouad Gharib	2008 Beijing	Athletics	Men's marathon
Silver	(South Africa) Khotso Mokoena	2008 Beijing	Athletics	Men's long jump
Silver	(Kenya) Janeth Jepkosgei Busienei	2008 Beijing	Athletics	Women's 800 m
Silver	(Ethiopia) Meseret Defar	2008 Beijing	Athletics	Women's 5000 m
Silver	(Kenya) Eunice Jepkorir	2008 Beijing	Athletics	Women's 3000 m steeplechase
Silver	(Nigeria); Franca Idoko; Gloria Kemasuode; Halimat Ismaila; Oludamola Osayomi; Agnes Osazuwa*	2008 Beijing	Athletics	Women's 4x100 metre relay
Silver	(Kenya) Catherine Ndereba	2008 Beijing	Athletics	Women's Marathon
Silver	(Nigeria) Blessing Okagbare	2008 Beijing	Athletics	Women's long jump
Bronze	(Kenya) Alfred Kirwa Yego	2008 Beijing	Athletics	Men's 800 m
Bronze	(Kenya) Edwin Cheruiyot Soi	2008 Beijing	Athletics	Men's 5000 m
Bronze	(Kenya) Micah Kogo	2008 Beijing	Athletics	Men's 10000 m
Bronze	(Kenya) Richard Kipkemboi Mateelong	2008 Beijing	Athletics	Men's 3000 m steeplechase
Bronze	(Ethiopia) Tsegay Kebede	2008 Beijing	Athletics	Men's marathon
Bronze	(Morocco) Hasna Benhassi	2008 Beijing	Athletics	Women's 800 metres
Bronze	(Kenya) Sylvia Kibet	2008 Beijing	Athletics	Women's 5000 metres
Bronze	(Kenya) Linet Masai	2008 Beijing	Athletics	Women's 10000 metres
Gold	(Kenya) David Rudisha	2012 London	Athletics	Men's 800 m
Gold	(Algeria) Taoufik Makhloufi	2012 London	Athletics	Men's 1500 metres
Gold	(Kenya) Ezekiel Kemboi	2012 London	Athletics	Men's 3000 m steeplechase
Gold	(Uganda) Stephen Kiprotich	2012 London	Athletics	Men's marathon
Gold	(South Africa) Caster Semenya	2012 London	Athletics	Women's 800m
Gold	(Ethiopia) Meseret Defar	2012 London	Athletics	Women's 5000 m
Gold	(Ethiopia) Tirunesh Dibaba	2012 London	Athletics	Women's 10,000 m
Gold	(Tunisia) Habiba Ghribi	2012 London	Athletics	Women's 3000 m steeplechase
Gold	(Ethiopia) Tiki Gelana	2012 London	Athletics	Women's marathon (OR)
Silver	(Botswana) Nijel Amos	2012 London	Athletics	Men's 800 metres
Silver	(Ethiopia) Dejen Gebremeskel	2012 London	Athletics	Men's 5000 m
Silver	(Kenya) Abel Kirui	2012 London	Athletics	Men's Marathon
Silver	(Kenya) Vivian Cheruiyot	2012 London	Athletics	Women's 5000 m
Silver	(Kenya) Sally Kipyego	2012 London	Athletics	Women's 10000 m
Silver	(Ethiopia) Sofia Assefa	2012 London	Athletics	Women's 3000 m steeplechase
Silver	(Kenya) Priscah Jeptoo	2012 London	Athletics	Women's Marathon
Bronze	(Kenya) Timothy Kitum	2012 London	Athletics	Men's 800 m
Bronze	(Morocco) Abdalaati Iguider	2012 London	Athletics	Men's 1500 metres
Bronze	(Kenya) Thomas Longosiwa	2012 London	Athletics	Men's 5000 m
Bronze	(Kenya) Abel Mutai	2012 London	Athletics	Men's 3000 m steeplechase
Bronze	(Kenya) Wilson Kipsang Kiprotich	2012 London	Athletics	Men's Marathon
Bronze	(Ethiopia) Tirunesh Dibaba	2012 London	Athletics	Women's 5000 m
Bronze	(Kenya) Vivian Cheruiyot	2012 London	Athletics	Women's 10000 m
Bronze	(Kenya) Milcah Chemos Cheywa	2012 London	Athletics	Women's 3000 m steeplechase
Gold	(South Africa) Wayde Van Niekerk	2016 Rio de Janeiro	Athletics	Men's 400 m
Gold	(Kenya) David Rudisha	2016 Rio de Janeiro	Athletics	Men's 800 m
Gold	(Kenya) Conseslus Kipruto	2016 Rio de Janeiro	Athletics	Men's 3000 m steeplechase
Gold	(Kenya) Eliud Kipchoge	2016 Rio de Janeiro	Athletics	Men's Marathon
Gold	(South Africa) Caster Semenya	2016 Rio de Janeiro	Athletics	Women's 800m
Gold	(Kenya) Faith Kipyegon	2016 Rio de Janeiro	Athletics	Women's 1500 m
Gold	(Kenya) Vivian Cheruiyot	2016 Rio de Janeiro	Athletics	Women's 5000 m
Gold	(Ethiopia) Almaz Ayana	2016 Rio de Janeiro	Athletics	Women's 10,000 m (WR)
Gold	(Kenya) Jemimah Sumgong	2016 Rio de Janeiro	Athletics	Women's Marathon
Silver	(Algeria) Taoufik Makhloufi	2016 Rio de Janeiro	Athletics	Men's 800 metres
Silver	(Algeria) Taoufik Makhloufi	2016 Rio de Janeiro	Athletics	Men's 1500 metres
Silver	(Kenya) Paul Tanui	2016 Rio de Janeiro	Athletics	Men's 10000 m
Silver	(Kenya) Boniface Mucheru Tumuti	2016 Rio de Janeiro	Athletics	Men's 400m hurdles
Silver	(Ethiopia) Feyisa Lilesa	2016 Rio de Janeiro	Athletics	Men's marathon
Silver	(South Africa) Luvo Manyonga	2016 Rio de Janeiro	Athletics	Men's long jump
Silver	(Kenya) Julius Yego	2016 Rio de Janeiro	Athletics	Men's Javelin
Silver	(Burundi) Francine Niyonsaba	2016 Rio de Janeiro	Athletics	Women's 800 metres
Silver	(Ethiopia) Genzebe Dibaba	2016 Rio de Janeiro	Athletics	Women's 1500 m
Silver	(Kenya) Hellen Obiri	2016 Rio de Janeiro	Athletics	Women's 5000 m
Silver	(Kenya) Vivian Cheruiyot	2016 Rio de Janeiro	Athletics	Women's 10000 m
Silver	(Kenya) Hyvin Jepkemoi Kiyeng	2016 Rio de Janeiro	Athletics	Women's 3000 m steeplechase
Silver	(South Africa) Sunette Viljoen	2016 Rio de Janeiro	Athletics	Women's javelin throw
Bronze	(Ethiopia) Hagos Gebrhiwet	2016 Rio de Janeiro	Athletics	Men's 5000 m
Bronze	(Ethiopia) Tamirat Tola	2016 Rio de Janeiro	Athletics	Men's 10,000 m
Bronze	(Kenya) Margaret Wambui	2016 Rio de Janeiro	Athletics	Women's 800 m
Bronze	(Ethiopia) Almaz Ayana	2016 Rio de Janeiro	Athletics	Women's 5000 m
Bronze	(Ethiopia) Tirunesh Dibaba	2016 Rio de Janeiro	Athletics	Women's 10,000 m
Bronze	(Ethiopia) Mare Dibaba	2016 Rio de Janeiro	Athletics	Women's marathon
Bronze	(Burkina Faso) Hugues Fabrice Zango	2020 Tokyo	Athletics	Men's Triple Jump

== Boxing ==
Medal	Athlete	Games	Sport	Event
Gold	(South Africa) Clarence Walker	1920 Antwerp	Boxing	Men's bantamweight
Gold	(South Africa) William Smith	1924 Paris	Boxing	Men's bantamweight
Bronze	(South Africa) Harry Isaacs	1928 Amsterdam	Boxing	Men's bantamweight
Gold	(South Africa) Lawrence Stevens	1932 Los Angeles	Boxing	Men's lightweight
Gold	(South Africa) David Carstens	1932 Los Angeles	Boxing	Men's light-heavyweight
Bronze	(South Africa) Ernest Peirce	1932 Los Angeles	Boxing	Men's middleweight
Silver	(South Africa) Charles Catterall	1936 Berlin	Boxing	Men's featherweight
Gold	(South Africa) Gerald Dreyer	1948 London	Boxing	Men's lightweight
Gold	(South Africa) George Hunter	1948 London	Boxing	Men's light-heavyweight
Silver	(South Africa) Dennis Shepherd	1948 London	Boxing	Men's featherweight
Bronze	(South Africa) John Arthur	1948 London	Boxing	Men's heavyweight
Silver	(South Africa) Theunis Van Schalkwyk	1952 Helsinki	Boxing	Men's light-middleweight
Bronze	(South Africa) William Toweel	1952 Helsinki	Boxing	Men's flyweight
Bronze	(South Africa) Leonard Leisching	1952 Helsinki	Boxing	Men's featherweight
Bronze	(South Africa) Andries Nieman	1952 Helsinki	Boxing	Men's heavyweight
Bronze	(South Africa) Daniel Bekker	1956 Melbourne/Stockholm	Boxing	Men's heavyweight
Bronze	(South Africa) Henry Loubscher	1956 Melbourne/Stockholm	Boxing	Men's light-welterweight
Silver	(Ghana) Clement Quartey	1960 Rome	Boxing	Men's light welterweight
Silver	(South Africa) Daniel Bekker	1960 Rome	Boxing	Men's heavyweight
Bronze	(Egypt) Abdel Moneim El-Guindi	1960 Rome	Boxing	Men's flyweight
Bronze	(South Africa) William Meyers	1960 Rome	Boxing	Men's featherweight
Bronze	(Tunisia) Habib Galhia	1964 Tokyo	Boxing	Men's light welterweight
Bronze	(Ghana) Eddie Blay	1964 Tokyo	Boxing	Men's light welterweight
Bronze	(Nigeria) Nojim Maiyegun	1964 Tokyo	Boxing	Men's light middleweight
Silver	(Uganda) Eridadi Mukwanga	1968 Mexico City	Boxing	Men's bantamweight
Silver	(Cameroon) Joseph Bessala	1968 Mexico City	Boxing	Men's welterweight
Bronze	(Uganda) Leo Rwabwogo	1968 Mexico City	Boxing	Men's flyweight
Bronze	(Kenya) Philip Waruinge	1968 Mexico City	Boxing	Men's featherweight
Silver	(Uganda) Leo Rwabwogo	1972 Munich	Boxing	Men's flyweight
Silver	(Kenya) Philip Waruinge	1972 Munich	Boxing	Men's featherweight
Bronze	(Kenya) Samuel Mbugua	1972 Munich	Boxing	Men's lightweight
Bronze	(Niger) Issaka Daborg	1972 Munich	Boxing	Men's light welterweight
Bronze	(Kenya) Dick Murunga	1972 Munich	Boxing	Men's welterweight
Bronze	(Ghana) Prince Amartey	1972 Munich	Boxing	Men's middleweight
Bronze	(Nigeria) Isaac Ikhouria	1972 Munich	Boxing	Men's light heavyweight
Silver	(Uganda) John Mugabi	1980 Moscow	Boxing	Men's welterweight
Silver	(Nigeria) Peter Konyegwachie	1984 Los Angeles	Boxing	Men's featherweight
Bronze	(Zambia) Keith Mwila	1984 Los Angeles	Boxing	Light flyweight (–48 kg)
Bronze	(Kenya) Ibrahim Bilali	1984 Los Angeles	Boxing	Men's flyweight
Bronze	(Cameroon) Martin Ndongo-Ebanga	1984 Los Angeles	Boxing	Men's lightweight
Bronze	(Algeria) Mohamed Zaoui	1984 Los Angeles	Boxing	Men's middleweight
Bronze	(Algeria) Mustapha Moussa	1984 Los Angeles	Boxing	Men's light-heavyweight
Gold	(Kenya) Robert Wangila	1988 Seoul	Boxing	Men's welterweight
Bronze	(Morocco) Abdelhak Achik	1988 Seoul	Boxing	Men's featherweight
Bronze	(Kenya) Chris Sande	1988 Seoul	Boxing	Men's middleweight
Silver	(Nigeria) David Izonritei	1992 Barcelona	Boxing	Men's heavyweight
Silver	(Nigeria) Richard Igbineghu	1992 Barcelona	Boxing	Men's super heavyweight
Bronze	(Morocco) Mohammed Achik	1992 Barcelona	Boxing	Men's bantamweight
Bronze	(Algeria) Hocine Soltani	1992 Barcelona	Boxing	Men's featherweight
Gold	(Algeria) Hocine Soltani	1996 Atlanta	Boxing	Men's lightweight
Bronze	(Tunisia) Fethi Missaoui	1996 Atlanta	Boxing	Men's light welterweight
Bronze	(Algeria) Mohamed Bahari	1996 Atlanta	Boxing	Men's middleweight
Bronze	(Nigeria) Duncan Dokiwari	1996 Atlanta	Boxing	Men's super heavyweight
Bronze	(Morocco) Tahar Tamsamani	2000 Sydney	Boxing	Men's featherweight
Bronze	(Algeria) Mohamed Allalou	2000 Sydney	Boxing	Men's light-welterweight
Silver	(Egypt) Mohamed Aly	2004 Athens	Boxing	Men's super heavyweight
Bronze	(Egypt) Ahmed Ismail	2004 Athens	Boxing	Men's light heavyweight
Bronze	(Egypt) Mohamed Elsayed	2004 Athens	Boxing	Men's heavyweight
Bronze	(Mauritius) Bruno Julie	2008 Beijing	Boxing	Bantamweight
Bronze	(Morocco) Mohammed Rabii	2016 Rio de Janeiro	Boxing	Men's welterweight

== Canoeing ==
Medal	Athlete	Games	Sport	Event
Bronze	(Togo) Benjamin Boukpeti	2008 Beijing	Canoeing	Men's slalom K-1
Bronze	(South Africa) Bridgitte Hartley	2012 London	Canoeing	Women's K-1 500 m

== Cycling ==
Medal	Athlete	Games	Sport	Event
Gold	(South Africa) Rudolph Lewis	1912 Stockholm	Cycling	Men's Individual Time Trial
Silver	(South Africa) Henry Kaltenbrunn	1920 Antwerp	Cycling	Men's Individual Time Trial
Silver	(South Africa); William Smith; James Walker	1920 Antwerp	Cycling	Men's Tandem
Bronze	(South Africa); James Walker; William Smith; Henry Kaltenbrunn; Harry Goosen	1920 Antwerp	Cycling	Team Pursuit
Silver	(South Africa); Raymond Robinson; Thomas Shardelow	1952 Helsinki	Cycling (Track)	Men's 2000m tandem
Silver	(South Africa); George Estman; Robert Fowler; Thomas Shardelow; Alfred Swift	1952 Helsinki	Cycling (Track)	Men's team pursuit (4000m)
Bronze	(South Africa) Raymond Robinson	1952 Helsinki	Cycling (Track)	Men's 1 km time trial
Bronze	(South Africa) Alfred Swift	1956 Melbourne/Stockholm	Cycling (Track)	Men's 1 km time trial

== Diving ==
Medal	Athlete	Games	Sport	Event
Silver	(Egypt) Farid Simaika	1928 Amsterdam	Diving	Men's 10 m platform
Bronze	(Egypt) Farid Simaika	1928 Amsterdam	Diving	Men's 3 m springboard

== Fencing ==
Medal	Athlete	Games	Sport	Event
Silver	(Egypt) Alaaeldin Abouelkassem	2012 London	Fencing	Men's foil
Bronze	(Tunisia) Inès Boubakri	2016 Rio de Janeiro	Fencing	Women's Foil

== Field hockey ==
Medal	Name	Games	Sport	Event
Gold	(Zimbabwe) Field hockey team: Arlene Boxhall Liz Chase Sandra Chick Gillian Cowley Patricia Davies Sarah English Maureen George Ann Grant Susan Huggett Patricia McKillop Brenda Phillips Christine Prinsloo Sonia Robertson Anthea Stewart Helen Volk Linda Watson	1980 Moscow	Field hockey	Women's competition

== Football ==
Medal	Athlete	Games	Sport	Event
Bronze	(Ghana) Football team: Joachin Yaw Acheampong Simon Addo Sammi Adjei Frank Amankwah Bernard Aryee Isaac Asare Kwame Ayew Ibrahim Dossey Mohammed Gargo Samuel Kumah Nii Lamptey Yaw Preko Shamo Quaye	1992 Barcelona	Football	Men's competition
Gold	(Nigeria) Men's football team: Daniel Amokachi Emmanuel Amuneke Tijani Babangida Celestine Babayaro Emmanuel Babayaro Teslim Fatusi Victor Ikpeba Dosu Joseph Nwankwo Kanu Garba Lawal Abiodun Obafemi Kingsley Obiekwu Uche Okechukwu Jay-Jay Okocha Sunday Oliseh Mobi Oparaku Wilson Oruma Taribo West	1996 Atlanta	Football	Men's competition
Gold	(Cameroon) Football team: Patrice Abanda Nicolas Alnoudji Clément Beaud Daniel Bekono Serge Branco Joël Epalle Lauren Samuel Eto'o Carlos Kameni Modeste M'bami Patrick Mboma Albert Meyong Ze Serge Mimpo Daniel Ngom Kome Aaron Nguimbat Geremi Njitap Patrick Suffo Pierre Wome	2000 Sydney	Football	Men's competition
Silver	(Nigeria) Men's football team: Olubayo Adefemi Dele Adeleye Oluwafemi Ajilore Efe Ambrose Victor Anichebe Onyekachi Apam Emmanuel Ekpo Ikechukwu Ezenwa Promise Isaac Monday James Sani Kaita Chinedu Obasi Victor Nsofor Obinna Peter Odemwingie Chibuzor Okonkwo Solomon Okoronkwo Oladapo Olufemi Ambruse Vanzekin	2008 Beijing	Football	Men's competition
Bronze	(Nigeria) Men's football team: Shehu Abdullahi Junior Ajayi Daniel Akpeyi Stanley Amuzie Emmanuel Daniel William Troost-Ekong Saturday Erimuya Oghenekaro Etebo Imoh Ezekiel Kingsley Madu John Obi Mikel Muenfuh Sincere Azubuike Okechukwu Popoola Saliu Umar Sadiq Ndifreke Udo Aminu Umar Usman Mohammed	2016 Rio de Janeiro	Football	Men's competition

== Judo ==
Medal	Athlete	Games	Sport	Event
Silver	(Egypt) Mohamed Ali Rashwan	1984 Los Angeles	Judo	Men's open
Silver	(Algeria) Amar Benikhlef	2008 Beijing	Judo	Men's -90 kg
Bronze	(Egypt) Hesham Mesbah	2008 Beijing	Judo	Men's −90 kg
Bronze	(Algeria) Soraya Haddad	2008 Beijing	Judo	Women's -52 kg

== Rowing ==
Medal	Athlete	Games	Sport	Event
Bronze	(South Africa); Donovan Cech; Ramon di Clemente	2004 Athens	Rowing	Men's coxless pair
Gold	(South Africa); Sizwe Ndlovu; Matthew Brittain; John Smith; James Thompson	2012 London	Rowing	Men's Lightweight Four
Silver	(South Africa); Shaun Keeling; Lawrence Brittain	2016 Rio de Janeiro	Rowing	Men's coxless pair

== Rugby 7s ==
Medal	Athlete	Games	Sport	Event
Bronze	(South Africa) Rugby sevens team: Cheslin Kolbe Juan de Jongh Seabelo Senatla Justin Geduld Kyle Brown Cecil Afrika Kwagga Smith Werner Kok Rosko Specman Philip Snyman Dylan Sage Francois Hougaard Tim Agaba	2016 Rio de Janeiro	Rugby Sevens	Men's tournament

== Shooting ==
Medal	Athlete	Games	Sport	Event
Silver	(South Africa); David Smith; Robert Bodley; Ferdinand Buchanan; Frederick Morgan	1920 Antwerp	Shooting	Men's Team 600 Metres Military Rifle

== Swimming ==
Medal	Athlete	Games	Sport	Event
Bronze	(South Africa); Rhoda Rennie; Frederica van der Goes; Mary Bedford; Kathleen Russell	1928 Amsterdam	Swimming	Women's 4 × 100 m freestyle relay
Bronze	(South Africa) Jenny Maakal	1932 Los Angeles	Swimming	Women's 400 m freestyle
Gold	(South Africa) Joan Harrison	1952 Helsinki	Swimming	Women's 100 m backstroke
Bronze	(South Africa); Moira Abernethy; Jeanette Myburgh; Natalie Myburgh; Susan Elizabeth Roberts	1956 Melbourne/Stockholm	Swimming	Women's 4 × 100 m freestyle relay
Gold	(South Africa) Penelope Heyns	1996 Atlanta	Swimming	Women's 100m breaststroke
Gold	(South Africa) Penelope Heyns	1996 Atlanta	Swimming	Women's 200m breaststroke
Bronze	(South Africa) Marianne Kriel	1996 Atlanta	Swimming	Women's 100m backstroke
Silver	(South Africa) Terence Parkin	2000 Sydney	Swimming	Men's 200m breaststroke
Bronze	(South Africa) Penelope Heyns	2000 Sydney	Swimming	Women's 100m breaststroke
Gold	(South Africa); Lyndon Ferns; Ryk Neethling; Roland Mark Schoeman; Darian Townsend	2004 Athens	Swimming	Men's 4 × 100 m freestyle relay
Gold	(Zimbabwe) Kirsty Coventry	2004 Athens	Swimming	Women's 200-metre backstroke
Silver	(South Africa) Roland Mark Schoeman	2004 Athens	Swimming	Men's 100m freestyle
Silver	(Zimbabwe) Kirsty Coventry	2004 Athens	Swimming	Women's 100-metre backstroke
Bronze	(South Africa) Roland Mark Schoeman	2004 Athens	Swimming	Men's 50m freestyle
Bronze	(Zimbabwe) Kirsty Coventry	2004 Athens	Swimming	Women's 200-metre individual medley
Gold	(Tunisia) Oussama Mellouli	2008 Beijing	Swimming	Men's 1500 m freestyle
Gold	(Zimbabwe) Kirsty Coventry	2008 Beijing	Swimming	Women's 200-metre backstroke
Silver	(Zimbabwe) Kirsty Coventry	2008 Beijing	Swimming	Women's 100-metre backstroke
Silver	(Zimbabwe) Kirsty Coventry	2008 Beijing	Swimming	Women's 200-metre individual medley
Silver	(Zimbabwe) Kirsty Coventry	2008 Beijing	Swimming	Women's 400-metre individual medley
Gold	(South Africa) Cameron van der Burgh	2012 London	Swimming	Men's 100m breaststroke
Gold	(South Africa) Chad le Clos	2012 London	Swimming	Men's 200m butterfly
Gold	(Tunisia) Oussama Mellouli	2012 London	Swimming	Men's 10km marathon
Silver	(South Africa) Chad le Clos	2012 London	Swimming	Men's 100m butterfly
Bronze	(Tunisia) Oussama Mellouli	2012 London	Swimming	Men's 1500 m freestyle
Silver	(South Africa) Chad le Clos	2016 Rio de Janeiro	Swimming	Men's 200m freestyle
Silver	(South Africa) Chad le Clos	2016 Rio de Janeiro	Swimming	Men's 100m butterfly
Silver	(South Africa) Cameron van der Burgh	2016 Rio de Janeiro	Swimming	Men's 100m breaststroke
Gold	(Tunisia) Ahmed Hafnaoui	2020 Tokyo	Swimming	Men's 400m freestyle
Gold	(South Africa) Tatjana Schoenmaker	2020 Tokyo	Swimming	Women's 200m breaststroke
Silver	(South Africa) Tatjana Schoenmaker	2020 Tokyo	Swimming	Women's 100m breaststroke

== Taekwondo ==
Medal	Athlete	Games	Sport	Event
Bronze	(Egypt) Tamer Bayoumi	2004 Athens	Taekwondo	Men's 58 kg
Bronze	(Nigeria) Chika Chukwumerije	2008 Beijing	Taekwondo	Men's +80 kg
Silver	(Gabon) Anthony Obame	2012 London	Taekwondo	Men's +80 kg
Gold	(Ivory Coast) Cheick Sallah Cisse	2016 Rio de Janeiro	Taekwondo	Men's 80 kg
Silver	(Niger) Abdoul Razak Issoufou	2016 Rio de Janeiro	Taekwondo	Men's +80kg
Bronze	(Tunisia) Oussama Oueslati	2016 Rio de Janeiro	Taekwondo	Men's 80 kg
Bronze	(Egypt) Hedaya Malak	2016 Rio de Janeiro	Taekwondo	Women's 57 kg
Bronze	(Ivory Coast) Ruth Gbagbi	2016 Rio de Janeiro	Taekwondo	Women's 67 kg

== Tennis ==
Medal	Athlete	Games	Sport	Event
Gold	(South Africa) Charles Winslow	1912 Stockholm	Tennis	Men's Singles Outdoor
Gold	(South Africa); Harold Kitson; Charles Winslow	1912 Stockholm	Tennis	Men's Doubles Outdoor
Silver	(South Africa) Harold Kitson	1912 Stockholm	Tennis	Men's Singles Outdoor
Gold	(South Africa) Louis Raymond	1920 Antwerp	Tennis	Men's Singles
Bronze	(South Africa) Charles Winslow	1920 Antwerp	Tennis	Men's Singles
Silver	(South Africa); Wayne Ferreira; Piet Norval	1992 Barcelona	Tennis	Men's Doubles

== Triathlon ==
Medal	Athlete	Games	Sport	Event
Bronze	(South Africa) Henri Schoeman	2016 Rio de Janeiro	Triathlon	Men's Triathlon

== Weightlifting ==
Medal	Athlete	Games	Sport	Event
Gold	(Egypt) El Sayed Nosseir	1928 Amsterdam	Weightlifting	Men's light heavyweight
Gold	(Egypt) Anwar Mesbah	1936 Berlin	Weightlifting	Men's lightweight
Gold	(Egypt) Khadr El Touni	1936 Berlin	Weightlifting	Men's middleweight
Silver	(Egypt) Saleh Soliman	1936 Berlin	Weightlifting	Men's featherweight
Bronze	(Egypt) Ibrahim Shams	1936 Berlin	Weightlifting	Men's featherweight
Bronze	(Egypt) Ibrahim Wasif	1936 Berlin	Weightlifting	Men's light heavyweight
Gold	(Egypt) Mahmoud Fayad	1948 London	Weightlifting	Men's featherweight
Gold	(Egypt) Ibrahim Shams	1948 London	Weightlifting	Men's lightweight
Silver	(Egypt) Attia Hamouda	1948 London	Weightlifting	Men's lightweight
Silver	(Nigeria) Ruth Ogbeifo	2000 Sydney	Weightlifting	Women's 75 kg
Bronze	(Egypt) Abeer Abdelrahman	2008 Beijing	Weightlifting	Women's 69 kg
Bronze	(Nigeria) Mariam Usman	2008 Beijing	Weightlifting	Women's +75 kg
Silver	(Egypt) Abeer Abdelrahman	2012 London	Weightlifting	Women's 75 kg
Bronze	(Egypt) Tarek Yehia	2012 London	Weightlifting	Men's 85 kg
Bronze	(Cameroon) Madias Nzesso	2012 London	Weightlifting	Women's 75 kg
Bronze	(Egypt) Mohamed Ihab	2016 Rio de Janeiro	Weightlifting	Men's 77 kg
Bronze	(Egypt) Sara Ahmed	2016 Rio de Janeiro	Weightlifting	Women's 69 kg

== Wrestling ==
Medal	Athlete	Games	Sport	Event
Gold	(Egypt) Ibrahim Moustafa	1928 Amsterdam	Wrestling	Men's Greco-Roman light heavyweight
Silver	(Egypt) Mahmoud Hassan	1948 London	Wrestling	Men's Greco-Roman bantamweight
Bronze	(Egypt) Ibrahim Orabi	1948 London	Wrestling	Men's Greco-Roman light heavyweight
Bronze	(Egypt) Abdel Aaal Rashed	1952 Helsinki	Wrestling	Men's Greco-Roman featherweight
Silver	(Egypt) Osman Sayed	1960 Rome	Wrestling	Men's Greco-Roman flyweight
Gold	(Egypt) Karam Gaber	2004 Athens	Wrestling	Men's Greco-Roman 96 kg
Silver	(Egypt) Karam Gaber	2012 London	Wrestling	Men's Greco-Roman 84 kg
Bronze	(Tunisia) Marwa Amri	2016 Rio de Janeiro	Wrestling	Women's freestyle 58 kg

== See also ==
- Lists of Olympic medalists
- All-time Olympic Games medal table
- All-time Paralympic Games medal table
- All-time Universiade medal table
- All-time Youth Olympic Games medal table
- Sport in Africa
- Paralympic sports
- Paralympic Games
