= Cameroon at the Olympics =

- IOC code: CMR
- NOC: Cameroon Olympic and Sports Committee
- Website: www.cnosc.org (in French)
- Medals Ranked 87th: Gold 3 Silver 1 Bronze 2 Total 6

Summer appearances
- 1964; 1968; 1972; 1976; 1980; 1984; 1988; 1992; 1996; 2000; 2004; 2008; 2012; 2016; 2020; 2024; 2028

Winter appearances
- 2002; 2006–2026

Cameroon first participated at the Olympic Games in 1964, and has sent athletes to compete in every Summer Olympic Games since then. The nation withdrew from the 1976 Summer Olympics after three days of competition, to join the broad African boycott in response to the participation of South Africa, which still had sporting links with apartheid South Africa. Cameroon also participated in the Winter Olympic Games on one occasion, in 2002, with a single representative, Isaac Menyoli.

Cameroonian athletes have won six medals, including the gold medal in football at the 2000 Summer Olympics.

The Cameroon Olympic and Sports Committee was created and recognized by the IOC in 1963.

== Medal tables ==
=== Medals by Summer Games ===
Games	Athletes	Gold	Silver	Bronze	Total	Rank
(Japan) 1964 Tokyo	1	0	0	0	0	–
1968 Mexico City	5	0	1	0	1	39
(West Germany) 1972 Munich	11	0	0	0	0	–
(Canada) 1976 Montreal	8	0	0	0	0	–
(Soviet Union) 1980 Moscow	25	0	0	0	0	–
(United States) 1984 Los Angeles	48	0	0	1	1	43
(South Korea) 1988 Seoul	15	0	0	0	0	–
(Spain) 1992 Barcelona	8	0	0	0	0	–
(United States) 1996 Atlanta	15	0	0	0	0	–
(Australia) 2000 Sydney	35	1	0	0	1	50
(Greece) 2004 Athens	17	1	0	0	1	54
(China) 2008 Beijing	33	1	0	0	1	52
(United Kingdom) 2012 London	33	0	0	1	1	79
(Brazil) 2016 Rio de Janeiro	24	0	0	0	0	–
(Japan) 2020 Tokyo	12	0	0	0	0	–
(France) 2024 Paris	6	0	0	0	0	–
(United States) 2028 Los Angeles	future event					
(Australia) 2032 Brisbane	future event					
Total		3	1	2	6	87

=== Medals by Winter Games ===
Games	Athletes	Gold	Silver	Bronze	Total	Rank
(United States) 2002 Salt Lake City	1	0	0	0	0	–
2006–2026	did not participate					
(France) 2030 French Alps	future event					
(United States) 2034 Utah	future event					
Total		0	0	0	0	–

=== Medals by summer sport ===
Sport	Gold	Silver	Bronze	Total
Athletics	2	0	0	2
Football	1	0	0	1
Boxing	0	1	1	2
Weightlifting	0	0	1	1
Totals (4 entries)	3	1	2	6

== List of medalists ==
Medal	Name	Games	Sport	Event	Ref.
Silver	Joseph Bessala	1968 Mexico City	Boxing	Men's welterweight	
Bronze	Martin Ndongo-Ebanga	1984 Los Angeles	Boxing	Men's lightweight	
Gold	Football team: Patrice Abanda Nicolas Alnoudji Clément Beaud Daniel Bekono Serge Branco Joël Epalle Lauren Samuel Eto'o Carlos Kameni Modeste M'bami Patrick Mboma Albert Meyong Ze Serge Mimpo Daniel Ngom Kome Aaron Nguimbat Geremi Njitap Patrick Suffo Pierre Wome	2000 Sydney	Football	Men's competition	
Gold	Françoise Mbango Etone	2004 Athens	Athletics	Women's triple jump	
Gold	Françoise Mbango Etone	2008 Beijing	Athletics	Women's triple jump	
Bronze	Madias Nzesso	2012 London	Weightlifting	Women's 75 kg	

== See also ==
- List of flag bearers for Cameroon at the Olympics
- Category:Olympic competitors for Cameroon
- Tropical nations at the Winter Olympics
