= Cameroon at the 1984 Summer Olympics =

- IOC code: CMR
- NOC: Cameroon Olympic and Sports Committee

in Los Angeles
- Competitors: 46 (42 men, 2 women) in 6 sports
- Flag bearer: Issa Hayatou
- Medals Ranked 43rd: Gold 0 Silver 0 Bronze 1 Total 1

Summer Olympics appearances (overview)
- 1964; 1968; 1972; 1976; 1980; 1984; 1988; 1992; 1996; 2000; 2004; 2008; 2012; 2016; 2020; 2024

Cameroon competed at the 1984 Summer Olympics in Los Angeles, United States. 46 competitors, 42 men and 2 women, took part in 32 events in 6 sports.

== Medalists ==
Medal	Name	Sport	Event	Date
Bronze	Martin Ndongo Ebanga	Boxing	Men's lightweight	9 August

== Athletics ==
Men's 400 metres

- Mama Moluh
  - Heat — 48.90 (→ did not advance)

Men's Long Jump

- Ernest Tché-Noubossie (Note: otherwise Ernest Tché Noubossie; also competed at the 1988 Summer Olympics)
  - Qualification — 6.76m (→ did not advance, 29th place)

Women's 100 metres

- Cécile Ngambi
  - First Heat — 11.67s
  - Second Heat — 11.82s
  - Semi Final — 11.91s (→ did not advance)
- Ruth Enang Mesode
  - First Heat — 11.81s
  - Second Heat — 12.02s (→ did not advance)

Women's Discus Throw

- Agathe Ngo Nack
  - Qualification — 38.32m (→ did not advance)

Women's Javelin Throw

- Agnes Tchuinte
  - Qualification — 55.94m (→ did not advance)

== Boxing ==
Lightweight, Men

- Martin N'Dongo Ebanga Bronze

Light welterweight, Men

- Jean-Pierre Mbereke-Baban (=5th)

Welterweight, Men

- Georges-Claude Ngangue (=17th)

Light middleweight, Men

- Pierre Claver Mella (=17th)

Middleweight, Men

- Paul Kamela (=17th)

Light heavyweight, Men

- Jean-Paul Nanga-Ntsah (=5th)

== Cycling ==
Five cyclists represented Cameroon in 1984.

Individual road race

- Alain Ayissi — did not finish (→ no ranking)
- Joseph Kono — did not finish (→ no ranking)
- Dieudonné Ntep — did not finish (→ no ranking)
- Thomas Siani — did not finish (→ no ranking)

Team time trial

- Alain Ayissi
- Lucas Feutsa
- Joseph Kono
- Dieudonné Ntep

== Football ==
Men's Team Competition

- Preliminary Round (Group B)
  - Cameroon — Yugoslavia 1-2
  - Cameroon — Iraq 1-0
  - Cameroon — Canada 1-3
- Quarterfinals
  - Did not advance
- Team Roster
  - ( 1.) Joseph-Antoine Bell (gk)
  - ( 2.) Luc Mbassi
  - ( 3.) Isaac Sinkot
  - ( 4.) Michel Bilamo
  - ( 5.) Elie Onana
  - ( 6.) Emmanuel Kundé
  - ( 7.) Louis M'fede
  - ( 8.) Eugene Ekeke
  - ( 9.) Roger Milla
  - (10.) Dagobert Dang
  - (11.) Charles Toubé
  - (12.) Ernest Ebongue
  - (13.) Paul Bahoken
  - (14.) Theophile Abega
  - (15.) François Doumbé Lea
  - (16.) Ibrahim Aoudou
  - (17.) Jacques Songo'o (gk)
- Head Coach: Kae Rade
