= Cameroon at the 2024 Summer Olympics =

- IOC code: CMR
- NOC: Cameroon Olympic and Sports Committee
- Website: www.cnosc.org (in French)

in Paris, France 26 July 2024 – 11 August 2024
- Competitors: 6 (2 men and 4 women) in 4 sports
- Flag bearers: Emmanuel Eseme & Richelle Soppi Mbella
- Medals: Gold 0 Silver 0 Bronze 0 Total 0

Summer Olympics appearances (overview)
- 1964; 1968; 1972; 1976; 1980; 1984; 1988; 1992; 1996; 2000; 2004; 2008; 2012; 2016; 2020; 2024

Cameroon competed at the 2024 Summer Olympics in Paris from 26 July to 11 August 2024. It was the nation's sixteenth consecutive appearance at the Summer Olympics. Cameroon did not win any medals.

== Competitors ==
The following is the list of number of competitors in the Games.

Sport	Men	Women	Total
Athletics	1	1	2
Judo	0	1	1
Swimming	1	1	2
Table tennis	0	1	1
Total	2	4	6

== Athletics ==
Cameroonian track and field athletes achieved the entry standards for Paris 2024, either by passing the direct qualifying mark (or time for track and road races) or by world ranking, in the following events (a maximum of 3 athletes each):

Key

- Note–Ranks given for track events are within the athlete's heat only
- Q = Qualified for the next round
- q = Qualified for the next round as a fastest loser or, in field events, by position without achieving the qualifying target
- NR = National record
- N/A = Round not applicable for the event
- Bye = Athlete not required to compete in round

Track & road events

Athlete	Event	Preliminary		Heat		Repechage		Semifinal		Final	
Athlete	Event	Time	Rank	Time	Rank	Time	Rank	Time	Rank	Time	Rank
Emmanuel Eseme	Men's 100 m	Bye		9.98 SB	2 Q	—N/a		10.00	4	Did not advance	
Linda Angounou	Women's 400 m hurdles	—N/a		55.69 NR	8	55.09 NR	8	Did not advance			

== Judo ==
Cameroon qualified one judoka for the following weight class at the Games. Richelle Soppi Mbella (women's super-heavyweight, +78 kg) got qualified via continental quota based on Olympic point rankings.

Athlete	Event	Round of 32	Round of 16	Quarterfinals	Semifinals	Repechage	Final / BM	
Athlete	Event	Opposition Result	Opposition Result	Opposition Result	Opposition Result	Opposition Result	Opposition Result	Rank
Richelle Soppi Mbella	Women's +78 kg	Sone (JPN); L 00–10	Did not advance					

== Swimming ==
Cameroon sent two swimmers to compete at the 2024 Paris Olympics.

Athlete	Event	Heat		Semifinal		Final	
Athlete	Event	Time	Rank	Time	Rank	Time	Rank
Giorgio Armani Nguichie Kamseu Kamogne	Men's 100 m freestyle	1:03.42	78	Did not advance			
Grace Manuela Nguelo'O	Women's 50 m freestyle	30.98	66	Did not advance			

Qualifiers for the latter rounds (Q) of all events were decided on a time only basis, therefore positions shown are overall results versus competitors in all heats.

== Table tennis ==
Cameroon entered one table tennis player into Paris 2024. Sarah Hanffou qualified for the games following the triumph of winning the second available quota places at the 2024 African Qualification Tournament in Kigali, Rwanda.

Athlete	Event	Preliminary	Round of 64	Round of 32	Round of 16	Quarterfinals	Semifinals	Final / BM	
Athlete	Event	Opposition Result	Opposition Result	Opposition Result	Opposition Result	Opposition Result	Opposition Result	Opposition Result	Rank
Sarah Hanffou	Women's singles	Edghill (GUY); W 4–1	Cheng I-c (TPE); L 0–4	Did not advance					
