= Cameroon at the 2008 Summer Olympics =

- IOC code: CMR
- NOC: Cameroon Olympic and Sports Committee
- Website: www.cnosc.org (in French)

in Beijing
- Competitors: 33 in 9 sports
- Flag bearer: Franck Moussima
- Medals Ranked 52nd: Gold 1 Silver 0 Bronze 0 Total 1

Summer Olympics appearances (overview)
- 1964; 1968; 1972; 1976; 1980; 1984; 1988; 1992; 1996; 2000; 2004; 2008; 2012; 2016; 2020; 2024

Cameroon competed in the 2008 Summer Olympics held in Beijing, People's Republic of China from August 8 to August 24, 2008.

== Medalists ==
Medal	Name	Sport	Event	Date
Gold	Françoise Mbango Etone	Athletics	Women's triple jump	August 17

== Athletics ==
Key

- Note–Ranks given for track events are within the athlete's heat only
- Q = Qualified for the next round
- q = Qualified for the next round as a fastest loser or, in field events, by position without achieving the qualifying target
- NR = National record
- N/A = Round not applicable for the event
- Bye = Athlete not required to compete in round

Men
Field events

Athlete	Event	Qualification		Final	
Athlete	Event	Distance	Position	Distance	Position
Hugo Mamba-Schlick	Triple jump	16.01	15	Did not advance	

Women
Track & road events

Athlete	Event	Heat		Quarterfinal		Semifinal		Final	
Athlete	Event	Result	Rank	Result	Rank	Result	Rank	Result	Rank
Myriam Léonie Mani	100 m	10.50	3 Q	10.08	6	Did not advance			
Carole Kaboud Mebam	400 m hurdles	57.81	6	—		Did not advance			

Field events

Athlete	Event	Qualification		Final	
Athlete	Event	Distance	Position	Distance	Position
Françoise Mbango Etone	Triple jump	14.50	6 Q	15.39	1st place, gold medalist(s)
Georgina Toth	Hammer throw	NM	—	Did not advance	

== Boxing ==
Cameroon qualified three boxers for the Olympic boxing tournament. Mulema qualified in the welterweight class at the 1st AIBA African Olympic Boxing Qualifying Tournament. Essomba and Mahaman both qualified at the second continental tournament.

Athlete	Event	Round of 32	Round of 16	Quarterfinals	Semifinals	Final	
Athlete	Event	Opposition Result	Opposition Result	Opposition Result	Opposition Result	Opposition Result	Rank
Thomas Essomba	Light flyweight	Danielyan (ARM); L 3–9	Did not advance				
Mahaman Smaila	Light welterweight	Iglesias (CUB); L 1–15	Did not advance				
Joseph Mulema	Welterweight	Bongongo (CAF); W 17–2	Hanati (CHN); L 4–9	Did not advance			

== Football ==
=== Men's tournament ===
Roster

The following is the Cameroon squad in the men's football tournament of the 2008 Summer Olympics.

Head coach: Martin Ndtoungou

No.	Pos.	Player	Date of birth (age)	Caps	Goals	Club
1	GK	Amour Patrick Tignyemb (c)	14 June 1985 (aged 23)	0	0	(Cameroon) Tonnerre Yaoundé
2	MF	Albert Baning	9 March 1985 (aged 23)	0	0	(France) Paris Saint-Germain
3	DF	Antonio Ghomsi*	22 April 1984 (aged 24)	0	0	(Italy) Messina
4	DF	André Bikey	8 January 1985 (aged 23)	0	0	(England) Reading
5	DF	Alexandre Song	9 September 1987 (aged 20)	0	0	(England) Arsenal
6	DF	Stéphane Mbia	20 May 1986 (aged 22)	0	0	(France) Stade Rennes
7	FW	Marc Mboua	26 February 1987 (aged 21)	0	0	(Netherlands) Cambuur
8	MF	Georges Mandjeck	9 December 1988 (aged 19)	0	0	(Germany) VfB Stuttgart
9	MF	Franck Songo'o	14 May 1987 (aged 21)	0	0	(England) Portsmouth
10	FW	Christian Bekamenga	9 May 1986 (aged 22)	0	0	(France) Nantes
11	FW	Gustave Bebbe*	22 June 1982 (aged 26)	0	0	(Turkey) Ankaragücü
12	DF	Paul Rolland Bebey Kingué	9 November 1986 (aged 21)	0	0	(Cameroon) Les Astres
13	DF	Nicolas N'Koulou	27 March 1990 (aged 18)	0	0	(France) Monaco
14	MF	Aurélien Chedjou	20 June 1985 (aged 23)	0	0	(France) Lille
15	MF	Serge N'Gal	13 January 1986 (aged 22)	0	0	(Portugal) União de Leiria
16	GK	Joslain Mayebi	14 October 1986 (aged 21)	0	0	(Israel) Hakoah Ramat Gan
17	MF	Alain Junior Ollé Ollé	11 April 1987 (aged 21)	0	0	(Germany) SC Freiburg
18	DF	Alexis Enam	25 November 1986 (aged 21)	0	0	(Tunisia) Club Africain
22	DF	Adiaba Bondoa (Note: Replaces Alexis Enam who was injured during the competition)	2 January 1987 (aged 21)	0	0	(Slovakia) Dunajská Streda

* Over-aged player.

Notes

Group play

Pos	Team	Pld	W	D	L	GF	GA	GD	Pts	Qualification
1	Italy	3	2	1	0	6	0	+6	7	Qualified for the quarterfinals
2	Cameroon	3	1	2	0	2	1	+1	5	Qualified for the quarterfinals
3	South Korea	3	1	1	1	2	4	−2	4	
4	Honduras	3	0	0	3	0	5	−5	0	

7 August 2008
19:45

South Korea	1–1	Cameroon
Park Chu-young 68'	Report	Mandjeck 81'

Qinhuangdao Olympic Sports Center Stadium, Qinhuangdao
Attendance: 21,943
Referee: Jair Marrufo (United States)
10 August 2008
17:00

Cameroon	1–0	Honduras
Mbia 74'	Report

Qinhuangdao Olympic Sports Center Stadium, Qinhuangdao
Attendance: 28,657
Referee: Abdullah Al Hilali (Oman)
13 August 2008
17:00

Cameroon	0–0	Italy
	Report

Tianjin Olympic Center Stadium, Tianjin
Attendance: 47,307
Referee: Martín Vázquez (Uruguay)

Quarterfinals

16 August 2008
18:00

Brazil	2–0 (a.e.t.)	Cameroon
Sóbis 101'; Marcelo 105'	Report

Shenyang Olympic Stadium, Shenyang
Attendance: 41,043
Referee: Damir Skomina (Slovenia)

== Judo ==
Athlete	Event	Round of 32	Round of 16	Quarterfinals	Semifinals	Repechage 1	Repechage 2	Repechage 3	Final / BM	
Athlete	Event	Opposition Result	Opposition Result	Opposition Result	Opposition Result	Opposition Result	Opposition Result	Opposition Result	Opposition Result	Rank
Franck Moussima	Men's −100 kg	Martínez (MEX); W 0100–0001	Hadfi (HUN); L 0010–1002	Did not advance						

== Rowing ==
Men

Athlete	Event	Heats		Quarterfinals		Semifinals		Final	
Athlete	Event	Time	Rank	Time	Rank	Time	Rank	Time	Rank
Paul Etia Ndoumbe	Single sculls	7:59.26	5 SE/F	Bye		7:29.68	2 FE	7:21.34	28

== Swimming ==
Men

Athlete	Event	Heat		Semifinal		Final	
Athlete	Event	Time	Rank	Time	Rank	Time	Rank
Alain Brigion Tobe	50 m freestyle	24.53	61	Did not advance			

Women

Athlete	Event	Heat		Semifinal		Final	
Athlete	Event	Time	Rank	Time	Rank	Time	Rank
Antoinette Guedia Mouafo	50 m freestyle	33.59	83	Did not advance			

== Table tennis ==
Athlete	Event	Preliminary round	Round 1	Round 2	Round 3	Round 4	Quarterfinals	Semifinals	Final / BM	
Athlete	Event	Opposition Result	Opposition Result	Opposition Result	Opposition Result	Opposition Result	Opposition Result	Opposition Result	Opposition Result	Rank
Victorine Agum Fomum	Women's singles	Lian Q (DOM); L 0–4	Did not advance							

== Weightlifting ==
Athlete	Event	Snatch		Clean & Jerk		Total	Rank
Athlete	Event	Result	Rank	Result	Rank	Total	Rank
Brice Vivien Batchaya	Men's −85 kg	153	13	180	14	333	14

== Wrestling ==
Key:

- VT - Victory by Fall.
- PP - Decision by Points - the loser with technical points.
- PO - Decision by Points - the loser without technical points.

Women's freestyle

Athlete	Event	Round of 16	Quarterfinal	Semifinal	Repechage 1	Repechage 2	Final / BM	
Athlete	Event	Opposition Result	Opposition Result	Opposition Result	Opposition Result	Opposition Result	Opposition Result	Rank
Annabelle Ali	−72 kg	Wieszczek (POL); L 0–3 ^{PO}	Did not advance					16
