= Cameroon at the 1996 Summer Olympics =

- IOC code: CMR
- NOC: Cameroon Olympic and Sports Committee
- Website: www.cnosc.org (in French)

in Atlanta
- Competitors: 15 (11 men and 4 women) in 5 sports
- Flag bearer: Georgette N'Koma
- Medals: Gold 0 Silver 0 Bronze 0 Total 0

Summer Olympics appearances (overview)
- 1964; 1968; 1972; 1976; 1980; 1984; 1988; 1992; 1996; 2000; 2004; 2008; 2012; 2016; 2020; 2024

Cameroon competed at the 1996 Summer Olympics in Atlanta, United States.

== Competitors ==
The following is the list of number of competitors in the Games.

| Sport | Men | Women | Total |
|---|---|---|---|
| Athletics | 4 | 4 | 8 |
| Boxing | 4 | – | 4 |
| Judo | 1 | 0 | 1 |
| Weightlifting | 1 | – | 1 |
| Wrestling | 1 | – | 1 |
| Total | 11 | 4 | 15 |

== Results by Event ==
=== Athletics ===
==== Men ====
Track and road events

| Athletes | Events | Heat Round 1 | | Heat Round 2 | | Semifinal | | Final | |
| Athletes | Events | Time | Rank | Time | Rank | Time | Rank | Time | Rank |
|---|---|---|---|---|---|---|---|---|---|
| Benjamin Sirimou | 100 metres | 10.58 | 59 | did not advance | | | | | |
| Benjamin Sirimou | 200 metres | 21.00 | 52 | did not advance | | | | | |
| Alfred Moussambani; Benjamin Sirimou; Aimé-Issa Nthépé; Claude Toukéné-Guébogo | 4 x 100 metres relay | 39.81 | 20 | N/A | | did not advance | | | |

==== Women ====
Track and road events

| Athletes | Events | Heat Round 1 | | Heat Round 2 | | Semifinal | | Final | |
| Athletes | Events | Time | Rank | Time | Rank | Time | Rank | Time | Rank |
|---|---|---|---|---|---|---|---|---|---|
| Myriam Mani | 100 metres | 11.76 | 42 | did not advance | | | | | |
| Georgette N'Koma | 200 metres | 23.68 | 37 | did not advance | | | | | |
| Myriam Mani; Georgette N'Koma; Edwige Abéna Fouda; Sylvie Mballa Eloundou | 4 x 100 metres relay | did not finish | | N/A | | | | did not advance | |

=== Boxing ===
| Athlete | Event | Round of 32 | Round of 16 | Quarterfinal | Semifinal | Final |
| Athlete | Event | Opposition Result | Opposition Result | Opposition Result | Opposition Result | Opposition Result |
|---|---|---|---|---|---|---|
| Elvis Konamegui | Featherweight | Gevorgyan (ARM); L 10-3 | Did not advance | | | |
| Ernest Atangana Mboa | Welterweight | Santos (PUR); L (RSC-1) | Did not advance | | | |
| Bertrand Tietsia | Middleweight | Mun (KOR); W 12-2 | Magee (IRL); L 11-6 | Did not advance | | |
| Paul Mbongo | Light-Heavyweight | Odhiambo (KEN); W 15-6 | Amos-Ross (CAN); L 7-3 | Did not advance | | |

=== Judo ===
Men

| Athlete | Event | Result |
|---|---|---|
| Serge Biwole Abolo | Middleweight | 13 |

=== Weightlifting ===
| Athletes | Events | Snatch | | Clean & Jerk | | Total | Rank |
| Athletes | Events | Result | Rank | Result | Rank | Total | Rank |
|---|---|---|---|---|---|---|---|
| Samson N'Dicka-Matam | -64 kg | 125 | =19 | 155 | =22 | 280 | 25 |

=== Wrestling ===
Freestyle

| Athlete | Event | Round 1 | Round 2 | Quarterfinal | Semifinal | Final | Repechage Round 1 | Repechage Round 2 | Repechage Round 3 | Repechage Round 4 | Repechage Round 5 | Bronze Medal Bout |
| Athlete | Event | Opposition Result | Opposition Result | Opposition Result | Opposition Result | Opposition Result | Opposition Result | Opposition Result | Opposition Result | Opposition Result | Opposition Result | Opposition Result |
|---|---|---|---|---|---|---|---|---|---|---|---|---|
| Anthony Avom Mbume | -74 kg | Paskalev (BUL); L 10-0 | did not advance | | | | bye | Hohl (CAN); L 10-0 | did not advance | | | |
