= Abanda =

Abanda is a Cameroonian surname and given name. People with this name include:

- Patrice Abanda (born 1978), Cameroonian footballer
- Abanda Herman (born 1979), Cameroonian footballer
- Francoise Abanda (born 1997), Canadian tennis player.
