= Cameroon at the 1964 Summer Olympics =

- IOC code: CMR
- NOC: Cameroon Olympic and Sports Committee

in Tokyo
- Competitors: 1 in 1 sport
- Medals: Gold 0 Silver 0 Bronze 0 Total 0

Summer Olympics appearances (overview)
- 1964; 1968; 1972; 1976; 1980; 1984; 1988; 1992; 1996; 2000; 2004; 2008; 2012; 2016; 2020; 2024

Cameroon competed in the Summer Olympic Games for the first time at the 1964 Summer Olympics in Tokyo, Japan. David Njitock was the lone representative for Cameroon, placing 7th and 5th in the heats of the 100 metres and the 200 metres runs, not advancing to the finals.
