= Cameroon at the 2004 Summer Olympics =

- IOC code: CMR
- NOC: Cameroon Olympic and Sports Committee
- Website: www.cnosc.org (in French)

in Athens
- Competitors: 17 in 5 sports
- Flag bearer: Vencelas Dabaya
- Medals Ranked 54th: Gold 1 Silver 0 Bronze 0 Total 1

Summer Olympics appearances (overview)
- 1964; 1968; 1972; 1976; 1980; 1984; 1988; 1992; 1996; 2000; 2004; 2008; 2012; 2016; 2020; 2024

Cameroon competed at the 2004 Summer Olympics in Athens, Greece, from 13 to 29 August 2004.

== Medalists ==
Medal	Name	Sport	Event	Date
Gold	Françoise Mbango Etone	Athletics	Women's triple jump	August 23

== Athletics ==
Cameroonian athletes have so far achieved qualifying standards in the following athletics events (up to a maximum of 3 athletes in each event at the 'A' Standard, and 1 at the 'B' Standard).

Key

- Note–Ranks given for track events are within the athlete's heat only
- Q = Qualified for the next round
- q = Qualified for the next round as a fastest loser or, in field events, by position without achieving the qualifying target
- NR = National record
- N/A = Round not applicable for the event
- Bye = Athlete not required to compete in round

Men
Track & road events

Athlete	Event	Heat		Quarterfinal		Semifinal		Final	
Athlete	Event	Result	Rank	Result	Rank	Result	Rank	Result	Rank
Joseph Batangdon	200 m	20.92	3 Q	DNS		Did not advance			

Women
Track & road events

Athlete	Event	Heat		Quarterfinal		Semifinal		Final	
Athlete	Event	Result	Rank	Result	Rank	Result	Rank	Result	Rank
Delphine Atangana	100 m	11.40	4 q	11.60	8	Did not advance			
Hortense Béwouda	400 m	52.11	5	—		Did not advance			
Mireille Nguimgo	400 m	51.90	4 q	—		52.21	7	Did not advance	
Muriel Noah Ahanda; Hortense Béwouda; Carole Kaboud Mebam; Mireille Nguimgo	4 × 400 m relay	3:29.93	7	—				Did not advance	

Field events

Athlete	Event	Qualification		Final	
Athlete	Event	Distance	Position	Distance	Position
Françoise Mbango Etone	Triple jump	14.61	9 Q	15.30 AF	1st place, gold medalist(s)

== Boxing ==
Cameroon sent four boxers to Athens. Three of them lost their first bout, while Hassan won two matches by decision before falling in the quarterfinals. Their combined record was 2-4.

Athlete	Event	Round of 32	Round of 16	Quarterfinals	Semifinals	Final	
Athlete	Event	Opposition Result	Opposition Result	Opposition Result	Opposition Result	Opposition Result	Rank
Willy Bertrand Tankeu	Welterweight	Artayev (KAZ); L WO	Did not advance				
Hassan N'Dam N'Jikam	Middleweight	Ubaldo (DOM); W 22^{+}–22	Lee (IRL); W 27^{+}–27	Gaydarbekov (RUS); L 13–26	Did not advance		
Pierre Celestin Yana	Light heavyweight	Lei Yp (CHN); L 16–24	Did not advance				
Carlos Takam	Super heavyweight	—	Aly (EGY); L 19–32	Did not advance			

== Judo ==
Four Cameroonian judoka qualified for the following events.

Athlete	Event	Round of 32	Round of 16	Quarterfinals	Semifinals	Repechage 1	Repechage 2	Repechage 3	Final / BM	
Athlete	Event	Opposition Result	Opposition Result	Opposition Result	Opposition Result	Opposition Result	Opposition Result	Opposition Result	Opposition Result	Rank
Jean-Claude Cameroun	Men's −60 kg	Akhondzadeh (IRI); L 0001–0030	Did not advance			Nazaryan (ARM); W 1000–0000	Zintiridis (GRE); L 0000–1000	Did not advance		
Bernard Mvondo-Etoga	Men's −73 kg	Akbarov (UZB); W 0011–0000	Damdin (MGL); L 0011–0000	Did not advance						
Rostand Melaping	Men's −90 kg	Mesbah (EGY); L 0000–0100	Did not advance							
Franck Moussima	Men's −100 kg	Jang S (KOR); L 0000–1000	Did not advance			Ferguson (USA); W 0011–0001	Ze'evi (ISR); L 0000–0210	Did not advance		

== Swimming ==
Cameroon selected one swimmer through a FINA invitation.

Men

Athlete	Event	Heat		Semifinal		Final	
Athlete	Event	Time	Rank	Time	Rank	Time	Rank
Cole Shade Sule	50 m freestyle	26.16	64	Did not advance			

== Weightlifting ==
Two Cameroonian weightlifters qualified for the following events:

Athlete	Event	Snatch		Clean & Jerk		Total	Rank
Athlete	Event	Result	Rank	Result	Rank	Total	Rank
Vencelas Dabaya	Men's −69 kg	145	7	182.5	5	327.5	5
Madeleine Yamechi	Women's −69 kg	105	=6	130	7	235	7
