= Joël Epalle =

Cameroonian footballer and manager

Personal information
- Full name: Joël Dieudonné Martin Epalle Newaka
- Date of birth: 20 February 1978 (age 48)
- Place of birth: Matomb, Cameroon
- Height: 1.75 m (5 ft 9 in)
- Positions: Midfielder; forward

Team information
- Current team: Val d'Europe FC (Manager)

Youth career
- Union Douala

Senior career*
Years	Team	Apps	(Gls)
–1998	Union Douala		
1998–2000	Ethnikos Piraeus	53	(3)
2000–2001	Panachaiki	44	(3)
2002–2003	Aris	36	(1)
2003–2005	Panathinaikos	15	(1)
2005–2007	Iraklis	56	(21)
2007–2010	VfL Bochum	92	(8)
2010–2011	FK Baku	10	(1)
2011	Iraklis	10	(0)
2012–2013	Sarawak FA	5	(2)

International career^{‡}
1995–2008	Cameroon	34	(2)

Managerial career
- 2014–: Val d'Europe FC
- 2018–2019: Cameroon (assistant)
Medal record
Men's football
Representing Cameroon
Africa Cup of Nations
Winner	2002 Mali
Runner-up	2008 Ghana
FIFA Confederations Cup
Runner-up	2003 France
Olympics
Gold medal – first place	2000 Sydney
- * Club domestic league appearances and goals as of 15 May 2012 ‡ National team caps and goals as of 28 November 2009

Joël Dieudonné Martin Epalle Newaka (born 20 February 1978) is a Cameroonian football manager and former player who manages Val d'Europe FC.

He mainly played as a right midfielder, but throughout his career he also played as a second striker, more noticeably during his first spell at Iraklis. He was born in Matomb, Cameroon and played youth football in Cameroonian club Union Douala, the team for which he made his senior debut. After his spell in Cameroon, in 1998, he moved to Greece where he played football for several clubs, including Ethnikos Piraeus, Panachaiki, Aris, Panathinaikos and Iraklis in a time span of 9 1/2 years. Subsequently, in January 2007, he moved to Bundesliga outfit VfL Bochum where he played for 3 1/2 years. After a brief stay at Azerbaijani club FK Baku, in January 2011 he returned to Greece to have a second spell at Iraklis. Epalle was Iraklis' top-scorer for the 2005–06 season. Started at the end of March 2012, he made his first appearance and play for Sarawak FA alongside his fellow Cameroon friend, Guy Bwele.

Epalle won 31 caps for Cameroon. He was a member of the Cameroon side that won the gold medal in the 2000 Summer Olympics football tournament. Epalle was also a member of the Cameroon squad that won the 2002 African Cup of Nations.

== Club career ==
=== Early career ===
He began his career in his local team called Union Douala.

=== Ethnikos ===
Epalle signed for Greek club Ethnikos in December 1997. Until the end of the season Epalle played in 16 matches for the club of Piraeus. In his second season for the club, Epalle continued appearing regularly, totalling 23 matches, not managing to help his club avoid relegation. In the Beta Ethniki Epalle managed to score his first goal for Ethnikos in a match against Apollon Kalamarias. He managed to score two more, before leaving the club during the winter transfer window.

=== Panachaiki ===
During the winter transfer window of the 1999-00 season Epalle signed for Panachaiki. He signed a two-year contract on a free transfer, on 26 January 2000, after gaining his freedom from Ethnikos, due to the club's debt to him. Epalle debuted for Panachaiki on 29 January 2000, in a 0–2 home win against Olympiacos. In his first season in Patras Epalle featured in 15 league matches and scored two goals. Epalle played for Panachaiki for almost two years and totalled three goals out of 44 appearances.

=== Aris ===
Epalle left them for Aris.

=== Panathinaikos ===
After being released from Aris, Epalle signed a four-year contract for Greek club Panathinaikos in July 2003, stating his ambition to win trophies for Panathinaikos. Epalle made his debut for Panathinaikos in the first round of the 2003–04 season, as he was in the starting lineup in Panathinaikos' 1–0 home win against Skoda Xanthi. He scored his first goal for Panathinaikos in a 6–3 home win against Panionios for the fifteenth round of the 2003–04 season. Until the end of the season Epalle appeared in 15 league matches scoring one goal. He also played his first match in a European competition as he came in at halftime of a 5–0 away defeat against Manchester United. In the next season Epalle did not get any chances in the league, and he only appeared in two Champions League matches. On 7 January 2005, Epalle was released by Panathinaikos to empty a foreign player's spot, so the club would be able to sign Brazilian defensive midfielder Anderson de Lima Freitas.

=== Iraklis ===
Briefly after his release, Iraklis decided to sign him.

=== VfL Bochum ===
In January 2007, Epalle signed a 3 1/2-year contract with VfL Bochum. The transfer fee was €600,000. Epalle debuted for VfL Bochum in a home match against Mainz. He played in the whole match but Mainz managed to win the match by 1–0 in a close encounter. In the next match Epalle was once again a starter and he helped Bochum to get an away 0–0 draw from German giants FC Bayern. Epalle's first major contribution to the team came in a match against Arminia Bielefeld. He dribbled in the centre of the field before passing the ball towards Gekas to help him score the second goal of their team in what was meant to be a 3–1 away win for Bochum. In the match Epalle scored his first goal for Bochum. A corner was taken by his teammate Misimović, an Alemannia Aachen defender poorly cleared the ball, and Epalle took advantage of the loose ball to score his team's second goal, in a match that finished 2–2. Epalle continued showing his scoring abilities, as he send the ball to settle in the net of Hannover 96, during a count-attack of his team, to make the score 2–0, that was also the final score of the match. He also proved himself to be highly effective in front of the goal in an away match against Eintracht Frankfurt by scoring twice. His first goal was a powerful effort from just outside the area in the 58th minute of the match and second was scored in the 69th minute after an assist by Gekas. In his first season for Bochum Epalle played in all 17 Bundesliga matches in the second round of the 2006–07 campaign (all as a starter), scored four goals and handed three assists to his teammates.

In the opening stages of the 2008–09 season Epalle was forced to miss several matches due to a toe injury. He was able to make his come back, in a 0–0 home draw against Werder Bremen, after replacing the injured Christian Fuchs in the 42nd minute.

On 11 June 2010, Bochum announced that the contract of Epalle would not be extended beyond its original expiry date on 30 June 2010. During his spell at Bochum he became a firm favorite amongst his teammates and the club's fans due to his hard-working style of play and the trademark back-flip celebration of his goals.

=== FK Baku ===
In the summer of 2010, Epalle signed a contract with Azerbaijan Premier League outfit FK Baku, to meet again with Winfried Schäfer, his former manager for the Indomitable Lions. His first game for FK Baku was on 15 July, for the second qualifying round of UEFA Europa League, against Budućnost of Montenegro. Epalle was suspended for that match, as he was sent off in an Iraklis match four years ago against Wisła Kraków, and due to this Budućnost gained a 3–0 default win, in a match they had originally lost 2–1. Epalle was handed a further two-match suspension. He made his league debut for his new club on 22 August in a 2–1 home win against Gabala. He was substituted in the 83rd minute of the match for Ibrahim Kargbo. The next match he featured, was a 1–1 home draw against Ganja on 12 September. In November his agent stated that Epalle was not happy with the lifestyle of Azerbaijan and with the situation in Azerbaijani football. The main reasons for that reaction was the low attendance of Azerbaijani Premier League and the fact that he could do nothing besides training and staying in his hotel room. His agent also declared Epalle's desire to return in the Super League Greece for Iraklis. He played again on 13 November coming in as a substitute for Aleksandar Šolić in the 78th minute, in a match that FK Baku won 2–0. In the next match against MOIK Baku he came in as an 84th-minute substitute, and he managed to score a goal in the 88th minute, his first and only goal for FK Baku. In his short spell for FK Baku Epalle totally played in ten matches and scored one goal.

=== Iraklis ===
"I'm glad to return and I will go from strength to strength for our supporters. I missed life in Thessaloniki, and the love of our fans as well. That's why I came back and I hope that everything will go fine, so I can finish my career here. In Iraklis it feels like home."

— Joël Epalle, upon returning to Iraklis in January 2011.

On 18 January 2011, Epalle signed a two-and-a-half-year contract with Iraklis. He made his first appearance, in his second spell for the club, in a 0–0 home draw against Kerkyra, as he came in, to replace Javier Robles, in the 55th minute of the match.

=== Sarawak FA ===
On 2 April 2012, Epalle officially signed with Sarawak FA. On 24 March 2012, he made his first appearance with Sarawak FA against Malaysia national football team in a friendly match at State Stadium, Kuching. The match ended with draw 1–1. Epalle scored the equalizer. His official league debut, in the game against Kelantan FA on 7 April 2012, saw Epalle fouled and he received a free-kick in the 18th minute which led to a goal by Guy Bwele in the 1–1 draw. His first goal for Sarawak was scored against Kuala Lumpur FA, an equaliser in a 1–1 draw on 4 May 2012.

== International career ==
Epalle was capped with Cameroon and was a participant at the 2000 Olympic Games and at the 2002 FIFA World Cup. So far, he gained 31 caps with Cameroon and scored two goals. His first cap for Cameroon was on 26 November 1995, in a match against Gabon in Libreville for Bellier Africa Tournament. His debut was made while aged 17 years and 283, making him the tenth youngest player to gain a full cap for Cameroon at that time (16th nowadays).

=== 2000 Summer Olympics football tournament ===
Epalle played in the opening match of Cameroon, coming in as a substitute in the 78th minute for Serge Branco, in a match that his team won by a 3–2 scoreline. He started the next match against United States, a 1–1 draw, but he was substituted by Daniel Kome in the 65th minute, just after the United States team scored its goal. He was benched in the two next matches, a 1–1 draw against the Czech Republic. The situation did not change in the quarter-final match against Brazil, a match that Cameroon won 2–1 after extra time. He featured again in the semi-final, a 1–2 win over Chile, as he came in to replace Modeste Mbami in the 65th minute. In the final, against Spain he came in as a substitute in the 91st minute to replace Serge Branco for the extra-time. The score was 2–2 after extra-time and Cameroon finally won 5–3 in the penalty shoot-out to be named Olympic gold medallists.

=== 2008 Africa Cup of Nations ===
Epalle was a starter in the opening match of the tournament for the "Indomitable Lions", a 4–2 loss against defending champions Egypt. He was an unused substitute in Cameroon's 5–1 win against Zambia, but he reappeared in the final match of the group stage, a 3–0 win against Sudan. In the quarter-final against Tunisia he came in as a substitute in the 62nd minute for Emana to help his team win the match, as he assisted Mbia, with a flick-on, to score the match decider in extra time. In the semi-final, Epalle came in for Idrissou in the start of second half to help his team advance to the final. In the final Epalle was at the starting eleven, but he was substituted, in the 65th minute by M'bami, in a match that saw Egypt crowned Africa Cup of Nations champions for a sixth time.

== Coaching career ==
Ahead of the 2014–15 season, Epalle was appointed manager of French Regional club Val d'Europe FC. In September 2018 it was confirmed, that Epalle beside his manager position at Val d'Europe FC, also had been appointed the assistant manager of Cameroon national football team under newly appointed manager Clarence Seedorf alongside Patrick Kluivert and Jean-Alain Boumsong.

== Personal life ==
Epalle is married to Mari, with whom he has two daughters Marilyn and Zonti, both born in Greece and a son born in Paris. He is also a cousin of his fellow Cameroon international Timothée Atouba.

== Honours ==
Panathinaikos

- Alpha Ethniki: 2003–04
- Greek Cup: 2003–04

Aris

- Greek Cup: runner-up 2002–03

Cameroon

- African Cup of Nations: 2002; runner-up, 2008
- FIFA Confederations Cup: runner up, 2003

Cameroon U23

- Olympic Gold Medal: 2000
