= Cameroon Handball Federation =

Governing body of handball in Cameroon

Cameroon Handball Federation French: Fédération Camerounaise de Handball CHF
- IOC nation: Republic of Cameroon (CMR)
- Sport: Handball
- Other sports: Beach handball
- Official website: www.fecahand.net

HISTORY
- Year of formation: 1970; 55 years ago

AFFILIATIONS
- International federation: International Handball Federation (IHF)
- IHF member since: 1970
- Continental association: African Handball Confederation
- National Olympic Committee: Cameroon Olympic and Sports Committee

GOVERNING BODY
- President: Lippert Daniel Raymond Mbita Mvaebeme

HEADQUARTERS
- Address: Boîte Postale 1078, Yaoundé
- Country: Cameroon
- Secretary General: Laurent Kuete Tatsabon

The Cameroon Handball Federation (French: Fédération Camerounaise de Handball) (CHF) is the administrative and controlling body for handball and beach handball in the Republic of Cameroon. Founded in 1970, CHF is a member of African Handball Confederation (CAHB) and the International Handball Federation (IHF).

== National teams ==
- Cameroon men's national handball team
- Cameroon men's national junior handball team
- Cameroon women's national handball team
