= Ismael Ruiz =

Spanish footballer

Ismael
Personal information
- Full name: Ismael Ruiz Salmón
- Date of birth: 7 July 1977 (age 49)
- Place of birth: Santander, Spain
- Height: 1.87 m (6 ft 1 1/2 in)
- Position: Midfielder

Youth career
- 1991–1992: Rayo Cantabria
- 1992–1995: Racing Santander

Senior career*
Years	Team	Apps	(Gls)
1995–1997	Racing B		
1995–2003	Racing Santander	160	(10)
2003–2007	Terrassa	32	(2)
2005–2006	→ Oviedo (loan)	23	(0)
2007–2008	Benidorm	17	(0)
Total		232+	(12+)

International career
1995	Spain U18	6	(0)
1997	Spain U20	7	(0)
1998–2000	Spain U21	12	(0)
2000	Spain U23	2	(0)
- * Club domestic league appearances and goals

Olympic medal record

Representing Spain

Men's Football
Silver medal – second place	2000 Sydney	Team competition

Ismael Ruiz Salmón (born 7 July 1977 in Santander, Cantabria), known simply as Ismael, is a Spanish former professional footballer who played as a central midfielder.

== Honours ==
Spain U18

- UEFA European Under-18 Championship: 1995

Spain U23

- Summer Olympic silver medal: 2000
