= Dieudonné Ntep =

Cameroonian cyclist (1959–2021)

Personal information
- Born: 28 December 1959
- Died: 10 May 2021 (aged 61) Mbankomo, Cameroon

Cycling career
- Sport: Cycling

Dieudonné Ntep (28 December 1959 – 10 May 2021) was a Cameroonian cyclist and directeur sportif. He competed in the individual road race and the team time trial events at the 1984 Summer Olympics. After his cycling career he became active as a cycling trainer. Until his death he was head coach of Cameroon's national cycling team, where he was the coach for over 10 years. Ntep was a key figure in grooming the best cyclists of Cameroon.

In May 2021, he was killed in a road crash when the a mini-bus where he was sitting in was hit by a truck along the Yaoundé-Douala highway near the Mbankomo toll gate. Ntep was travelling to Douala with members of the Cameroon Cycling Federation to finalise the traveling requirements before taking off for the 2021 International Cycling Tour of Benin. He was 61 years old.
