= Michel Bilamo =

Cameroonian footballer

Personal information
- Position: Defender

International career
Years	Team	Apps	(Gls)
- Cameroon

Michel Bilamo is a Cameroonian footballer. He competed in the men's tournament at the 1984 Summer Olympics.
