= Iván Amaya =

Spanish footballer (born 1978)

Personal information
- Full name: Iván Amaya Carazo
- Date of birth: 3 September 1978 (age 48)
- Place of birth: Madrid, Spain
- Height: 1.87 m (6 ft 2 in)
- Position: Centre-back

Team information
- Current team: Racing Madrid (manager)

Youth career
- San Cristóbal
- Rayo Vallecano

Senior career*
Years	Team	Apps	(Gls)
1997–1998	Rayo Vallecano B	35	(2)
1998–2000	Rayo Vallecano	33	(1)
2000–2002	Atlético Madrid	18	(0)
2002–2003	Espanyol	11	(0)
2003–2004	Getafe	45	(1)
2005–2007	Ciudad Murcia	97	(2)
2007–2009	Elche	41	(1)
2009–2010	Udinese	0	(0)
2009–2010	→ Granada (loan)	36	(3)
2010–2012	Murcia	64	(2)
2012	Apollon Limassol	1	(0)
2013	S.S. Reyes	15	(3)
2013–2015	Puerta Bonita	?	(5)
Total		396	(20)

International career
2000	Spain U21	4	(0)
2000	Spain U23	6	(0)

Managerial career
- 2019–2022: Rayo Vallecano (youth)
- 2022–2023: Rayo Vallecano B
- 2023–: Racing Madrid
- * Club domestic league appearances and goals

Olympic medal record

Representing Spain

Men's Football
Silver medal – second place	2000 Sydney	Team competition

Iván Amaya Carazo (born 3 September 1978) is a Spanish former professional footballer who played as a central defender. He is the manager of Racing Madrid.

== Club career ==
Born in Madrid, Amaya started his career at hometown's Rayo Vallecano, totalling 31 games with the first team in his first two seasons, the first of which was spent in the Segunda División with promotion. After that, he returned to the second tier but stayed in the city, joining Atlético Madrid for another couple of years and being rarely utilised.

At the end of another unassuming La Liga spell with RCD Espanyol, Amaya appeared in 40 matches for Getafe CF in 2003–04, promoting to the top flight for the third time (a first-ever for Getafe). However, he featured very rarely the following campaign after falling out with manager Quique Sánchez Flores, returning to division two in January 2005 as he joined Ciudad de Murcia.

Amaya then spent two seasons in the second tier, with Elche CF. In July 2009, he was bought by Udinese Calcio, being immediately loaned back to Spain with lowly Granada CF; his compatriot Óscar Pérez, who was also purchased by the Italians, made the same season-long move as seven other players after the two sides' partnership agreement.

After helping the Andalusians to promote to the second division, Amaya's loan was renewed for 2010–11, but his contract with Granada was terminated on 26 August 2010. The next day, he was signed by Real Murcia CF of Segunda División B.

== International career ==
Amaya was selected by Spain for their 2000 Summer Olympics squad. He helped the national team to win silver in Sydney but, in the decisive match against Cameroon, scored an own goal to make it 2–1 for the Europeans (eventually 2–2) and also missed his penalty shootout attempt, in an eventual loss.

== Personal life ==
Amaya's younger brother, Antonio, was also a footballer – and a centre-back. He also represented local club Rayo.

The pair came from a Romani family.

== Honours ==
Spain U23

- Summer Olympic silver medal: 2000
