= Jordi Ferrón =

Spanish footballer and manager

Personal information
- Full name: Jordi Ferrón Forné
- Date of birth: 15 August 1978 (age 48)
- Place of birth: Badalona, Spain
- Height: 1.79 m (5 ft 10 in)
- Position: Right-back

Youth career
- 1986–1997: Barcelona

Senior career*
Years	Team	Apps	(Gls)
1995–1997	Barcelona C	34	(2)
1997–1999	Barcelona B	74	(0)
1999–2000	Rayo Vallecano	35	(7)
2000–2004	Zaragoza	57	(0)
2002	→ Rayo Vallecano (loan)	17	(0)
2004–2008	Albacete	95	(2)
2008–2014	Badalona	180	(0)
2014–2015	Cabrera		
Total		492	(11)

International career
1994–1995	Spain U16	8	(0)
1995	Spain U17	3	(1)
1996–1997	Spain U18	11	(2)
1999–2000	Spain U21	4	(2)
2000	Spain U23	5	(0)

Managerial career
- 2015–2019: Seagull (women)
- 2019–2020: Espanyol (women)
- 2022: Eibar (women)
- 2023–2025: INAC Leonessa (women)
- * Club domestic league appearances and goals

Olympic medal record

Representing Spain

Men's Football
Silver medal – second place	2000 Sydney	Team competition

Jordi Ferrón Forné (born 15 August 1978) is a Spanish former professional footballer who played mainly as a right-back, currently a manager.

== Playing career ==
Born in Badalona, Barcelona, Catalonia, Ferrón was a product of FC Barcelona's prolific youth ranks at La Masia. After failing to be promoted to the first team he had a breakthrough season in 1999–2000, scoring seven La Liga goals to help Rayo Vallecano to their best finish ever – ninth; he started his career as a midfielder.

Subsequently, Ferrón moved to Real Zaragoza, but would be irregularly used in his new club, which also prompted a January 2002 loan to fellow top-division Rayo. The player's contributions again proved helpful in an eventual mid-table position, as the former were in turn relegated.

Following an uneventful last year at Zaragoza, Ferrón joined Albacete Balompié for 2004–05, taking part in only one game in a season that also ended in top-tier relegation. In the next three Segunda División campaigns, however, he was an undisputed starter, appearing also at right-back.

Ferrón signed with local side CF Badalona for 2008–09, his first season in the Segunda División B after totalling 242 matches across the two main divisions.

== Coaching career ==
Ferrón retired in June 2015 at the age of 37, following one year as player-coach of amateurs UE Cabrera. Afterwards, also at the regional level, he managed the women's team of CE Seagull from his hometown.

On 10 December 2019, Ferrón signed as head coach of RCD Espanyol. He continued to work in women's football the following seasons, with SD Eibar and INAC Kobe Leonessa.

== Honours ==
Zaragoza

- Copa del Rey: 2001–02, 2003–04

Spain U23

- Summer Olympic silver medal: 2000
