= Football at the 2000 Summer Olympics =

Football at the Games of the XXVII Olympiad
- Football pictogram for the 2000 Summer Olympics

Event details
- Games: 2000 Summer Olympics
- Host country: Australia
- Dates: 13–30 September 2000
- Venues: 6 (in 5 host cities)
- Competitors: 391 from 20 nations

Men's tournament
- Teams: 16 (from 5 confederations)
Medalists
Gold	Cameroon
Silver	Spain
Bronze	Chile

Women's tournament
- Teams: 8 (from 6 confederations)
Medalists
Gold	Norway
Silver	United States
Bronze	Germany

Editions
- ← 1996 2004 →

The 2000 Football at the Summer Olympics tournament at the 2000 Summer Olympics started on 13 September. The men's tournament is played by U-23 (under 23 years old) national teams, with up to three over age players allowed per squad. Article 1 of the tournament regulations states: "The Tournaments take place every four years, in conjunction with the Summer Olympic Games. The associations affiliated to FIFA are invited to participate with their men's U-23 and women's representative teams."

== Venues ==
Location map of host suburbs in Sydney.		Location map of host cities.			
Sydney		Canberra	Adelaide	Brisbane	Melbourne
Olympic Stadium	Sydney Football Stadium	Bruce Stadium	Hindmarsh Stadium*	Brisbane Cricket Ground	Melbourne Cricket Ground
Capacity: 110,000	Capacity: 43,000	Capacity: 25,011	Capacity: 20,000	Capacity: 36,000	Capacity: 98,000
33°50′50″S 151°3′48″E	33°53′21″S 151°13′31″E	35°15′0″S 149°6′10″E	34°54′27″S 138°34′8″E	27°29′9″S 153°2′17″E	37°49′12″S 144°59′0″E

* Hindmarsh Stadium only used during the Men's tournament. Temporary seating was added for the games. Olympic Stadium only used during the Men's tournament final.

== Competition schedule ==
P	Preliminaries	¼	Quarterfinals	½	Semifinals	B	3rd place play-off	F	Final

Event↓/Date →	Wed 13	Thu 14	Fri 15	Sat 16	Sun 17	Mon 18	Tue 19	Wed 20	Thu 21	Fri 22	Sat 23	Sun 24	Mon 25	Tue 26	Wed 27	Thu 28		Fri 29	Sat 30
Men	P	P		P	P		P	P			¼			½				B	F
Women	P	P		P	P		P	P				½				B	F		

== Medal summary ==
=== Medal table ===
Rank	Nation	Gold	Silver	Bronze	Total
1	Cameroon	1	0	0	1
1	Norway	1	0	0	1
3	Spain	0	1	0	1
3	United States	0	1	0	1
5	Chile	0	0	1	1
5	Germany	0	0	1	1
Totals (6 entries)		2	2	2	6

=== Events ===
Event	Gold	Silver	Bronze
Men	Cameroon; Samuel Eto'o; Serge Mimpo; Clément Beaud; Aaron Nguimbat; Joël Epalle; Modeste M'bami; Patrice Abanda; Nicolas Alnoudji; Daniel Bekono; Serge Branco; Lauren; Carlos Kameni; Patrick Mboma; Albert Meyong; Daniel Kome; Geremi; Patrick Suffo; Pierre Womé	Spain; David Albelda; Iván Amaya; Miguel Ángel Angulo; Daniel Aranzubia; Joan Capdevila; Jordi Ferrón; Gabri; Xavi; Jesús Lacruz; Albert Luque; Carlos Marchena; Felip Ortiz; Carles Puyol; José María Romero; Ismael; Raúl Tamudo; Antonio Velamazán; Unai Vergara	Chile; Pedro Reyes; Nelson Tapia; Héctor Tapia; Iván Zamorano; Javier di Gregorio; Cristián Álvarez; Francisco Arrué; Pablo Contreras; Sebastián González; David Henríquez; Manuel Ibarra; Claudio Maldonado; Reinaldo Navia; Rodrigo Núñez; Rafael Olarra; Patricio Ormazábal; David Pizarro; Rodrigo Tello; Mauricio Rojas
Women	Norway; Gro Espeseth; Bente Nordby; Marianne Pettersen; Hege Riise; Kristin Bekkevold; Ragnhild Gulbrandsen; Solveig Gulbrandsen; Margunn Haugenes; Ingeborg Hovland; Christine Bøe Jensen; Silje Jørgensen; Monica Knudsen; Gøril Kringen; Anne Tønnessen; Unni Lehn; Dagny Mellgren; Anita Rapp; Brit Sandaune; Bente Kvitland	United States; Brandi Chastain; Joy Fawcett; Julie Foudy; Mia Hamm; Michelle French; Kristine Lilly; Tiffeny Milbrett; Carla Overbeck; Cindy Parlow; Briana Scurry; Lorrie Fair; Shannon MacMillan; Siri Mullinix; Christie Pearce; Nikki Serlenga; Danielle Slaton; Kate Sobrero; Sara Whalen	Germany; Ariane Hingst; Melanie Hoffmann; Steffi Jones; Renate Lingor; Maren Meinert; Sandra Minnert; Claudia Müller; Birgit Prinz; Silke Rottenberg; Kerstin Stegemann; Bettina Wiegmann; Tina Wunderlich; Nicole Brandebusemeyer; Nadine Angerer; Doris Fitschen; Jeannette Götte; Stefanie Gottschlich; Inka Grings

== Men's tournament ==
Group A	Group B	Group C	Group D
Australia; Honduras; Italy; Nigeria	Chile; Morocco; South Korea; Spain	Cameroon; Czech Republic; Kuwait; United States	Brazil; Japan; Slovakia; South Africa

== Women's tournament ==
Group E	Group F
Australia; Brazil; Germany; Sweden	China; Nigeria; Norway; United States

== Awards ==
=== FIFA Fair Play Award ===
Country
- Brazil
