= Nicolas Alnoudji =

Cameroonian footballer (born 1979)

Personal information
- Date of birth: 9 December 1979 (age 46)
- Place of birth: Garoua, Cameroon
- Height: 1.84 m (6 ft 0 in)
- Position: Midfielder

Senior career*
Years	Team	Apps	(Gls)
1999–2000	Cotonsport Garoua	28	(1)
2000	Tonnerre Yaoundé	23	(5)
2000–2002	Çaykur Rizespor	37	(0)
2002–2003	Paris Saint-Germain	0	(0)
2002–2003	→ Bastia (loan)	12	(0)
2003	→ Al-Ahli (loan)		
2003–2004	Sedan	15	(3)
2004	Al-Sailiya SC	7	(0)
2004	Al-Ain	12	(2)
2004–2005	R.A.E.C. Mons	0	(0)
2005–2007	Olhanense	36	(0)
2007–2008	US Créteil	24	(0)
2008	Pandurii Târgu Jiu	0	(0)
2009–2010	JS Saint-Pierroise	20	(1)
2010–2011	Cotonsport Garoua	23	(7)

International career
2000–2002	Cameroon	17	(0)
Medal record
Men's football
Representing Cameroon
Africa Cup of Nations
Winner	2002 Mali
Olympics
Gold medal – first place	2000 Sydney
- * Club domestic league appearances and goals

Nicolas Alnoudji (born 9 December 1979) is a Cameroonian former professional footballer who played as a midfielder. Between 2000 and 2002, he made 17 appearances for the Cameroon national team.

== International career ==
Alnoudji played for Cameroon national team and was a participant at the 2000 Olympic Games (where he won a gold medal) and at the 2002 FIFA World Cup. He was also part of the Cameroon team who won the 2002 African Cup of Nations.

== Career statistics ==
Appearances and goals by club, season and competition
Club	Season	League			Cup		Continental		Other		Total		Ref.
Club	Season	Division	Apps	Goals	Apps	Goals	Apps	Goals	Apps	Goals	Apps	Goals	Ref.
Cotonsport Garoua	1999	Cameroon Première Division											
Tonnerre Yaoundé	2000	Cameroon Première Division											
Çaykur Rizespor	2000–01	Süper Lig	18	0									
Çaykur Rizespor	2001–02	Süper Lig	19	0									
Çaykur Rizespor	Total		37	0									–
Bastia	2002–03	Ligue 1	12	0									
Cotonsport Garoua	2003	Cameroon Première Division											
Cotonsport Garoua	2004	Cameroon Première Division											
Cotonsport Garoua	Total												–
Olhanense	2005–06	Liga de Honra	26	0									
Olhanense	2006–07	Liga de Honra	10	0									
Olhanense	Total		36	0									–
US Créteil	2006–07	Ligue 2	5	0									
US Créteil	2007–08	Ligue 2	19	0									
US Créteil	Total		24	0									–

== Honours ==
Cameroon

- African Cup of Nations: 2002; runner-up 2008

Cameroon U-23

- Olympic Gold Medal: 2000
