= Pierre Womé =

Cameroonian footballer (born 1979)

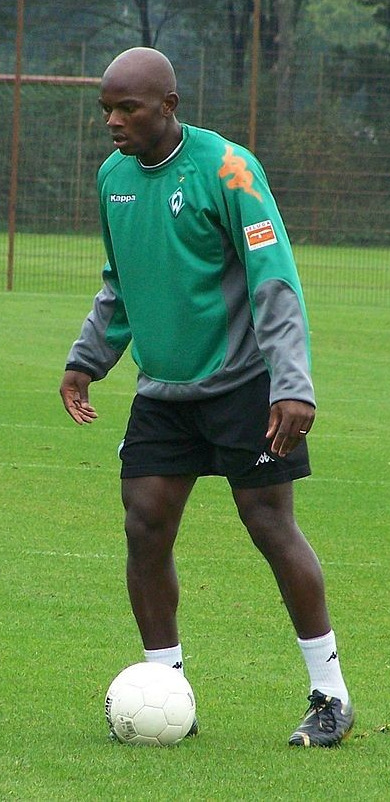
- Womé with Werder Bremen in 2006

Personal information
- Full name: Pierre Nlend Womé
- Date of birth: 26 March 1979 (age 47)
- Place of birth: Douala, Cameroon
- Height: 1.81 m (5 ft 11 in)
- Position: Left-back

Youth career
- 1993–1994: Fogape
- 1994–1996: Canon Yaoundé

Senior career*
Years	Team	Apps	(Gls)
1996–1997	Vicenza	3	(0)
1997–1998	Lucchese	24	(2)
1998–1999	Roma	8	(0)
1999–2002	Bologna	47	(3)
2002–2003	Fulham	14	(1)
2003–2004	Espanyol	23	(1)
2005	Brescia	16	(3)
2005–2006	Inter Milan	13	(0)
2006–2008	Werder Bremen	28	(2)
2008–2010	1. FC Köln	30	(0)
2011–2012	Sapins	17	(0)
2012–2014	Canon Yaoundé	25	(5)
2014	UMS de Loum	0	(0)
2014	Renaissance de Ngoumou		
2014–2015	Chambly	21	(0)
2015–2016	Roye-Noyon	18	(2)
Total		287	(19)

International career
2000	Cameroon Olympic		
1995–2013	Cameroon	68	(1)
Medal record
Representing Cameroon
Africa Cup of Nations
Winner	2000 Ghana-Nigeria
Winner	2002 Mali
Olympics
Gold medal – first place	2000 Sydney
- * Club domestic league appearances and goals

Pierre Nlend Womé (born 26 March 1979) is a Cameroonian former professional footballer who played as a left-back.

A journeyman, he played for 14 clubs in six countries. At international level, he made 68 official FIFA appearances scoring one goal for the Cameroon national team.

== Club career ==
After spending his youth career at Fogape Yaoundé and the relatively eminent regional side Canon Yaoundé, Womé moved to Italy from Cameroon in the summer of 1996 to start his professional career. He began his senior career at Vicenza Calcio and spent almost seven years playing in Italy until moving to English Premier League side Fulham FC in August 2002. He was sold to Bologna FC 1909 in a co-ownership deal for 6 billion lire in 1999, until Roma acquired him for 2 billion lire in the same summer that Francesco Antonioli, Amedeo Mangone and Alessandro Rinaldi joined Roma for 10 billion lire, 13 billion lire and 6 billion lire respectively. In June 2000 Bologna acquired Womé outright for a fee of 1 million lire. During his time in England at Fulham, Womé scored once in the league, in a 3–0 win over West Brom in February 2003.

After playing for some notable clubs, including RCD Espanyol, Inter Milan and Werder Bremen, Womé joined 1. FC Köln in the summer of 2008 and left the team on 30 June 2010.

In late February 2012, it was announced that Womé would join Coton Sport FC de Garoua in his homeland.

From 2012 to 2014, Womé played for Canon Yaoundé, also of the Elite One.

In January 2014, he moved to Canon Yaoundé's league rivals UMS de Loum. After not having made an appearance under two coaches, he decided to leave the city and return to Yaoundé. The club's president, Pierre Kwemo, threatened to take Womé to court for "fraud and breach of trust". In March, two months after joining the club, he agreed the termination of his contract.

In March 2014, shortly after his release by UMS de Loum, he joined Renaissance de Ngoumou.

In September 2014, Womé signed with Championnat National side FC Chambly.

In 2015, he joined French fourth-tier side US Roye-Noyon.

== International career ==
Womé was a regular starter in the left back position for Cameroon during the late 1990s and early 2000s. He was a key member of the squads that won consecutive African Cup of Nations titles in 2000 and 2002 and the Olympic gold medal in 2000. All three tournaments were won on penalty shoot-outs, and Womé was a taker in all three victories. In the Olympic gold medal match, Womé scored the fifth and decisive penalty to win the title for his country. He also scored from the spot in the 2000 African Cup of Nations final, but his penalty in the following tournament was saved by Senegal's Tony Sylva. Womé also played as Cameroon's first-choice left back in the 1998 and 2002 FIFA World Cups.

On 8 October 2005, Womé missed a 95th-minute penalty during Cameroon's final World Cup qualifier against Egypt that would have sent the Indomitable Lions to the 2006 FIFA World Cup; unfortunately for Womé he cannoned the shot off the outside of the post, the match ended 1–1 and the Ivory Coast qualified at their expense. Womé later claimed that some Cameroon fans wanted to kill him as a result of the miss.

On 19 March 2007, Womé announced his retirement from international football. He later returned to the team in 2009 for a 2010 FIFA World Cup qualification match against Morocco.

== Post-playing career ==
In March 2017, Womé was appointed sporting director of Canon Yaoundé by the club's president Emmannuel Mve.

== Career statistics ==
Score and result list Cameroon's goal tally first, score column indicates score after Womé goal.

International goal scored by Pierre Womé
No.	Date	Venue	Opponent	Score	Result	Competition
1	11 February 1998	Stade Municipal, Ouagadougou, Burkina Faso	Guinea	2–1	2–2	1998 Africa Cup of Nations

== Honours ==
Werder Bremen

- DFL-Ligapokal: 2006

Cameroon

- African Cup of Nations: 2000, 2002

Cameroon U23

- Olympic Gold Medal: 2000
