= Serge Mimpo =

Cameroonian footballer

Personal information
- Full name: Serge Mimpo-Tsintsémé
- Date of birth: 6 February 1974 (age 52)
- Place of birth: Ndom, Cameroon
- Height: 1.75 m (5 ft 9 in)
- Position: Defensive midfielder

Senior career*
Years	Team	Apps	(Gls)
1994–1995	Canon Yaoundé		
1996–1999	Panachaiki	29	(1)
2000–2001	Ethnikos Asteras	3	(0)
2003–2009	Paris FC	126	(4)
2009–2010	Red Star	27	(0)
2011–2012	Aubervilliers	1	(0)
2012–2013	USA Clichy		

International career
2000	Cameroon Olympic (O.P.)	6	(0)
2001	Cameroon	1	(0)
Medal record
Representing Cameroon
Men's Football
Gold medal – first place	2000 Sydney	Team competition
- * Club domestic league appearances and goals

Serge Mimpo-Tsintsémé (born 6 February 1974) is a Cameroonian former professional footballer who played as a defensive midfielder. He also holds French citizenship.

He played on the professional level in Super League Greece for Panachaiki and Ethnikos Asteras F.C.

== Honours ==
- Olympic champion: 2000.
