= Aaron Nguimbat =

Cameroonian footballer

Personal information
- Date of birth: 13 March 1978 (age 48)
- Place of birth: Yaounde, Cameroon
- Height: 1.82 m (6 ft 0 in)
- Position: Defender

Senior career*
| Years | Team | Apps | (Gls) |
| 2000–2002 | Canon Yaounde | | |
| 2002–2005 | Skonto Riga | | |
| 2005–2007 | Unisport Bafang | | |
| 2007–2009 | Sriwijaya FC | 35 | (6) |

International career
| 2000–2005 | Cameroon | | |
Medal record
Men's football
Representing Cameroon
Olympic Games
| Gold medal – first place | 2000 Sydney | Team Competition |
- * Club domestic league appearances and goals

Aaron Nguimbat (born 13 March 1978) is a Cameroonian former professional footballer who played as a defender. He represented Cameroon at the 2000 Sydney Olympics where he won a gold medal.
