= Clément Beaud =

Cameroonian footballer (born 1980)

Personal information
- Date of birth: 7 December 1980 (age 45)
- Place of birth: Cameroon
- Height: 1.84 m (6 ft 0 in)
- Position: Midfielder

Youth career
- Ports FC

Senior career*
| Years | Team | Apps | (Gls) |
| 2000–2001 | Tonnerre Yaoundé | | |
| 2001–2003 | Widzew Łódź | 6 | (0) |
| 2003–2004 | FK Vėtra | 22 | (0) |
| 2004–2005 | Académica de Coimbra | 0 | (0) |
| 2005–2006 | Moreirense | 18 | (0) |
| 2006–2007 | Esmoriz | 17 | (0) |
| 2007–2008 | Académico de Viseu | 26 | (1) |
| 2008 | Penalva do Castelo | 12 | (0) |
| 2009 | Operário | 15 | (0) |
| 2009–2011 | Cinfães | 57 | (1) |
| 2011–2012 | Lamego | 29 | (0) |
| 2012–2013 | Vitória Sernache | 14 | (0) |

International career
| 2000 | Cameroon U23 | | |
Medal record
Men's football
Representing Cameroon
Olympic Games
| Gold medal – first place | 2000 Sydney | Team |
- * Club domestic league appearances and goals

Clément Beaud (born 7 December 1980) is a Cameroonian former professional footballer who played as a midfielder.

== Career ==
Beaud began playing football with Tonnerre Yaoundé in Cameroon. He went to Europe, where he would play in Poland and Lithuania before moving to Portugal for much of his career. After a brief spell in the Portuguese Liga with Associação Académica de Coimbra, he has spent most of his time in the second and third levels of Portuguese football, including stints with Moreirense and Esmoriz. Now play in Grupo Desportivo Vitória de sernache.

Beaud played for the gold medal-winning Cameroon squad at the 2000 Summer Olympics in Sydney.

== Honours ==
Cameroon U23

- Olympic gold medal: 2000
