= Daniel Bekono =

Cameroonian footballer

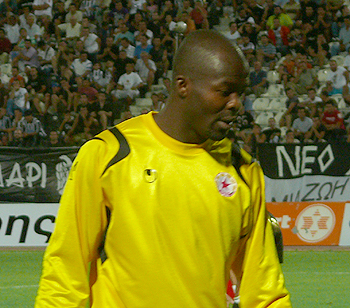
- Bekono with CSKA Sofia in 2008

Personal information
- Full name: Daniel N'Dene Bekono
- Date of birth: 31 May 1978 (age 48)
- Place of birth: Yaoundé, Cameroon
- Height: 1.84 m (6 ft 0 in)
- Position: Goalkeeper

Senior career*
| Years | Team | Apps | (Gls) |
| 1999–2002 | Canon Yaoundé | | |
| 2002 | DPMM FC | | |
| 2003 | Fovu Baham | | |
| 2003–2007 | Beroe Stara Zagora | 57 | (0) |
| 2008–2010 | CSKA Sofia | 15 | (0) |

International career
| 2000 | Cameroon U23 | 3 | (0) |
| 1999 | Cameroon | 1 | (0) |
Medal record
Representing Cameroon
Africa Cup of Nations
| Winner | 2000 Ghana-Nigeria |
Olympics
| Gold medal – first place | 2000 Sydney |
- * Club domestic league appearances and goals

Daniel N'Dene Bekono (born 31 May 1978) is a Cameroonian former professional footballer who played as a goalkeeper.

== Club career ==
In 1999, Bekono played for Canon Yaoundé before joining Fovu Baham in 2003 after a brief stint in Brunei.

In 2003, he moved to Bulgarian side PFC Beroe Stara Zagora. After five years in Beroe he moved to PFC CSKA Sofia, where he was considered a regular in the starting 11 before the arrival of Ivaylo Petrov in the winter of 2009. In 2006, while part of the Beroe squad, he became the first black player to captain a team in the A PFG. Daniel then (after leaving CSKA Sofia) worked as a woodcutter with his cousin in Vienna, Austria.

== International career ==
Bekono was part of the victorious Cameroon national teams at the 2000 African Nations Cup and 2000 Summer Olympics.

== Personal life ==
Bekono has Bulgarian citizenship.

== Honours ==
CSKA Sofia

- Bulgarian First League: 2008
- Bulgarian Supercup: 2008

Canon Yaounde

- Elite One: 2002
- Cameroonian Cup: 1999

Brunei DPMM FC

- Visit Brunei Invitational Cup: 2002

Cameroon

- African Cup of Nations: 2000

Cameroon U-23

- Olympic Gold Medal: 2000
