= Patrice Abanda =

Cameroonian footballer

Personal information
- Full name: Patrice Abanda Etong
- Date of birth: 3 August 1978 (age 48)
- Place of birth: Yaoundé, Cameroon
- Height: 1.88 m (6 ft 2 in)
- Position: Defender

Senior career*
Years	Team	Apps	(Gls)
1995–1998	Tonnerre Yaoundé	0	(0)
1998–1999	PAOK	0	(0)
1999–2000	Apollon Kalamarias	0	(0)
2000–2004	Sparta Prague	11	(0)
2001–2003	Sparta Prague B	45	(0)
2004–2005	FK Drnovice	12	(0)
2005–2006	Teplice	10	(0)
2006–2007	Besa Kavajë	29	(0)
Total		97	(0)

International career
1995–2004	Cameroon	9	(1)
Medal record
Representing Cameroon
Men's Football
Gold medal – first place	2000 Sydney	Team competition
- * Club domestic league appearances and goals

Jouan Patrice Abanda Etong (born 3 August 1978) is a Cameroonian former professional footballer who played as a central defender.

He played for Apollon Kalamarias in Greece and Sparta Prague in the Czech Republic.

He played for Cameroon and participated at the 1998 FIFA World Cup, and the 2000 Summer Olympics where Cameroon won the gold medal.
