= Modeste M'bami =

Cameroonian footballer (1982–2023)

Modeste Mbami
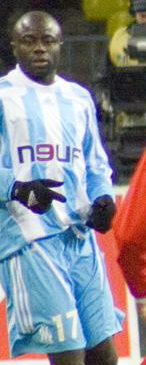
- Mbami playing for Marseille

Personal information
- Date of birth: 9 October 1982
- Place of birth: Yaoundé, Cameroon
- Date of death: 7 January 2023 (aged 40)
- Place of death: Le Havre, France
- Height: 1.72 m (5 ft 8 in)
- Position: Midfielder

Youth career
- 1999–2000: Dynamo Douala

Senior career*
Years	Team	Apps	(Gls)
2000–2003	Sedan	68	(0)
2003–2006	Paris Saint-Germain	83	(1)
2006–2009	Marseille	77	(1)
2009–2011	Almería	58	(1)
2011–2012	Dalian Aerbin	0	(0)
2011	→ Changchun Yatai (loan)	15	(3)
2012–2013	Al-Ittihad	20	(0)
2014	Millonarios	14	(0)
2014–2016	Le Havre	8	(0)
Total		343	(6)

International career
2000–2009	Cameroon	37	(3)
Medal record
Men's football
Representing Cameroon
Africa Cup of Nations
Runner-up	2008 Ghana
FIFA Confederations Cup
Runner-up	2003 France
Olympics
Gold medal – first place	2000 Sydney
- * Club domestic league appearances and goals

Modeste Mbami (9 October 1982 – 7 January 2023) was a Cameroonian professional footballer who played as a midfielder. Mbami played for clubs in France, Saudi Arabia, and Cameroon, most notably Paris Saint-Germain and Marseille, both of which in Ligue 1.

== Club career ==
Born in Yaoundé, Mbami started his career in his home country playing for Dynamo Douala but was quickly spotted by foreign clubs.

Mbami joined Sedan during the summer of 2000. Despite his young age, Mbami played ten matches in his first season in Division 1 and helped his club to finish fifth. He rapidly became a team regular and played 60 matches in the two following seasons. In 2003, the club was relegated to Ligue 2 and Mbami decided to sign a five-year contract with Paris Saint-Germain for €5 million after his agent Willie McKay halted advanced discussions with Wolverhampton Wanderers.

During his first season with Paris Saint-Germain, Mbami was associated with another young defensive midfielder, Lorik Cana. Despite their lack of experience, they played a big part in the club's good season, where Paris Saint-Germain finished second in Ligue 1 and won the Coupe de France. The club's 2004–05 season was less successful, in which Mbami bami was struggling with an injury. The 2005–06 season saw Mbami help Paris Saint-Germain to another Coupe de France title, while the club finished 9th in the league.

In August 2006, after three years at Paris Saint-Germain, Mbami was transferred to arch-rivals Marseille, signing a three-year contract, and thus renewing his midfield partnership with Lorik Cana, who had signed for Marseille the season before.

Mbami left Marseille after his contract expired in the summer of 2009 and has since had trials at English Premier League clubs Portsmouth, Bolton Wanderers, Wolverhampton Wanderers and Wigan Athletic. After his contract ended with Marseille he moved on 30 September 2009 for a trial with the Spanish club UD Almería, later Almería completed the purchase of the midfielder, the Cameroon player signed a contract with the Spanish club.

In July 2011, Mbami and Juanito were released by Almería. Then he joined China League One club Dalian Aerbin and was loaned to Chinese Super League side Changchun Yatai immediately. Mbami returned to Dalian Aerbin in 2012. However, he could not play for Dalian Aerbin in the 2012 league season due to the foreign players restricted rule. Mbami transferred to Saudi Premier League side Al-Ittihad in July 2012.

In 2014 he moved to Colombia joining Millonarios, from the capital city Bogotá. Mbami was hired to play as a defensive midfielder and signed a contract for the 2014–15 season.

== International career ==
Mbami won the Olympic football games with his country in 2000 in Sydney, also scoring the golden goal against Brazil during the quarter-finals. He was also in the team when Cameroon reached the finals of the FIFA Confederations Cup in 2003 and was part of the 2004 African Cup of Nations team which finished top of its group in the first round of competition, before failing to secure qualification for the semi-finals.

Mbami was also in the Cameroon national team that failed to qualify for the 2006 FIFA World Cup as it finished second in its qualification group behind the Ivory Coast.

== Personal life ==
Mbami acquired French nationality by naturalization on 26 December 2005.

== Coaching career ==
In November 2019 he turned down a coaching job with the Cameroon national team.

== Death ==
On 7 January 2023, Paris Saint-Germain announced that Mbami had died of a heart attack, at the age of 40.

== Career statistics ==
Scores and results list Cameroon's goal tally first, score column indicates score after each Mbami goal.

List of international goals scored by Modeste Mbami
No.	Date	Venue	Opponent	Score	Result	Competition
1	17 May 2002	Parken Stadium, Copenhagen, Denmark	Denmark		1–2	Friendly
2	29 January 2004	Stade Taïeb El Mhiri, Sfax, Tunisia	Zimbabwe		5–3	2004 African Cup of Nations
3	29 January 2004	Stade Taïeb El Mhiri, Sfax, Tunisia	Zimbabwe		5–3	2004 African Cup of Nations

== Honours ==
Paris Saint-Germain

- Coupe de France: 2004, 2006

Ittihad FC

- Kings Cup (Saudi Arabia): 2013

Cameroon

- African Cup of Nations: runner-up, 2008
- FIFA Confederations Cup: runner up, 2003

Cameroon U-23

- Olympic Gold Medal: 2000
