= Daniel N'Gom Kome =

Cameroonian footballer

Daniel Kome
Personal information
- Full name: Daniel Armand N'Gom Kome
- Date of birth: 19 May 1980 (age 46)
- Place of birth: Bangou, Cameroon
- Height: 1.75 m (5 ft 9 in)
- Position: Midfielder

Youth career
- 1995: Lycée Bandjoun
- 1996: Stade Bandjoun
- 1997–1999: Cotonsport Garoua

Senior career*
Years	Team	Apps	(Gls)
1999–2000	Atlético Madrid B	33	(3)
2000–2001	Levante	7	(0)
2001–2004	Numancia	89	(12)
2004–2005	Getafe	20	(2)
2005–2006	Ciudad Murcia	32	(3)
2006	Mallorca	5	(0)
2007–2008	Valladolid	17	(1)
2008–2011	Tenerife	90	(6)
Total		293	(27)

International career
2000–2009	Cameroon	35	(2)
Medal record
Representing Cameroon
Africa Cup of Nations
Winner	2002 Mali
Olympics
Gold medal – first place	2000 Sydney
- * Club domestic league appearances and goals

Daniel Armand N'Gom Kome (born 19 May 1980) is a Cameroonian former professional footballer who played as a midfielder.

Playing in Spain since 1999 and representing nearly ten clubs during his professional career, he received a passport from that country in August 2006.

Kome played mainly for Numancia and Tenerife, amassing Segunda División totals of 224 matches and 24 goals over nine seasons. He appeared for Cameroon at the 2002 World Cup and three Africa Cup of Nations tournaments.

== Club career ==
Born in Bangou, West Region, Kome moved to Spain in 1999 at the age of 19 and played there for over a decade. His first team was Atlético Madrid B, and he joined Levante UD in the third division after one season.

After representing CD Numancia, Kome made his La Liga debut with another Madrid club, Getafe CF, first appearing 15 minutes in a 3–1 home win against Athletic Bilbao. On 6 February 2005 he scored the game's only goal in a home victory former side Numancia and, after relative playing time, he dropped down to the second level and signed with Ciudad de Murcia.

Kome started the 2006–07 campaign with RCD Mallorca but, after being overlooked, left for Real Valladolid during the January transfer window, on a two-and-a-half-year deal. However, after being sparingly played and although still under contract, he managed to reach a buyout and moved to CD Tenerife on 21 July 2008, on a Bosman transfer.

On 13 June 2009, Kome scored the game's only goal at Girona FC as his team confirmed their return to the top tier after seven years. He featured regularly for the Canarians in the following two years, but they suffered consecutive relegations.

== International career ==
A Cameroon international since 2000, Kome was also part of the nation's winning team at that year's Summer Olympic Games. At full level, he appeared twice at the 2002 FIFA World Cup and played four matches for the 2002 Africa Cup of Nations winners in Egypt.

Kome was also selected for the 2004 and 2006 editions: in the latter, he scored in the epic 11–12 penalty shootout quarter-final loss against Ivory Coast.

== Career statistics ==
=== Club ===
Appearances and goals by club, season and competition
Club	Season	League			National cup		Total	
Club	Season	Division	Apps	Goals	Apps	Goals	Apps	Goals
Atlético Madrid B	1999-2000	Segunda División	33	3	—		33	3
Levante	2000-01	Segunda División	7	0	1	0	8	0
Numancia	2001-02	Segunda División	27	1	1	0	28	1
Numancia	2002-03	Segunda División	32	5	2	0	34	5
Numancia	2003-04	Segunda División	30	6	1	0	31	6
Numancia	Total		89	12	4	0	93	12
Getafe	2004-05	La Liga	20	2	3	1	23	3
Ciudad Murcia	2005-06	Segunda División	32	3	—		32	3
Mallorca	2006-07	La Liga	5	0	2	0	7	0
Valladolid	2006-07	Segunda División	2	0	1	0	3	0
Valladolid	2007-08	La Liga	15	1	4	0	19	1
Valladolid	Total		17	1	5	0	22	1
Tenerife	2008-09	Segunda División	36	6	—		36	6
Tenerife	2009-10	La Liga	29	0	—		29	0
Tenerife	2010-11	Segunda División	25	0	1	0	26	0
Tenerife	Total		90	6	1	0	91	6
Career total			293	27	16	1	309	28

=== International ===
Appearances and goals by national team and year
National team	Year	Apps	Goals
Cameroon	2000	1	0
Cameroon	2001	3	0
Cameroon	2002	10	0
Cameroon	2003	1	0
Cameroon	2004	2	0
Cameroon	2005	4	0
Cameroon	2006	4	0
Cameroon	2007	3	1
Cameroon	2008	2	1
Cameroon	2009	5	0
Total		35	2

Scores and results list Cameroon's goal tally first, score column indicates score after each Kome goal.

List of international goals scored by Daniel N'Gom Kome
No.	Date	Venue	Opponent	Score	Result	Competition	Ref.
1	7 February 2007	Stade de Kégué, Lomé, Togo	Togo	2–2	2–2	Friendly	
2	19 November 2008	Olympia Park, Rustenburg, South Africa	South Africa	1–2	2–3	Friendly	

== Honours ==
Valladolid

- Segunda División: 2006–07

Cameroon

- African Cup of Nations: 2002

Cameroon U-23

- Olympic Gold Medal: 2000
