= Serge Branco =

Cameroonian footballer

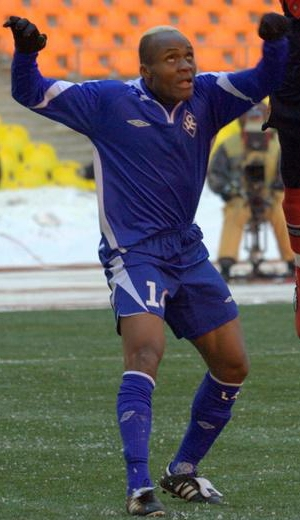
- Serge Branco

Personal information
- Date of birth: 11 October 1980 (age 46)
- Place of birth: Douala, Cameroon
- Height: 1.76 m (5 ft 9 in)
- Positions: Defender; midfielder

Youth career
- Les Brasseries du Cameroon

Senior career*
Years	Team	Apps	(Gls)
1995–1998	Unisport Bafang		
1998–2000	Eintracht Braunschweig	48	(1)
2000–2003	Eintracht Frankfurt	42	(3)
2003–2004	VfB Stuttgart	3	(0)
2004	Leeds United	0	(0)
2004–2005	Queens Park Rangers	7	(0)
2005	Shinnik Yaroslavl	24	(0)
2006–2007	Krylia Sovetov	38	(3)
2008–2009	MSV Duisburg	13	(0)
2009–2010	Levadiakos	18	(0)
2010–2011	Wisła Kraków	4	(0)
2012–2013	Al-Muharraq		
2013–2014	Al Yarmouk		

International career
2000	Cameroon U23	5	(0)
2001	Cameroon	1	(0)
Medal record
Men's football
Representing Cameroon
Olympic Games
Gold medal – first place	2000 Sydney	Team
- * Club domestic league appearances and goals

Serge Branco (born 11 October 1980) is a Cameroonian former professional footballer who played as a defender and as a midfielder.

== Club career ==
Branco was born in Douala. In 1998, he left Cameroon to spend the initial years of his career in Germany. He started out at Regionalliga Nord side Eintracht Braunschweig, where he spent two seasons. After returning from the 2000 Summer Olympics in Sydney, Branco transferred to Bundesliga side Eintracht Frankfurt in October 2000. Frankfurt were relegated to the 2. Bundesliga in 2001, but Branco stayed on for two more seasons at the club before returning to the Bundesliga by signing with VfB Stuttgart in 2003. However, he did not become a regular in Stuttgart, making only three league appearances in 2003–04.

He signed for Leeds United in August 2004, but was released on 13 September for fitness reasons. From 2005 to 2007 he played in the Russian league, before returning to Germany for a stint with MSV Duisburg.

== International career ==
Branco represented the victorious Cameroonian national team at the 2000 Summer Olympics. He was capped once for the Cameroonian senior national team, in a World Cup qualification match against Zambia in 2001.

== Honours ==
Wisła Kraków

- Ekstraklasa: 2010–11

Cameroon

- Olympic gold medal: 2000
