= Cameroon Olympic and Sports Committee =

National Olympic Committee

- Country: Cameroon
- Code: CMR
- Created: 1963
- Recognized: 1963
- Continental Association: ANOCA
- Headquarters: Yaoundé, Cameroon
- President: Hamad Kalkaba Malboum
- Secretary General: David Ojong
- Website: www.cnosc.org

The Cameroon Olympic and Sports Committee (French: Comité National Olympique et Sportif du Cameroun, abbreviated as CNOSC) is a non-profit organization serving as the National Olympic Committee of Cameroon and a part of the International Olympic Committee. It is also the body responsible for Cameroon's representation at the Commonwealth Games.

== History ==
The Cameroon Olympic and Sports Committee was created on the 17 October 1963, during the International Olympic Committee meeting held in Baden in the Federal Republic of Germany.

== List of presidents ==
The following is a list of presidents of the CNOSC:

| President | Term |
|---|---|
| Ernest Wanko | 1963–1972 |
| René Essomba | 1972–1998 |
| Hamad Kalkaba Malboum | 1998–2026 |

== Member federations ==
The Cameroonian National Federations are the organizations that coordinate all aspects of their individual sports. They are responsible for training, competition and development of their sports. There are currently 20 Olympic Summer and eight Non-Olympic Sports Federations in Cameroon.

=== Olympic Sport federations ===
| National Federation | Summer or Winter | Headquarters |
|---|---|---|
| Cameroon Archery Federation | Summer | Yaoundé |
| Cameroon Athletics Federation | Summer | Yaoundé |
| Cameroon Badminton Federation | Summer | Yaoundé |
| Cameroon Basketball Federation | Summer | Yaoundé |
| Cameroon Boxing Federation | Summer | Yaoundé |
| Cameroon Canoe Federation | Summer | Yaoundé |
| Cameroon Cycling Federation | Summer | Yaoundé |
| Cameroon Fencing Federation | Summer | Yaoundé |
| Cameroonian Football Federation | Summer | Yaoundé |
| Cameroon Golf Federation | Summer | Yaoundé |
| Cameroon Handball Federation | Summer | Yaoundé |
| Cameroon Judo Federation | Summer | Yaoundé |
| Cameroon Karate Federation | Summer | Yaoundé |
| Cameroon Roller Sports Federation | Summer | Yaoundé |
| Cameroonian Rugby Federation | Summer | Yaoundé |
| Cameroon Swimming and Life Saving Federation | Summer | Yaoundé |
| Cameroon Table Tennis Federation | Summer | Yaoundé |
| Cameroon Taekwondo Federation | Summer | Yaoundé |
| Cameroon Table Tennis Federation | Summer | Yaoundé |
| Cameroon Volleyball Federation | Summer | Yaoundé |

=== Non-Olympic Sport federations ===
| National Federation | Headquarters |
|---|---|
| Cameroon Cricket Association | Yaoundé |
| Cameroon Draughts Federation | Yaoundé |
| Cameroon Federation of Kobudo and Kendo | Yaoundé |
| Cameroonian Federation Sport for All | Yaoundé |
| Cameroonian Federation for University Sports | Yaoundé |
| Cameroon Karting Federation | Yaoundé |
| Cameroon Kickboxing Federation | Yaoundé |
| Cameroon Wushu Kung Fu Federation | Yaoundé |

== See also ==
- Cameroon at the Olympics
- Cameroon at the Commonwealth Games
