= Football at the 2000 Summer Olympics – Men's team squads =

This article pertains to the team squads of Men's Football at the 2000 Summer Olympics.

Normally, the squads consisted of 18 roster players, with the addition of three or four reserve players. These players were added to the squad in accordance with FIFA regulations (i.e. player injury).

Group A:

- Australia
- Honduras
- Italy
- Nigeria

Group B:

- Chile
- Morocco
- Spain
- South Korea

Group C:

- Cameroon
- Czech Republic
- Kuwait
- United States

Group D:

- Brazil
- Japan
- Slovakia
- South Africa

Overage players are marked with *.

== Group A ==
=== Australia ===
Head coach: (Argentina) Raúl Blanco

No.	Pos.	Player	Date of birth (age)	Caps	Club
1	GK	Danny Milosevic	26 June 1978 (aged 22)		(England) Leeds United
2	DF	Simon Colosimo	8 January 1979 (aged 21)		(Australia) Carlton
3	MF	Stan Lazaridis*	16 August 1972 (aged 28)		(England) Birmingham City
4	DF	Hayden Foxe	23 June 1977 (aged 23)		(England) West Ham United
5	MF	Josip Skoko*	10 December 1975 (aged 24)		(Belgium) Racing Genk
6	DF	Stephen Laybutt	3 September 1977 (aged 23)		(Netherlands) Feyenoord Rotterdam
7	MF	Brett Emerton	22 February 1979 (aged 21)		(Netherlands) Feyenoord Rotterdam
8	DF	Lucas Neill	9 March 1978 (aged 22)		(England) Millwall
9	FW	Mark Viduka*	9 October 1975 (aged 24)		(England) Leeds United
10	MF	Kasey Wehrman	16 August 1977 (aged 23)		(Australia) Perth Glory
11	FW	Clayton Zane	12 July 1977 (aged 23)		(Norway) Molde
12	DF	Con Blatsis	6 July 1977 (aged 23)		(England) Derby County
13	MF	Vince Grella	5 October 1979 (aged 20)		(Italy) Ternana
14	MF	Nick Rizzo	9 June 1979 (aged 21)		(Italy) Ternana
15	MF	Mark Bresciano	11 February 1980 (aged 20)		(Italy) Empoli
16	MF	Jason Culina	5 August 1980 (aged 20)		(Netherlands) Ajax
17	FW	Michael Curcija	27 June 1977 (aged 23)		(Serbia and Montenegro) Partizan
18	GK	Michael Turnbull	14 October 1981 (aged 18)		(Australia) Marconi Stallions

No.	Pos.	Player	Date of birth (age)	Caps	Club: Stand-by players
19	DF	Dragi Nastevski	26 January 1977 (aged 23)		(Australia) Melbourne Knights
20	DF	Buddy Farah	18 August 1978 (aged 22)		(Australia) Marconi Stallions
21	FW	Archie Thompson	23 October 1978 (aged 21)		(Australia) Carlton
22	GK	Tynan Scope	24 March 1981 (aged 19)		(Australia) Marconi Stallions

=== Honduras ===
Head coach: (Honduras) Ramón Maradiaga

No.	Pos.	Player	Date of birth (age)	Caps	Club
1	GK	Carlos Escobar	27 February 1978 (aged 22)		(Honduras) Victoria
2	DF	Iván Guerrero	30 November 1977 (aged 22)		(Honduras) Motagua
3	DF	Elmer Montoya	8 December 1977 (aged 22)		(Honduras) Motagua
4	DF	Júnior Izaguirre	12 August 1979 (aged 21)		(Honduras) Motagua
5	DF	Walter López	1 September 1977 (aged 23)		(Austria) BSV Bad Bleiberg
6	FW	Carlos Paez	28 July 1979 (aged 21)		(Honduras) Olimpia
7	MF	Francisco Pavón	28 January 1977 (aged 23)		(Austria) BSV Bad Bleiberg
8	DF	Jaime Rosales	8 June 1978 (aged 22)		(Honduras) Marathón
9	FW	David Suazo	5 November 1979 (aged 20)		(Italy) Cagliari
10	MF	Julio de León	13 September 1979 (aged 21)		(Mexico) Atletico Celaya
11	FW	Jairo Martínez	14 May 1978 (aged 22)		(Honduras) Motagua
12	MF	Maynor Suazo	10 August 1979 (aged 21)		Austria Salzburg
13	FW	Elvis Scott	10 February 1978 (aged 22)		(Honduras) Platense
14	FW	Luis Ramírez	21 November 1977 (aged 22)		(Honduras) Real España
15	MF	Julio Suazo	5 October 1978 (aged 21)		Austria Salzburg
16	MF	Danilo Turcios	8 May 1978 (aged 22)		(Honduras) UNAH
17	MF	Mario Chirinos	29 July 1978 (aged 22)		(Honduras) Motagua
18	GK	Noel Valladares	3 May 1977 (aged 23)		(Honduras) Motagua

- Stand-by players

No.	Pos.	Player	Date of birth (age)	Caps	Club
19	MF	Carlos Salinas	20 September 1978 (aged 21)		(Honduras) Motagua
20	DF	Héctor Gutiérrez	8 February 1980 (aged 20)		(Honduras) Real España
21	GK	José Rivera	5 February 1977 (aged 23)		(Honduras) Olimpia

=== Italy ===
Head coach: Marco Tardelli

No.	Pos.	Player	Date of birth (age)	Caps	Club
1	GK	Morgan De Sanctis	26 March 1977 (aged 23)		(Italy) Udinese
2	DF	Alessandro Grandoni	22 July 1977 (aged 23)		(Italy) Sampdoria
3	DF	Luca Mezzano	1 August 1977 (aged 23)		(Italy) Hellas Verona
4	DF	Marco Zanchi	15 April 1977 (aged 23)		(Italy) Juventus
5	DF	Matteo Ferrari	5 December 1979 (aged 20)		(Italy) Internazionale
6	MF	Gennaro Gattuso	9 January 1978 (aged 22)		(Italy) Milan
7	FW	Gianni Comandini	18 May 1977 (aged 23)		(Italy) Milan
8	MF	Roberto Baronio	11 December 1977 (aged 22)		(Italy) Lazio
9	FW	Nicola Ventola	24 May 1978 (aged 22)		(Italy) Internazionale
10	MF	Andrea Pirlo	19 May 1979 (aged 21)		(Italy) Internazionale
11	MF	Gianluca Zambrotta	19 February 1977 (aged 23)		(Italy) Juventus
12	FW	Massimo Margiotta	27 July 1977 (aged 23)		(Italy) Udinese
13	MF	Massimo Ambrosini	29 May 1977 (aged 23)		(Italy) Milan
14	DF	Claudio Rivalta	30 June 1978 (aged 22)		(Italy) Perugia
15	DF	Bruno Cirillo	21 March 1977 (aged 23)		(Italy) Internazionale
16	MF	Ighli Vannucchi	5 August 1977 (aged 23)		(Italy) Salernitana
17	MF	Cristiano Zanetti	10 April 1977 (aged 23)		(Italy) Roma
18	GK	Christian Abbiati	8 July 1977 (aged 23)		(Italy) Milan
21	MF	Fabio Firmani	26 May 1978 (aged 22)		(Italy) Vicenza

- Stand-by players

No.	Pos.	Player	Date of birth (age)	Caps	Club
19	MF	Gennaro Scarlato	3 May 1977 (aged 23)		(Italy) Ravenna
20	MF	Stefano Morrone	26 October 1978 (aged 21)		(Italy) Piacenza
22	GK	Cristiano Lupatelli	21 June 1978 (aged 22)		(Italy) Roma

=== Nigeria ===
Head coach: (Netherlands) Jo Bonfrere

No.	Pos.	Player	Date of birth (age)	Caps	Club
1	GK	Greg Etafia	30 September 1982 (aged 17)		(Nigeria) Lobi Stars
2	DF	Gbenga Okunowo	1 March 1979 (aged 21)		(Spain) Barcelona
3	DF	Celestine Babayaro	29 August 1978 (aged 22)		(England) Chelsea
4	FW	Johnson Sunday	10 January 1981 (aged 19)		(Nigeria) Kwara United
5	DF	Iyenemi Furo	17 July 1978 (aged 22)		(Belgium) Royal Antwerp
6	DF	Christopher Kanu	4 December 1979 (aged 20)		(Netherlands) Ajax
7	FW	Victor Agali	29 December 1978 (aged 21)		(Germany) Hansa Rostock
8	FW	Bright Igbinadolor	16 December 1980 (aged 19)		(Spain) Sporting Gijón
9	FW	Yakubu	22 November 1982 (aged 17)		(Israel) Maccabi Haifa
10	MF	Azubike Oliseh	18 November 1978 (aged 21)		(Netherlands) Utrecht
11	MF	Garba Lawal*	22 May 1974 (aged 26)		(Netherlands) Roda JC
12	MF	Henry Onwuzuruike	26 December 1979 (aged 20)		(Germany) Greuther Fürth
13	FW	Pius Ikedia	11 July 1980 (aged 20)		(Netherlands) Ajax
14	MF	Blessing Kaku	5 March 1978 (aged 22)		(Belgium) Genk
15	DF	Godwin Okpara*	20 September 1972 (aged 27)		(France) Paris Saint-Germain
16	DF	Isaac Okoronkwo	1 May 1978 (aged 22)		(Ukraine) Shakhtar Donetsk
17	FW	Julius Aghahowa	12 February 1982 (aged 18)		(Tunisia) Espérance
18	GK	Sam Okoye	1 May 1980 (aged 20)		(Nigeria) Enugu Rangers

- Stand-by players

No.	Pos.	Player	Date of birth (age)	Caps	Club
19	DF	Chikelue Iloenyosi	13 October 1980 (aged 19)		(Germany) Tennis Borussia Berlin
20	MF	Henry Isaac	14 February 1980 (aged 20)		(Germany) Eintracht Frankfurt
22	GK	Ettah Ijoh	14 November 1978 (aged 21)		(Egypt) Al-Mahala

== Group B ==
=== Chile ===
Head coach: (Uruguay) Nelson Acosta

No.	Pos.	Player	Date of birth (age)	Caps	Club
1	GK	Nelson Tapia*	22 September 1966 (aged 33)		(Chile) Universidad Católica
2	DF	Cristián Álvarez	20 January 1980 (aged 20)		(Chile) Universidad Católica
3	DF	Claudio Maldonado	3 January 1980 (aged 20)		(Brazil) São Paulo
4	DF	David Henríquez	12 July 1977 (aged 23)		(Chile) Colo-Colo
5	DF	Pablo Contreras	11 September 1978 (aged 22)		(France) Monaco
6	DF	Pedro Reyes*	13 November 1972 (aged 27)		(France) Auxerre
7	FW	Sebastián González	14 December 1978 (aged 21)		(Chile) Colo-Colo
8	MF	David Pizarro	11 September 1979 (aged 21)		(Italy) Udinese
9	FW	Iván Zamorano*	18 January 1967 (aged 33)		(Italy) Internazionale
10	MF	Francisco Arrué	7 August 1977 (aged 23)		(Chile) Santiago Morning
11	FW	Reinaldo Navia	10 May 1978 (aged 22)		(Chile) Santiago Wanderers
12*	FW	Héctor Tapia	30 September 1977 (aged 22)		(Italy) Perugia
13	MF	Rodrigo Núñez	5 February 1977 (aged 23)		(Chile) Santiago Wanderers
14	DF	Rodrigo Tello	14 October 1979 (aged 20)		Universidad de Chile
15	DF	Manuel Ibarra	18 November 1977 (aged 22)		(Chile) Santiago Morning
16	DF	Rafael Olarra	26 May 1978 (aged 22)		Universidad de Chile
17	MF	Patricio Ormazábal	12 February 1979 (aged 21)		(Chile) Universidad Católica
18	GK	Javier di Gregorio	23 January 1977 (aged 23)		(Chile) Coquimbo Unido
19	DF	Mauricio Rojas	30 March 1978 (aged 22)		(Chile) Santiago Wanderers

Héctor Tapia was replaced and did not receive a medal.

- Stand-by players

No.	Pos.	Player	Date of birth (age)	Caps	Club
20	DF	Andrés Oroz	2 August 1980 (aged 20)		(Chile) Santiago Morning
21	MF	Milovan Mirošević	20 June 1980 (aged 20)		(Chile) Universidad Católica
22	GK	Johnny Herrera	9 May 1981 (aged 19)		Universidad de Chile

=== Morocco ===
Head coach: Said El-Khider

No.	Pos.	Player	Date of birth (age)	Caps	Club
1	GK	Tarik El Jarmouni	30 December 1977 (aged 22)		(Morocco) SCCM de Mohammédia
2	MF	Hamid Nater	30 December 1980 (aged 19)		(Morocco) Raja Casablanca
3	DF	Akram Roumani	1 April 1978 (aged 22)		(Belgium) Genk
4	DF	El Houssaine Ouchla*	1 December 1970 (aged 29)		(Morocco) FAR Rabat
5	MF	Adel Chbouki*	3 May 1971 (aged 29)		(Morocco) Wydad Casablanca
6	DF	Fouzi El Brazi	22 May 1977 (aged 23)		(Netherlands) Twente
7	DF	Mohamed Kharbouch	22 January 1977 (aged 23)		(Morocco) Raja Casablanca
8	MF	Abdelmajid Oulmers	12 September 1978 (aged 22)		(France) ES Wasquehal
9	FW	Jaouad Zairi	17 April 1982 (aged 18)		(France) Gueugnon
10	MF	Otmane El Assas	30 January 1979 (aged 21)		(Morocco) OC Khouribga
11	FW	Bouchaib El Moubarki	12 January 1978 (aged 22)		(Morocco) Raja Casablanca
12	FW	Abdelfattah El Khattari	3 March 1977 (aged 23)		(Morocco) SCCM de Mohammédia
13	DF	Noureddine Kacemi	17 October 1977 (aged 22)		(Morocco) SCCM de Mohammédia
14	FW	Salaheddine Bassir*	5 September 1972 (aged 28)		(Spain) Deportivo La Coruña
15	MF	Youssef Safri	13 January 1977 (aged 23)		(Morocco) Raja Casablanca
16	FW	Karim Benkouar	25 November 1979 (aged 20)		(France) Nîmes
17	MF	Zakaria Aboub	3 June 1980 (aged 20)		(Morocco) Raja Casablanca
18	GK	Abdelilah Bagui	1 January 1978 (aged 22)		(Morocco) MAS Fes
20	MF	Aissam Barroudi	10 May 1978 (aged 22)		(Morocco) MAS Fes

- Stand-by players

No.	Pos.	Player	Date of birth (age)	Caps	Club
19	MF	Abdeslam Ouaddou	1 November 1978 (aged 21)		(France) Nancy
21	FW	Bouchaib El Battachi	14 September 1978 (aged 21)		(Morocco) OC Khouribga
22	GK	Hicham Laaraj	20 November 1978 (aged 21)		(Morocco) TAS Casablanca

=== Spain ===
Head coach: Iñaki Sáez

No.	Pos.	Player	Date of birth (age)	Caps	Club
1	GK	Daniel Aranzubia	18 September 1979 (aged 20)		(Spain) Athletic Bilbao
2	DF	Jesús Lacruz	25 April 1978 (aged 22)		(Spain) Athletic Bilbao
3	DF	Joan Capdevila	3 February 1978 (aged 22)		(Spain) Deportivo La Coruña
4	DF	Carlos Marchena	21 July 1979 (aged 21)		(Spain) Sevilla
5	DF	Unai Vergara	20 January 1977 (aged 23)		(Spain) Villarreal
6	MF	David Albelda	1 September 1977 (aged 23)		(Spain) Valencia
7	FW	Miguel Ángel Angulo	23 June 1977 (aged 23)		(Spain) Valencia
8	MF	Xavi	25 January 1980 (aged 20)		(Spain) Barcelona
9	FW	José Mari	10 December 1978 (aged 21)		(Italy) Milan
10	MF	Gabri	10 February 1979 (aged 21)		(Spain) Barcelona
11	MF	Jordi Ferrón	19 August 1978 (aged 22)		(Spain) Zaragoza
12	DF	Carles Puyol	13 April 1978 (aged 22)		(Spain) Barcelona
13	FW	Albert Luque	11 March 1978 (aged 22)		(Spain) Mallorca
14	DF	Iván Amaya	3 September 1978 (aged 21)		(Spain) Atlético Madrid
15	MF	Ismael	7 February 1977 (aged 23)		(Spain) Racing Santander
16	MF	Toni Velamazán	22 January 1977 (aged 23)		(Spain) Espanyol
17	FW	Raúl Tamudo	19 October 1977 (aged 22)		(Spain) Espanyol
18	GK	Felip Ortiz	27 April 1977 (aged 23)		(Spain) Extremadura

- Stand-by players

No.	Pos.	Player	Date of birth (age)	Caps	Club
19	DF	Javier Dorado	17 December 1977 (aged 22)		(Spain) Real Madrid
20	MF	Iván Ania	24 October 1977 (aged 22)		(Spain) Real Oviedo
21	MF	Jesuli	24 January 1978 (aged 22)		(Spain) Celta Vigo
22	GK	César Láinez	10 April 1977 (aged 23)		(Spain) Real Zaragoza

=== South Korea ===
Head coach: (South Korea) Huh Jung-moo

No.	Pos.	Player	Date of birth (age)	Caps	Club
1	GK	Choi Hyun	7 November 1978 (aged 21)		(South Korea) Chungang University
2	MF	Park Ji-sung	25 February 1981 (aged 19)		(Japan) Kyoto Purple Sanga
3	DF	Park Jae-hong	10 November 1978 (aged 21)		(South Korea) Myongji University
4	DF	Park Jin-sub	11 March 1977 (aged 23)		(South Korea) Sangmu FC
5	DF	Sim Jae-Won	11 March 1977 (aged 23)		(South Korea) Busan I'Cons
6	MF	Kim Do-kyun	13 January 1977 (aged 23)		(South Korea) Ulsan Hyundai Horangi
7	FW	Choi Chul-Woo	30 November 1977 (aged 22)		(South Korea) Ulsan Hyundai Horangi
8	MF	Ko Jong-soo	30 October 1978 (aged 21)		(South Korea) Suwon Samsung Bluewings
9	FW	Kim Do-hoon*	21 July 1970 (aged 30)		(South Korea) Jeonbuk Hyundai Motors
10	FW	Lee Chun-Soo	9 July 1981 (aged 19)		(South Korea) Korea University
11	FW	Lee Dong-gook	29 April 1979 (aged 21)		(South Korea) Pohang Steelers
12	MF	Lee Young-pyo	23 April 1977 (aged 23)		(South Korea) Anyang LG Cheetahs
13	DF	Park Dong-hyuk	18 April 1979 (aged 21)		(South Korea) Korea University
14	DF	Kang Chul*	2 November 1971 (aged 28)		(South Korea) Bucheon SK
15	DF	Cho Se-Kwon	26 June 1978 (aged 22)		(South Korea) Korea University
16	MF	Kim Sang-Sik	17 December 1976 (aged 23)		(South Korea) Seongnam Ilhwa Chunma
17	MF	Choi Tae-Uk	13 March 1981 (aged 19)		(South Korea) Anyang LG Cheetahs
18	GK	Kim Yong-dae	11 October 1979 (aged 20)		(South Korea) Yonsei University
19	MF	Song Chong-Gug	20 February 1979 (aged 21)		(South Korea) Yonsei University

- Stand-by players

No.	Pos.	Player	Date of birth (age)	Caps	Club
20	FW	Kim Gil-Sik	24 August 1978 (aged 22)		(South Korea) Dankook University
21	GK	Lee Woon-jae*	26 April 1973 (aged 27)		(South Korea) Sangmu FC
22	MF	Park Kang-Jo	24 January 1980 (aged 20)		(South Korea) Seongnam Ilhwa Chunma

== Group C ==
=== Cameroon ===
Head Coach: Jean-Paul Akono

No.	Pos.	Player	Date of birth (age)	Caps	Club
1	GK	Daniel Bekono	31 May 1978 (aged 22)		(Cameroon) Canon Yaounde
2	FW	Albert Meyong	19 October 1980 (aged 19)		(Portugal) Vitória de Setúbal
3	DF	Pierre Womé	26 March 1979 (aged 21)		(Italy) Bologna
4	DF	Serge Mimpo*	6 February 1974 (aged 26)		(Greece) Panachaiki
5	DF	Patrice Abanda	3 August 1978 (aged 22)		(Greece) Aris
6	MF	Clément Beaud	7 December 1980 (aged 19)		(Cameroon) Tonnerre Yaoundé
7	MF	Nicolas Alnoudji	9 December 1979 (aged 20)		(Cameroon) Tonnerre Yaoundé
8	DF	Geremi	20 December 1978 (aged 21)		(Spain) Real Madrid
9	FW	Samuel Eto'o	10 March 1981 (aged 19)		(Spain) Mallorca
10	FW	Patrick M'Boma*	15 November 1970 (aged 29)		(Italy) Parma
11	MF	Daniel Kome	19 May 1980 (aged 20)		(Spain) Levante
12	DF	Lauren	19 January 1977 (aged 23)		(England) Arsenal
13	DF	Aaron Nguimbat	13 March 1978 (aged 22)		(Cameroon) Canon Yaoundé
14	FW	Patrick Suffo	17 January 1978 (aged 22)		(England) Sheffield United
15	MF	Joël Epalle	20 February 1978 (aged 22)		(Greece) Ethnikos Piraeus
16	MF	Modeste M'bami	9 October 1982 (aged 17)		(France) Sedan
17	DF	Serge Branco	11 October 1980 (aged 19)		(Germany) Eintracht Braunschweig
18	GK	Carlos Kameni	18 February 1984 (aged 16)		(France) Le Havre

- Stand-by players

No.	Pos.	Player	Date of birth (age)	Caps	Club
20	MF	Georges Mbida Messi	8 December 1980 (aged 19)		(Cameroon) Canon Yaoundé

=== Czech Republic ===
Head coach: Karel Brückner

No.	Pos.	Player	Date of birth (age)	Caps	Club
1	GK	Aleš Chvalovský	29 May 1979 (aged 21)		(Germany) VfB Stuttgart
2	DF	Lukáš Došek	12 September 1978 (aged 22)		(Czech Republic) Slavia Prague
3	DF	Adam Petrouš	19 September 1977 (aged 22)		(Czech Republic) Slavia Prague
4	MF	Radoslav Kováč	27 November 1979 (aged 20)		(Czech Republic) Sigma Olomouc
5	DF	Roman Lengyel	3 November 1978 (aged 21)		(Czech Republic) Sparta Prague
6	MF	Roman Týce	7 May 1977 (aged 23)		(Germany) 1860 Munich
7	FW	Libor Sionko	1 February 1977 (aged 23)		(Czech Republic) Sparta Prague
8	DF	Tomáš Ujfaluši	24 March 1978 (aged 22)		(Czech Republic) Sigma Olomouc
9	DF	Marek Jankulovski	9 May 1977 (aged 23)		(Italy) Napoli
10	FW	Tomáš Kučera	13 February 1977 (aged 23)		(Czech Republic) Marila Příbram
11	FW	Milan Baroš	28 October 1981 (aged 18)		(Czech Republic) Baník Ostrava
12	MF	Jan Polák	14 March 1981 (aged 19)		(Czech Republic) 1. FC Brno
13	DF	Erich Brabec	24 February 1977 (aged 23)		(Czech Republic) Drnovice
14	FW	Libor Došek	24 April 1978 (aged 22)		(Czech Republic) 1. FC Brno
15	MF	Martin Vozábal	8 November 1978 (aged 21)		(Czech Republic) České Budějovice
16	MF	Jan Šimák	13 October 1978 (aged 21)		(Germany) Hannover 96
17	FW	Marek Heinz	4 August 1977 (aged 23)		(Germany) Hamburger SV
18	GK	Jaroslav Drobný	18 October 1979 (aged 20)		(Czech Republic) České Budějovice

- Stand-by players

No.	Pos.	Player	Date of birth (age)	Caps	Club
19	MF	Marcel Lička	17 July 1977 (aged 23)		(Czech Republic) Baník Ostrava
20	FW	Luděk Stracený	19 April 1977 (aged 23)		(Czech Republic) Viktoria Žižkov
21	MF	Martin Čupr	17 October 1977 (aged 22)		(Czech Republic) Viktoria Žižkov
22	GK	Petr Čech	20 May 1982 (aged 18)		(Czech Republic) Chmel Blšany

=== Kuwait ===
Head coach: (Federal Republic of Yugoslavia) Radojko Avramović

No.	Pos.	Player	Date of birth (age)	Caps	Club
1	GK	Shehab Kankune	28 April 1981 (aged 19)		(Kuwait) Kazma
2	MF	Naser Al-Omran	3 March 1977 (aged 23)		(Kuwait) Kazma
3	DF	Jamal Mubarak*	21 March 1974 (aged 26)		(Kuwait) Al Tadamon
4	MF	Bader Najem	20 August 1980 (aged 20)		(Kuwait) Al Qadisiya
5	DF	Abdullah Husan	13 December 1977 (aged 22)		(Kuwait) Al Nasr
6	MF	Nawaf Al Humaidan	8 March 1981 (aged 19)		(Kuwait) Kazma
7	MF	Adel Al-Anezi	6 February 1977 (aged 23)		Al Kuwait
8	FW	Naser Al-Othman	14 January 1977 (aged 23)		(Kuwait) Al Salmiya
9	FW	Bashar Abdullah	12 October 1977 (aged 22)		(Kuwait) Al Salmiya
10	FW	Faraj Laheeb	3 October 1978 (aged 21)		Al Kuwait
11	DF	Abdullah Wabran*	7 February 1971 (aged 29)		(Kuwait) Al Tadamon
12	DF	Hamad Al Tayyar	10 February 1982 (aged 18)		(Kuwait) Kazma
13	DF	Sadoun Salman	28 August 1977 (aged 23)		(Kuwait) Al Qadisiya
14	FW	Khalaf Al-Salamah	25 July 1979 (aged 21)		(Kuwait) Al Jahra
15	MF	Saleh Al-Beraiky	27 February 1977 (aged 23)		(Kuwait) Al Salmiya
16	MF	Yousef Zayed	2 September 1979 (aged 21)		(Kuwait) Fehayheel
17	MF	Esam Sakeen*	2 July 1971 (aged 29)		(Kuwait) Kazma
18	GK	Nawaf Al Khaldi	25 May 1981 (aged 19)		(Kuwait) Khaitan

- Stand-by players

No.	Pos.	Player	Date of birth (age)	Caps	Club
19	DF	Mansour Al-Ajmi	11 May 1979 (aged 21)		(Kuwait) Al Shabab
20	MF	Khaled Zadah	9 June 1980 (aged 20)		(Kuwait) Al Arabi
21	MF	Husain Khodari*	7 February 1972 (aged 28)		(Kuwait) Al Salmiya
22	GK	Saleh Mehdi	9 July 1981 (aged 19)		(Kuwait) Al Salmiya

=== United States ===
Head coach: (England) Clive Charles

No.	Pos.	Player	Date of birth (age)	Caps	Club
1	GK	Brad Friedel*	18 May 1971 (aged 29)		(England) Liverpool
2	DF	Brian Dunseth	2 March 1977 (aged 23)		(United States) New England Revolution
3	DF	Chad McCarty	5 October 1977 (aged 22)		(United States) Tampa Bay Mutiny
4	DF	Jeff Agoos*	2 May 1968 (aged 32)		(United States) D.C. United
5	MF	John O'Brien	29 August 1977 (aged 23)		(Netherlands) Ajax
6	DF	Frankie Hejduk*	5 August 1974 (aged 26)		(Germany) Bayer Leverkusen
7	MF	Joey DiGiamarino	6 April 1977 (aged 23)		(United States) Colorado Rapids
8	DF	Danny Califf	17 March 1980 (aged 20)		(United States) LA Galaxy
9	MF	Ben Olsen	3 May 1977 (aged 23)		(United States) D.C. United
10	MF	Peter Vagenas	6 February 1978 (aged 22)		(United States) LA Galaxy
11	FW	Chris Albright	14 January 1979 (aged 21)		(United States) D.C. United
12	DF	Ramiro Corrales	12 March 1977 (aged 23)		(United States) MetroStars
13	FW	Landon Donovan	4 March 1982 (aged 18)		(Germany) Bayer Leverkusen
14	MF	Sasha Victorine	3 February 1978 (aged 22)		(United States) LA Galaxy
15	DF	Evan Whitfield	23 June 1977 (aged 23)		(United States) Chicago Fire
16	FW	Josh Wolff	25 February 1977 (aged 23)		(United States) Chicago Fire
17	FW	Conor Casey	25 July 1981 (aged 19)		(United States) University of Portland
18	GK	Tim Howard	6 March 1979 (aged 21)		(United States) MetroStars

- Stand-by players

No.	Pos.	Player	Date of birth (age)	Caps	Club
19	MF	Brian Winters	31 December 1977 (aged 22)		(United States) Minnesota Thunder
20	FW	Chris Brown	10 March 1977 (aged 23)		(United States) Kansas City Wizards
21	MF	DaMarcus Beasley	24 May 1982 (aged 18)		(United States) Chicago Fire
22	GK	Matt Napoleon	18 August 1977 (aged 23)		(United States) Columbus Crew

== Group D ==
=== Brazil ===
Head coach: Vanderlei Luxemburgo

No.	Pos.	Player	Date of birth (age)	Caps	Club
1	GK	Helton	18 May 1978 (aged 22)		(Brazil) Vasco da Gama
2	DF	Baiano	28 June 1978 (aged 22)		(Brazil) Santos
3	DF	Fábio Bilica	4 January 1979 (aged 21)		(Italy) Venezia
4	DF	Álvaro	1 November 1977 (aged 22)		(Brazil) São Paulo
5	MF	Marcos Paulo	11 May 1977 (aged 23)		(Brazil) Cruzeiro
6	DF	Fábio Aurélio	24 September 1979 (aged 20)		(Brazil) São Paulo
7	FW	Ronaldinho	21 March 1980 (aged 20)		(Brazil) Grêmio
8	MF	Fabiano	6 April 1978 (aged 22)		(Brazil) São Paulo
9	FW	Edu	10 January 1979 (aged 21)		(Brazil) São Paulo
10	MF	Alex	14 September 1977 (aged 22)		(Italy) Parma
11	FW	Geovanni	11 January 1980 (aged 20)		(Brazil) Cruzeiro
12	MF	Roger	17 August 1978 (aged 22)		(Brazil) Fluminense
13	DF	André Luís	31 July 1979 (aged 21)		(Brazil) Santos
14	DF	Lúcio	8 May 1978 (aged 22)		(Brazil) Internacional
15	MF	Mozart	8 November 1979 (aged 20)		(Brazil) Flamengo
16	DF	Athirson	16 January 1977 (aged 23)		(Brazil) Flamengo
17	FW	Lucas	3 January 1979 (aged 21)		(France) Rennes
18	GK	Fábio Costa	27 November 1977 (aged 22)		(Brazil) Santos

- Stand-by players

No.	Pos.	Player	Date of birth (age)	Caps	Club
19	DF	Flávio	12 March 1980 (aged 20)		(Brazil) Fluminense
20	MF	Alexandre	19 February 1979 (aged 21)		(Brazil) São Paulo
21	FW	Leandro	6 August 1977 (aged 23)		(Italy) Fiorentina
22	GK	Júlio César	3 September 1979 (aged 21)		(Brazil) Flamengo

=== Japan ===
Head coach: (France) Philippe Troussier

No.	Pos.	Player	Date of birth (age)	Caps	Club
1	GK	Seigo Narazaki*	15 April 1976 (aged 24)		(Japan) Nagoya Grampus Eight
2	DF	Yuji Nakazawa	25 February 1978 (aged 22)		(Japan) Verdy Kawasaki
3	DF	Naoki Matsuda	14 March 1977 (aged 23)		(Japan) Yokohama F. Marinos
4	DF	Ryuzo Morioka*	7 October 1975 (aged 24)		(Japan) Shimizu S-Pulse
5	DF	Tsuneyasu Miyamoto	7 February 1977 (aged 23)		(Japan) Gamba Osaka
6	MF	Junichi Inamoto	18 September 1979 (aged 20)		(Japan) Gamba Osaka
7	MF	Hidetoshi Nakata	22 January 1977 (aged 23)		(Italy) Roma
8	MF	Tomakazu Myojin	24 January 1978 (aged 22)		(Japan) Kashiwa Reysol
9	FW	Tomoyuki Hirase	23 May 1977 (aged 23)		(Japan) Kashima Antlers
10	MF	Shunsuke Nakamura	24 June 1978 (aged 22)		(Japan) Yokohama F. Marinos
11	MF	Atsuhiro Miura*	24 July 1974 (aged 26)		(Japan) Yokohama F. Marinos
12	MF	Tomoyuki Sakai	29 June 1979 (aged 21)		(Japan) JEF United Ichihara Chiba
13	FW	Atsushi Yanagisawa	27 May 1977 (aged 23)		(Japan) Kashima Antlers
14	MF	Masashi Motoyama	20 June 1979 (aged 21)		(Japan) Kashima Antlers
15	MF	Norihiro Nishi	9 May 1980 (aged 20)		(Japan) Júbilo Iwata
16	DF	Koji Nakata	9 July 1979 (aged 21)		(Japan) Kashima Antlers
17	FW	Naohiro Takahara	4 June 1979 (aged 21)		(Japan) Júbilo Iwata
18	GK	Ryota Tsuzuki	18 April 1978 (aged 22)		(Japan) Gamba Osaka

- Stand-by players

No.	Pos.	Player	Date of birth (age)	Caps	Club
19	FW	Kota Yoshihara	2 February 1978 (aged 22)		(Japan) Gamba Osaka
20	DF	Satoshi Yamaguchi	17 April 1978 (aged 22)		(Japan) JEF United Ichihara Chiba
21	MF	Yasuhito Endo	28 January 1980 (aged 20)		(Japan) Kyoto Purple Sanga
22	GK	Hitoshi Sogahata	2 August 1979 (aged 21)		(Japan) Kashima Antlers

=== Slovakia ===
Head coach: Dušan Radolský

No.	Pos.	Player	Date of birth (age)	Caps	Club
1	GK	Kamil Čontofalský	3 June 1978 (aged 22)		(Czech Republic) Bohemians Prague
2	DF	Marián Čišovský	2 November 1979 (aged 20)		(Slovakia) Inter Bratislava
3	MF	Miroslav Drobňák	29 May 1977 (aged 23)		(Slovakia) Tatran Prešov
4	MF	Peter Hlinka	5 December 1978 (aged 21)		(Slovakia) Tatran Prešov
5	DF	Peter Lérant	30 January 1977 (aged 23)		(Germany) Bayer Leverkusen
6	DF	Miloš Krško	23 October 1979 (aged 20)		(Slovakia) Ozeta Dukla Trenčín
7	MF	Karol Kisel	15 March 1977 (aged 23)		(Czech Republic) Bohemians Prague
8	MF	Michal Pančík*	17 December 1971 (aged 28)		(Slovakia) Slovan Bratislava
9	MF	Juraj Czinege	29 October 1977 (aged 22)		(Slovakia) Inter Bratislava
10	MF	Miroslav Barčík	26 May 1978 (aged 22)		(Slovakia) Žilina
11	FW	Ján Šlahor	16 May 1977 (aged 23)		(Slovakia) Slovan Bratislava
12	DF	Martin Petráš	2 November 1979 (aged 20)		(Czech Republic) Jablonec
13	MF	Martin Vyskoč	10 June 1977 (aged 23)		(Slovakia) Ružomberok
14	DF	Andrej Šupka	22 January 1979 (aged 21)		(Slovakia) Dubnica
15	MF	Marek Mintál	2 September 1977 (aged 23)		(Slovakia) Žilina
16	DF	Radoslav Kráľ*	20 February 1974 (aged 26)		(Slovakia) Košice
17	FW	Andrej Porázik	27 June 1977 (aged 23)		(Slovakia) Ozeta Dukla Trenčín
18	GK	Martin Lipčák*	22 December 1975 (aged 24)		(Slovakia) Ozeta Dukla Trenčín
21	GK	Ján Mucha	20 June 1978 (aged 22)		(Slovakia) Nitra

- Stand-by players

No.	Pos.	Player	Date of birth (age)	Caps	Club
19	FW	Tomáš Oravec	3 July 1980 (aged 20)		(Slovakia) Ružomberok
20	DF	Vratislav Greško	24 July 1977 (aged 23)		(Germany) Bayer Leverkusen

=== South Africa ===
Head Coach: Ephraim Mashaba

No.	Pos.	Player	Date of birth (age)	Caps	Club
1	GK	Emile Baron	17 June 1979 (aged 21)		(Norway) Lillestrøm
2	DF	Fabian McCarthy	13 May 1977 (aged 23)		(Cyprus) Apollon FC Limassol
3	DF	David Kannemeyer	8 July 1977 (aged 23)		(South Africa) Ajax Cape Town
4	DF	Nkhiphitheni Matombo	31 January 1977 (aged 23)		(South Africa) Manning Rangers
5	DF	Matthew Booth	14 March 1977 (aged 23)		(South Africa) Mamelodi Sundowns
6	MF	Quinton Fortune	21 May 1977 (aged 23)		(England) Manchester United
7	MF	Stanton Fredericks	13 June 1977 (aged 23)		(South Africa) Wits University
8	FW	Daniel Matsau	18 January 1977 (aged 23)		(South Africa) Kaizer Chiefs
9	FW	Toni Nhleko	24 July 1979 (aged 21)		(South Africa) Jomo Cosmos
10	MF	Steve Lekoelea	5 February 1979 (aged 21)		(South Africa) Orlando Pirates
11	MF	Jabu Pule	11 July 1980 (aged 20)		(South Africa) Kaizer Chiefs
12	MF	Dumisa Ngobe*	5 March 1973 (aged 27)		(Turkey) Ankaragücü
13	MF	Abram Nteo	15 July 1977 (aged 23)		(South Africa) Bloemfontein Celtic
14	DF	Aaron Mokoena	25 November 1980 (aged 19)		(Netherlands) Ajax
15	FW	Siyabonga Nomvethe	2 December 1977 (aged 22)		(South Africa) Kaizer Chiefs
16	MF	Delron Buckley	7 December 1977 (aged 22)		(Germany) VfL Bochum
17	FW	Benni McCarthy	12 November 1977 (aged 22)		(Spain) Celta Vigo
18	GK	Brian Baloyi*	16 March 1974 (aged 26)		(South Africa) Kaizer Chiefs

- Stand-by players

No.	Pos.	Player	Date of birth (age)	Caps	Club
19	FW	Lebohang Kukame	4 June 1978 (aged 22)		(South Africa) Bloemfontein Celtic
20	MF	Mzunani Mgwigwi	17 November 1978 (aged 21)		(South Africa) Bush Bucks
21	MF	Patrick Mbuthu	3 February 1977 (aged 23)		(South Africa) Kaizer Chiefs
22	GK	Rowen Fernandez	28 February 1978 (aged 22)		(South Africa) Wits University
