= 2000 UEFA European Under-21 Championship squads =

Football team member listings

Players in bold have later been capped at full international level.

== Group A ==
=== Croatia ===
Head coach: Ivo Šušak

No.	Pos.	Player	Date of birth (age)	Caps	Goals	Club
1	GK	**Stipe Pletikosa**	8 January 1979 (aged 21)			(Croatian Football Federation) Hajduk Split
2	MF	**Darko Miladin**	1 April 1979 (aged 21)			(Croatian Football Federation) Hajduk Split
3	DF	**Anthony Šerić**	15 November 1979 (aged 20)			(Italian Football Federation) Hellas Verona
4	MF	**Igor Bišćan**	4 May 1978 (aged 22)			(Croatian Football Federation) Dinamo Zagreb
5	DF	**Igor Tudor**	16 April 1978 (aged 22)			(Italian Football Federation) Juventus
6	DF	**Dario Smoje**	19 September 1978 (aged 21)			(Italian Football Federation) Monza
7	FW	**Boško Balaban**	15 October 1978 (aged 21)			(Croatian Football Federation) Rijeka
8	MF	**Jurica Vranješ**	31 January 1980 (aged 20)			(German Football Association) Bayer Leverkusen
9	FW	**Tomislav Šokota**	8 April 1977 (aged 23)			(Croatian Football Federation) Dinamo Zagreb
10	MF	**Ivan Leko**	7 February 1978 (aged 22)			(Croatian Football Federation) Hajduk Split
11	FW	**Josip Šimić**	16 September 1977 (aged 22)			(Croatian Football Federation) Dinamo Zagreb
12	GK	Silvije Čavlina	22 April 1977 (aged 23)			(Croatian Football Federation) Hrvatski Dragovoljac
13	DF	Andre Mijatović	3 December 1979 (aged 20)			(Croatian Football Federation) Rijeka
14	MF	**Renato Pilipović**	14 January 1977 (aged 23)			(Croatian Football Federation) Dinamo Zagreb
15	MF	Dalibor Višković	6 January 1977 (aged 23)			(Croatian Football Federation) Rijeka
16	MF	**Goran Brajković**	17 July 1978 (aged 21)			(Croatian Football Federation) Rijeka
17	FW	Mihael Mikić	6 January 1980 (aged 20)			(Croatian Football Federation) Dinamo Zagreb
18	MF	**Silvester Sabolčki**	12 November 1979 (aged 20)			(Croatian Football Federation) Varteks
19	FW	**Ivica Banović**	2 August 1980 (aged 19)			(Croatian Football Federation) NK Zagreb
20	GK	Nikola Marić	29 August 1979 (aged 20)			(Football Association of Bosnia and Herzegovina) Široki Brijeg

=== Czech Republic ===
Head coach: Karel Brückner

No.	Pos.	Player	Date of birth (age)	Caps	Goals	Club
1	GK	**Aleš Chvalovský**	29 May 1979 (aged 20)			(German Football Association) VfB Stuttgart
2	DF	**Lukáš Došek**	12 September 1978 (aged 21)			(Football Association of the Czech Republic) Slavia Prague
3	DF	**Adam Petrouš**	19 September 1977 (aged 22)			(Football Association of the Czech Republic) Slavia Prague
4	DF	**Zdeněk Grygera**	14 May 1980 (aged 20)			(Football Association of the Czech Republic) Drnovice
5	DF	Roman Lengyel	3 November 1978 (aged 21)			(Football Association of the Czech Republic) České Budějovice
6	MF	**Roman Týce**	7 May 1977 (aged 23)			(German Football Association) 1860 Munich
7	MF	**Libor Sionko**	1 February 1977 (aged 23)			(Football Association of the Czech Republic) Sparta Prague
8	MF	**Tomáš Ujfaluši**	24 March 1978 (aged 22)			(Football Association of the Czech Republic) Sigma Olomouc
9	MF	**Marek Jankulovski**	9 May 1977 (aged 23)			(Football Association of the Czech Republic) Baník Ostrava
10	FW	**Tomáš Došek**	12 September 1978 (aged 21)			(Football Association of the Czech Republic) Slavia Prague
11	FW	**Milan Baroš**	28 October 1981 (aged 18)			(Football Association of the Czech Republic) Baník Ostrava
12	MF	**Jan Polák**	14 March 1981 (aged 19)			(Football Association of the Czech Republic) 1. FC Brno
13	DF	**Jiří Jarošík**	27 October 1977 (aged 22)			(Football Association of the Czech Republic) Sparta Prague
14	DF	**Erich Brabec**	24 February 1977 (aged 23)			(Football Association of the Czech Republic) Drnovice
15	MF	**David Jarolím**	17 May 1979 (aged 21)			(German Football Association) Bayern Munich
16	GK	**Jaroslav Drobný**	18 October 1979 (aged 20)			(Football Association of the Czech Republic) České Budějovice
17	FW	Libor Došek	24 April 1978 (aged 22)			(Football Association of the Czech Republic) Chmel Blšany
18	MF	**Jan Šimák**	13 October 1978 (aged 21)			(Football Association of the Czech Republic) Chmel Blšany
19	FW	**Marek Heinz**	4 August 1977 (aged 22)			(Football Association of the Czech Republic) Sigma Olomouc
20	GK	Tomáš Bureš	27 September 1978 (aged 21)			(Football Association of the Czech Republic) Sigma Olomouc

=== Netherlands ===
Head coach: Han Berger

No.	Pos.	Player	Date of birth (age)	Caps	Goals	Club
1	GK	Mark Zegers	8 February 1977 (aged 23)			(Royal Dutch Football Association) Excelsior
2	MF	**Mark van Bommel**	22 April 1977 (aged 23)			(Royal Dutch Football Association) PSV
3	DF	Pascal Bosschaart	28 February 1980 (aged 20)			(Royal Dutch Football Association) Utrecht
4	DF	**Wilfred Bouma**	15 June 1978 (aged 21)			(Royal Dutch Football Association) PSV
5	MF	Ellery Cairo	3 August 1978 (aged 21)			(Royal Dutch Football Association) Feyenoord
6	DF	Tim Cornelisse	3 April 1978 (aged 22)			(Royal Dutch Football Association) RKC Waalwijk
7	DF	Joost Broerse	8 May 1978 (aged 22)			(Royal Dutch Football Association) Groningen
8	MF	John de Jong	8 March 1977 (aged 23)			(Royal Dutch Football Association) Utrecht
9	MF	Richard Knopper	29 August 1977 (aged 22)			(Royal Dutch Football Association) Ajax
10	MF	**Dirk Kuyt**	22 July 1980 (aged 19)			(Royal Dutch Football Association) Utrecht
11	MF	Tommie van der Leegte	27 March 1977 (aged 23)			(Royal Dutch Football Association) RKC Waalwijk
12	FW	Anthony Lurling	22 April 1977 (aged 23)			(Royal Dutch Football Association) Heerenveen
13	MF	Kiki Musampa	20 July 1977 (aged 22)			(Royal Spanish Football Federation) Málaga
14	DF	John Nieuwenburg	24 December 1978 (aged 21)			(Royal Dutch Football Association) Ajax
15	DF	**Niels Oude Kamphuis**	14 November 1977 (aged 22)			(German Football Association) Schalke 04
16	GK	Cees Paauwe	3 November 1977 (aged 22)			(Royal Dutch Football Association) Twente
17	DF	Humphrey Rudge	15 August 1977 (aged 22)			(Royal Dutch Football Association) Roda JC
18	MF	**Victor Sikora**	11 April 1978 (aged 22)			(Royal Dutch Football Association) Vitesse
19	FW	**Jan Vennegoor of Hesselink**	7 November 1978 (aged 21)			(Royal Dutch Football Association) Twente
20	DF	**Peter Wisgerhof**	19 November 1979 (aged 20)			(Royal Dutch Football Association) Vitesse

=== Spain ===
Head coach: Iñaki Sáez

No.	Pos.	Player	Date of birth (age)	Caps	Goals	Club
1	GK	**Daniel Aranzubia**	18 September 1979 (aged 20)	4	0	(Royal Spanish Football Federation) Athletic Bilbao
2	DF	Jesús Lacruz	25 April 1978 (aged 22)	6	0	(Royal Spanish Football Federation) Athletic Bilbao
3	DF	**Joan Capdevila**	3 February 1978 (aged 22)	10	0	(Royal Spanish Football Federation) Atlético Madrid
4	DF	Iván Amaya	3 September 1978 (aged 21)	0	0	(Royal Spanish Football Federation) Rayo Vallecano
5	MF	**Carlos Marchena**	31 July 1979 (aged 20)	3	0	(Royal Spanish Football Federation) Sevilla
6	MF	Ismael Ruiz	7 July 1977 (aged 22)	10	0	(Royal Spanish Football Federation) Racing Santander
7	MF	**Miguel Ángel Angulo**	23 June 1977 (aged 22)	12	2	(Royal Spanish Football Federation) Valencia
8	DF	**Gabri**	10 February 1979 (aged 21)	5	0	(Royal Spanish Football Federation) Barcelona
9	FW	**José Mari**	12 October 1978 (aged 21)	9	5	(Italian Football Federation) Milan
10	MF	**Xavi**	25 January 1980 (aged 20)	11	4	(Royal Spanish Football Federation) Barcelona
11	MF	**Javier Farinós**	29 March 1978 (aged 22)	11	3	(Royal Spanish Football Federation) Valencia
12	DF	**Carles Puyol**	13 April 1978 (aged 22)	1	0	(Royal Spanish Football Federation) Barcelona
13	GK	César Láinez	10 April 1977 (aged 23)	0	0	(Royal Spanish Football Federation) Zaragoza
14	DF	Javier Dorado	17 February 1977 (aged 23)	2	0	(Royal Spanish Football Federation) Real Madrid
15	MF	**David Albelda**	1 September 1977 (aged 22)	8	1	(Royal Spanish Football Federation) Valencia
16	FW	**Raúl Tamudo**	19 October 1977 (aged 22)	8	5	(Royal Spanish Football Federation) Espanyol
17	MF	Toni Velamazán	22 January 1977 (aged 23)	14	0	(Royal Spanish Football Federation) Espanyol
18	MF	Jordi Ferrón	15 September 1978 (aged 21)	1	1	(Royal Spanish Football Federation) Rayo Vallecano
19	FW	**Albert Luque**	11 March 1978 (aged 22)	9	2	(Royal Spanish Football Federation) Mallorca
20	MF	Iván Ania	24 October 1977 (aged 22)	5	1	(Royal Spanish Football Federation) Oviedo
21	GK	Felip Ortiz	27 April 1977 (aged 23)	6	0	(Royal Spanish Football Federation) Extremadura

== Group B ==
=== England ===
Head coach: Howard Wilkinson

No.	Pos.	Player	Date of birth (age)	Caps	Goals	Club
1	GK	Nicky Weaver	2 March 1979 (aged 21)	10	0	(The Football Association) Manchester City
2	DF	**Danny Mills**	18 May 1977 (aged 23)	14	3	(The Football Association) Leeds United
3	DF	**Seth Johnson**	12 March 1979 (aged 21)	0	0	(The Football Association) Derby County
4	DF	**Luke Young**	19 July 1979 (aged 20)	17	1	(The Football Association) Tottenham Hotspur
5	DF	**Jamie Carragher**	28 January 1978 (aged 22)	27	1	(The Football Association) Liverpool
6	DF	**Anthony Gardner**	19 September 1980 (aged 19)	0	0	(The Football Association) Tottenham Hotspur
7	MF	**Frank Lampard**	20 June 1978 (aged 21)	16	8	(The Football Association) West Ham United
8	FW	Matt Jansen	20 October 1977 (aged 22)	6	0	(The Football Association) Blackburn Rovers
9	FW	**Carl Cort**	1 December 1977 (aged 22)	12	8	(The Football Association) Wimbledon
10	MF	**Danny Murphy**	18 March 1977 (aged 23)	5	0	(The Football Association) Liverpool
11	MF	**Lee Hendrie**	18 May 1977 (aged 23)	12	5	(The Football Association) Aston Villa
12	MF	**Michael Carrick**	28 July 1981 (aged 18)	0	0	(The Football Association) West Ham United
13	GK	**Paul Robinson**	15 October 1979 (aged 20)	14	0	(The Football Association) Leeds United
14	DF	Jon Harley	26 September 1979 (aged 20)	3	0	(The Football Association) Wimbledon
15	MF	David Thompson	12 September 1977 (aged 22)	7	1	(The Football Association) Liverpool
16	FW	**Francis Jeffers**	25 January 1981 (aged 19)	16	13	(The Football Association) Everton
17	MF	Luke Chadwick	18 November 1980 (aged 19)	13	0	(The Football Association) Manchester United
18	FW	Andy Campbell	18 April 1979 (aged 21)	0	0	(The Football Association) Middlesbrough
19	DF	**Ledley King**	12 October 1980 (aged 19)	9	0	(The Football Association) Tottenham Hotspur
20	MF	**David Dunn**	27 December 1979 (aged 20)	20	3	(The Football Association) Blackburn Rovers

=== Italy ===
Head coach: Marco Tardelli

No.	Pos.	Player	Date of birth (age)	Caps	Goals	Club
1	GK	**Morgan De Sanctis**	26 March 1977 (aged 23)	7	0	(Italian Football Federation) Udinese
2	DF	Alessandro Grandoni (c)	27 July 1977 (aged 22)	19	0	(Italian Football Federation) Torino
3	DF	Luca Mezzano	1 August 1977 (aged 22)	19	1	(Italian Football Federation) Brescia
4	DF	Marco Zanchi	15 April 1977 (aged 23)	1	0	(Italian Football Federation) Udinese
5	DF	**Matteo Ferrari**	5 December 1979 (aged 20)	27	3	(Italian Football Federation) Internazionale
6	MF	**Gennaro Gattuso**	9 January 1978 (aged 22)	21	1	(Italian Football Federation) Milan
7	FW	Gianni Comandini	18 May 1977 (aged 23)	19	6	(Italian Football Federation) Vicenza
8	MF	**Roberto Baronio**	11 December 1977 (aged 22)	27	5	(Italian Football Federation) Lazio
9	FW	Nicola Ventola	24 May 1978 (aged 22)	21	8	(Italian Football Federation) Internazionale
10	MF	**Andrea Pirlo**	19 May 1979 (aged 21)	46	16	(Italian Football Federation) Internazionale
11	MF	**Simone Perrotta**	17 September 1977 (aged 22)	6	1	(Italian Football Federation) Bari
12	GK	**Christian Abbiati**	8 July 1977 (aged 22)	16	0	(Italian Football Federation) Milan
13	DF	**Francesco Coco**	8 January 1977 (aged 23)	20	1	(Italian Football Federation) Milan
14	DF	Claudio Rivalta	30 June 1978 (aged 21)	16	0	(Italian Football Federation) Perugia
15	DF	Bruno Cirillo	21 March 1977 (aged 23)	11	0	(Italian Football Federation) Reggina
16	MF	Ighli Vannucchi	5 August 1977 (aged 22)	16	2	(Italian Football Federation) Salernitana
17	MF	**Cristiano Zanetti**	14 April 1977 (aged 23)	19	0	(Italian Football Federation) Roma
18	MF	Fabio Firmani	26 May 1978 (aged 22)	10	1	(Italian Football Federation) Vicenza
19	MF	Marco Rossi	1 April 1978 (aged 22)	6	0	(Italian Football Federation) Salernitana
20	FW	Gionatha Spinesi	9 March 1978 (aged 22)	8	5	(Italian Football Federation) Bari

=== Slovakia ===
Head coach: Dušan Radolský

No.	Pos.	Player	Date of birth (age)	Caps	Goals	Club
1	GK	**Kamil Čontofalský**	3 June 1978 (aged 21)			(Football Association of the Czech Republic) Bohemians
2	DF	**Marián Čišovský**	2 November 1979 (aged 20)			(Slovak Football Association) Inter Bratislava
3	DF	**Vratislav Greško**	24 July 1977 (aged 22)			(German Football Association) Bayer Leverkusen
4	MF	**Miroslav Barčík**	26 May 1978 (aged 22)			(Slovak Football Association) Žilina
5	DF	**Eduard Hrnčár**	8 July 1978 (aged 21)			(Slovak Football Association) Nitra
6	DF	**Radoslav Zabavník**	16 September 1980 (aged 19)			(Slovak Football Association) 1. FC Košice
7	MF	**Juraj Czinege**	29 October 1977 (aged 22)			(Slovak Football Association) Inter Bratislava
8	FW	**Peter Babnič**	30 April 1977 (aged 23)			(Slovak Football Association) Inter Bratislava
9	FW	**Marek Mintál**	2 September 1977 (aged 22)			(Slovak Football Association) Žilina
10	MF	**Miroslav Drobňák**	29 May 1977 (aged 22)			(Slovak Football Association) Tatran Prešov
11	FW	**Szilárd Németh**	8 August 1977 (aged 22)			(Slovak Football Association) Inter Bratislava
12	GK	Ján Mucha	20 June 1978 (aged 21)			(Slovak Football Association) Nitra
13	MF	**Karol Kisel**	15 March 1977 (aged 23)			(Slovak Football Association) Trenčín
14	DF	Peter Lérant	30 January 1977 (aged 23)			(German Football Association) Bayer Leverkusen
15	FW	**Ľubomír Meszároš**	23 March 1979 (aged 21)			(Slovak Football Association) Slovan Bratislava
16	MF	**Peter Hlinka**	5 December 1978 (aged 21)			(Slovak Football Association) Tatran Prešov
17	MF	**Pavol Sedlak**	21 November 1979 (aged 20)			(Slovak Football Association) Slovan Bratislava
18	DF	**Martin Petráš**	2 November 1979 (aged 20)			(Slovak Football Association) Baník Horná Nitra
19	DF	Andrej Šupka	22 January 1977 (aged 23)			(Slovak Football Association) Dubnica
20	FW	Martin Vyskoč	10 June 1977 (aged 22)			(Slovak Football Association) Ružomberok

=== Turkey ===
Head coach: Raşit Çetiner

No.	Pos.	Player	Date of birth (age)	Caps	Goals	Club
1	GK	**Metin Aktaş**	1 August 1977 (aged 22)			(Turkish Football Federation) Trabzonspor
2	DF	**Ali Güneş**	23 November 1978 (aged 21)			(German Football Association) SC Freiburg
3	DF	İsmail Güldüren	10 January 1979 (aged 21)			(Turkish Football Federation) Gençlerbirliği
4	DF	Güngör Öztürk	22 December 1977 (aged 22)			(Turkish Football Federation) Samsunspor
5	DF	**Erkan Özbey**	10 February 1978 (aged 22)			(Turkish Football Federation) Bursaspor
6	MF	Yasin Sülün	17 December 1977 (aged 22)			(Turkish Football Federation) Beşiktaş
7	FW	**Nihat Kahveci**	23 November 1979 (aged 20)			(Turkish Football Federation) Beşiktaş
8	MF	Serkan Dökme	18 July 1977 (aged 22)			(Turkish Football Federation) Altay
9	FW	**Ahmet Dursun**	25 January 1978 (aged 22)			(Turkish Football Federation) Beşiktaş
10	MF	**Yıldıray Baştürk**	24 December 1978 (aged 21)			(German Football Association) VfL Bochum
11	MF	Erhan Albayrak	5 April 1977 (aged 23)			(Turkish Football Federation) Gaziantepspor
12	GK	Süleyman Küçük	13 February 1978 (aged 22)			(Turkish Football Federation) Denizlispor
13	MF	Bülent Akın	28 August 1978 (aged 21)			(Turkish Football Federation) Denizlispor
14	MF	Halit Köprülü	20 January 1978 (aged 22)			(Turkish Football Federation) Gaziantepspor
15	FW	Soner Uysal	24 August 1977 (aged 22)			(German Football Association) Hamburger SV
16	MF	Engin Öztonga	10 August 1978 (aged 21)			(Turkish Football Federation) Kocaelispor
17	MF	Mehmet Nas	20 November 1979 (aged 20)			(Turkish Football Federation) Samsunspor
18	DF	**Orhan Ak**	29 September 1979 (aged 20)			(Turkish Football Federation) Kocaelispor
19	FW	**Okan Yılmaz**	16 May 1978 (aged 22)			(Turkish Football Federation) Bursaspor
20	FW	**Serhat Akın**	5 June 1981 (aged 18)			(German Football Association) Karlsruher SC
