= Özbey =

Özbey is a Turkish surname. "Öz" means "pure" or "genuine," and "bey" is a title of respect used for a gentleman or a lord. So the name means Genuine Lord. Notable people with the surname include:

- Merve Özbey
- Erkan Özbey (born 1978), Turkish footballer
- Rızvan Özbey
- Tolgay Özbey (born 1986), Australian footballer
