= Sadoun Salman =

Kuwaiti footballer

Personal information
- Date of birth: 28 August 1977 (age 49)

Senior career*
Years	Team	Apps	(Gls)
- Al-Salmiya

International career
- Kuwait
- * Club domestic league appearances and goals

Sadoun Salman (born 28 August 1977) is a Kuwaiti footballer. He competed in the men's tournament at the 2000 Summer Olympics.
