= Abram Nteo =

South African soccer player

Personal information
- Full name: Abram Leukie Nteo
- Date of birth: 15 July 1977 (age 49)
- Place of birth: Odendaalsrus, South Africa
- Height: 1.62 m (5 ft 4 in)
- Position: Midfielder

Senior career*
Years	Team	Apps	(Gls)
–1997	Western Rangers		
1997–2001	Bloemfontein Celtic		
2001–	Hellenic FC		
- AmaZulu
–2007	Bloemfontein Celtic		
2008–2011	African Warriors		

International career
- South Africa U20
- South Africa U23

Managerial career
- 2014: African Warriors (caretaker)
- * Club domestic league appearances and goals

Abram Leukie Nteo (born 15 July 1977) is a South African former soccer player who played as a midfielder.

He played at club level with Bloemfontein Celtic, Hellenic FC, AmaZulu and African Warriors, and was a youth international, playing with South Africa under-20s at the 1997 African Youth Championship and South Africa under-23s at the 2000 Summer Olympics. Since retiring as a player, he has worked as a coach at African Warriors, Royal Eagles, Bloemfontein Celtic, Royal AM and Magesi.

== Club career ==
Nteo was raised in Odendaalsrus, Free State, South Africa. He joined Bloemfontein Celtic from second-tier club Western Rangers in 1997, and made his first-team debut for Celtic in early 1998. He moved to Hellenic FC in summer 2001, and later had a spell with AmaZulu, before returning to Celtic. He was released by Celtic in summer 2007, and in January 2008, he signed for National First Division club African Warriors, where he later became club captain.

== International career ==
He was part of the South Africa under-20 team that reached the final of the 1997 African Youth Championship. He competed in the men's tournament at the 2000 Summer Olympics for South Africa under-23s. He was named in the South Africa's COSAFA Cup squad in April 2001.

== Coaching career ==
He worked as a coach at African Warriors following the end of his playing career, and he was appointed as an assistant coach there in 2014. He became head coach on a caretaker basis in October 2014, but he left African Warriors in December 2014, and took up the role of assistant coach at Royal Eagles. He was appointed as part of an interim coaching team at the end of the 2015–16 season, and was sacked by the club shortly after.

In August 2017, he was appointed as a coach for Bloemfontein Celtic's reserve team. He later became head coach of this team, winning the PSL Reserve League in the 2018–19 season. He was appointed as a first-team assistant coach in July 2020. The club later sold its license and hence its playing and coaching staff to Royal AM in 2021, with Nteo continuting in his role there, and later worked at Magesi F.C. before being let go in summer 2026.
