= Lebohang Kukame =

South African soccer player (born 1978)

Personal information
- Date of birth: 4 June 1978 (age 48)
- Place of birth: Germiston, South Africa
- Height: 1.82 m (6 ft 0 in)
- Position: Centre forward

Senior career*
Years	Team	Apps	(Gls)
1997	Arsenal (Maseru)	22	(6)
1997–1998	Kathlehong City	25	(7)
1998–2001	Bloemfontein Celtic	69	(2)
2001–2003	Jomo Cosmos	15	(3)
2002–2003	SuperSport United	4	(1)
2003–2004	Manning Rangers	15	(2)
2003–2005	Santos (Cape Town)	18	(0)
2005–2008	Bloemfontein Celtic	39	(7)
2008–2010	Maritzburg United	11	(1)
2010–2011	Roses United		
Total		218+	(29+)

International career
- South Africa U23
2002–2006	South Africa	7	(1)
- * Club domestic league appearances and goals

Lebohang Kukame (born 4 June 1978) is a South African former professional soccer player who played as a centre forward. He was capped seven times by South Africa and scored once. He previously represented South Africa at under-23 level and was a standby player for their 2000 Summer Olympics squad.
