= Chris Matombo =

South African soccer player (born 1993)

Personal information
- Full name: Zwivhuya Chris Matombo
- Date of birth: 6 February 1993 (age 33)
- Place of birth: South Africa
- Position: Midfielder

Team information
- Current team: JDR Stars
- Number: 15

Youth career
- Kaizer Chiefs

Senior career*
Years	Team	Apps	(Gls)
–2016	Kaizer Chiefs	0	(0)
2015–2016	→ Chippa United (loan)	2	(0)
2017–2018	Qormi	22	(4)
2018	Black Leopards	0	(0)
2019	TTM		
2019	Qormi	11	(1)
2020	Swieqi United	5	(1)
2021	Senglea Athletic	4	(0)
2021–2022	Venda	9	(0)
2022–	JDR Stars	52	(0)
- * Club domestic league appearances and goals as of 19:51, 21 July 2024 (UTC)

Zwivhuya Chris Matombo (born 26 September 1993) is a South African professional soccer player who plays as a midfielder for JDR Stars.

== Career ==
Matombo started his career with South African top flight side Kaizer Chiefs. In 2015, he signed for Chippa United in South Africa, but left due to disciplinary problems. In 2017, Matombo signed for Maltese second tier club Qormi after receiving interest from Lokeren in the Belgian top flight. In 2018, he signed for Black Leopards in the South African top flight. Before the second half of 2018–19, he signed for South African second tier team TTM.

In 2019, Matombo returned to Qormi in the Maltese second tier. Before the second half of 2020–21, he signed for Maltese top flight outfit Senglea Athletic. In 2021, he signed for Venda in the South African second tier. On 2 October 2021, Matombo debuted for Venda during a 1–0 win over Uthongathi.

== Personal life ==
He is the younger brother of fellow footballer Nkhiphitheni Matombo.
