= Nkhiphitheni Matombo =

South African footballer

Personal information
- Full name: Nkhiphitheni Matombo
- Date of birth: 31 January 1977 (age 49)
- Place of birth: Thohoyandou, South Africa
- Height: 1.74 m (5 ft 9 in)
- Position: Midfielder

Senior career*
Years	Team	Apps	(Gls)
- Dynamos
- Manning Rangers
- Black Leopards
- Durban City

International career
- South Africa U20
- South Africa U23
- * Club domestic league appearances and goals

Nkhiphitheni Matombo (born 31 January 1977) is a South African former soccer player.

== Club career ==
He was born in the village of Muledane, Thulamela Local Municipality, Limpopo. At club level, he played for Dynamos, Manning Rangers, Black Leopards and Durban City. He retired in 2008 after a hamstring injury.

== International career ==
He was part of the South Africa under-20s squad at the 1997 African Youth Championship, having been spotted representing Limpopo province at under-20 level, and was also part of the South Africa squad for the 1997 FIFA World Youth Championship. He competed in the men's tournament at the 2000 Summer Olympics for South Africa under-23s.

== After football ==
Since retiring, Matombo has lived in Thembisa and worked as a drill assistant with crews fixing roads.

== Personal life ==
He is the older brother of fellow footballer Chris Matombo.
