= Johnson Sunday =

Nigerian footballer

Personal information
- Date of birth: 10 January 1981 (age 45)
- Position: Midfielder

Senior career*
Years	Team	Apps	(Gls)
2000–2001	Kwara United		

International career
1999	Nigeria	1	(0)
2000	Nigeria U23	1	(0)
- * Club domestic league appearances and goals

Johnson Sunday (born 10 January 1981) is a Nigerian former international footballer who played as a midfielder.

== Career ==
Sunday played for Kwara United.

He participated at the 2000 Summer Olympics, and earned one senior cap for Nigeria in 1999.
