= Bader Najem =

Kuwaiti footballer

Personal information
- Full name: Bader Najem Al-Shammari
- Date of birth: 20 August 1980 (age 46)
- Place of birth: Kuwait City
- Position: Midfielder

Senior career*
Years	Team	Apps	(Gls)
1997–2000	Al Naser		
2000–2002	Qadsia		
2002–2007	Muharraq		

International career
2000–2002	Kuwait		
2003	Bahrain		
- * Club domestic league appearances and goals

Bader Najem (born 20 August 1980) is a Kuwaiti footballer. He competed in the men's tournament at the 2000 Summer Olympics in Sydney.
