= Tomáš Bureš =

Czech footballer

Personal information
- Date of birth: 27 September 1978 (age 48)
- Place of birth: Prostějov, Czechoslovakia
- Height: 1.87 m (6 ft 1 1/2 in)
- Position: Goalkeeper

Youth career
- 1984–1990: TJ Brodek u Prostějova
- 1990–1995: Železárny Prostějov

Senior career*
Years	Team	Apps	(Gls)
1995–1999	LeRK Prostějov	50	(0)
1999–2001	Sigma Olomouc	28	(0)
2001	FK Drnovice (loan)		
2002–2003	Sigma Olomouc		
2003–2006	FK Drnovice	85	(0)
2006–2011	1.FC Brno	74	(0)
2012–2015	1. SK Prostějov		
- * Club domestic league appearances and goals as of 7 February 2022

Tomáš Bureš (born 27 September 1978, in Prostějov) is a Czech former football goalkeeper.

== Career ==
Bureš started his career with LeRK Prostějov.
