= Andrej Šupka =

Slovak footballer

Personal information
- Date of birth: 22 January 1977 (age 49)
- Place of birth: Trenčín, Czechoslovakia
- Position: Defender

International career
| Years | Team | Apps | (Gls) |
- Slovakia

Andrej Šupka (born 22 January 1977) is a Slovak footballer. He competed in the men's tournament at the 2000 Summer Olympics.
