= Martin Vyskoč =

Slovak footballer

Personal information
- Date of birth: 10 June 1977 (age 49)
- Place of birth: Liptovský Mikuláš, Czechoslovakia

International career
Years	Team	Apps	(Gls)
- Slovakia

Martin Vyskoč (born 10 June 1977) is a Slovak footballer. He finished in fifth place at the international tournament in Veča. He competed in the men's tournament at the 2000 Summer Olympics.
