= Ján Šlahor =

Slovak footballer

Personal information
- Full name: Ján Šlahor
- Date of birth: 16 May 1977 (age 49)
- Place of birth: Czechoslovakia
- Height: 1.79 m (5 ft 10 1/2 in)
- Position: Centre forward

Team information
- Current team: SV Ratzersdorf

Senior career*
Years	Team	Apps	(Gls)
- Devín
2001–2004	Slovan Bratislava	102	(19)
2001–2002	→Prešov (loan)	34	(7)
2004	Lisma-Mordovia Saransk	18	(1)
2005	Vrbové		
2005	Lučenec		
2006–2007	Inter Bratislava		
2008	Senec	9	(0)
2008	UFC Purbach		
2009–2010	SV Leithaprodersdorf		
2011	LP Domino		
2012–	SV Ratzersdorf		

International career^{‡}
2000	Slovakia Olympic	?	(1)
- * Club domestic league appearances and goals as of 23 March 2012 ‡ National team caps and goals as of 23 March 2012

Ján Šlahor (born 16 May 1977) is a professional Slovak footballer that currently plays for Slovak club SV Ratzersdorf. He is an attacker and he wears number 11.

He represented the Slovakia national football team in the 2000 Summer Olympics in Sydney.
