= Bright Igbinadolor =

Nigerian footballer

Personal information
- Full name: Bright Ehigiamusoe Igbinadolor
- Date of birth: 16 December 1980 (age 45)
- Height: 1.80 m (5 ft 11 in)
- Position: Midfielder

Senior career*
Years	Team	Apps	(Gls)
1997	Bendel Insurance		
1997–2001	Sporting de Gijón B		
1999–2000	→ Stade Nyonnais		
2001–2002	Jokerit	43	(3)
2009–	Southern Myanmar United		

International career^{‡}
2000	Nigeria U23	3	(1)
2002	Nigeria	1	(0)
- * Club domestic league appearances and goals as of 24 October 2012 ‡ National team caps and goals as of 24 October 2012

Bright Igbinadolor (born 16 December 1980) is a Nigerian international footballer who plays professionally in Myanmar for Southern Myanmar United, as a midfielder.

== Career ==
Igbinadolor has played professionally in Nigeria, Spain, Switzerland, Finland and Myanmar for Bendel Insurance, Sporting de Gijón B, Stade Nyonnais, Jokerit and Southern Myanmar United.

He participated at the 2000 Summer Olympics, and earned one senior cap for Nigeria in 2002.
