= Erkan Özbey =

Turkish footballer

Personal information
- Full name: Erkan Özbey
- Date of birth: 10 February 1978 (age 48)
- Place of birth: Rize, Turkey
- Height: 1.81 m (5 ft 11 in)
- Position: Defender

Youth career
- Bursa Merinosspor AS
- Bursaspor

Senior career*
Years	Team	Apps	(Gls)
1995–1997	Bursa Merinosspor AS	56	(2)
1996–2003	Bursaspor	145	(3)
1996–1997	→ Bursa Merinosspor AS (loan)	30	(1)
1997–1998	→ Karabükspor (loan)	32	(0)
2003–2009	Gençlerbirliği	126	(2)
2009–2012	Gölbaşıspor		

International career
1998–2000	Turkey U21	19	(0)
2002	Turkey A2	1	(0)
2002	Turkey	1	(0)
- * Club domestic league appearances and goals

Erkan Özbey (born 10 February 1978 in Rize, Turkey) is a Turkish retired football player. He played as a defender.
