= Andrej Porázik =

Slovak footballer

Personal information
- Full name: Andrej Porázik
- Date of birth: 27 June 1977 (age 49)
- Place of birth: Bratislava, Czechoslovakia
- Height: 1.88 m (6 ft 2 in)
- Position: Striker

Senior career*
Years	Team	Apps	(Gls)
1996–1999	Inter Bratislava	33	(6)
1999–2001	Ozeta Dukla Trenčín	38	(9)
2001–2004	ZTS Dubnica	75	(11)
2005–2006	Dyskobolia	23	(3)
2005	→ Obra Kościan (loan)		
2006–2008	MŠK Žilina	55	(18)
2008–2011	MFK Dubnica	66	(7)

International career
2000	Slovakia Olympic	3	(0)
2004	Slovakia	2	(1)
- * Club domestic league appearances and goals

Andrej Porázik (27 June 1977) is a Slovak former professional footballer who played as a striker.

== Honours ==
Žilina

- Slovak Superliga: 2006–07
- Slovak Super Cup: 2007
