= Football at the 2000 Summer Olympics – Men's tournament =

2000 Men's Olympic Football Tournament

Tournament details
- Host country: Australia
- Dates: 13–30 September
- Teams: 16 (from 6 confederations)
- Venues: 6 (in 5 host cities)

Final positions
- Champions: Cameroon (1st title)
- Runners-up: Spain
- Third place: Chile
- Fourth place: United States

Tournament statistics
- Matches played: 32
- Goals scored: 103 (3.22 per match)
- Attendance: 1,034,500 (32,328 per match)
- Top scorer(s): (Chile) Iván Zamorano (6 goals)

The men's football tournament at the 2000 Summer Olympics was held in Sydney and four other cities in Australia from 13 to 30 September. It was the 22nd edition of the men's Olympic football tournament.

The final, played at the Olympic Stadium in Sydney, Australia, attracted the Olympic Games Football attendance record of 104,098 which broke the previous record of 101,799 set at the Rose Bowl for the gold medal match of the 1984 Summer Olympics in Los Angeles. Cameroon won the gold medal with a victory over Spain, the country's first Olympic gold in history.

== Competition schedule ==
The match schedule of the tournament.

Legend
G	Group stage	¼	Quarter-finals	½	Semi-finals	B	Bronze medal match	F	Gold medal match

13 Wed	14 Thu	15 Fri	16 Sat	17 Sun	18 Mon	19 Tue	20 Wed	21 Thu	22 Fri	23 Sat	24 Sun	25 Mon	26 Tue	27 Wed	28 Thu	29 Fri	30 Sat
G	G		G	G		G	G			¼		½				B	F

== Qualification ==
The following 16 teams qualified for the 2000 Olympic men's football tournament:

Means of qualification	Berths	Qualified
Host nation	1	Australia
CAF Preliminary Competition	3	Cameroon; Morocco; Nigeria
AFC Preliminary Competition	3	Kuwait; Japan; South Korea
CONCACAF Preliminary Competition	2	Honduras (winner); United States (runner-up)
2000 CONMEBOL Pre-Olympic Tournament	2	Brazil (winner); Chile (runner-up)
2000 UEFA European Under-21 Football Championship	4	Italy (winner); Czech Republic (runner-up); Spain (third-place); Slovakia (fourth-place)
OFC–CAF play-off	1	South Africa
Total	16	

Four countries competed for the first time in 2000: the Czech Republic and Slovakia (previously champions together as Czechoslovakia at the 1980 Summer Olympics), South Africa and Honduras.

== Venues ==
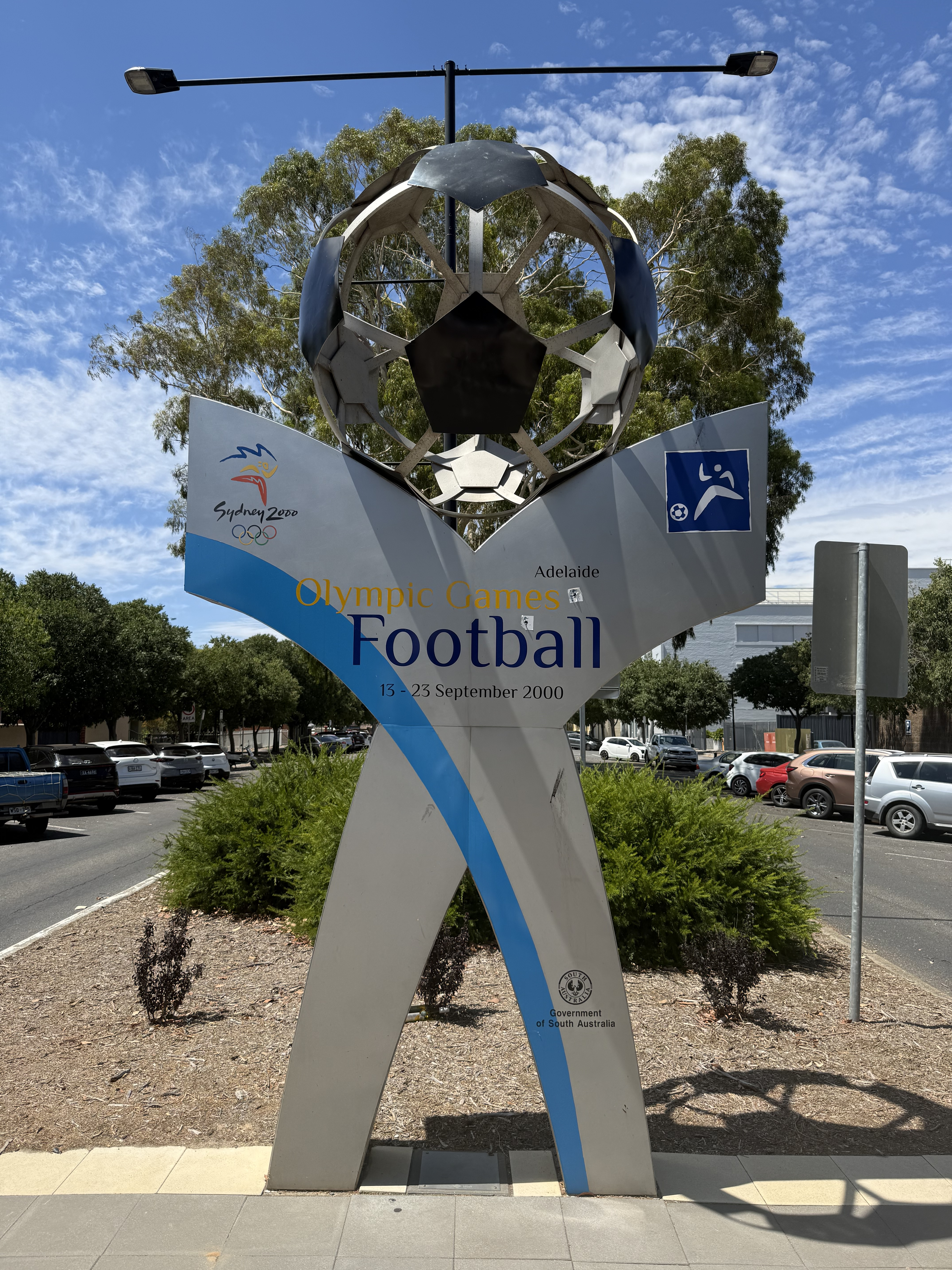
Adelaide Olympic Games Football statue in Hindmarsh, South Australia, commemorating Adelaide hosting football games during the 2000 Sydney Olympics

Six venues were used during the tournament, four of them outside of Sydney at cities around Australia. Olympic stadium hosted the Final.

Sydney		Melbourne
Olympic Stadium	Sydney Football Stadium	Melbourne Cricket Ground
Capacity: 110,000	Capacity: 42,500	Capacity: 98,000
Brisbane	Canberra	Adelaide
Brisbane Cricket Ground	Bruce Stadium	Hindmarsh Stadium
Capacity: 37,000	Capacity: 25,011	Capacity: 20,000
Football at the 2000 Summer Olympics – Men's tournament is located in Australia

== Match officials ==
Africa

- (Tunisia) Mourad Daami
- (Senegal) Falla N'Doye
- (Zimbabwe) Felix Tangawarima

Asia

- (China) Lu Jun
- (Kuwait) Saad Mane

North and Central America

- (Jamaica) Peter Prendergast
- (Mexico) Felipe Ramos

South America

- (Chile) Mario Sánchez Yantén
- (Brazil) Carlos Simon

Europe

- (France) Stéphane Bré
- (Germany) Herbert Fandel
- (Slovakia) Ľuboš Micheľ

Oceania

- (Australia) Simon Micallef
- (New Zealand) Bruce Grimshaw

== Seeding ==
The draw for the tournament took place on 3 June 2000. Australia, South Korea, the United States and Brazil were seeded for the draw and placed into groups A–D, respectively. The remaining teams were drawn from four pots with teams from the same region kept apart.

Pot 1: Host, Top-Seeded teams from Americas and Asia	Pot 2: Europe	Pot 3: Africa	Pot 4: Non-top seeded teams from Americas and Asia
Australia (assigned to A1); South Korea (assigned to B1); United States (assigned to C1); Brazil (assigned to D1)	Czech Republic; Italy; Slovakia; Spain	Cameroon; Morocco; Nigeria; South Africa	Chile; Honduras; Japan; Kuwait

== Group stage ==
=== Group A ===
Team	Pld	W	D	L	GF	GA	GD	Pts
Italy	3	2	1	0	5	2	+3	7
Nigeria	3	1	2	0	7	6	+1	5
Honduras	3	1	1	1	6	7	−1	4
Australia	3	0	0	3	3	6	−3	0

13 September 2000
18:30

Nigeria	3–3	Honduras
Igbinadolor 50'; Agali 78'; Yakubu 90+1'	Report	Suazo 36', 76'; León 60'

Hindmarsh Stadium, Adelaide
Attendance: 13,386
Referee: Ľuboš Micheľ (Slovakia)

13 September 2000
20:00

Australia	0–1	Italy
	Report	Pirlo 81'

Melbourne Cricket Ground, Melbourne
Attendance: 93,252
Referee: Peter Prendergast (Jamaica)

16 September 2000
18:30

Italy	3–1	Honduras
Comandini 12', 22'; Ambrosini 18'	Report	Comandini 29' (o.g.)

Hindmarsh Stadium, Adelaide
Attendance: 18,301
Referee: Lu Jun (China)

16 September 2000
20:00

Australia	2–3	Nigeria
Foxe 41'; Wehrman 44'	Report	Ikedia 16'; Aghahowa 22'; Agali 64'

Sydney Football Stadium, Sydney
Attendance: 38,080
Referee: Carlos Simon (Brazil)

19 September 2000
18:30

Italy	1–1	Nigeria
Okunowo 65' (o.g.)	Report	Lawal 40'

Hindmarsh Stadium, Adelaide
Attendance: 18,340
Referee: Felipe Ramos (Mexico)

19 September 2000
20:00

Australia	1–2	Honduras
Rosales 51' (o.g.)	Report	Suazo 3', 60'

Sydney Football Stadium, Sydney
Attendance: 37,788
Referee: Mourad Daami (Tunisia)

=== Group B ===
Team	Pld	W	D	L	GF	GA	GD	Pts
Chile	3	2	0	1	7	3	+4	6
Spain	3	2	0	1	6	3	+3	6
South Korea	3	2	0	1	2	3	−1	6
Morocco	3	0	0	3	1	7	−6	0

14 September 2000
18:30

South Korea	0–3	Spain
	Report	Velamazán 10'; José Mari 26'; Xavi 37'

Hindmarsh Stadium, Adelaide
Attendance: 14,060
Referee: Felipe Ramos (Mexico)

14 September 2000
20:00

Morocco	1–4	Chile
Ouchla 79'	Report	Zamorano 36', 45+1' (pen.), 55'; Navia 72' (pen.)

Melbourne Cricket Ground, Melbourne
Attendance: 22,654
Referee: Saad Mane (Kuwait)

17 September 2000
18:30

South Korea	1–0	Morocco
Lee Chun-soo 53'	Report

Hindmarsh Stadium, Adelaide
Attendance: 12,753
Referee: Herbert Fandel (Germany)

17 September 2000
20:00

Spain	1–3	Chile
Lacruz 54'	Report	Olarra 24'; Navia 41', 90'

Melbourne Cricket Ground, Melbourne
Attendance: 58,061
Referee: Felix Tangawarima (Zimbabwe)

20 September 2000
18:30

South Korea	1–0	Chile
Lee Dong-gook 28'	Report

Hindmarsh Stadium, Adelaide
Attendance: 16,309
Referee: Ľuboš Micheľ (Slovakia)

20 September 2000
20:00

Spain	2–0	Morocco
José Mari 33'; Gabri 90'	Report

Melbourne Cricket Ground, Melbourne
Attendance: 24,623
Referee: Lu Jun (China)

=== Group C ===
Team	Pld	W	D	L	GF	GA	GD	Pts
United States	3	1	2	0	6	4	+2	5
Cameroon	3	1	2	0	5	4	+1	5
Kuwait	3	1	0	2	6	8	−2	3
Czech Republic	3	0	2	1	5	6	−1	2

13 September 2000
19:00

Cameroon	3–2	Kuwait
Alnoudji 37'; M'Boma 76'; Lauren 86'	Report	Mutairi 63'; Mubarak 88'

Brisbane Cricket Ground, Brisbane
Attendance: 26,730
Referee: Bruce Grimshaw (New Zealand)

13 September 2000
20:00

United States	2–2	Czech Republic
Albright 21'; Wolff 44'	Report	Jankulovski 28'; Došek 52' (pen.)

Bruce Stadium, Canberra
Attendance: 24,800
Referee: Carlos Simon (Brazil)

16 September 2000
19:00

Czech Republic	2–3	Kuwait
Heinz 2'; Lengyel 90+1'	Report	Mutairi 56'; Saeed 64', 73'

Brisbane Cricket Ground, Brisbane
Attendance: 22,182
Referee: Mourad Daami (Tunisia)

16 September 2000
20:00

United States	1–1	Cameroon
Vagenas 64'	Report	M'Boma 16'

Bruce Stadium, Canberra
Attendance: 22,379
Referee: Mario Sánchez Yantén (Chile)

19 September 2000
19:00

Czech Republic	1–1	Cameroon
Došek 74'	Report	Lauren 24'

Brisbane Cricket Ground, Brisbane
Attendance: 23,442
Referee: Simon Micallef (Australia)

19 September 2000
20:00

United States	3–1	Kuwait
Califf 40'; Albright 63'; Donovan 88'	Report	Najem 83'

Melbourne Cricket Ground, Melbourne
Attendance: 19,684
Referee: Herbert Fandel (Germany)

=== Group D ===
Team	Pld	W	D	L	GF	GA	GD	Pts
Brazil	3	2	0	1	5	4	+1	6
Japan	3	2	0	1	4	3	+1	6
South Africa	3	1	0	2	5	5	0	3
Slovakia	3	1	0	2	4	6	−2	3

14 September 2000
19:00

Brazil	3–1	Slovakia
Edu 30'; Čišovský 68' (o.g.); Alex 90+1'	Report	Porázik 26'

Brisbane Cricket Ground, Brisbane
Attendance: 24,616
Referee: Simon Micallef (Australia)

14 September 2000
20:00

South Africa	1–2	Japan
Nomvethe 31'	Report	Takahara 45+1', 79'

Bruce Stadium, Canberra
Attendance: 17,500
Referee: Stéphane Bré (France)

17 September 2000
19:00

Brazil	1–3	South Africa
Edu 11'	Report	Fortune 10'; Nomvethe 74'; Lekoelea 90'

Brisbane Cricket Ground, Brisbane
Attendance: 36,326
Referee: Bruce Grimshaw (New Zealand)

17 September 2000
20:00

Slovakia	1–2	Japan
Porázik 83'	Report	Nakata 67'; Inamoto 74'

Bruce Stadium, Canberra
Attendance: 15,289
Referee: Falla N'Doye (Senegal)

20 September 2000
19:00

Brazil	1–0	Japan
Alex 5'	Report

Brisbane Cricket Ground, Brisbane
Attendance: 36,608
Referee: Stéphane Bré (France)

20 September 2000
20:00

Slovakia	2–1	South Africa
Czinege 64'; Šlahor 72'	Report	McCarthy 75'

Bruce Stadium, Canberra
Attendance: 14,562
Referee: Mario Sánchez Yantén (Chile)

== Knockout stage ==
Note: Extra time periods were played under the golden goal rule.

Quarter-finals
23 September – Adelaide
United States (p)	2 (5)
Japan	2 (4)
23 September – Sydney
Italy	0
Spain	1
23 September – Brisbane
Brazil	1
Cameroon (a.e.t.)	2
23 September – Melbourne
Chile	4
Nigeria	1

Semi-finals
26 September – Sydney
United States	1
Spain	3
26 September – Melbourne
Cameroon	2
Chile	1

Gold medal match
30 September – Sydney Olympic
Spain	2 (3)
Cameroon (p)	2 (5)
Bronze medal match
29 September – Sydney
United States	0
Chile	2

=== Quarter-finals ===
23 September 2000
18:30

United States	2–2 (a.e.t.)	Japan
Wolff 68'; Vagenas 90' (pen.)	Report	Yanagisawa 30'; Takahara 72'
Penalties
Vagenas (penalty scored); Agoos (penalty scored); Donovan (penalty scored); Wolff (penalty scored); Victorine (penalty scored)	5–4	(penalty scored) Nakamura; (penalty scored) Inamoto; (penalty scored) Morioka; (penalty missed) Nakata; (penalty scored) Myojin

Hindmarsh Stadium, Adelaide
Attendance: 18,345
Referee: Felix Tangawarima (Zimbabwe)

23 September 2000
19:00

Brazil	1–2 (a.e.t./g.g.)	Cameroon
Ronaldinho 90+4'	Report	M'Boma 17'; M'Bami 113'

The Gabba, Brisbane
Attendance: 37,332
Referee: Herbert Fandel (Germany)

23 September 2000
20:00

Italy	0–1	Spain
	Report	Gabri 86'

Sydney Football Stadium, Sydney
Attendance: 38,134
Referee: Carlos Simon (Brazil)

23 September 2000
20:00

Chile	4–1	Nigeria
Contreras 17'; Zamorano 18'; Navia 42'; Tello 65'	Report	Agali 76'

Melbourne Cricket Ground, Melbourne
Attendance: 44,425
Referee: Saad Mane (Kuwait)

=== Semi-finals ===
26 September 2000
20:00

Spain	3–1	United States
Tamudo 16'; Angulo 25'; José Mari 87'	Report	Vagenas 42' (pen.)

Sydney Football Stadium, Sydney
Attendance: 39,800
Referee: Mourad Daami (Tunisia)

26 September 2000
21:00

Chile	1–2	Cameroon
Abanda 78' (o.g.)	Report	Mboma 84'; Lauren 89' (pen.)

Melbourne Cricket Ground, Melbourne
Attendance: 64,338
Referee: Stéphane Bré (France)

=== Bronze medal match ===
29 September 2000
20:00

United States	0–2	Chile
	Report	Zamorano 69' (pen.), 84'

Sydney Football Stadium, Sydney
Attendance: 26,381
Referee: Simon Micallef (Australia)

=== Gold medal match ===
30 September 2000
12:00

Spain	2–2 (a.e.t.)	Cameroon
Xavi 2'; Gabri 45+2'	Report 1 Report 2	Amaya 53' (o.g.); Eto'o 58'
Penalties
Xavi (penalty scored); Capdevila (penalty scored); Amaya (penalty missed); Albelda (penalty scored)	3–5	(penalty scored) M'Boma; (penalty scored) Eto'o; (penalty scored) Geremi; (penalty scored) Lauren; (penalty scored) Womé

Olympic Stadium, Sydney
Attendance: 104,098
Referee: Felipe Ramos (Mexico)

Team details

Spain	Cameroon

GK	1	Daniel Aranzubia	(yellow card) 90+1'
CB	12	Carles Puyol
CB	14	Iván Amaya
CB	4	Carlos Marchena
RM	16	Toni Velamazán		(substituted off) 26'
CM	6	David Albelda	(yellow card) 19'
CM	8	Xavi
LM	2	Jesús María Lacruz
AM	7	Miguel Ángel Angulo		(substituted off) 75'
CF	17	Raúl Tamudo		(substituted off) 49'
CF	9	José Mari	(yellow card) 55' (yellow-red card) 90+1'
Substitutes:
MF	10	Gabri	(red card) 70'	(substituted on) 26'
DF	11	Jordi Ferrón		(substituted on) 49'
DF	3	Joan Capdevila		(substituted on) 75'
Manager:
Iñaki Sáez

GK	18	Carlos Kameni
SW	13	Aaron Nguimbat		(substituted off) 46'
CB	5	Patrice Abanda	(yellow card) 25'
CB	4	Serge Mimpo
RWB	12	Lauren
LWB	17	Serge Branco		(substituted off) 91'
DM	7	Nicolas Alnoudji		(substituted off) 111'
RM	8	Geremi
LM	3	Pierre Womé
AM	10	Patrick M'Boma
CF	9	Samuel Eto'o
Substitutes:
MF	11	Daniel Kome		(substituted on) 46'
MF	15	Joël Epalle		(substituted on) 91'
FW	2	Albert Meyong		(substituted on) 111'
Manager:
Jean-Paul Akono

== Final ranking ==
Pos	Team	Pld	W	D	L	GF	GA	GD	Pts
1	Cameroon	6	3	3	0	11	8	+3	12
2	Spain	6	4	1	1	12	6	+6	13
3	Chile	6	4	0	2	14	6	+8	12
4	United States	6	1	3	2	9	11	−2	6
5	Italy	4	2	1	1	5	3	+2	7
6	Japan	4	2	1	1	6	5	+1	7
7	Brazil	4	2	0	2	6	6	0	6
8	Nigeria	4	1	2	1	8	10	−2	5
9	South Korea	3	2	0	1	2	3	−1	6
10	Honduras	3	1	1	1	6	7	−1	4
11	South Africa	3	1	0	2	5	5	0	3
12	Kuwait	3	1	0	2	6	8	−2	3
13	Slovakia	3	1	0	2	4	6	−2	3
14	Czech Republic	3	0	2	1	5	6	−1	2
15	Australia	3	0	0	3	3	6	−3	0
16	Morocco	3	0	0	3	1	7	−6	0

== Statistics ==
=== Goalscorers ===
With six goals, Iván Zamorano of Chile is the top goalscorer in the tournament. In total, 103 goals were scored by 62 different players, with six of them credited as own goals.

6 goals

- (Chile) Iván Zamorano

4 goals

- (Cameroon) Patrick Mboma
- (Chile) Reinaldo Navia
- (Honduras) David Suazo

3 goals

- (Cameroon) Lauren
- (Japan) Naohiro Takahara
- (Nigeria) Victor Agali
- (Spain) Gabri
- (Spain) José Mari
- (United States) Peter Vagenas

2 goals

- (Brazil) Alex
- (Brazil) Edu
- (Czech Republic) Lukáš Došek
- (Italy) Gianni Comandini
- (Kuwait) Khalaf Al-Mutairi
- (Kuwait) Faraj Saeed
- (Slovakia) Andrej Porázik
- (South Africa) Siyabonga Nomvethe
- (Spain) Xavi
- (United States) Chris Albright
- (United States) Josh Wolff

1 goal

- (Australia) Hayden Foxe
- (Australia) Kasey Wehrman
- (Brazil) Ronaldinho
- (Cameroon) Nicolas Alnoudji
- (Cameroon) Samuel Eto'o
- (Cameroon) Modeste M'bami
- (Chile) Pablo Contreras
- (Chile) Rafael Olarra
- (Chile) Rodrigo Tello
- (Czech Republic) Marek Heinz
- (Czech Republic) Roman Lengyel
- (Honduras) Julio César de León
- (Italy) Massimo Ambrosini
- (Italy) Andrea Pirlo
- (Japan) Junichi Inamoto
- (Japan) Hidetoshi Nakata
- (Japan) Atsushi Yanagisawa
- (South Korea) Lee Dong-gook
- (South Korea) Lee Chun-soo
- (Kuwait) Jamal Mubarak
- (Kuwait) Bader Najem
- (Morocco) El Houssaine Ouchla
- (Nigeria) Bright Igbinadolor
- (Nigeria) Pius Ikedia
- (Nigeria) Garba Lawal
- (Slovakia) Juraj Czinege
- (Slovakia) Ján Šlahor
- (South Africa) Quinton Fortune
- (South Africa) Steve Lekoelea
- (South Africa) Benni McCarthy
- (Spain) Miguel Ángel Angulo
- (Spain) Jesús María Lacruz
- (Spain) Raúl Tamudo
- (Spain) Toni Velamazán
- (United States) Danny Califf
- (United States) Landon Donovan

1 own goal

- (Cameroon) Patrice Abanda (playing against Chile)
- (Honduras) Jaime Rosales (playing against Australia)
- (Italy) Gianni Comandini (playing against Honduras)
- (Nigeria) Samuel Okunowo (playing against Italy)
- (Slovakia) Marián Čišovský (playing against Brazil)
- (Spain) Iván Amaya (playing against Cameroon)

== Bibliography ==
- Higham, James (2012). Sport Tourism Destinations. Routledge. ISBN 978-0-7506-5937-6.
