= 2001 African U-17 Championship qualification =

The 2001 African U-17 Championship qualification was a men's under-17 football competition which decided the participating teams of the 2001 African U-17 Championship.

== Qualification ==
=== Preliminary round ===
The first leg matches were played on either the 14th or 16 April 2000. The second leg matches were played on either the 28th or 30 April 2000. The winners advanced to the First Round.

Team 1	Agg.	Team 2	1st leg	2nd leg
Eritrea	2 – 4	Burundi	1 – 2	1 – 2
Swaziland	2 – 6	Tanzania	1 – 2	1 – 4
Malawi	4 – 0	Mauritius	3 – 0	1 – 0
Equatorial Guinea	5 – 0	São Tomé and Príncipe	4 – 0	1 – 0
Rwanda	1 – 2	Mozambique	0 – 1	1 – 1
Madagascar	3 – 4	Lesotho	1 – 1	2 – 3
Zimbabwe	5 – 2	Botswana	1 – 1	4 – 1
Sierra Leone	0 – 1	Gambia	0 – 0	0 – 1
Libya	0 – 8 d	Chad	0 – 3	0 – 5
Kenya	2 – 0	Somalia	2 – 0	
Namibia	w/o	Gabon	–	–
Senegal	w/o	Guinea-Bissau	–	–
Sudan	w/o	Congo	–	–
Togo	w/o	Algeria	–	–
Liberia	w/o	Ivory Coast	–	–

=== First round ===
The first leg matches were played on either 23 or 25 June 2000. The second leg matches were played on either 7 or 9 July 2000. The winners advanced to the second round.

Team 1	Agg.	Team 2	1st leg	2nd leg
Namibia	2 – 7	Cameroon	2 – 1	0 – 6
Tanzania	0 – 2	Burundi	0 – 0	0 – 2
Senegal	2 – 3	Nigeria	2 – 0	0 – 3
Malawi	3 – 2	Angola	1 – 0	2 – 2
Equatorial Guinea	2 – 3	South Africa	2 – 1	0 – 2
Mozambique	3 – 1	Kenya	2 – 0	1 – 1
Lesotho	4 – 5	Ethiopia	0 – 5	4 – 0
Zimbabwe	1 – 3	Zambia	0 – 1	1 – 2
Gambia	2 – 1	Ghana	1 – 0	1 – 1
Libya	0 – 11	Burkina Faso	0 – 5	0 – 6
Morocco	3 – 9	Mali	1 – 5	2 – 4
Tunisia	0 – 3	Guinea	0 – 0	0 – 3
Sudan	w/o	Egypt	–	–
Liberia	w/o	Algeria	–	–

=== Second round ===
The first leg matches were played on either 11 or 12 November 2000. The second leg matches were played on either 24, 25 or 26 November. The winners advanced to the finals.

Team 1	Agg.	Team 2	1st leg	2nd leg
Burundi	3 – 4	Cameroon	2 – 2	1 – 2
Malawi	1 – 4	Nigeria	1 – 1	0 – 3
Mozambique	2 – 1	South Africa	1 – 0	1 – 1
Zambia	1 – 1 (p 3 – 4)	Ethiopia	1 – 0	0 – 1
Burkina Faso	1 – 1 (p 4 – 2)	Gambia	1 – 0	0 – 1
Mali	6 – 0	Sudan	3 – 0	3 – 0
Algeria	w/o	Guinea	1 – 5	w/o

== Qualified teams ==
- Burkina Faso
- Cameroon
- Ethiopia
- Guinea
- Mali
- Mozambique
- Nigeria
- Seychelles (host nation)
