= 2003 African U-17 Championship qualification =

The 2003 African U-17 Championship qualification was a men's under-17 football competition which decided the participating teams of the 2003 African U-17 Championship.

== Qualification ==
=== Preliminary round ===
The first leg matches were played on either 29 or 30 June 2002. The second leg matches were played on 14 July 2000. The winners advanced to the first round.

Team 1	Agg.	Team 2	1st leg	2nd leg
Zimbabwe	7–1	Mauritius	5–1	2–0
Angola	11–2	São Tomé and Príncipe	5–0	6–2
Lesotho	3–0	Namibia	0–0	3–0
Botswana	0–3	Tanzania	0–1	0–2
Eritrea	1–3	Kenya	0–0	1–3
Liberia	w/o	Sierra Leone	–	–
Algeria	w/o	Mauritania	–	–
Gabon	w/o	Togo	–	–
Senegal	w/o	Guinea-Bissau	–	–
Libya	w/o	Niger	–	–
Ivory Coast	w/o	Equatorial Guinea	–	–
Uganda	w/o	Somalia	–	–

=== First round ===
The first leg matches were played on either 21 or 22 December 2002. The second leg matches were played on either 11 or 12 January 2003, except for the Burkina Faso vs Sierra Leone match, which was played on 16 February. The winners advanced to the second round.

Team 1	Agg.	Team 2	1st leg	2nd leg
Sierra Leone	1–1 (a)	Burkina Faso	0–0	1–1
Algeria	1–2	Tunisia	0–0	1–2
Gabon	1–2	Cameroon	1–0	0–2
Senegal	4–0	Morocco	1–0	3–0
Zimbabwe	2–3	Malawi	2–1	0–2
Libya	0–1	Egypt	0–1	0–0
Ivory Coast	0–3	Guinea	0–2	0–1
Angola	3–3 (a)	Mozambique	2–3	1–0
Gambia	1–1 (p 4–2)	Mali	0–1	1–0
Lesotho	2–5	South Africa	1–1	1–4
Tanzania	2–6	Ethiopia	1–1	1–5
Kenya	3–2	Ghana	2–0	1–2
Zambia	4–1	Somalia	4–1	
Sudan	w/o	Nigeria	–	–

=== Second round ===
The matches were played on different dates from 2 February to 15 March. The winners advanced to the finals.

Team 1	Agg.	Team 2	1st leg	2nd leg
Sierra Leone	2–1	Tunisia	1–0	1–1
Cameroon	1–0	Senegal	1–0	0–0
Malawi	0–3	Egypt	0–1	0–2
Guinea	4–2	Mozambique	3–0	1–2
Gambia	2–1	Zambia	1–1	1–0
Nigeria	4–2	South Africa	3–1	1–1
Ethiopia	w/o	Kenya	2–0	w/o

== Qualified teams ==
- Cameroon
- Egypt
- Ethiopia
- Gambia
- Guinea
- Nigeria
- Sierra Leone
- Swaziland (host nation)
