= 1999 African U-17 Championship qualification =

The 1999 African U-17 Championship qualification was a men's under-17 football competition which decided the participating teams of the 1999 African U-17 Championship.

== Qualification ==
=== Preliminary round ===
The first leg matches were played on either 18 or 19 July 1998. The second leg matches were played on either 1 or 2 August 1998. The winners advanced to the First Round.

Team 1	Agg.	Team 2	1st leg	2nd leg
Namibia	1 – 4	Swaziland	1 – 1	0 – 3
Liberia	4 – 4 (a)	Togo	3 – 0	1 – 4
Lesotho	w/o	Tanzania	–	–
Malawi	w/o	Uganda	–	–
Gabon	w/o	Burundi	–	–

=== First round ===
The first leg matches were played on either the 20, 21, 22 or 23 November 1998. The second leg matches were played on either 4, 5 or 6 December 1998, except for the Libya vs Tunisia match, which was played on 18 December. The winners advanced to the Second Round.

Team 1	Agg.	Team 2	1st leg	2nd leg
Algeria	0 – 6	Burkina Faso	0 – 4	0 – 2
Ghana	5 – 2	Benin	4 – 1	1 – 1
Tunisia	3 – 1	Libya	2 – 1	1 – 0
Senegal	2 – 4	Mali	2 – 1	0 – 3
Zimbabwe	5 – 2	Lesotho	2 – 2	3 – 0
South Africa	7 – 3	Swaziland	5 – 1	2 – 2
Nigeria	6 – 1	Liberia	3 – 0	3 – 1
Angola	1 – 0	Botswana	1 – 0	0 – 0
Zambia	3 – 2	Malawi	3 – 0	0 – 2
Cameroon	6 – 2	Gabon	2 – 1	4 – 1
Mozambique	w/o	Ethiopia	0 – 1	w/o
Egypt	w/o	Sudan	–	–
Morocco	w/o	Mauritania	–	–
Ivory Coast	w/o	Congo	–	–

=== Second round ===
The matches were played on different dates from 6 February to 21 March. The winners advanced to the Finals.

Team 1	Agg.	Team 2	1st leg	2nd leg
Egypt	0 – 0 (p 2 – 3)	Burkina Faso	0 – 0	0 – 0
Ghana	8 – 0	Tunisia	5 – 0	3 – 0
Morocco	1 – 3	Mali	0 – 2	1 – 1
Zimbabwe	4 – 3	South Africa	1 – 2	3 – 1
Ethiopia	2 – 4	Nigeria	2 – 2	0 – 2
Angola	4 – 2	Zambia	4 – 2	0 – 0
Ivory Coast	0 – 3	Cameroon	0 – 1	0 – 2

== Qualified teams ==
- Angola
- Burkina Faso
- Cameroon
- Ghana
- Guinea (host nation)
- Mali
- Nigeria
- Zimbabwe
