= 1995 African U-17 Championship qualification =

The 1995 African U-17 Championship qualification was a men's under-17 football competition which decided the participating teams of the 1995 African U-17 Championship.

== Qualification ==
=== First round ===
The winners advanced to the Second Round.

Team 1	Agg.	Team 2	1st leg	2nd leg
South Africa	4 – 2	Zimbabwe	3 – 1	1 – 1
Zambia	6 – 1 d	Botswana	6 – 0	0 – 1
Mauritius	0 – 4	Malawi	0 – 1	0 – 3
Egypt	5 – 1	Algeria	2 – 0	3 – 1
Guinea-Bissau	1 – 2	Guinea	1 – 1	0 – 1
Nigeria	5 – 1	Angola	2 – 1	3 – 0
Togo	1 – 3	Ghana	0 – 1	1 – 2
Tunisia	w/o	Benin	–	–
Ivory Coast	w/o	Congo	–	–
Sierra Leone	w/o	Senegal	–	–
Tanzania	w/o	Cameroon	–	–
Sudan	w/o	Uganda	–	–
Mozambique	w/o	Zaire	–	–
Morocco	w/o	Cape Verde	–	–

=== Second round ===
The winners advanced to the Finals.

Team 1	Agg.	Team 2	1st leg	2nd leg
South Africa	0 – 2	Mozambique	0 – 0	0 – 2
Egypt	0 – 1	Sudan	0 – 0	0 – 1
Morocco	1 – 2	Tunisia	1 – 0	0 – 2
Tanzania	0 – 2	Guinea	0 – 0	0 – 2
Ivory Coast	2 – 4	Nigeria	1 – 1	1 – 3
Sierra Leone	1 – 2	Ghana	1 – 0	0 – 2
Botswana	2 – 1	Malawi	2 – 0	0 – 1

== Qualified teams ==
- Botswana
- Ghana
- Guinea
- Mali (host nation)
- Mozambique
- Nigeria
- Sudan
- Tunisia
