= 2009 CECAFA U-17 Championship =

- CECAFA Logo

Tournament details
- Host country: Sudan
- City: Khartoum, Juba & Kessela
- Dates: August 23 - September 6
- Teams: 8 (from CAF confederations)
- Venue: 2 (in 1 host city)

Final positions
- Champions: Uganda (1st title)
- Runners-up: Eritrea
- Third place: Tanzania
- Fourth place: Sudan

The 2009 CECAFA U-17 Championship was the 2nd edition of the CECAFA U-17 Championship organized bt CECAFA (Council of East and Central Africa Football Association. The second edition of the CEFAFA U-17 Championship, all games were originally to be played in Nairobi, Kenya but have since been moved to Sudan. due to financial reasons, the Sudanese FA and El Merreikh Investment Group have agreed to sponsor the tournament.

The cup is also referred to as the Bashir Cup and the Hassan el Bashir Cup by East African media due to Sudanese President Omar al-Bashir's involvement.

There is a possibility that a third group will be based at Kessala.

== Participants ==
- Burundi
- Djibouti (Note: Djibouti withdrew from tournament)
- Eritrea
- Ethiopia
- Malawi
- Kenya
- Rwanda
- Somalia
- Sudan (Note: Sudan was banished from the tournament for fielding sixteen over-age players.)
- Tanzania
- Uganda
- Zanzibar
- Egypt (invited) (Note: Egypt withdrew from the tournament and was not replaced by another team)
- Nigeria (invited) (Note: Nigeria withdrew from tournament and were replaced by Malawi)

== Officials ==
List of officials
Nationality	Referee(s)	Assistant referee(s)
Burundi	—	Hakizimana Jean Marie
Djibouti	Hassan Ali Mohamed	—
Eritrea	Luleseged Ghebremichael	Muhamed Hugush
Ethiopia	—	Tilahun Fekadu; Muhamed Sultan
Kenya	Thomas Onyango	Elias Wamalwa
Rwanda	Issa Kagabo	—
Somalia	—	Olad Arab Bashir
Sudan	Mohamed Hussein; El-Nigomi Ahmed; Rassaz Librato	Medany Mustafa; Saeed Salih; Khalafala Abdel Aziz; Ahmad Ali Waleed
Tanzania	Israel Mujuni	Erasmo Jesse
Uganda	Dennis Batte	—
Zanzibar	—	Josephat Bulali

== Group stage ==
=== Group A ===
Pos	Team	Pld	W	D	L	GF	GA	GD	Pts	Qualification
1	Sudan	3	2	1	0	5	1	+4	7	Advance to knockout stage
2	Tanzania	3	2	0	1	4	4	0	6	Advance to knockout stage
3	Malawi	3	1	1	1	4	4	0	4	
4	Somalia	3	0	0	3	1	5	−4	0	

Rules for classification: Group stage tiebreakers

Tanzania	2–0	Somalia

Khartoum

Somalia	0–1	Sudan

Khartoum

Malawi	1–2	Tanzania

Khartoum

Sudan	3–0	Tanzania

Khartoum

Somalia	1–2	Malawi

Khartoum

Sudan	1–1	Malawi

Khartoum

=== Group B ===
Pos	Team	Pld	W	D	L	GF	GA	GD	Pts	Qualification
1	Uganda	3	2	0	1	8	2	+6	6	Advance to knockout stage
2	Zanzibar	3	2	0	1	4	2	+2	6	Advance to knockout stage
3	Ethiopia	3	2	0	1	2	4	−2	6	
4	Kenya	3	0	0	3	2	8	−6	0	

Rules for classification: Group stage tiebreakers

Zanzibar	1–0	Uganda

Juba Stadium, Juba

Kenya	0–1	Ethiopia

Juba Stadium, Juba

Uganda	4–1	Kenya

Juba Stadium, Juba

Zanzibar	0–1	Ethiopia

Juba Stadium, Juba

Kenya	1–3	Zanzibar

Juba Stadium, Juba

Ethiopia	0–4	Uganda

Juba Stadium, Juba

=== Group C ===
Pos	Team	Pld	W	D	L	GF	GA	GD	Pts	Qualification
1	Burundi	2	0	2	0	3	3	0	2	Advance to knockout stage
2	Eritrea	2	0	2	0	2	2	0	2	
3	Rwanda	2	0	2	0	1	1	0	2	

Rules for classification: Group stage tiebreakers

Eritrea	2–2	Burundi

Wad Madani

Rwanda	0–0	Eritrea

Wad Madani

Burundi	1–1	Rwanda

Wad Madani

== Knockout stage ==
In the knockout stages, if a match is level at the end of normal playing time, extra time is played (two periods of 15 minutes each) and followed, if necessary, by a penalty shoot-out to determine the winners.

=== Bracket ===
Quarter-finals
Khartoum
Tanzania	1
Ethiopia	0
Khartoum
Uganda	2
Malawi	0
Khartoum
Zanzibar	1
Eritrea	3
Khartoum
Burundi	0
Sudan	1

Semi-finals
28 October
Tanzania	1 (3)
Uganda	1 (5)
29 October
Eritrea	2
Sudan	1

Final
6 September
Uganda	2
Eritrea	0
Third place play-off
Tanzania	2
Sudan	0

=== Quarter-finals ===
Tanzania	1–0	Ethiopia
	Sifuni Tuzo score the only goal

Khartoum

Uganda	2–0	Malawi

Khartoum

Zanzibar	1–3	Eritrea

Khartoum

Burundi	0–1	Sudan

Khartoum

=== Semi-finals ===
28 October 2009
17:00

Tanzania	1–1	Uganda
Penalties
	3–5

29 October 2009
17:00

Eritrea	2–0	Sudan

=== Third place play-off ===
Tanzania	2–0	Sudan

=== Final ===
6 September 2009

Uganda	2–0	Eritrea
