= 2005 African U-17 Championship qualification =

The 2005 African U-17 Championship qualification was a men's under-17 football competition which decided the participating teams of the 2005 African U-17 Championship.

== Qualification ==
=== Preliminary round ===
The first leg matches were played on either the 26th or 27 June 2004. The second leg matches were played on either the 10th or 11 July 2004. The winners advanced to the First Round.

Team 1	Agg.	Team 2	1st leg	2nd leg
Rwanda	1 – 2	Tanzania	1 – 1	0 – 1
Central African Republic	3 – 1	Congo	3 – 0	0 – 1
Botswana	2 – 4	Lesotho	1 – 2	1 – 2
Burundi	2 – 1	Namibia	1 – 1	1 – 0
Somalia	w/o	Eritrea	–	–
Madagascar	w/o	Mauritius	–	–

=== First round ===
The first leg matches were played on either the 20th or 21 November 2004. The second leg matches were played on either the 4th or 5 November 2004. The winners advanced to the Second Round.

Team 1	Agg.	Team 2	1st leg	2nd leg
Senegal	5 – 6	Ivory Coast	1 – 4	4 – 2
Ghana	5 – 2	Tunisia	3 – 1	2 – 1
Mozambique	1 – 8	South Africa	0 – 3	1 – 5
Sudan	1 – 0	Eritrea	1 – 0	0 – 0
Zambia	1 – 4	Tanzania	1 – 2	0 – 2
Mali	4 – 3	Guinea	3 – 1	1 – 2
Sierra Leone	1 – 1 (a)	Nigeria	1 – 1	0 – 0
Cameroon	2 – 2 (a)	Burkina Faso	2 – 1	0 – 1
Libya	w/o	Morocco	–	–
Ethiopia	w/o	Egypt	–	–
Zimbabwe	w/o	Madagascar	–	–
Gabon	w/o	Central African Republic	–	–
Angola	w/o	Lesotho	–	–
DR Congo	w/o	Burundi	–	–

=== Second round ===
The first leg matches were played on either the 8th or 9 January 2005. The second leg matches were played on either the 22nd or 23 January 2005. The winners advanced to the Finals.

Team 1	Agg.	Team 2	1st leg	2nd leg
Morocco	0 – 3	Ivory Coast	0 – 2	0 – 1
Ethiopia	2 – 4	Ghana	2 – 1	0 – 3
South Africa	8 – 0	Sudan	5 – 0	3 – 0
Tanzania	4 – 1 d	Zimbabwe	3 – 1	1 – 0
Mali	4 – 1	Central African Republic	3 – 0	1 – 1
Angola	1 – 6	Nigeria	1 – 3	0 – 3
Burundi	3 – 5	Burkina Faso	2 – 0	1 – 5

== Qualified teams ==
- Burkina Faso
- Gambia (host nation)
- Ghana
- Ivory Coast
- Mali
- Nigeria
- South Africa
- Zimbabwe
