= 2022 CECAFA U-17 Championship =

Tournament details
- Host country: Ethiopia
- City: Addis Ababa,
- Dates: 3-15 October 2022
- Teams: 10 (from CAF confederations)
- Venue(s): 1 (in 1 host city)

Final positions
- Champions: Somalia (1st title)
- Runners-up: South Sudan

Tournament statistics
- Matches played: 10
- Goals scored: 30 (3 per match)
- Top scorer(s): (Tanzania) Sylvester Otto (4 goals)

The 2022 CECAFA U17 Championship was the 5th CECAFA U-17 Championship organized by CECAFA (¨Council of East and Central Africa Football Association). It took place from October 3 to October 15, 2022 in Addis Ababa, Ethiopia .

This competition also served as the CECAFA qualifiers for the 2023 Africa U-17 Cup of Nations as the two finalists of the tournament represented CECAFA in the CAF U-17 continental competition.

The ten teams were initially drawn into two groups of five teams. Ethiopia, Tanzania, Somalia, South Sudan and Eritrea were drawn into Group A and Uganda, Djibouti, Sudan, Burundi and Rwanda were drawn into Group B. However, on 26 September, Eritrea and Rwanda withdrew from the competition, leaving both the groups with four teams. On 1 October, Djibouti and Sudan were disqualified from the tournament after some of their players failed the MRI test, leaving Group B with only two teams. The winners and the runners-up of each group advanced to the semi-finals.

== Venue ==
- Abebe Bikila Stadium, Addis Ababa - Ethiopia

== Teams ==
- Burundi
- Djibouti - Withdrew
- Eritrea - Withdrew*
- Ethiopia (Hosts)
- Rwanda - Withdrew*
- Somalia
- South Sudan
- Sudan - Withdrew
- Tanzania
- Uganda

== Match officials ==
Referees

- Diaffari Nduwumana (Burundi)
- Ahmed Arajiga (Tanzania)
- Abdelaziz Yasser Ahmed(Sudan)
- Mitiku Tewodros (Ethiopia)
- Nasser Mohamud Hussein(Djibouti)
- Ahmed Hassan Hussein (Somalia)
- (South Africa) (Ms) Jelly Chavani
- Shamirah Nabadda (Uganda)
- (Egypt) Mahmoud Ahmed Nagi Musa
- (Nigeria) Kassim Abdelsalam

Assistant Referees

- Renovat Bizumuremyi (Burundi)
- Mohamed Abdelgabar (Sudan)
- Elmoiz Ali Mohamed Ahmed (Sudan)
- (South Sudan) Gasim Mader (South Sudan)
- Adam Ali Eid (Somalia)
- Tigle Belachew (Ethiopia)
- Fasika Yehualashet Biru (Ethiopia)
- Seif Kassim Mpanga (Tanzania)
- Ronald Katenya (Uganda)
- (Djibouti) Mohamed Charmarke

== Group stage ==
Original Groups

- Group A

Pos	Team	Pld	W	D	L	GF	GA	GD	Pts	Qualification
1	Ethiopia (H)	0	0	0	0	0	0	0	0	Semi-finals
2	Tanzania	0	0	0	0	0	0	0	0	Semi-finals
3	Somalia	0	0	0	0	0	0	0	0	
4	South Sudan	0	0	0	0	0	0	0	0	
5	Eritrea	0	0	0	0	0	0	0	0	Withdrew (Note: On 26 September 2022, Eritrea withdrew from the competition.)

Rules for classification: Group tiebreakers
(H) Hosts
Notes:

- Group B

Pos	Team	Pld	W	D	L	GF	GA	GD	Pts	Qualification
1	Uganda	0	0	0	0	0	0	0	0	Semi-finals
2	Burundi	0	0	0	0	0	0	0	0	Semi-finals
3	Djibouti	0	0	0	0	0	0	0	0	Withdrew (Note: On 26 September 2022, Rwanda withdrew from the competition.also Djibuti and Sudan on september 28)
4	Sudan	0	0	0	0	0	0	0	0	Withdrew
5	Rwanda	0	0	0	0	0	0	0	0	Withdrew

Rules for classification: Group tiebreakers
Notes:
- On october 1st the CECAFA announced the disqualification of Sudan and Djibouti. A new draw was set for 2 October with on 6 team .

=== Group A ===
Pos	Team	Pld	W	D	L	GF	GA	GD	Pts	Qualification
1	Tanzania	2	2	0	0	5	3	+2	6	Semi-finals
2	Somalia	2	1	0	1	2	2	0	3	Semi-finals
3	Ethiopia (H)	2	0	0	2	2	4	−2	0	

Rules for classification: Group tiebreakers
(H) Hosts
3 October 2022
16:00

Ethiopia	0–1	Somalia
	Report	A. Abdi 12'

Abebe Bikila Stadium, Addis Ababa
Referee: Djaffari Nduwimana (Burundi)

6 October 2022
16:00

Tanzania	3–2	Ethiopia
Otto 3', 15'; Iddi 87'	Report	Seyoum 9', 20'

Abebe Bikila Stadium, Addis Ababa
Referee: Jelly Chavani (South Africa)

9 October 2022
13:00

Somalia	1–2	Tanzania
Bilal 38'	Report	Otto 75', 79'

Abebe Bikila Stadium, Addis Ababa
Referee: Yasir Abdelaziz (Sudan)

=== Group B ===
Pos	Team	Pld	W	D	L	GF	GA	GD	Pts	Qualification
1	Uganda	2	2	0	0	8	1	+7	6	Semi-finals
2	South Sudan	2	0	1	1	2	5	−3	1	Semi-finals
3	Burundi	2	0	1	1	1	5	−4	1	

Rules for classification: Group tiebreakers
3 October 2022
13:00

Uganda	4–0	Burundi
Yiga 17', 45'; Nkoola 35'; Okello 55'	Report

Abebe Bikila Stadium, Addis Ababa
Referee: Abdulsalam Kassim (Nigeria)

6 October 2022
13:00

South Sudan	1–4	Uganda
Okenny 67'	Report	Nkoola 25', 51'; Sembuusi 37'; Walusimbi 45+1'

Abebe Bikila Stadium, Addis Ababa
Referee: Ahmed Arajiga (Tanzania)

9 October 2022
16:00

Burundi	1–1	South Sudan
Harimbabazi 65'	Report	Mabil 83'

Abebe Bikila Stadium, Addis Ababa
Referee: Shamirah Nabadda (Uganda)

== Knockout stage ==
In the knockout stages, if a match is level at the end of normal playing time, extra time is played (two periods of 15 minutes each) and followed, if necessary, by a penalty shoot-out to determine the winners.

Semi-finals
12 October – Abebe Bikila Stadium
Uganda	1 (7)
Somalia (p)	1 (8)
12 October – Abebe Bikila Stadium
Tanzania	1 (3)
South Sudan (p)	1 (4)

Final
15 October – Abebe Bikila Stadium
Somalia	3
South Sudan	1
Third place
15 October – Abebe Bikila Stadium
Uganda	1 (1)
Tanzania (p)	1 (4)

=== Semi-finals ===
Winners qualified for 2023 Africa U-17 Cup of Nations.

12 October 2022
12:00

Uganda	1–1	Somalia
Ssemwogerere 42'	Report	A. Abdi 44'
Penalties
Yiga (penalty scored); Ssonko (penalty scored); Wandera (penalty scored); Walusimbi (penalty scored); Ssekajugo (penalty scored); Okello (penalty scored); Tumwesigye (penalty scored); Nkoola (penalty missed)	7–8	(penalty scored) Abdullahi; (penalty scored) Abdukadir; (penalty scored) Abdalla; (penalty scored) Bilal; (penalty scored) M. Abdi; (penalty scored) A. Abdi; (penalty scored) Nor; (penalty scored) Ali

Abebe Bikila Stadium, Addis Ababa
Referee: Tewodros Mitiku (Ethiopia)
12 October 2022
15:30

Tanzania	1–1	South Sudan
Charles 71'	Report	Gem 37'
Penalties
Omar (penalty scored); Farid (penalty scored); M. Salum (penalty scored); Hamisi (penalty missed); Charles (penalty missed)	3–4	(penalty missed) Obama; (penalty scored) Mabil; (penalty scored) Moses; (penalty scored) Taban; (penalty scored) Gem

Abebe Bikila Stadium, Addis Ababa
Referee: Abdulsalam Kassim (Nigeria)

=== Third place ===
15 October 2022
12:00

Uganda	1–1	Tanzania
Lubega 45+2'	Report	Omar 52'
Penalties
Yiga (penalty missed); Ssonko (penalty missed); Ouke (penalty scored)	1–4	(penalty scored) Omar; (penalty scored) M. Salum; (penalty scored) Kapil; (penalty scored) Farid

Abebe Bikila Stadium, Addis Ababa
Referee: Nasser Houssein (Djibouti)

=== Final ===
15 October 2022
15:00

Somalia	3–1	South Sudan
A. Abdi 6'; Dahir 59', 71' (goat)	Report	Minari 48'

Abebe Bikila Stadium, Addis Ababa
Referee: Shamirah Nabadda (Uganda)

== Goalscorers ==
There were 30 goals scored in 10 matches, for an average of 3 goals per match.

4 goals

- (Tanzania) Sylvester Otto

3 goals

- (Somalia) Abdihafid Abdi
- (Uganda) Arafat Nkoola

2 goals

- (Ethiopia) Biruk Seyoum
- (Somalia) Abdirahin Dahir
- (Uganda) Alex Yiga

1 goal

- (Burundi) Ramadhan Harimbabazi
- (Somalia) Idris Bilal
- (South Sudan) Jonathan Gem
- (South Sudan) David Mabil
- (South Sudan) Ajo Minari
- (South Sudan) Abraham Okenny
- (Tanzania) Yasin Charles
- (Tanzania) Idrisa Iddi
- (Tanzania) Ally Omar
- (Uganda) Farouk Lubega
- (Uganda) Richard Okello
- (Uganda) Patrick Sembuusi
- (Uganda) Jamal Ssemwogerere
- (Uganda) Abubakali Walusimbi

== Qualification for CAF U17 Cup of Nations ==
The two finalists of the tournament qualified for the 2023 Africa U-17 Cup of Nations.
