= Kenya national under-17 football team =

National under-17 association football team representing DR Congo

Kenya U-17
- Nickname: Harambee Stars
- Association: Football Kenya Federation
- Confederation: CAF
- Sub-confederation: CECAFA
- Head coach: (Kenya) Oliver Page
- Captain: Clinton Machaka
- Home stadium: Nairobi City Stadium
- FIFA code: KEN
First colours	Second colours

First international
- Kenya 2–0 Somalia (Nairobi, Kenya; 14 April 2001)

Biggest win
- Kenya 9–0 Djibouti (Dar es Salam, Kenya; 17 August 2018)

Biggest defeat
- Cameroon 7–0 Kenya (Bafoussam, Cameron; 7 August 2016)

U-17 Africa Cup of Nations
- Appearances: None

CECAFA U-17 Championship
- Appearances: 4 (first in 2007)
- Best result: Third-place (2007)

FIFA U-17 World Cup
- Appearances: None

The Kenya national under-17 football team, nicknamed the Harambee Stars, represents Kenya in international youth football competitions. Its primary role is the development of players in preparation for the senior national team. The team competes in a variety of competitions, including the biennial FIFA U-17 World Cup and the U-17 Africa Cup of Nations, which is the top competitions for this age group.

== Team image ==
=== Nicknames ===
The Kenya national under-17 football team has been known or nicknamed as Harambee Stars.

=== Home stadium ===
The team play its home matches on the Nairobi City Stadium and others stadiums.

== Fixtures and results ==
legend

Win Draw Loss Fixtures

== Competitive record ==
=== FIFA U-17 World Cup ===
FIFA U-17 World Cup record
Year	Round	Position	GP	W	D*	L	GS	GA
(China) 1985	Did not enter							
(Canada) 1987	Did not enter							
(Scotland) 1989	Withdrew							
(Italy) 1991	Did not enter							
(Japan) 1993	Withdrew							
(Ecuador) 1995	Did not enter							
(Egypt) 1997	Did not enter							
(New Zealand) 1999	Did not enter							
(Trinidad and Tobago) 2001	Did not qualify							
(Finland) 2003	Withdrew							
(Peru) 2005	Banned							
(South Korea) 2007	Did not enter							
(Nigeria) 2009	Did not qualify							
(Mexico) 2011	Did not qualify							
(United Arab Emirates) 2013	Withdrew							
(Chile) 2015	Withdrew							
(India) 2017	Did not qualify							
(Brazil) 2019	Did not qualify							
(Peru) ~~2021~~	Did not held							
(Indonesia) 2023	Did not qualify							
(Qatar) 2025	Did not qualify							
(Qatar) 2026	To be determined							
Total	0/20		0	0	0	0	0	0

=== U-17 Africa Cup of Nations record ===
U-17 Africa Cup of Nations
Year	Round	Position	GP	W	D*	L	GS	GA
(Mali) 1995	Did not enter							
(Botswana) 1997	Did not enter							
(Guinea) 1999	Did not enter							
(Seychelles) 2001	Did not qualify							
(Eswatini) 2003	Withdrew							
(The Gambia) 2005	Banned							
(Togo) 2007	Did not enter							
(Algeria) 2009	Did not qualify							
(Rwanda) 2011	Did not qualify							
(Morocco) 2013	Withdrew							
(Niger) 2015	Withdrew							
(Gabon) 2017	Did not qualify							
(Tanzania) 2019	Did not qualify							
(Algeria) 2023	Did not enter							
(Morocco) 2025	Did not qualify							
Total	0/15		0	0	0	0	0	0

=== CECAFA U-17 Championship ===
CECAFA U-17 Championship record
Year	Result	Position	Pld	W	D	L	GF	GA
(Burundi) 2007	3rd Place	–	4	1	1	2	5	10
(Sudan) 2009	Group stage	–	3	0	0	3	2	8
(Burundi) 2018	4th Place	–	5	1	1	3	6	7
(Rwanda) 2020	Group stage	–	2	0	1	1	2	7
(Ethiopia) 2022	Did Not participated							
Total	4/5	0 Title	14	2	3	9	15	32

== See also ==
- Kenya national football team
- Kenya national under-20 football team
