= South Sudan national under-17 football team =

Men's national association football team representing South Sudan

South Sudan U-17
- Nickname: Bright Stars
- Association: South Sudan Football Association
- Confederation: CAF (Africa)
- Sub-confederation: CECAFA (East & Central Africa)
- Head coach: (South Sudan) Bilal Felix Komoyangi
- Captain: Mario Taban
- Home stadium: Malakal Stadium
- FIFA code: SSD
First colours	Second colours

First international
- South Sudan 2–1 Djibouti (Dar es Salam, Tanzania; 12 August 2018)

Biggest win
- South Sudan 2–1 Djibouti (Dar es Salam, Tanzania; 12 August 2018)

Biggest defeat
- South Sudan 1–6 Uganda (Dar es Salam, Tanzania; 17 August 2018)

FIFA U-17 World Cup
- Appearances: 0

CECAFA U-17 Championship
- Appearances: 1 (first in 2022)
- Best result: Runners-up, (2022)

Africa U-17 Cup of Nations
- Appearances: 1 (first in 2023)
Medal record
CECAFA U-17 Championship
Silver medal – second place	2022 Ethiopia

The South Sudan national under-17 football team represents South Sudan at age of under-17 levels in the international football and is controlled by the South Sudan Football Association, the governing body for football in South Sudan.

== Team image ==
=== Nicknames ===
The South Sudan national under-17 football team has been known or nicknamed as Bright Stars

=== Home stadium ===
The team play its home matches on the Malakal Stadium and others stadiums.

== History ==
The South Sudan national under-17 football team played their debut game against Djibouti on 12 August 2018 at Dar es Salaam, Tanzania, winning 2–1. The team qualified for the first time in the 2023 Africa U-17 Cup of Nations which will take place in Algeria after finishing as runners-up in the 2022 CECAFA U-17 Championship.

== Current squad ==
The following squad was announced for recently finished 2022 CECAFA U-17 Championship

As of 13 December 2022

No.	Pos.	Player	Date of birth (age)	Caps	Goals	Club
1	GK	Nasona Victor	2 June 2005	0	0	(South Sudan Football Association)
2	GK	Samuel Duku	17 January 2004	0	0	(South Sudan Football Association)
3	GK	Abdusalam Hasaballah	15 May 2005	0	0	(South Sudan Football Association)
4	DF	Amos Moses	8 January 2005	0	0	(South Sudan Football Association)
5	DF	Kharbino Wel	9 September 2005	0	0	(South Sudan Football Association)
6	DF	David Mabil	20 November 2005	0	0	(South Sudan Football Association)
7	DF	Emmanuel John	26 February 2005	0	0	(South Sudan Football Association)
8	FW	Mario Taban (Captain)	29 March 2005	0	0	(South Sudan Football Association)
9	DF	Felix Obama	April 2003	0	0	(South Sudan Football Association)
10	DF	Francis Michael	22 December 2005	0	0	(South Sudan Football Association)
11	DF	Gama Hassen	30 January 2004	0	0	(South Sudan Football Association)
12	DF	James Samuel	6 December 2004	0	0	(South Sudan Football Association)
13	DF	Samuel Ceasar	14 July 2005	0	0	(South Sudan Football Association)
14	MF	Ronaldo Daniel	9 August 2005	0	0	(South Sudan Football Association)
15	MF	Rewde Maliah	2 September 2005	0	0	(South Sudan Football Association)
16	MF	Judu Thuch	8 October 2005	0	0	(South Sudan Football Association)
17	MF	Shakir Mohamed	22 February 2005	0	0	(South Sudan Football Association)
18	MF	Ajo Minari	5 January 2006	0	0	(South Sudan Football Association)
19	FW	Jonathan Gem	22 may 2004	0	0	(South Sudan Football Association)
20	FW	Manjistu Jido	4 July 2005	0	0	(South Sudan Football Association)
21	FW	Godfery Geri	23 July 2005	0	0	(South Sudan Football Association)
22	FW	Gbindiva Victor	26 January 2006	0	0	(South Sudan Football Association)
23	FW	Ajong Uber	10 January 2005	0	0	(South Sudan Football Association)
24	FW	Abraham Okenny	18 July 2005	0	0	(South Sudan Football Association)

== Fixtures and results ==
Legend

Win Draw Loss Fixture

== Competition records ==
=== FIFA U-17 World Cup ===
FIFA U-17 World Cup Record
Hosts / Year	Result	Position	GP	W	D*	L	GS	GA
(United Arab Emirates) 2013	Did not qualify							
(Chile) 2015	Did not qualify							
(India) 2017	Did not qualify							
(Brazil) 2019	Did not qualify							
(Peru) 2021	Cancelled							
(Indonesia) 2023	Disqualified							
(Qatar) 2025	Did not qualify							
Total	0/6	–	0	0	0	0	0	0

=== Africa U-17 Cup of Nations ===
Africa U-17 Cup of Nations Record
Hosts / Year	Result	Position	GP	W	D*	L	GS	GA
(Morocco) 2013	Did not qualify							
(Niger) 2015	Did not qualify							
(Gabon) 2017	Did not qualify							
(Tanzania) 2019	Did not qualify							
(Morocco) ~~2021~~	Cancelled							
(Algeria) 2023	Disqualified							
(Morocco) 2025	Did not qualify							
Total	0/6	–	0	0	0	0	0	0

=== CECAFA U-17 Championship ===
CECAFA U-17 Championship Record
Hosts / Year	Result	Position	GP	W	D*	L	GS	GA
(Tanzania) 2018	Did not qualify							
(Rwanda) 2020	Did not qualify							
(Ethiopia) 2022	Runners-up	–	4	0	2	2	4	9
Total	1/3	–	4	0	2	2	4	9
