= 2021 U-17 Africa Cup of Nations =

Cancelled 14th edition of U-17 AFCON

2021 Africa U-17 Cup of Nations
كأس الأمم الأفريقية تحت 17 سنة 2021; Coupe d'Afrique des Nations U-17 2021

Tournament details
- Host country: Morocco
- Dates: Cancelled
- Teams: 12 (from 1 confederation)

The 2021 U-17 Africa Cup of Nations, known for sponsorship purposes as the 2021 Total U-17 Africa Cup of Nations, was planned to be the 14th edition (19th if editions of the tournament without hosts are included) of the biennial African youth football tournament organized by the Confederation of African Football (CAF) for players aged 17 and below. Cameroon would have been the defending champions.

CAF announced Morocco as hosts of this edition in September 2018. This would have been the first edition of the tournament to feature 12 teams in the group stages instead of 8 from previous editions. The semi-finalists would have normally qualified for the 2021 FIFA U-17 World Cup in Peru as the CAF representatives. However, FIFA decided on 24 December 2020 to cancel that tournament due to the COVID-19 pandemic.

This edition of the tournament was originally scheduled to take place between 13 and 31 March 2021. However, CAF announced on 8 March 2021 that the tournament had been cancelled due to the COVID-19 pandemic both in Morocco and in Africa at large. Zambia offered to host the tournament at a later date to be agreed upon with CAF which never materialized.

== Qualification ==
On 20 July 2017, CAF decided that the qualification format should be changed and split according to zones.

=== Player eligibility ===
Players born 1 January 2004 or later are eligible to participate in the competition.

=== Qualified teams ===
The following twelve teams qualified for the final tournament.

Note: All appearance statistics count only those since the introduction of final tournament in 1995.

Team	Zone	Appearance	Previous best performance
Morocco (hosts)	North Zone	3rd	Fourth place (2013)
Algeria	North Zone	2nd	Runners-up (2009)
Senegal	West A Zone	3rd	Group stage (2011, 2019)
Mali	West A Zone	9th	Champions (2015, (2017)
Nigeria	West B Zone	10th	Champions (2001, 2007)
Ivory Coast	West B Zone	6th	Champions (2013)
Tanzania	Central-East Zone	3rd	Group stage (2017, 2019)
Uganda	Central-East Zone	2nd	Group stage (2019)
Cameroon	Central Zone	8th	Champions (2003, 2019)
Congo	Central Zone	3rd	Third place (2011)
South Africa	South Zone	4th	Runners-up (2015)
Zambia	South Zone	2nd	Group stage (2015)

== Draw ==
The draw of the group stage was held on 24 February 2021, 13:00 WAT (UTC+1). The 12 qualified teams were drawn into 3 groups of 4 teams.

Pot 1	Pot 2	Pot 3
Morocco (H); Cameroon; Nigeria	Tanzania; Senegal; Uganda	South Africa; Algeria; Ivory Coast; Congo; Mali; Zambia

== Group stage ==
The top two teams of each group advance to the quarter-finals along with the two best 3rd placed teams.

Tiebreakers:

Teams are ranked according to the three points for a win system (3 for a win, 1 for a draw and 0 or none for a loss) and if tied on points, the following tie-breaking criteria are applied, in the order given, to determine the rankings (Regulations Article 71):"U-17 AFCON Regulations" (PDF). CAFOnline.com. 20 October 2020.

1. Points in head-to-head matches among tied teams;
2. Goal difference in head-to-head matches among tied teams;
3. Goals scored in head-to-head matches among tied teams;
4. If more than two teams are tied, and after applying all head-to-head criteria above, a subset of teams are still tied, all head-to-head criteria above are reapplied exclusively to this subset of teams;
5. Goal difference in all group matches;
6. Goals scored in all group matches;
7. Drawing of lots.

All times are in WAT (UTC+1).

=== Group A ===
Pos	Team	Pld	W	D	L	GF	GA	GD	Pts
1	Morocco (H)	0	0	0	0	0	0	0	0
2	Uganda	0	0	0	0	0	0	0	0
3	Zambia	0	0	0	0	0	0	0	0
4	Ivory Coast	0	0	0	0	0	0	0	0

Rules for classification: Group stage tiebreakers
(H) Hosts
13 March 2021
20:00

Morocco	Cancelled	Uganda

Moulay Hassan Stadium, Rabat
14 March 2021
14:00

Zambia	Cancelled	Ivory Coast

Moulay Hassan Stadium, Rabat

16 March 2021
17:00

Uganda	Cancelled	Zambia

Moulay Hassan Stadium, Rabat
16 March 2021
20:00

Morocco	Cancelled	Ivory Coast

Moulay Hassan Stadium, Rabat

19 March 2021
20:00

Morocco	Cancelled	Zambia

Moulay Hassan Stadium, Rabat
19 March 2021
20:00

Ivory Coast	Cancelled	Uganda

El Bachir Stadium, Mohammedia

=== Group B ===
Pos	Team	Pld	W	D	L	GF	GA	GD	Pts
1	Nigeria	0	0	0	0	0	0	0	0
2	Tanzania	0	0	0	0	0	0	0	0
3	Algeria	0	0	0	0	0	0	0	0
4	Congo	0	0	0	0	0	0	0	0

Rules for classification: Group stage tiebreakers
14 March 2021
17:00

Nigeria	Cancelled	Tanzania

El Bachir Stadium, Mohammedia
14 March 2021
20:00

Congo	Cancelled	Algeria

El Bachir Stadium, Mohammedia

17 March 2021
17:00

Tanzania	Cancelled	Algeria

El Bachir Stadium, Mohammedia
17 March 2021
20:00

Congo	Cancelled	Nigeria

El Bachir Stadium, Mohammedia

20 March 2021
20:00

Algeria	Cancelled	Nigeria

El Bachir Stadium, Mohammedia
20 March 2021
20:00

Tanzania	Cancelled	Congo

Moulay Hassan Stadium, Rabat

=== Group C ===
Pos	Team	Pld	W	D	L	GF	GA	GD	Pts
1	Cameroon	0	0	0	0	0	0	0	0
2	Senegal	0	0	0	0	0	0	0	0
3	Mali	0	0	0	0	0	0	0	0
4	South Africa	0	0	0	0	0	0	0	0

Rules for classification: Group stage tiebreakers
15 March 2021
17:00

Cameroon	Cancelled	Senegal

Père Jégo Stadium, Casablanca
15 March 2021
20:00

South Africa	Cancelled	Mali

Père Jégo Stadium, Casablanca

March 2021
17:00

Senegal	Cancelled	Mali

Père Jégo Stadium, Casablanca
March 2021
20:00

South Africa	Cancelled	Cameroon

Père Jégo Stadium, Casablanca

March 2021
20:00

Cameroon	Cancelled	Mali

Père Jégo Stadium, Casablanca
March 2021
20:00

Senegal	Cancelled	South Africa

El Bachir Stadium, Mohammedia

== Ranking of third-placed teams ==
Pos	Grp	Team	Pld	W	D	L	GF	GA	GD	Pts
1	C	Mali	0	0	0	0	0	0	0	0
2	B	Algeria	0	0	0	0	0	0	0	0
3	A	Zambia	0	0	0	0	0	0	0	0

== Knockout stage ==
Quarter-finals
24 March 2021 – Mohammedia
A1
C3/B3
24 March 2021 – Rabat
B1
A2
25 March 2021 – Rabat
B2
C2
25 March 2021 – Casablanca
C1
A3/B3

Semi-finals
28 March 2021 – Mohammedia
Winner QF 1
Winner QF 4
28 March 2021 – Casablanca
Winner QF 2
Winner QF 3

Final
31 March 2021 – Mohammedia
Winner SF 1
Winner SF 2
Third place
30 Match 2021 – Casablanca
Loser SF 1
Loser SF 2

=== Quarter-finals ===
24 March 2021
17:00

A1	Cancelled	C3/B3

El Bachir Stadium, Mohammedia
24 March 2021
20:00

B1	Cancelled	A2

Moulay Hassan Stadium, Rabat
25 March 2021
17:00

B2	Cancelled	C2

Moulay Hassan Stadium, Rabat
25 March 2021
20:00

C1	Cancelled	A3/B3

Père Jégo Stadium, Casablanca

=== Semi-finals ===
28 March 2021
16:00

Winner QF 1	Cancelled	Winner QF 4

El Bachir Stadium, Mohammedia
28 March 2021
19:00

Winner QF 2	Cancelled	Winner QF 3

Père Jégo Stadium, Casablanca

=== Third place ===
30 March 2021
19:00

Loser SF 1	Cancelled	Loser SF 2

Père Jégo Stadium, Casablanca

=== Final ===
31 March 2021
19:00

Winner SF 1	Cancelled	Winner SF 2

El Bachir Stadium, Mohammedia

== Broadcasting ==
- Algeria - EPTV
- Angola - TPA
- Cameroon - CRTV
- Somalia - SNTV
- South Africa - SABC

== Final standings ==
Per statistical convention in football, matches decided in extra time are counted as wins and losses, while matches decided by a penalty shoot-out are counted as draws.

Pos.	Team	Pld	W	D	L	Pts	GF	GA	GD
1									
2									
3									
4									
Eliminated in the quarter-finals
5									
6									
7									
8									
Eliminated in group stage
9									
10									
11									
12									
