= 2018 CECAFA U-17 Championship =

Tournament details
- Host country: Burundi
- Cities: Ngozi, Muyinga & Gitenga
- Dates: 14 April – 29 April
- Teams: 8 (from CAF confederations)
- Venues: 3 (in 3 host cities)

Final positions
- Champions: Tanzania
- Runners-up: Somalia
- Third place: Uganda
- Fourth place: Kenya

Tournament statistics
- Matches played: 13
- Goals scored: 31 (2.38 per match)

The 2018 CECAFA U17 Championship was the 3rd CECAFA U-17 Championship organized by CECAFA (Council of East and Central Africa Football Association)

== Venues ==
- Urukundo Stadium, Ngozi
- Umuco Stadium, Muyinga
- Ingoma Stadium, Gitega

== Teams ==
- Burundi
- Somalia
- Ethiopia
- Kenya
- Sudan
- Tanzania
- Uganda
- Zanzibar (Note: Zanzibar was banished from the tournament for fielding twelve over-age players.)

== Officials ==
On 6 April 2018, CECAFA released the list of 7 referees and 8 assistant referees.

List of officials
| Nationality | Referee | Assistant referees |
|---|---|---|
| Burundi | Eric Manirakiza | Willy Habimana |
| Ethiopia | Amanuel Haleselass Worku | Yetayew Belachew |
| Kenya | Israel Mpaima | Oliver Omodi |
| Somalia | Mohamed Nur Muhdin | Hassan Hussein Mao |
| Sudan | Sabri Mohamed Fadul | Omer Hamid Ahmed |
| Tanzania | Emmanuel Mwandembwa | Mohamed Mkono |
| Uganda | William Oloya | Isa Masembe |
| Zanzibar | — | Mbaraka Haule |

== Group stage ==
=== Group A ===
| Pos | Team | Pld | W | D | L | GF | GA | GD | Pts | Qualification |
|---|---|---|---|---|---|---|---|---|---|---|
| 1 | Somalia | 3 | 2 | 1 | 0 | 4 | 0 | +4 | 7 | Advance to knockout stage |
| 2 | Kenya | 3 | 1 | 1 | 1 | 4 | 1 | +3 | 4 | Advance to knockout stage |
| 3 | Burundi | 3 | 1 | 1 | 1 | 1 | 4 | −3 | 4 | |
| 4 | Ethiopia | 3 | 0 | 1 | 2 | 0 | 4 | −4 | 1 | |

Rules for classification: Group stage tiebreakers
14 April 2018
15:30

| Burundi | 0–4 | Kenya |

Umuco Stadium, Muyinga
Referee: William Oloya (Uganda)
15 April 2018
15:30

| Ethiopia | 0–3 (Note: Despite a 3-1 win, Ethiopia was forfeited for fielding over age players.) | Somalia |

Ngozi Stadium, Ngozi
Referee: Sabri Mohamed Fadul (Sudan)

17 April 2018
15:00

| Burundi | 0–0 | Somalia |

Ngozi Stadium, Ngozi
Referee: William Oloya (Uganda)
17 April 2018
15:00

| Kenya | 0–0 | Ethiopia |

Ingoma Stadium, Gitega
Attendance: Emmanuel Mwandembwa (Tanzania)

20 April 2018
15:00

| Kenya | 0–1 | Somalia |

Umuco Stadium, Muyinga
Referee: Emmanuel Mwandembwa (Tanzania)
20 April 2018
15:00

| Burundi | 1–0 | Ethiopia |

Ingoma Stadium, Gitega
Referee: Sabri Mohamed Fadul (Sudan)

=== Group B ===
| Pos | Team | Pld | W | D | L | GF | GA | GD | Pts | Qualification |
|---|---|---|---|---|---|---|---|---|---|---|
| 1 | Tanzania | 2 | 1 | 1 | 0 | 7 | 1 | +6 | 4 | Advance to knockout stage |
| 2 | Uganda | 2 | 1 | 1 | 0 | 4 | 1 | +3 | 4 | Advance to knockout stage |
| 3 | Sudan | 2 | 0 | 0 | 2 | 0 | 9 | −9 | 0 | |

Rules for classification: Group stage tiebreakers

Zanzibar team was removed from the tournament for fielding over age players.

15 April 2018
15:30

| Tanzania | 1–1 | Uganda |

Umuco Stadium, Muyinga
Referee: Mohamed Nur Muhdin (Somalia)

18 April 2018
15:00

| Uganda | 3–0 | Sudan |

Ingoma Stadium, Gitega
Referee: Eric Manirakiza (Burundi)

22 April 2018
15:00

| Tanzania | 6–0 | Sudan |

Umuco Stadium, Muyinga
Referee: Israel Mpaima (Kenya)

== Knockout stage ==
In the knockout stages, if a match is level at the end of normal playing time, extra time is played (two periods of 15 minutes each) and followed, if necessary, by a penalty shoot-out to determine the winners.

=== Bracket ===
Semi-finals
25 April – Gitega
Somalia | 1
Uganda | 0
25 April – Muyinga
Tanzania | 2
Kenya | 1

Final
29 April – Gitega
Somalia | 0
Tanzania | 2
Third place play-off
28 April – Ngozi
Uganda | 4
Kenya | 1

=== Semi-finals ===
25 April 2018
15:00

| Somalia | 1–0 | Uganda |

Ingoma Stadium, Gitega
Referee: Eric Manirakiza (Burundi)
25 April 2018
15:00

| Tanzania | 2–1 | Kenya |

Umuco Stadium, Muyinga
Referee: Amanuel Haleselass Worku (Ethiopia)

=== Third place play-off ===
28 April 2018
15:00

| Uganda | 4–1 | Kenya |

Ngozi Stadium, Ngozi
Referee: Mohamed Nur Muhdin (Somalia)

=== Final ===
29 April 2018
15:00

| Somalia | 0–2 | Tanzania |

Ingoma Stadium, Gitega
Referee: Israel Mpaima (Kenya)
