= Kenya national youth football team =

Kenya national youth football team may refer to:

- Kenya national under-20 football team
- Kenya national under-17 football team
