= CECAFA U-17 Championship =

African football competition

- Current season, competition or edition: 2024 CECAFA U-17 Championship
- Sport: Football
- Founded: 2007
- First season: 2007
- Most recent champion: Uganda
- Broadcaster: GTV
- Related competitions: CECAFA Cup; CECAFA Club Cup

The CECAFA U-17 Championship is a football tournament organized by CECAFA. Held annually, it includes national under 17 teams from East and Central Africa.

== Past winners ==
Year	Winners	Scoreline	Finalists	Hosts
2007; Details	Burundi	2-0	Uganda	Burundi
2009^{1} Details	Uganda	2-0	Eritrea	Sudan
2018; Details	Tanzania	2-0	Somalia	Burundi
2018; Details	Uganda	3-1	Ethiopia	Tanzania
2020; Details	Uganda	3-1	Tanzania	Rwanda
2022; Details	Somalia	3-1	South Sudan	Ethiopia
2024; Details	Uganda	2-1	Tanzania	Uganda
2025; Details	Tanzania	3-2	Uganda	Ethiopia
2026; Details	Uganda	0-0 (6-5 P)	Somalia	Rwanda

1: The tournament was to be hosted in 2008 but CECAFA could not raise enough money so the tournament was delayed a year.
