= 2007 CECAFA U-17 Championship =

Tournament details
- Host country: Burundi
- Dates: 18 August – 27 August
- Teams: 7 (from CAF confederations)

Final positions
- Champions: Burundi
- Runners-up: Uganda
- Third place: Kenya
- Fourth place: Rwanda

Tournament statistics
- Matches played: 13
- Goals scored: 48 (3.69 per match)

The 2007 CECAFA U-17 Championship was the first CECAFA U-17 Championship, a football tournament contested by the CAF men's national under-17 teams. All games were played at Bujumbura in Burundi

The final took place on 27 August, between Burundi and Uganda. Burundi won the match 2–0 to claim their first CECAFA U-17 Championship title.

== Teams ==
- Burundi
- Kenya
- Rwanda
- Somalia
- Tanzania
- Uganda
- Zanzibar

== Group stage ==
=== Group A ===
Pos	Team	Pld	W	D	L	GF	GA	GD	Pts	Qualification
1	Burundi	3	2	1	0	10	2	+8	7	Advance to knockout stage
2	Rwanda	3	2	1	0	7	2	+5	7	Advance to knockout stage
3	Tanzania	3	0	1	2	4	9	−5	1	
4	Somalia	3	0	1	2	2	10	−8	1	

Rules for classification: Group stage tiebreakers
18 August 2007

Burundi	3–1	Tanzania

18 August 2007

Rwanda	2–0	Somalia

20 August 2007

Rwanda	4–1	Tanzania

20 August 2007

Burundi	6–0	Somalia

22 August 2007

Burundi	1–1	Rwanda

22 August 2007

Tanzania	2–2	Somalia

=== Group B ===
Pos	Team	Pld	W	D	L	GF	GA	GD	Pts	Qualification
1	Uganda	2	2	0	0	10	1	+9	6	Advance to knockout stage
2	Kenya	2	0	1	1	2	6	−4	1	Advance to knockout stage
3	Zanzibar	2	0	1	1	1	6	−5	1	

Rules for classification: Group stage tiebreakers
19 August 2007

Kenya	1–1	Zanzibar

21 August 2007

Uganda	5–1	Kenya

23 August 2007

Zanzibar	0–5	Uganda

== Knockout stage ==
=== Bracket ===
Semi-finals
25 August
Burundi	2
Kenya	1
25 August
Uganda	3
Rwanda	0

Final
27 August
Burundi	2
Uganda	0
Third place play-off
27 August
Rwanda	2 (3)
Kenya (p)	2 (5)

=== Semi-finals ===
25 August 2007

Burundi	2–0	Kenya

25 August 2007

Uganda	3–0	Rwanda

=== Third place play-off ===
27 August 2007

Rwanda	2–2 (a.e.t.)	Kenya
Penalties
	3–5

=== Final ===
27 August 2007

Burundi	2–0	Uganda
D'Amour 30'; Ngama 64' (pen.)
