= 2020 CECAFA U-17 Championship =

Tournament details
- Host country: Rwanda
- City: Gisenyi
- Dates: 12-22 December 2020
- Teams: 6 (from CAF confederations)
- Venue: 1 (in 1 host city)

Final positions
- Champions: Uganda
- Runners-up: Tanzania
- Third place: Ethiopia
- Fourth place: Djibouti

Tournament statistics
- Matches played: 10
- Goals scored: 32 (3.2 per match)

The 2020 CECAFA U17 Championship was the 4th CECAFA U-17 Championship organized by CECAFA (Council of East and Central Africa Football Association). It took place from 12 to 22 December 2020 in Gisenyi, Rwanda.

This competition also served as the CECAFA qualifiers for the 2021 Africa U-17 Cup of Nations as the two finalists of the tournament represented CECAFA in the CAF U-17 continental competition.

The 6 participating teams were drawn into 2 groups. The winners and the runners-up of each group advanced to the semi-finals.

== Venue ==
- Umuganda Stadium, Gisenyi - Rubavu

== Teams ==
- Rwanda
- Djibouti
- Ethiopia
- Kenya
- Tanzania
- Uganda
- South Sudan - Disqualified

- Burundi - Withdrew
- Sudan - Withdrew
- Eritrea - Withdrew

== Match officials ==
Referees

- Djaffari Nduwimana (Burundi)
- Emmanuel Mwandembwa (Tanzania)
- Sabri Mohamed Fadul (Sudan)
- Tewodros Mitiku (Ethiopia)
- Mohamed Diraneh (Djibouti)
- Omar Abdulkadir Artan (Somalia)
- Israël Mpaima (Kenya)
- Sammuel Uwikunda (Rwanda) (Rwanda)
- (Ms) Shamirah Nabadda (Uganda)
- Ronald Madanda (Uganda)

Assistant Referees

- Emery Niyongabo (Burundi)
- Dieudonne Mutuyimana (Rwanda)
- Abd Elgabar Mohammed (Sudan)
- (South Sudan) Gasim Madir Dehiya (South Sudan)
- Ahmad Abdulahi Farah (Somalia)
- Fasika Yehualashet (Ethiopia)
- Samuel Kuria (Kenya)
- (Ms) Carolyne Kiles (Kenya)
- Frank Komba (Tanzania)
- Hakim Mulindwa (Uganda)
- (Ms) Lydia Nantabo (Uganda)

== Group stage ==
=== Group A ===
Pos	Team	Pld	W	D	L	GF	GA	GD	Pts	Qualification
1	Uganda	2	2	0	0	8	0	+8	6	Semi-finals
2	Ethiopia	2	0	1	1	2	5	−3	1	Semi-finals
3	Kenya	2	0	1	1	2	7	−5	1	

Source: CECAFA
Rules for classification: Group tiebreakers
13 December 2020
16:00

Kenya	2–2	Ethiopia
Gachago 14'; Rajab 84'	Report	Jiru 61'; Nagash 90+4' (pen.)

Umuganda Stadium, Gisenyi
Referee: Djaffari Nduwimana (Burundi)

16 December 2020
12:00

Uganda	5–0	Kenya
Mawa 7' 50' 54'; Mutyaba 77'; Gava 84'	Report

Umuganda Stadium, Gisenyi
Referee: Mohamed Diraneh (Djibouti)

18 December 2020
15:00

Uganda	3–0	Ethiopia
Mawa 17' 63'; Irinimbabazi 35'	Report

Umuganda Stadium, Gisenyi
Referee: Emmanuel Mwandembwa (Tanzania)

=== Group B ===
Pos	Team	Pld	W	D	L	GF	GA	GD	Pts	Qualification
1	Tanzania	2	1	1	0	4	2	+2	4	Semi-finals
2	Djibouti	2	0	2	0	1	1	0	2	Semi-finals
3	Rwanda (H)	2	0	1	1	1	3	−2	1	

Source: CECAFA
Rules for classification: Group tiebreakers
(H) Hosts
14 December 2020
15:30

Rwanda	1–3	Tanzania
Irimhaye 19' (pen.)	Report	Kassimu 10'; Omar Abbas 14' 61'

Umuganda Stadium, Gisenyi
Referee: Sabri Mohamed Fadul (Sudan)

16 December 2020
17:00

Rwanda	0–0	Djibouti
	Report

Umuganda Stadium, Gisenyi
Referee: Tewodros Mitiku (Ethiopia)

18 December 2020
12:00

Djibouti	1–1	Tanzania
Moktar Djama Ali 80'	Report	Mouhoumed 33' (og.)

Umuganda Stadium, Gisenyi
Referee: (Ms) Shamirah Nabadda (Uganda)

== Knockout stage ==
In the knockout stages, if a match is level at the end of normal playing time, extra time is played (two periods of 15 minutes each) and followed, if necessary, by a penalty shoot-out to determine the winners.

Semi-finals
20 December – Umuganda Stadium
Uganda	1
Djibouti	0
20 December – Umuganda Stadium
Tanzania	1 (4)
Ethiopia	1 (3)

Final
22 December – Umuganda Stadium
Uganda	3
Tanzania	1
Third place
22 December – Umuganda Stadium
Ethiopia	5
Djibouti	2

=== Semi-finals ===
Winners qualified for 2021 Africa U-20 Cup of Nations.

20 December 2020
12h00

Uganda	1–0	Djibouti
Mawa 90'	Report

Umuganda Stadium, Gisenyi
Referee: Omar Abdulkadir Artan (Somalia)
20 December 2020
15h00

Tanzania	1–1	Ethiopia
Bakari 37'	Report	Ganta 69'
Penalties
	4-3

Umuganda Stadium, Gisenyi
Referee: Sammuel Uwikunda (Rwanda)

=== 3rd Place match ===
22 December 2020
12h00

Ethiopia	5–2	Djibouti
Bakalo 18' 35'; Jiru 36'; Ramato 59' 72'	Report	Hadi 56'; Mohamed 77'

Umuganda Stadium, Gisenyi
Referee: Djaffari Nduwimana (Burundi)

=== Final ===
22 December 2020
15h00

Tanzania	1–3	Uganda
Mulema 88' (o.g.)	Report	Irinambabazi, 63'; Mutyaba 70'; Juma 90+1' (pen.)

Umuganda Stadium, Gisenyi
Referee: Omar Abdulkadir Artan (Somalia)

== Champion ==
2020 CECAFA U-17 Championship champion

Uganda
2nd title

== Qualification for CAF U17 Cup of Nations ==
The two finalists of the tournament qualified for the 2021 Africa U-17 Cup of Nations.

Qualified nations:

- Uganda
- Tanzania
