= 1993 African U-17 Qualifying for World Cup =

Tournament details
- Teams: 15 (from 1 confederation)

Final positions
- Champions: Ghana; Nigeria; Tunisia

The 1993 African U-17 Qualifying for World Cup was the Confederation of African Football (CAF)'s final qualifier for the FIFA U-17 World Cup. Beginning in 1995, CAF introduced the African U-17 Championship as the new qualification route. The three winners qualified for the 1993 FIFA U-17 World Championship.

== Preliminary round ==
The winners advanced to the first round.

Team 1	Agg.	Team 2	1st leg	2nd leg
Senegal	4–2	Togo	2–2	2–0
Mauritius	w/o	Kenya	—	—
Guinea-Bissau	w/o	Mauritania	—	—

Senegal	2–2	Togo

Togo	0–2	Senegal

Senegal advanced after 4−2 on aggregate.

Mauritius	w/o	Kenya

Mauritius advanced after the withdraw of Kenya.

Guinea-Bissau	w/o	Mauritania

Guinea-Bissau advanced after the withdraw of Mauritania.

== First round ==
The winners advanced to the Final Round.

Team 1	Agg.	Team 2	1st leg	2nd leg
Ghana	4–1	Senegal	2–0	2–1
Nigeria	3–2	Guinea-Bissau	3–0	0–2
Morocco	0–1	Algeria	0–0	0–1
Tunisia	3–0	Mauritius	2–0	1–0
Egypt	w/o	Uganda	—	—
Mali	w/o	Ivory Coast	—	—

Ghana	2–0	Senegal

Senegal	1–2	Ghana

Ghana advanced after 4−1 on aggregate.

Nigeria	3–0	Guinea-Bissau

Guinea-Bissau	2–0	Nigeria

Nigeria advanced after 2−0 on aggregate.

Morocco	0–0	Algeria

Algeria	1–0	Morocco

Algeria advanced after 1−0 on aggregate.

Tunisia	2–0	Mauritius

Mauritius	0–1	Tunisia

Tunisia advanced after 3−0 on aggregate.

Egypt	w/o	Uganda

Egypt advanced after the withdraw of Uganda.

Mali	w/o	Ivory Coast

Mali advanced after the withdraw of Ivory Coast.

== Final round ==
The winners qualified for the 1993 FIFA U-17 World Championship.

Team 1	Agg.	Team 2	1st leg	2nd leg
Ghana	5–0	Egypt	2–0	3–0
Nigeria	6–1	Algeria	2–0	4–1
Tunisia	1–1 (a)	Mali	0–0	1–1

Ghana	2–0	Egypt

Egypt	0–3	Ghana

Ghana qualified after 5−0 on aggregate.

Nigeria	2–0	Algeria

Algeria	1–4	Nigeria

Nigeria qualified after 6−1 on aggregate.

Tunisia	0–0	Mali

Mali	1–1	Tunisia

Tunisia advanced on away goal after 1−1 on aggregate.

== Countries to participate in 1993 FIFA U-17 World Championship ==
The 3 teams which qualified for 1993 FIFA U-17 World Championship.

- Ghana
- Nigeria
- Tunisia
