= Somalia national under-17 football team =

National association football team

Somalia U-17
- Nickname: The Ocean Stars
- Association: Xiriirka Soomaaliyeed ee Kubadda Cagta
- Confederation: CAF (Africa)
- Sub-confederation: CECAFA (Central & East Africa)
- Head coach: (Somalia) Nuur Maxamed
- Captain: Abdulle Abdullahi Abdulle
- Home stadium: Mogadishu Stadium
- FIFA code: SOM
First colours	Second colours

First international
- Somalia 0–1 Angola (Lubango, Angola; 2 March 1997)

Biggest win
- Somalia 3–1 South Sudan (Addis Ababa, Ethiopia; 15 October 2022)

Biggest defeat
- Somalia 0-3 Tunisia (El Jadida, Morocco; 1 April 2025)

CECAFA U-17 Championship
- Appearances: 4 (first in 2007)
- Best result: Champions (2022)

Africa U-17 Cup of Nations
- Appearances: 2 (first in 2023)
- Best result: Group stage (2023, 2025)
Medal record
CECAFA U-17 Championship
Silver medal – second place	2018 Burundi
Gold medal – first place	2022 Ethiopia

The Somalia national under-17 football team (Somali: Kooxda Qaranka Soomaaliya, Arabic: الاتحاد الصومالي لكرة القدم), nicknamed the Ocean Stars, represents Somalia at the age of U-17 levels in international football and is controlled by the Somali Football Federation (SFF), a member of the Confederation of African Football (CAF).

== Team image ==
=== Nicknames ===
The Somalia national under-17 football team has been known or nicknamed as (Somali: Kooxda Qaranka Soomaaliya, Arabic: الاتحاد الصومالي لكرة القدم), the Ocean Stars

=== Home stadium ===
The team play its home matches on the Horseed Stadium and others stadiums.

== History ==
The Somalia national under-17 football team have played their debut game on 2 March 1998 against Angola at Lubanga, Angola which lost by 0–1 goal. The team in 2022 have won 2022 CECAFA U-17 Championship for the first time and they have qualified to the 2023 Africa Cup of Nations in Algeria. The nation yet to qualified in the FIFA U-17 World Cup.

== Current squad ==
The following players were named in the squad for the 2023 U-17 Africa Cup of Nations between 29 April – 19 May.

Caps and goals are correct as of 2 May 2023, after the match against Congo.

No.	Pos.	Player	Date of birth (age)	Caps	Goals	Club
1	GK	Mohamed Adan Osman	1 January 2007 (age 19)	0	0	(Somali Football Federation) Hiliwa
13	GK	Abdikadir Ali	19 May 2006 (age 20)	2	0	(Somali Football Federation) Badbaadbo
23	GK	Jabril Ali	20 March 2007 (age 19)	0	0	(Somali Football Federation) Dalsan
2	DF	Abdulle Abdullahi	3 November 2006 (age 19)	2	0	(Somali Football Federation) Heegan
3	DF	Khalid Ahmed Hassan	9 February 2006 (age 20)	2	0	(Somali Football Federation) Darul Tarbiyah
4	DF	Abdulkadir Osman	10 April 2007 (age 19)	2	0	(Somali Football Federation) Jazira
5	DF	Ayub Hassan	1 February 2007 (age 19)	0	0	(Somali Football Federation) Jabir
12	DF	Hassan Adan Barreh	18 September 2007 (age 19)	0	0	(The Football Association) Leicester City
18	DF	Abdirahman Cama	1 May 2006 (age 20)	2	0	(Somali Football Federation) Heegan
6	MF	Said Mohamed	5 January 2006 (age 20)	1	0	(Somali Football Federation) UMA Hospital
99	MF	Abdalla Omar	8 July 2006 (age 20)	2	0	(Somali Football Federation) Gasco
8	MF	Mahamoud Silva	7 February 2006 (age 20)	2	0	(Somali Football Federation) Gasco
14	MF	Ahmed Hassan Mohamed	6 March 2007 (age 19)	2	0	(Somali Football Federation) Banadir
15	MF	Muhidin Mukhtar	1 October 2007 (age 19)	0	0	(Somali Football Federation) Jabir
20	MF	Idriis Abdiwahab	25 June 2007 (age 19)	2	0	(Swedish Football Association) Uddevalla
9	FW	Abdirahin Mohamed	26 June 2006 (age 20)	1	0	(Somali Football Federation) Gasco
11	FW	Badri Hussein	3 August 2006 (age 20)	2	0	(Somali Football Federation) Woxol
16	FW	Abdirahan Farah	10 February 2007 (age 19)	0	0	(Somali Football Federation) Xamarweyne
17	FW	Yaasiin Abdirahman	23 August 2006 (age 20)	2	0	(Norwegian Football Federation) Lyn
21	FW	Abdiaziiz Abdirahman	3 March 2006 (age 20)	2	0	(Canadian Soccer Association) Toronto

== Fixtures and results ==
Legend

Win Draw Loss Fixture

== Competition records ==
=== FIFA U-17 World Cup ===
FIFA U-17 World Cup Record								
Hosts / Year	Result	Position	GP	W	D*	L	GS	GA
(China) 1985	Did not qualify							
(Canada) 1987	Did not qualify							
(Scotland) 1989	Did not qualify							
(Italy) 1991	Did not qualify							
(Japan) 1993	Did not qualify							
(Ecuador) 1995	Did not qualify							
(Egypt) 1997	Did not qualify							
(New Zealand) 1999	Did not qualify							
(Trinidad and Tobago) 2001	Did not qualify							
(Finland) 2003	Did not qualify							
(Peru) 2005	Did not qualify							
(South Korea) 2007	Did not qualify							
(Nigeria) 2009	Did not qualify							
(Mexico) 2011	Did not qualify							
(United Arab Emirates) 2015	Did not qualify							
(Chile) 2017	Did not qualify							
(Brazil) 2019	Did not qualify							
(Peru) ~~2021~~	Cancelled							
(Indonesia) 2023	Did not qualify							
(Qatar) 2025	Did not qualify							
Total	0/20	–	0	0	0	0	0	0

=== Africa U-17 Cup of Nations ===
Africa U-17 Cup of Nations Record							
Hosts / Year	Result	GP	W	D*	L	GS	GA
(Mali) 1995 to (Tanzania) 2019	Did not qualify						
(Morocco) ~~2021~~	Cancelled						
(Algeria) 2023	Group stage	3	0	1	2	1	6
(Morocco) 2025	Group stage	3	0	0	3	1	10
Total	2/15	6	0	1	5	2	16

=== CECAFA U-17 Championship ===
CECAFA U-17 Championship Record								
Hosts / Year	Result	Position	GP	W	D*	L	GS	GA
(Burundi) 2007	Group stages	–	3	0	1	2	2	10
(South Sudan) 2009	Group stages	–	3	0	0	3	1	5
(Burundi) 2018	Runners-up	–	5	3	1	1	5	2
(Rwanda) 2020	Did not participate							
(Ethiopia) 2022	Champions	–	4	2	1	1	6	4
Total	4/5	–	15	5	3	7	14	21
