= 1991 African U-17 Qualifying for World Cup =

Tournament details
- Teams: 25 (from 1 confederation)

Final positions
- Champions: Congo; Ghana; Sudan

The 1991 African U-17 Qualifying for World Cup was a qualifying edition organized by the Confederation of African Football (CAF) for the FIFA U-17 World Championship. The three winners qualified for the 1991 FIFA U-17 World Championship.

== First round ==
The winner advanced to the Second Round.

Team 1	Agg.	Team 2	1st leg	2nd leg
Togo	w/o	Benin	—	—

Togo	w/o	Benin

Togo advanced after the withdrawal of Benin.

== Second round ==
The winners advanced to the Third Round.

Team 1	Agg.	Team 2	1st leg	2nd leg
Congo	5–1	Togo	4–0	1–1
Algeria	0–1	Mauritania	0–0	0–1
Egypt	1–1 (a)	Tunisia	0–0	1–1
Zimbabwe	0–4	Zambia	0–2	0–2
Uganda	0–2	Sudan	0–1	0–1
Guinea	1–0	Burkina Faso	1–0	0–0
Ghana	3–3 (a)	Sierra Leone	2–0	1–3
Mali	0–1	Senegal	0–1	0–0
Ivory Coast	w/o	Liberia	—	—
Cameroon	w/o	Central African Republic	—	—
Gabon	w/o	Zaire	—	—
Morocco	w/o	Gambia	—	—

Congo	4–0	Togo

Togo	1–1	Congo

Congo advanced after 5−1 on aggregate.

Algeria	0–0	Mauritania

Mauritania	1–0	Algeria

Mauritania advanced after 1−0 on aggregate.

Egypt	0–0	Tunisia

Tunisia	1–1	Egypt

Egypt advanced on away goal after 1−1 on aggregate.

Zimbabwe	0–2	Zambia

Zambia	2–0	Zimbabwe

Zambia advanced after 4−0 on aggregate.

Uganda	0–1	Sudan

Sudan	1–0	Uganda

Sudan advanced after 2−0 on aggregate.

Guinea	1–0	Burkina Faso

Burkina Faso	0–0	Guinea

Guinea advanced after 1−0 on aggregate.

Ghana	2–0	Sierra Leone

Sierra Leone	3–1	Ghana

Ghana advanced on away goal after 3−3 on aggregate.

Mali	0–1	Senegal

Senegal	0–0	Mali

Senegal advanced after 1−0 on aggregate.

Ivory Coast	w/o	Liberia

Ivory Coast advanced after the withdrawal of Liberia.

Cameroon	w/o	Central African Republic

Cameroon advanced after the withdrawal of Central African Republic.

Gabon	w/o	Zaire

Gabon advanced after the withdrawal of Zaire.

Morocco	w/o	Gambia

Morocco advanced after the withdrawal of Gambia.

== Third round ==
The winners advanced to the Fourth Round.

Team 1	Agg.	Team 2	1st leg	2nd leg
Cameroon	0–1	Gabon	0–0	0–1
Zambia	1–3	Sudan	1–0	0–3
Guinea	0–3	Ghana	0–0	0–3
Congo	w/o	Ivory Coast	—	—
Egypt	w/o	Mauritania	—	—
Morocco	w/o	Senegal	—	—

Cameroon	0–0	Gabon

Gabon	1–0	Cameroon

Gabon advanced after 1−0 on aggregate.

Zambia	1–0	Sudan

Sudan	3–0	Zambia

Sudan advanced after 3−1 on aggregate.

Guinea	0–0	Ghana

Ghana	3–0	Guinea

Ghana advanced after 3−0 on aggregate.

Congo	w/o	Ivory Coast

Congo advanced after the withdrawal of Ivory Coast.

Egypt	w/o	Mauritania

Egypt advanced after the withdrawal of Mauritania.

Morocco	w/o	Senegal

Morocco advanced after the withdrawal of Senegal.

== Fourth round ==
The winners qualified for the 1991 FIFA U-17 World Championship.

Team 1	Agg.	Team 2	1st leg	2nd leg
Congo	5–1	Gabon	5–0	0–1
Egypt	0–2	Sudan	0–0	0–2^{1}
Ghana	4–0	Morocco	2–0	2–0^{1}

^1 The second legs were scratched and Sudan and Ghana qualified for the 1991 U-17 FIFA World Cup as Egypt and Morocco were ejected from the competition for using overaged players.

Congo	5–0	Gabon

Gabon	1–0	Congo

Congo qualified after 5−1 on aggregate.

Egypt	0–0	Sudan

Sudan qualified after disqualification of Egypt.

Ghana	2–0	Morocco

Ghana qualified after disqualification of Morocco.

== Countries to participate in 1991 FIFA U-17 World Championship ==
The 3 teams which qualified for 1991 FIFA U-17 World Championship.

- Congo
- Ghana
- Sudan
