= Uganda national under-17 football team =

National association football team

Uganda U-17
- Nickname: The Cubs
- Association: Federation of Uganda Football Associations
- Confederation: CAF (Africa)
- Sub-confederation: CECAFA (East & Central Africa)
- Head coach: (Ghana) Laryea Kingston
- Captain: Gavin Kizito
- Home stadium: Mandela National Stadium
- FIFA code: UGA
First colours	Second colours	Third colours

First international
- Uganda 0–1 South Sudan (Kampala, Uganda; 6 June 1991)

Biggest win
- Djibouti 0–8 Uganda (Dar es Salam, Tanzania; 22 August 2018)

Biggest defeat
- Morocco 5–0 Uganda (Mohammedia, Morocco; 30 March 2025)

U-17 Africa Cup of Nations
- Appearances: 2 (first in 2019)
- Best result: Group stage (2019, 2025)

CECAFA U-17 Championship
- Appearances: 5 (first in 2007)
- Best result: Champions (2018, 2020)

FIFA U-17 World Cup
- Appearances: 2 (first in 2025)
- Best result: Round of 16 (2025)

The Uganda national under-17 football team (nicknamed The Cubs), represents Uganda in men's under-17 international football and is controlled by the Federation of Uganda Football Associations, which is a part of CAF.

== History ==
The Uganda national under-17 scored its first goal in the FIFA U-17 World Cup on 5 November 2025 in Qatar. The Uganda national under-17 football team, known as the Uganda Cubs, recently made history as the first Ugandan team to reach the knockout stages of the FIFA U-17 World Cup in November 2025.

For the first time in history, Uganda secured a victory in a FIFA World Cup match. James Bogere's early goal enabled the Uganda Cubs to surprise France with a 1-0 win and move on to the knockout rounds of the U-17 tournament. It is currently coached by Brain Ssenyondo.

== Breakthrough: 2025 FIFA U-17 World Cup ==
The 2025 FIFA U-17 World Cup in Qatar marked a historic milestone for Ugandan football. On 12 April 2025, Uganda secured qualification for the tournament, the first time any Ugandan team at any level has qualified for a FIFA World Cup event, by defeating The Gambia 2-1 in a playoff following the 2025 CAF U-17 Africa Cup of Nation.

The team's participation galvanized support at home and FUFA organised a homecoming ceremony in Entebe to honour the squad's achievement.

== Style and Impact ==
The Cubs are recognised for their attacking play and tactical discipline. Their recent successes reflect the growth of youth football structures in Uganda and underscore FUFA's focus on long-term development including coaching education, youth competition and international exposure.

== Players ==
The following players were called up for the 2026 U-17 Africa Cup of Nations qualification.

No.	Pos.	Player	Date of birth (age)	Club
1	GK	Adrian Mukwanga	25 May 2010 (age 16)	(Federation of Uganda Football Associations) Vipers SC
18	GK	Edrisah Waibi	28 June 2008 (age 18)	(Federation of Uganda Football Associations) Buddo SS
19	GK	Gilbert Mazige	15 September 2008 (age 18)	(Federation of Uganda Football Associations) NEC
21	DF	Abdul Ntege	1 January 2010 (age 16)	(Federation of Uganda Football Associations) Maroons FC
4	DF	Steven Oyirwoth	24 September 2009 (age 17)	(Federation of Uganda Football Associations) KCCA FC
2	DF	Jovan Mukisa	29 May 2009 (age 17)	(Nigeria Football Federation) Grassrunners FC
16	MF	John Owino	5 September 2009 (age 17)	(Federation of Uganda Football Associations) Express
7	MF	Derick Ssozi	1 June 2008 (age 18)	(Federation of Uganda Football Associations) Fort Portal Taxi Operators
13	MF	Nuweagaba Kamurungi	16 October 2010 (age 16)	(Federation of Uganda Football Associations) Kitara
12	MF	John Asiimwe	15 October 2008 (age 18)	(Federation of Uganda Football Associations) Express
5	MF	Brian Jjara	4 October 2008 (age 18)	(Federation of Uganda Football Associations) KCCA FC
8	MF	Abubakali Walusimbi	27 December 2008 (age 17)	(Federation of Uganda Football Associations) Vipers SC
10	MF	Isima Magala	28 July 2009 (age 17)	(Federation of Uganda Football Associations) Masaka Sunshine
14	FW	Simon Wanyama	20 December 2009 (age 16)	(Federation of Uganda Football Associations) Bukedea Comprehensive
15	FW	Shakur Magogo	15 December 2008 (age 17)	(Federation of Uganda Football Associations) Namilyango College
17	FW	Arafat Nkoola	26 December 2008 (age 17)	(Federation of Uganda Football Associations) Vipers SC
20	FW	Enock Bagenda	9 September 2008 (age 18)	(Federation of Uganda Football Associations) KCCA FC

== Recent results and fixtures ==
The following is a list of match results from the previous 12 months, as well as any future matches that have been scheduled.

Legend

Win Draw Loss Void or Postponed Fixtures

== Competitive records ==
=== FIFA U-17 World Cup ===
Year	Result	Pld	W	D	L	GF	GA
(China) 1985	Did not qualify						
(Canada) 1987	Did not qualify						
(Scotland) 1989	Did not participate						
(Italy) 1991	Withdrew						
(Japan) 1993	Did not qualify						
(Ecuador) 1995	Disqualified						
(Egypt) 1997	Did not qualify						
(New Zealand) 1999	Did not qualify						
(Trinidad and Tobago) 2001	Did not qualify						
(Finland) 2003	Did not qualify						
(Peru) 2005	Did not qualify						
(South Korea) 2007	Did not qualify						
(Nigeria) 2009	Did not qualify						
(Mexico) 2011	Did not qualify						
(United Arab Emirates) 2013	Did not qualify						
(Chile) 2015	Did not qualify						
(India) 2017	Did not qualify						
(Brazil) 2019	Did not qualify						
(Indonesia) 2023	Did not qualify						
(Qatar) 2025	Round of 16	5	2	2	1	5	4
(Qatar) 2026	In progress	1	0	0	1	0	3
(Qatar) 2027	To be determined						
(Qatar) 2028	To be determined						
(Qatar) 2029	To be determined						
Total:2/24	Round of 16	6	2	2	2	5	7

=== U-17 Africa Cup of Nations ===
Year	Round	GP	W	D	L	GS	GA
1985	Did not qualify						
1987	Did not qualify						
1989	Did not participate						
1991	Did not qualify						
1993	Did not qualify						
(Mali) 1995	Did not qualify						
(Botswana) 1997	Did not qualify						
(Guinea) 1999	Did not qualify						
(Seychelles) 2001	Did not qualify						
(Eswatini) 2003	Did not qualify						
(The Gambia) 2005	Did not qualify						
(Togo) 2007	Did not qualify						
(Algeria) 2009	Did not qualify						
(Rwanda) 2011	Did not qualify						
(Morocco) 2013	Did not qualify						
(Niger) 2015	Did not qualify						
(Gabon) 2017	Did not qualify						
(Tanzania) 2019	Group stage	3	1	1	1	4	2
(Algeria) 2023	Did not qualify						
(Morocco) 2025	Group stage	3	1	0	2	4	7
Total	2/20	6	2	1	3	8	9

=== CECAFA U-17 Championship ===
Year	Round	GP	W	D	L	GS	GA
(Burundi) 2007	Runners-up	4	3	0	1	13	3
(Sudan) 2009	Champions	6	6	0	0	13	3
(Burundi) 2018	Third place	4	2	1	1	8	3
(Tanzania) 2019	Champions	6	5	0	1	23	5
(Rwanda) 2020	Champions	4	4	0	0	12	1
(Ethiopia) 2022	Fourth place	4	2	2	0	10	3
(Uganda) 2024	Champions	4	3	1	0	12	3
Total	7/7	32	25	4	3	91	21
