= Brian Ssenyondo =

Ugandan football coach

Personal information
- Date of birth: 23 August 1993 (age 33)
- Place of birth: Fort Portal, Uganda

Team information
- Current team: Kampala Capital City Authority Football Club (co‑coach)

Managerial career
- Years: Team
- 2024: Uganda national football team (National U17 Head Coach)
- 2023–2025: Kitara FC
- 2021–2023: UPDF FC
- 2019: Mbarara City FC
- 2011–2018: Synergy FC

Brian Ssenyondo a.k.a. Coach Muto (born 23 August 1993) is a Ugandan football coach for Uganda national under‑17 football team and co‑coach for Kampala Capital City Authority Football Club.

== Early life and education ==
Brian Ssenyondo was born in Fort Portal, but raised in Masaka, Uganda. He studied from Hope primary School and Masaka Secondary School.

== Coaching education ==
He completed the CAF A Coaching Diploma in 2024.

He holds the CAF B Coaching Diploma Licence.

He holds CAF C Coaching Licence.

== Coaching career ==
Ssenyondos coaching career started in Masaka with Ball Line Academy where he was a player until 2011. In November 2011, He founded Synergy FC and served as its head coach until 2018. He was the head coach of St Johns SS, Kawuga and Uganda Martyrs University. on 1 July 2019, He was appointed as the head coach for Mbarara City FC. From July 2021 to June 2023, Ssenyondo was the head coach for UPDF FC. From 2023 to October 2024, He was the head coach of Kitara FC. In June 2025, Ssenyondo joined KCCA FC as their Co-coach for the senior men's team.

== Achievements and honors ==
2024 Male Coach of the Year.

Pilsner Coach of the month of February 2021.

Pilsner Coach of the month of September 2021.

== See also ==
- Moses Basena
