= 1989 African U-16 Qualifying for World Cup =

Tournament details
- Teams: 21 (from 1 confederation)

Final positions
- Champions: Ghana; Guinea; Nigeria

The 1989 African U-16 Qualifying for World Cup was a qualifying edition organized by the Confederation of African Football (CAF) into the FIFA U-16 World Championship. The three winners qualified for the 1989 FIFA U-16 World Championship.

== First round ==
The first leg matches were played on 2 and 3 July 1988. The second leg matches were played on 16 and 24 July 1988. The winners advanced to the Second round.

Team 1	Agg.	Team 2	1st leg	2nd leg
Tunisia	0–2	Morocco	0–2	0–0
Sierra Leone	2–2 (3–4 p)	Guinea	2–0	0–2
Algeria	w/o	Senegal	—	—
Zambia	w/o	Lesotho	—	—
Mauritius	w/o	Madagascar	—	—
Zaire	w/o	Kenya	—	—
Gabon	w/o	Angola	—	—
Cameroon	w/o	Liberia	—	—
Ghana	w/o	Togo	—	—

2 July 1988

Tunisia	0–2	Morocco

16 July 1988

Morocco	0–0	Tunisia

Morocco advanced after 2−0 on aggregate.

3 July 1988

Sierra Leone	2–0	Guinea

24 July 1988

Guinea	2–0	Sierra Leone
Penalties
	4–3

Guinea advanced after a penalty shootout (4–3) after a draw of 2–2 on aggregate.

Algeria	w/o	Senegal

Algeria advanced after the withdraw of Senegal.

Zambia	w/o	Lesotho

Zambia advanced after the withdraw of Lesotho.

Mauritius	w/o	Madagascar

Mauritius advanced after the withdraw of Madagascar.

Zaire	w/o	Kenya

Zaire advanced after the withdraw of Kenya.

Gabon	w/o	Angola

Gabon advanced after the withdraw of Angola.

Cameroon	w/o	Liberia

Cameroon advanced after the withdraw of Liberia.

Ghana	w/o	Togo

Ghana advanced after the withdraw of Togo.

== Second round ==
The first leg matches were played on 2 and 4 September 1988. The second leg matches were played on 16 and 18 September 1988. The winners advanced to the Third Round.

Team 1	Agg.	Team 2	1st leg	2nd leg
Ghana	2–2 (a)	Cameroon	1–0	1–2
Mauritius	1–14	Zambia	1–5	0–9
Guinea	6–0	Algeria	4–0	2–0
Egypt	2–1	Morocco	2–0	0–1
Nigeria	4–2	Zaire	2–1	2–1
Ivory Coast	w/o	Gabon	—	—

2 September 1988

Ghana	1–0	Cameroon

16 September 1988

Cameroon	2–1	Ghana

Ghana advanced on away goal after 2−2 on aggregate.

2 September 1988

Mauritius	1–5	Zambia

18 September 1988

Zambia	9–0	Mauritius

Zambia advanced after 14−1 on aggregate.

4 September 1988

Guinea	4–0	Algeria

16 September 1988

Algeria	0–2	Guinea

Guinea advanced after 6−0 on aggregate.

4 September 1988

Egypt	2–0	Morocco

16 September 1988

Morocco	1–0	Egypt

Egypt advanced after 2−1 on aggregate.

4 September 1988

Niger	2–1	Zaire

18 September 1988

Zaire	1–2	Nigeria

Nigeria advanced after 4−2 on aggregate.

Ivory Coast	w/o	Gabon

Ivory Coast advanced after the withdraw of Gabon.

== Third round ==
The first leg matches were played on 8 January 1989. The second leg matches were played on 20 January 1989. The winners qualified for the 1989 FIFA U-16 World Championship.

Team 1	Agg.	Team 2	1st leg	2nd leg
Guinea	1–1 (4–3 p)	Egypt	1–0	0–1
Nigeria	5–0	Zambia	2–0	3–0
Ivory Coast	1–3	Ghana	1–1	0–2

8 January 1989

Guinea	1−0	Egypt

20 January 1989

Egypt	1−0	Guinea
Penalties
	3–4

Guinea qualified after a penalty shootout (4–3) after a draw of 1–1 on aggregate.

8 January 1989

Nigeria	2−0	Zambia

20 January 1989

Zambia	0−3	Nigeria

Nigeria qualified after 5−0 on aggregate.

8 January 1989

Ivory Coast	1−1	Ghana

20 January 1989

Ghana	2−0	Ivory Coast

Ghana qualified after 3−1 on aggregate.

== Countries to participate in 1989 FIFA U-16 World Championship ==
The 3 teams which qualified for 1989 FIFA U-16 World Championship.

- Ghana
- Guinea
- Nigeria
