= U-17 Africa Cup of Nations =

Youth association football competition

- Organiser(s): CAF
- Founded: 1995
- Region: Africa
- Teams: 16
- Current champions: Senegal (2nd title)
- Most championships: Cameroon; Gambia; Ghana; Mali; Nigeria; Senegal; (2 titles each)
- Website: Official website
- 2027 U-17 Africa Cup of Nations

The U-17 Africa Cup of Nations, known as the TotalEnergies U-17 Africa Cup of Nations for sponsorship purposes, is an annual youth association football competition organized by the Confederation of African Football (CAF) for its nations consisting of players under the age of 17. It serves as the African qualification tournament for the FIFA U-17 World Cup.

== History ==
In 1985, FIFA created a World Cup tournament for players under 17 years of age, but CAF organized a knock-out home-and-away qualification competition so as to qualify participants there. In 1995, CAF upgraded the competition into a full standalone competition hosted by a country and named it the African U-17 Championship. On 6 August 2015, the CAF Executive Committee decided to change the tournament's name to the Africa U-17 Cup of Nations. The tournament's name on its official logo after the announcement was however depicted as the U-17 Africa Cup of Nations in line with the senior version, the Africa Cup of Nations.

On 21 July 2016, French energy and petroleum giant TotalEnergies (formerly Total S.A) secured an 8-year sponsorship package from CAF to support its competitions.

Beginning with the 2023 edition, the tournament will be contested by 12 teams. It would have been in effect from the 2021 edition, but that was cancelled by CAF due to the COVID-19 pandemic in Africa and its impact.

== Results ==
=== African U-16 Qualifying for World Cup ===
| Edition | Year | Host | Qualifier teams | | |
| Edition | Year | Host | Winner | Winner | Winner |
|---|---|---|---|---|---|
| 1 | 1985 | Home sites | Congo | Guinea | Nigeria |
| 2 | 1987 | Home sites | Ivory Coast | Egypt | Nigeria |
| 3 | 1989 | Home sites | Nigeria | Ghana | Guinea |

=== African U-17 Qualifying for World Cup ===
| Edition | Year | Host | Qualifier teams | | |
| Edition | Year | Host | Winner | Winner | Winner |
|---|---|---|---|---|---|
| 4 | 1991 | Home sites | Ghana | Congo | Sudan |
| 5 | 1993 | Home sites | Ghana | Nigeria | Tunisia |

=== African U-17 Championship ===
| Edition | Year | Host | Final | | | Third Place Match | | |
| Edition | Year | Host | Winner | Score | Runner-up | Third Place | Score | Fourth Place |
|---|---|---|---|---|---|---|---|---|
| 6 | 1995 | Mali | Ghana | 3–1 (a.e.t.) | Nigeria | Guinea | 2–1 (a.e.t.) | Mali |
| 7 | 1997 | Botswana | Egypt | 1–0 | Mali | Ghana | 1–0 | Ethiopia |
| 8 | 1999 | Guinea | Ghana | 3–1 | Burkina Faso | Mali | 1–0 | Cameroon |
| 9 | 2001 | Seychelles | Nigeria | 3–0 | Burkina Faso | Mali | – | Vacant (Note: The 4th place was declared vacant after Guinea were disqualified following the suspension of its football association by FIFA due to government interference.) |
| 10 | 2003 | Swaziland | Cameroon | 1–0 (a.e.t.) | Sierra Leone | Nigeria | 3–1 | Egypt |
| 11 | 2005 | Gambia | Gambia | 1–0 | Ghana | Ivory Coast | 1–0 | South Africa |
| 12 | 2007 | Togo | Nigeria | 1–0 (a.e.t.) | Togo | Ghana | 1–0 | Tunisia |
| 13 | 2009 | Algeria | Gambia | 3–1 | Algeria | Burkina Faso | 2–0 | Malawi |
| 14 | 2011 | Rwanda | Burkina Faso | 2–1 | Rwanda | Congo | 2–1 | Ivory Coast |
| 15 | 2013 | Morocco | Ivory Coast | 1–1 (5–4 p) | Nigeria | Tunisia | 1–1 (a.e.t.) (11–10 p) | Morocco |
| 16 | 2015 | Niger | Mali | 2–0 | South Africa | Guinea | 3–1 | Nigeria |

=== U-17 Africa Cup of Nations ===
| Edition | Year | Host | Final | | | Third Place Match | | |
| Edition | Year | Host | Winner | Score | Runner-up | Third Place | Score | Fourth Place |
|---|---|---|---|---|---|---|---|---|
| 17 | 2017 | Gabon (Note: Originally set to be hosted by Madagascar.) | Mali | 1–0 | Ghana | Guinea | 3–1 | Niger |
| 18 | 2019 | Tanzania | Cameroon | 0–0 (5–3 p) | Guinea | Angola | 2–1 | Nigeria |
| — | 2021 | Morocco | Canceled due to the COVID-19 pandemic in Africa | | | Canceled due to the COVID-19 pandemic in Africa | | |
| 19 | 2023 | Algeria | Senegal | 2–1 | Morocco | Burkina Faso | 2–1 | Mali |
| 20 | 2025 | Morocco | Morocco | 0–0 (4–2 p) | Mali | Ivory Coast | 1–1 (4–1 p) | Burkina Faso |
| 21 | 2026 | Morocco | Senegal | 1–1 (4–2 p) | Tanzania | Egypt | 2–0 | Morocco |
| 22 | 2027 | Morocco | | | | | | |

== Performances by country ==
| Team | Champions | Runners-up | Third-place | Fourth-place |
|---|---|---|---|---|
| Mali | 2 (2015, 2017) | 2 (1997, 2025) | 2 (1999, 2001) | 2 (1995*, 2023) |
| Ghana | 2 (1995, 1999) | 2 (2005, 2017) | 2 (1997, 2007) | – |
| Nigeria | 2 (2001, 2007) | 2 (1995, 2013) | 1 (2003) | 2 (2015, 2019) |
| Cameroon | 2 (2003, 2019) | – | – | 1 (1999) |
| Gambia | 2 (2005*, 2009) | – | – | – |
| Senegal | 2 (2023, 2026) | – | – | – |
| Burkina Faso | 1 (2011) | 2 (1999, 2001) | 2 (2009, 2023) | 1 (2025) |
| Morocco | 1 (2025*) | 1 (2023) | – | 2 (2013, 2026) |
| Ivory Coast | 1 (2013) | – | 2 (2005, 2025) | 1 (2011) |
| Egypt | 1 (1997) | – | 1 (2026) | 1 (2003) |
| Guinea | – | 1 (2019) | 3 (1995, 2015, 2017) | – |
| South Africa | – | 1 (2015) | – | 1 (2005) |
| Sierra Leone | – | 1 (2003) | – | – |
| Togo | – | 1 (2007*) | – | – |
| Algeria | – | 1 (2009*) | – | – |
| Rwanda | – | 1 (2011*) | – | – |
| Tanzania | – | 1 (2026) | – | – |
| Tunisia | – | – | 1 (2013) | 1 (2007) |
| Congo | – | – | 1 (2011) | – |
| Angola | – | – | 1 (2019) | – |
| Ethiopia | – | – | – | 1 (1997) |
| Malawi | – | – | – | 1 (2009) |
| Niger | – | – | – | 1 (2017) |

* = As hosts

Note: no 4th-place finish in 2001 due to Guinea's disqualification.

== Champions by region ==
| Regional federation | Champion(s) | Title(s) |
|---|---|---|
| WAFU (West Africa) | Mali (2), Ghana (2), Nigeria (2), Gambia (2), Burkina Faso (1), Ivory Coast (1), Senegal (1) | 11 |
| UNAF (North Africa) | Morocco (1), Egypt (1) | 2 |
| UNIFFAC (Central Africa) | Cameroon (2) | 2 |
| COSAFA (Southern Africa) | - | 0 |
| CECAFA (East Africa) | - | 0 |

== Participating nations ==
| Team | (Mali) 1995 | (Botswana) 1997 | (Guinea) 1999 | (Seychelles) 2001 | (Eswatini) 2003 | (The Gambia) 2005 | (Togo) 2007 | (Algeria) 2009 | (Rwanda) 2011 | (Morocco) 2013 | (Niger) 2015 | (Gabon) 2017 | (Tanzania) 2019 | (Algeria) 2023 | (Morocco) 2025 | (Morocco) 2026 | Years |
|---|---|---|---|---|---|---|---|---|---|---|---|---|---|---|---|---|---|
| Algeria | • | • | • | × | • | × | • | 2nd | • | • | × | • | • | QF | • | QF | 3 |
| Angola | • | GS | GS | • | • | • | • | • | • | • | • | GS | 3rd | × | GS | GS | 6 |
| Botswana | GS | GS | • | • | • | • | • | • | × | GS | • | • | • | • | • | • | 3 |
| Burkina Faso | × | • | 2nd | 2nd | • | GS | GS | 3rd | 1st | • | • | • | • | 3rd | 4th | • | 8 |
| Cameroon | × | × | 4th | GS | 1st | • | • | GS | • | • | GS | GS | 1st | GS | GS | QF | 10 |
| Central African Republic | × | × | × | × | × | • | • | × | × | × | × | × | • | • | GS | • | 1 |
| Congo | × | × | × | × | × | • | × | × | 3rd | GS | • | | • | QF | × | × | 3 |
| DR Congo | × | × | × | × | × | × | × | × | • | × | • | × | • | × | × | GS | 1 |
| Egypt | • | 1st | • | × | 4th | × | • | × | GS | × | • | • | × | • | GS | 3rd | 5 |
| Eritrea | × | × | × | • | • | • | GS | • | × | × | × | × | × | × | × | × | 1 |
| Eswatini | × | × | • | • | GS | × | × | × | × | × | × | × | • | × | • | • | 1 |
| Ethiopia | × | 4th | • | GS | GS | • | • | × | • | • | • | • | • | • | × | GS | 4 |
| Gabon | × | × | • | × | • | × | GS | • | • | GS | • | GS | × | × | • | • | 3 |
| Gambia | × | × | × | • | GS | 1st | • | 1st | GS | • | • | × | • | × | GS | • | 5 |
| Ghana | 1st | 3rd | 1st | • | • | 2nd | 3rd | • | • | GS | | 2nd | • | • | • | GS | 8 |
| Guinea | 3rd | • | GS | | GS | • | • | GS | • | • | 3rd | 3rd | 2nd | × | × | • | 7 |
| Ivory Coast | • | GS | • | × | • | 3rd | • | • | 4th | 1st | GS | • | • | • | 3rd | QF | 7 |
| Malawi | • | × | • | • | • | × | • | 4th | × | • | × | × | • | • | • | • | 1 |
| Mali | 4th | 2nd | 3rd | 3rd | • | GS | • | • | GS | • | 1st | 1st | • | 4th | 2nd | QF | 11 |
| Morocco | • | • | • | • | • | • | • | × | • | 4th | • | • | GS | 2nd | 1st | 4th | 5 |
| Mozambique | GS | × | × | GS | • | • | • | • | • | • | • | • | • | • | • | GS | 3 |
| Niger | × | × | × | × | × | × | × | | × | • | GS | 4th | • | • | • | • | 2 |
| Nigeria | 2nd | • | GS | 1st | 3rd | GS | 1st | • | • | 2nd | 4th | • | 4th | QF | • | • | 10 |
| Rwanda | × | × | × | • | × | • | • | • | 2nd | • | • | × | • | × | × | • | 1 |
| Senegal | × | × | • | • | • | • | • | × | GS | • | • | • | GS | 1st | QF | 1st | 5 |
| Seychelles | × | × | × | GS | × | × | × | • | × | × | • | • | • | • | × | × | 1 |
| Sierra Leone | • | • | × | • | 2nd | • | × | • | • | × | × | × | • | • | • | • | 1 |
| Somalia | × | • | × | • | • | × | • | × | • | • | × | × | × | GS | GS | • | 2 |
| South Africa | • | • | • | • | • | 4th | GS | • | • | • | 2nd | • | • | QF | QF | GS | 6 |
| South Sudan | Country didn't exist: part of Sudan | | | | | | | | | × | × | × | • | | • | • | 0 |
| Sudan | GS | × | × | • | × | • | • | • | • | × | • | • | • | × | • | • | 1 |
| Tanzania | • | × | × | • | • | | × | × | × | • | • | GS | GS | • | GS | 2nd | 4 |
| Togo | • | × | • | × | × | × | 2nd | × | × | × | • | × | • | • | • | • | 1 |
| Tunisia | GS | • | • | • | • | • | 4th | • | • | 3rd | • | • | • | • | QF | GS | 5 |
| Uganda | × | × | × | × | × | × | × | × | × | × | • | × | GS | • | GS | GS | 3 |
| Zambia | | × | • | • | • | × | • | • | • | • | GS | • | • | GS | QF | • | 3 |
| Zimbabwe | • | GS | GS | • | • | GS | • | GS | × | × | × | × | • | × | • | • | 4 |

Legend

- 1st – Champions
- 2nd – Runners-up
- 3rd – Third place
- 4th – Fourth place
- QF – Quarter-finals
- GS – Group stage
- Q – Qualified for upcoming tournament edition
- — Hosts
- × – Did not enter
- • – Did not qualify
- × – Withdrew before qualification/Banned
- — Withdrew after qualification
- — Disqualified after qualification

== FIFA U-17 World Cup qualifications ==
| Team | (China) 1985 | (Canada) 1987 | (Scotland) 1989 | (Italy) 1991 | (Japan) 1993 | (Ecuador) 1995 | (Egypt) 1997 | (New Zealand) 1999 | (Trinidad and Tobago) 2001 | (Finland) 2003 | (Peru) 2005 | (South Korea) 2007 | (Nigeria) 2009 | (Mexico) 2011 | (United Arab Emirates) 2013 | (Chile) 2015 | (India) 2017 | (Brazil) 2019 | (Indonesia) 2023 | (Qatar) 2025 | (Qatar) 2026 | Total |
|---|---|---|---|---|---|---|---|---|---|---|---|---|---|---|---|---|---|---|---|---|---|---|
| Algeria | | | | | | | | | | | | | R1 | | | | | | | | | 1 |
| Angola | | | | | | | | | | | | | | | | | | R2 | | | | 1 |
| Burkina Faso | | | | | | | | R1 | 3rd | | | | R2 | R1 | | | | | R1 | QF | | 6 |
| Cameroon | | | | | | | | | | R1 | | | | | | | | R1 | | | | 2 |
| Congo | R1 | | | R1 | | | | | | | | | | R2 | | | | | | | | 3 |
| Egypt | | R1 | | | | | QF | | | | | | | | | | | | | R32 | | 2 |
| Gambia | | | | | | | | | | | R1 | | R1 | | | | | | | | | 2 |
| Ghana | | | R1 | 1st | 2nd | 1st | 2nd | 3rd | | | R1 | 4th | | | | | QF | | | | | 9 |
| Guinea | 4th | | R1 | | | R1 | | | | | | | | | | R1 | R1 | | | | | 5 |
| Ivory Coast | | 3rd | | | | | | | | | R1 | | | R2 | QF | | | | | GS | | 5 |
| Malawi | | | | | | | | | | | | | R1 | | | | | | | | | 1 |
| Mali | | | | | | | QF | R1 | QF | | | | | | | 2nd | 4th | | 3rd | R16 | | 7 |
| Morocco | | | | | | | | | | | | | | | R2 | | | | QF | QF | | 3 |
| Niger | | | | | | | | | | | | | | | | | R2 | | | | | 1 |
| Nigeria | 1st | 2nd | QF | | 1st | QF | | | 2nd | R1 | | 1st | 2nd | | 1st | 1st | | R2 | | | | 12 |
| Rwanda | | | | | | | | | | | | | | R1 | | | | | | | | 1 |
| Senegal | | | | | | | | | | | | | | | | | | R2 | R2 | R32 | | 3 |
| Sierra Leone | | | | | | | | | | R1 | | | | | | | | | | | | 1 |
| South Africa | | | | | | | | | | | | | | | | R1 | | | | R32 | | 2 |
| Sudan | | | | R1 | | | | | | | | | | | | | | | | | | 1 |
| Togo | | | | | | | | | | | | R1 | | | | | | | | | | 1 |
| Tunisia | | | | | R1 | | | | | | | R2 | | | R2 | | | | | R32 | | 4 |
| Uganda | | | | | | | | | | | | | | | | | | | | R16 | | 1 |
| Zambia | | | | | | | | | | | | | | | | | | | | R32 | | 1 |

Legend

- 1st – Champions
- 2nd – Runners-up
- 3rd – Third place
- 4th – Fourth place
- QF – Quarterfinals
- R2 – Round 2
- R1 – Round 1
- – Hosts
- Q – Qualified for upcoming tournament

== See also ==
- Africa Cup of Nations
- U-23 Africa Cup of Nations
- U-20 Africa Cup of Nations
- FIFA U-17 World Cup
