= Sierra Leone national under-17 football team =

National under-17 association football team representing Sierra Leone

Sierra Leone U-17
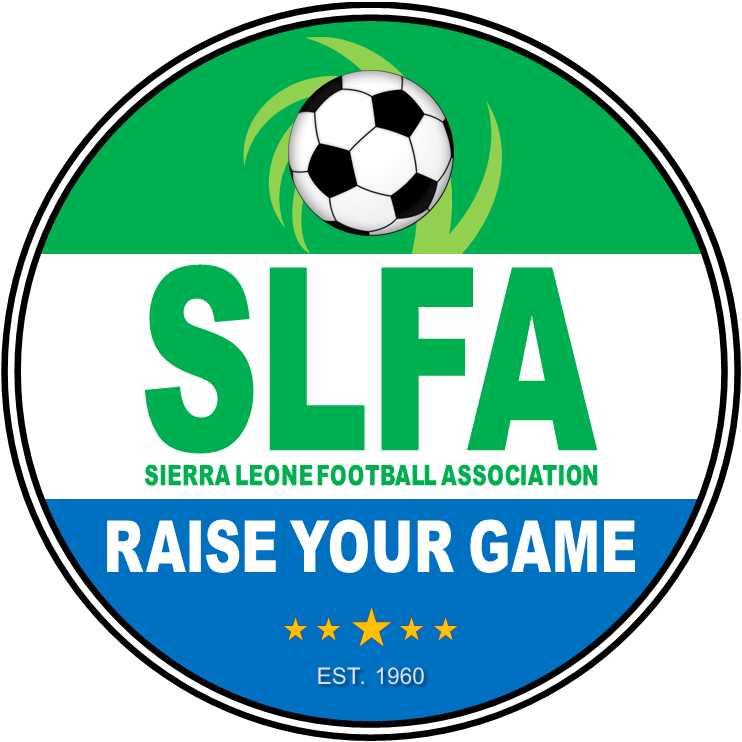
- Association: SLFA
- Confederation: CAF (Africa)
- Head coach: Abdulai Mansaray
- Captain: Mohamed Ibrahim Turay
- FIFA code: SLE
First colours	Second colours

Africa U-17 Cup of Nations
- Appearances: 1 (first in 2003)
- Best result: Runners-up (2003)

FIFA U-17 World Cup
- Appearances: 1 (first in 2003)
- Best result: Group stage (2003)

The Sierra Leone national under-17 football team is the national under-17 football team of Sierra Leone and is controlled by the Sierra Leone Football Association.

== Competitive record ==
=== FIFA U-17 World Cup record ===
FIFA U-17 World Cup Record
Hosts/Year	Round	GP	W	D	L	GS	GA
(China) 1985	Did not enter						
(Canada) 1987	Did not enter						
(Scotland) 1989	Did not qualify						
(Italy) 1991	Did not qualify						
(Japan) 1993	Did not enter						
(Ecuador) 1995	Did not qualify						
(Egypt) 1997	Did not qualify						
(New Zealand) 1999	Did not enter						
(Trinidad and Tobago) 2001	Did not qualify						
(Finland) 2003	Group stage	3	0	1	2	6	8
(Peru) 2005	Did not qualify						
(South Korea) 2007	Withdrew						
(Nigeria) 2009	Did not qualify						
(Mexico) 2011	Did not qualify						
(United Arab Emirates) 2013	Withdrew						
(Chile) 2015	Withdrew						
(India) 2017	Withdrew						
(Brazil) 2019	Did not qualify						
(Indonesia) 2023	Did not qualify						
(Qatar) 2025	Did not qualify						
Total	1/21	3	0	1	2	6	8

=== Africa U-17 Cup of Nations record ===
African U-17 Championship
Hosts/Year	Round	GP	W	D	L	GS	GA
(Mali) 1995	Did not qualify						
(Botswana) 1997	Did not qualify						
(Guinea) 1999	Did not enter						
(Seychelles) 2001	Did not qualify						
(Eswatini) 2003	Runners-up	5	2	2	1	6	4
(The Gambia) 2005	Did not qualify						
(Togo) 2007	Withdrew						
(Algeria) 2009	Did not qualify						
(Rwanda) 2011	Did not qualify						
(Morocco) 2013	Withdrew						
(Niger) 2015	Withdrew						
(Gabon) 2017	Withdrew						
(Tanzania) 2019	Did not qualify						
(Algeria) 2023	Did not qualify						
(Morocco) 2025	Did not qualify						
Total	1/15	5	2	2	1	6	4

=== CAF U-16 and U-17 World Cup Qualifiers record ===
CAF U-16 and U-17 World Cup Qualifiers
Appearances: 2
Year	Round	Position	Pld	W	D	L	GF	GA
1985	Did not enter							
1987	Did not enter							
1989	First Round		2	1	0	1	2	2
1991	Second Round		2	1	0	1	3	3
1993	Did not enter							
Total	Second Round	2/5	4	2	0	2	5	5

== Head-to-head record ==
The following table shows Sierra Leone's head-to-head record in the FIFA U-17 World Cup.

Opponent	Pld	W	D	L	GF	GA	GD	Win %
South Korea	1	0	0	1	2	3	−1	0.00
Spain	1	0	1	0	3	3	+0	0.00
United States	1	0	0	1	1	2	−1	0.00
Total	3	0	1	2	6	8	−2	0.00
