= Malawi national under-17 football team =

National under-17 association football team representing Malawi

Malawi U-17
- Nickname: The Flames
- Association: Football Association of Malawi
- Confederation: CAF (Africa)
- Sub-confederation: COSAFA (Southern Africa)
- Home stadium: Bingu National Stadium
First colours	Second colours	Third colours

U-17 Africa Cup of Nations
- Appearances: 1 (first in 2009)
- Best result: Fourth place (2009)

FIFA U-17 World Cup
- Appearances: 1 (first in 2009)
- Best result: Group Stage (2009)

The Malawi national under-17 football team, nicknamed the Flames, represents the Malawi in international youth football competitions. Its primary role is the development of players in preparation for the senior national team. The team competes in a variety of competitions, including the biennial FIFA U-17 World Cup and the U-17 Africa Cup of Nations, which is the top competitions for this age group.

== Current squad ==
- The following players were called up for the 2023 U-17 Africa Cup of Nations qualification matches.
- Match dates: 2, 4, 6 and 9 December 2022
- Opposition: Botswana, Namibia, Angola and South Africa.

No.	Pos.	Player	Date of birth (age)	Club
	GK	Julius Banda		
	GK	Shabiru Muhammad		
	GK	Raheem Chimwaza		
	DF	Washari Jaziya		
	DF	Misheck Jere		
	DF	Gannet Kamwambe		
	DF	Hermace Masinja		
	DF	Charles Matanda		
	DF	Elias Muywanga		
	DF	Comfort Unyolo		
	MF	Misheck Billiat		
	MF	Holyce Chuzu		
	MF	Modrick Kambendera		
	MF	Blessings Kanowa		
	MF	Dominic Kayamba		
	MF	Mphatso Likhunya		
	MF	Mwisho Mhamgo		
	FW	Vincent Harrison		
	FW	Lucky Mkandawire		
	FW	Webster Nzunda		

== Competitive record ==
=== FIFA U-16 and U-17 World Cup record ===
FIFA U-16 and U-17 World Cup
Year	Round	GP	W	D^{1}	L	GS	GA
(China) 1985	Did not enter						
(Canada) 1987	Did not enter						
(Scotland) 1989	Did not enter						
(Italy) 1991	Did not enter						
(Japan) 1993	Did not enter						
(Ecuador) 1995	Did not qualify						
(Egypt) 1997	Did not enter						
(New Zealand) 1999	Did not qualify						
(Trinidad and Tobago) 2001	Did not qualify						
(Finland) 2003	Did not qualify						
(Peru) 2005	Did not enter						
(South Korea) 2007	Did not qualify						
(Nigeria) 2009	Group stage	3	0	0	3	1	7
(Mexico) 2011	Did not enter						
(United Arab Emirates) 2013	Did not qualify						
(Chile) 2015	Did not enter						
(India) 2017	Withdrew						
(Brazil) 2019	Did not qualify						
(Indonesia) 2023	Did not qualify						
(Qatar) 2025	Did not qualify						
(Qatar) 2026	Did not qualify						
Total	Group stage	3	0	0	3	1	7

^{1}Draws include knockout matches decided on penalty kicks.

=== U-17 Africa Cup of Nations record ===
U-17 Africa Cup of Nations
Year	Round	GP	W	D^{1}	L	GS	GA
(Mali) 1995	Did not qualify						
(Botswana) 1997	Did not enter						
(Guinea) 1999	Did not qualify						
(Seychelles) 2001	Did not qualify						
(Eswatini) 2003	Did not qualify						
(The Gambia) 2005	Did not enter						
(Togo) 2007	Did not qualify						
(Algeria) 2009	Fourth place	4	1	0	3	7	9
(Rwanda) 2011	Did not enter						
(Morocco) 2013	Did not qualify						
(Niger) 2015	Did not enter						
(Gabon) 2017	Withdrew						
(Tanzania) 2019	Did not qualify						
(Algeria) 2023	Did not qualify						
(Morocco) 2025	Did not qualify						
Total	Fourth place	4	1	0	3	7	9

^{1}Draws include knockout matches decided on penalty kicks.

== See also ==
- Malawi national football team
- Malawi national under-20 football team
