= 2021 FIFA U-17 World Cup =

Copa Mundial de la FIFA Sub-17 de 2021

Tournament details
- Host country: Peru
- Dates: Cancelled
- Teams: 24 (from 6 confederations)
- Venue: 6 (in 6 host cities)

The 2021 FIFA U-17 World Cup should have been the 19th edition of the FIFA U-17 World Cup, the biennial international men's youth football championship contested by the under-17 national teams of the member associations of FIFA. It would have been hosted by Peru.

Brazil were the defending champions.

Due to the COVID-19 pandemic, the tournament was cancelled on 24 December 2020. Peru was then awarded the right to host the subsequent FIFA U-17 World Cup instead, a right later given to Indonesia.

== Host selection ==
Peru were announced as hosts following the FIFA Council meeting on 24 October 2019 in Shanghai, China. They were also one of the bidders to host the 2021 FIFA U-20 World Cup, which was awarded to Indonesia on the same day in exchange for Peru's right to host the U-17 competition.

Peru had previously hosted the tournament in 2005. They were also initially awarded hosting rights of the previous edition in 2019, but were stripped by FIFA in February 2019 after inspection of their facilities.

== Venues ==
Peruvian Football Federation had proposed five venues in five host cities.

Piura	2021 FIFA U-17 World Cup is located in Peru
Estadio Miguel Grau; Capacity: 26,550	2021 FIFA U-17 World Cup is located in Peru
Chiclayo	2021 FIFA U-17 World Cup is located in Peru
Estadio Elías Aguirre; Capacity: 25,000	2021 FIFA U-17 World Cup is located in Peru
Trujillo	2021 FIFA U-17 World Cup is located in Peru
Estadio Mansiche; Capacity: 23,214	2021 FIFA U-17 World Cup is located in Peru
Lima	Moquegua
Estadio Nacional; Capacity: 43,000	Estadio 25 de Noviembre; Capacity: 21,000
