= Tanzania national under-17 football team =

Men's national association football team representing Tanzania

Tanzania U-17
- Nickname: Serengeti boys
- Association: Tanzania Football Federation
- Confederation: CAF (Africa)
- Sub-confederation: CECAFA (East & Central Africa)
- Head coach: (Tanzania) Oscar Mirambo
- Captain: Morice Micheal
- Home stadium: National Stadium
- FIFA code: TAN
First colours	Second colours	Third colours

First international
- Tanzania 0–2 Guinea (Dar es Salaam, Tanzania; 18 May 1995)

Biggest win
- Tanzania 11–0 Djibouti (Dire Dawa, Ethiopia; 18 November 2025)

Biggest defeat
- Tanzania 4–5 Nigeria (Dar es Salaam, Tanzania; 14 April 2019)

U-17 Africa Cup of Nations
- Appearances: 4 (first in 2017)
- Best result: (silver) Runners-Up (2026)

CECAFA U-17 Championship
- Appearances: 5 (first in 2007)
- Best result: Champions (2018)

FIFA U-17 World Cup
- Appearances: 1 (first in 2026)

The Tanzania national under-17 football team (Swahili: Timu ya Taifa ya Mpira wa Miguu ya Tanzania) represents Tanzania in youth men's international football and is controlled by the Tanzania Football Federation, the governing body for football in Tanzania, Tanzania's home ground is Benjamin Mkapa National Stadium in Dar-es-Salaam.

== Players ==
The current squad were called up for the 2026 U-17 Africa Cup of Nations qualification.

No.	Pos.	Player	Date of birth (age)	Club
1	GK	Abraham Vuai Nassoro	21 June 2009 (age 17)	(Tanzania Football Federation) Azam FC
22	GK	Ahmedi Shaha Juma	10 May 2010 (age 16)	
14	DF	Idrisa Kasim Kilendemo	25 May 2009 (age 17)	
15	DF	Khamis Haji Mbarouk	12 February 2010 (age 16)	
24	DF	Nhingo Luzelenga	17 August 2009 (age 17)	
4	DF	Abdulnassir Mohamed Makarani	23 March 2009 (age 17)	(Zanzibar Football Federation) Mlandege
5	DF	Hussein Ally Mbegu	11 June 2010 (age 16)	
12	DF	Elick Shaban Yusuph	15 November 2010 (age 16)	
3	DF	Kassim Selemani Juma	20 June 2009 (age 17)	
6	MF	Akram Kassim Shaaban	13 July 2009 (age 17)	
16	MF	Ismail Issa Likungilo	17 January 2010 (age 16)	
19	MF	Hamis Mihambo	10 May 2009 (age 17)	
20	MF	Hasan Mussa Kizinga	30 December 2009 (age 16)	
21	MF	Hansgally Gasto Lipumula	11 July 2009 (age 17)	
8	MF	Issa Mussa Chole	5 May 2010 (age 16)	
11	MF	Razaki Juma Mbegelendi	7 July 2009 (age 17)	
17	FW	Jabiri Abdallah Farijala	17 January 2010 (age 16)	
10	FW	Juma Issa Abushiri	20 May 2008 (age 18)	
7	FW	Ramadhani Kabangwa	12 November 2008 (age 18)	
9	FW	Juma Mwita Sagwe	7 September 2009 (age 17)	(Tanzania Football Federation) KMC
18	FW	Saleh Mahsen Ally	19 November 2008 (age 18)	
26	FW	Abel Josiah Samson	4 November 2010 (age 16)	(Tanzania Football Federation) JKT Tanzania

== Recent results & fixtures ==
The following is a list of match results from the previous 12 months, as well as any future matches that have been scheduled.

Legend

Win Draw Loss Void or Postponed Fixtures

== Competitive record ==
=== FIFA U-16 and U-17 World Cup record ===
FIFA U-16 and U-17 World Cup
Year	Round	GP	W	D^{1}	L	GS	GA
(China) 1985	Did not qualify						
(Canada) 1987	Did not qualify						
(Scotland) 1989	Did not qualify						
(Italy) 1991	Withdrew						
(Japan) 1993	Did not qualify						
(Ecuador) 1995	Did not qualify						
(Egypt) 1997	Did not qualify						
(New Zealand) 1999	Did not qualify						
(Trinidad and Tobago) 2001	Did not qualify						
(Finland) 2003	Did not qualify						
(Peru) 2005	Did not qualify						
(South Korea) 2007	Did not qualify						
(Nigeria) 2009	Did not qualify						
(Mexico) 2011	Did not qualify						
(United Arab Emirates) 2013	Did not qualify						
(Chile) 2015	Did not qualify						
(India) 2017	Did not qualify						
(Brazil) 2019	Did not qualify						
(Indonesia) 2023	Did not qualify						
(Qatar) 2025	Did not qualify						
(Qatar) 2026	In progress	1	0	1	0	2	2
Total:1/21	TBD	1	0	1	0	2	2

^{1}Draws include knockout matches decided on penalty kicks.

=== U-17 Africa Cup of Nations record ===
U-17 Africa Cup of Nations
Year	Round	GP	W	D*	L	GS	GA
(Mali) 1995	Did not qualify						
(Botswana) 1997	Did not qualify						
(Guinea) 1999	Did not qualify						
(Seychelles) 2001	Did not qualify						
(Eswatini) 2003	Did not qualify						
(The Gambia) 2005	Did not qualify						
(Togo) 2007	Did not qualify						
(Algeria) 2009	Did not qualify						
(Rwanda) 2011	Did not qualify						
(Morocco) 2013	Did not qualify						
(Niger) 2015	Did not qualify						
(Gabon) 2017	Group stage	3	1	1	1	2	2
(Tanzania) 2019	Group stage	3	0	0	3	6	12
(Algeria) 2023	Did not qualify						
(Morocco) 2025	Group stage	3	0	0	3	1	10
(Morocco) 2026	Qualifed						
Total	4/15	9	1	1	7	9	24

=== CECAFA U-17 Championship ===
Year	Round	GP	W	D	L	GS	GA	GD
(Burundi) 2007	Group stage	3	-	1	2	4	9	-5
(Sudan) 2009	Third-place	5	4	1	-	7	4	+3
(Burundi) 2018	Champions	4	3	1	-	11	2	+9
(Tanzania) 2019	Third-place	5	4	-	1	14	6	+8
(Rwanda) 2020	Runners-up	4	2	1	1	6	6	0
Total	5/5	21	13	4	4	42	27	+15
