= Togo national under-17 football team =

National under-17 association football team representing Togo

Togo U-17
- Nickname(s): Les Éperviers (The Sparrow Hawks)
- Association: Togolese Football Federation
- Confederation: CAF (Africa)
- Sub-confederation: WAFU (West Africa)
- Home stadium: Stade de Kégué
- FIFA code: TOG
First colours	Second colours

U-17 Africa Cup of Nations
- Appearances: 1 (first in 2007)
- Best result: Runners-up (2007)

FIFA U-17 World Cup
- Appearances: 1 (first in 2007)
- Best result: Group Stage (2007)

The Togo national under-17 football team represents Togo in association football at this age level. They are controlled by the Fédération Togolaise de Football.

== Competitive record ==
=== FIFA U-16 and U-17 World Cup record ===
FIFA U-16 and U-17 World Cup
Year	Round	PLD	W	D*	L	GS	GA
(China) 1985	Did not qualify						
(Canada) 1987	Did not qualify						
(Scotland) 1989	Did not qualify						
(Italy) 1991	Did not qualify						
(Japan) 1993	Did not qualify						
(Ecuador) 1995	Did not qualify						
(Egypt) 1997	Did not qualify						
(New Zealand) 1999	Did not qualify						
(Trinidad and Tobago) 2001	Did not qualify						
(Finland) 2003	Did not qualify						
(Peru) 2005	Did not qualify						
(South Korea) 2007	Group stage	3	0	2	1	2	3
(Nigeria) 2009	Did not qualify						
(Mexico) 2011	Did not qualify						
(United Arab Emirates) 2013	Did not qualify						
(Chile) 2015	Did not qualify						
(India) 2017	Did not qualify						
(Brazil) 2019	Did not qualify						
(Indonesia) 2023	Did not qualify						
(Qatar) 2025	Did not qualify						
(Qatar) 2026	Did not qualify						
Total	1/21	3	0	2	1	2	3

=== U-17 Africa Cup of Nations record ===
U-17 Africa Cup of Nations
Year	Round	GP	W	D*	L	GS	GA
(Mali) 1995	did not qualify						
(Botswana) 1997	did not enter						
(Guinea) 1999	did not qualify						
(Seychelles) 2001	withdrew						
(Eswatini) 2003	withdrew						
(The Gambia) 2005	did not enter						
(Togo) 2007	Runners-up	5	3	0	2	6	6
(Algeria) 2009	did not enter						
(Rwanda) 2011	withdrew						
(Morocco) 2013	did not enter						
(Niger) 2015	did not qualify						
(Gabon) 2017	did not enter						
(Tanzania) 2019	did not qualify						
(Algeria) 2023	did not qualify						
(Morocco) 2025	did not qualify						
Total	Runners-up	5	3	0	2	6	6

== See also ==
- Togo national football team
- Togo national under-20 football team
