= Sudan national under-17 football team =

Sudan U-17
- Association: Sudan Football Association
- Confederation: CAF (Africa)
- Sub-confederation: CECAFA (East & Central Africa)
- Home stadium: Khartoum Stadium
- FIFA code: SDN
First colours	Second colours

U-17 Africa Cup of Nations
- Appearances: 1 (first in 1995)
- Best result: Round 1 (1995)

FIFA U-17 World Cup
- Appearances: 1 (first in 1991)
- Best result: Round 1 (1991)

The Sudan National Under-17 Football Team, represents Sudan in international football at an under-17 level and is controlled by the Sudan Football Association. The team's first appearance on the world stage was in the 1991 FIFA U-17 World Championship in Italy.

== Competitive record ==
=== FIFA U-16 and U-17 World Cup record ===
FIFA U-16 and U-17 World Cup record
Year	Round	Position	GP	W	D*	L	GS	GA
(China) 1985	Did not enter							
(Canada) 1987	Withdrew							
(Scotland) 1989	Did not enter							
(Italy) 1991	Group stage	10th	3	1	0	2	5	5
(Japan) 1993	Did not enter							
(Ecuador) 1995	Did not qualify							
(Egypt) 1997	Did not qualify							
(New Zealand) 1999	Withdrew							
(Trinidad and Tobago) 2001	Did not qualify							
(Finland) 2003	Withdrew							
(Peru) 2005	Did not qualify							
(South Korea) 2007	Did not qualify							
(Nigeria) 2009	Did not qualify							
(Mexico) 2011	Did not qualify							
(United Arab Emirates) 2013	Withdrew							
(Chile) 2015	Did not qualify							
(India) 2017	Did not qualify							
(Brazil) 2019	Did not qualify							
(Indonesia) 2023	Did not qualify							
(Qatar) 2025	Did not qualify							
Total	1/20		3	1	0	2	5	5

=== U-17 Africa Cup of Nations record ===
U-17 Africa Cup of Nations
Year	Round	Position	GP	W	D*	L	GS	GA
(Mali) 1995	Group stage	5th	3	1	1	1	3	5
(Botswana) 1997	Did not enter							
(Guinea) 1999	Withdrew							
(Seychelles) 2001	Did not qualify							
(Eswatini) 2003	Withdrew							
(The Gambia) 2005	Did not qualify							
(Togo) 2007	Did not qualify							
(Algeria) 2009	Did not qualify							
(Rwanda) 2011	Did not qualify							
(Morocco) 2013	Withdrew							
(Niger) 2015	Did not qualify							
(Gabon) 2017	Did not qualify							
(Tanzania) 2019	Did not qualify							
(Algeria) 2023	Withdrew							
(Ivory Coast) 2025	Did not qualify							
Total	1/15		3	1	1	1	3	5

=== CAF U-16 and U-17 World Cup Qualifiers record ===
CAF U-16 and U-17 World Cup Qualifiers record
Appearances: 1
Year	Round	Position	Pld	W	D	L	GF	GA
1985	Did not enter							
1987	Withdrew							
1989	Did not enter							
1991	Fourth round		5	3	1	1	5	4
1993	Did not enter							
Total	1/5	Fourth round	5	3	1	1	5	4

*Draws include knockout matches decided on penalty kicks.

== Head-to-head record ==
The following table shows Sudan's head-to-head record in the FIFA U-17 World Cup.

Opponent	Pld	W	D	L	GF	GA	GD	Win %
Brazil	1	0	0	1	0	1	−1	0.00
Germany	1	0	0	1	1	3	−2	0.00
United Arab Emirates	1	1	0	0	4	1	+3	100.00
Total	3	1	0	2	5	5	+0	33.33

== See also ==
- Sudan national football team
- Sudan national under-23 football team
- Sudan national under-20 football team
