= Burundi national under-17 football team =

National under-17 association football team representing Burundi

Burundi U-17
- Nickname(s): Intamba; Les Hirondelles; The Chayfs (The Swallows)
- Association: Fédération de Football du Burundi (FBF) (Ishirahamwe ry'umupira w'amaguru ry'Uburundi)
- Confederation: CAF (Africa)
- Sub-confederation: CECAFA (East & Central Africa)
| First colours | Second colours |

U-17 Africa Cup of Nations
- Appearances: None

FIFA U-17 World Cup
- Appearances: None

The Burundi national under-17 football team, nicknamed the Chayfs, represents Burundi in international youth football competitions. Its primary role is the development of players in preparation for the senior national team. The team competes in a variety of competitions, including the biennial FIFA U-17 World Cup and the U-17 Africa Cup of Nations, which is the top competitions for this age group.

== Competitive record ==
=== FIFA U-16 and U-17 World Cup record ===
FIFA U-16 and U-17 World Cup
| Year | Round | GP | W | D^{1} | L | GS | GA |
|---|---|---|---|---|---|---|---|
| (China) 1985 | Did not qualify | | | | | | |
| (Canada) 1987 | Did not qualify | | | | | | |
| (Scotland) 1989 | Did not qualify | | | | | | |
| (Italy) 1991 | Did not qualify | | | | | | |
| (Japan) 1993 | Did not qualify | | | | | | |
| (Ecuador) 1995 | Did not qualify | | | | | | |
| (Egypt) 1997 | Did not qualify | | | | | | |
| (New Zealand) 1999 | Did not qualify | | | | | | |
| (Trinidad and Tobago) 2001 | Did not qualify | | | | | | |
| (Finland) 2003 | Did not qualify | | | | | | |
| (Peru) 2005 | Did not qualify | | | | | | |
| (South Korea) 2007 | Did not qualify | | | | | | |
| (Nigeria) 2009 | Did not qualify | | | | | | |
| (Mexico) 2011 | Did not qualify | | | | | | |
| (United Arab Emirates) 2013 | Did not qualify | | | | | | |
| (Chile) 2015 | Did not qualify | | | | | | |
| (India) 2017 | Did not qualify | | | | | | |
| (Brazil) 2019 | Did not qualify | | | | | | |
| (Indonesia) 2023 | Did not qualify | | | | | | |
| (Qatar) 2025 | Did not qualify | | | | | | |
| Total | 0/20 | 0 | 0 | 0 | 0 | 0 | 0 |

^{1}Draws include knockout matches decided on penalty kicks.

== See also ==
- Burundi national football team
- Burundi national under-20 football team
