= Ethiopia national under-17 football team =

National under-17 association football team representing Ethiopia

Ethiopia U-17
- Nickname: Red Foxes
- Association: Ethiopian Football Federation
- Confederation: CAF (Africa)
- Head coach: Benjamin Ziemer
- Home stadium: Bahir Dar Stadium
- FIFA code: ETH
First colours	Second colours

First international
- Ethiopia 1–0 Sudan (Ethiopia; 24 August 1996)

Biggest win
- Ethiopia 6–2 South Sudan (Tanzania; 19 August 2018)

Biggest defeat
- Ethiopia 0–4 Nigeria (Swaziland; 1 June 2003)

U-17 Africa Cup of Nations
- Appearances: 3 (first in 1997)
- Best result: Fourth place (1997)

FIFA U-17 World Cup
- Appearances: None

The Ethiopia national under-17 football team, nicknamed the Red Foxes, represents Ethiopia in international youth football competitionsand is controlled by Ethiopian Football Federation. Its primary role is the development of players in preparation for the senior national team. The team competes in a variety of competitions, including the biennial FIFA U-17 World Cup and the U-17 Africa Cup of Nations, which is the top competitions for this age group.

== Competitive record ==
=== FIFA U-16 and U-17 World Cup record ===
FIFA U-16 and U-17 World Cup
Year	Round	GP	W	D^{1}	L	GS	GA
(China) 1985	Did not qualify						
(Canada) 1987	Did not qualify						
(Scotland) 1989	Did not qualify						
(Italy) 1991	Did not qualify						
(Japan) 1993	Did not qualify						
(Ecuador) 1995	Did not qualify						
(Egypt) 1997	Did not qualify						
(New Zealand) 1999	Did not qualify						
(Trinidad and Tobago) 2001	Did not qualify						
(Finland) 2003	Did not qualify						
(Peru) 2005	Did not qualify						
(South Korea) 2007	Did not qualify						
(Nigeria) 2009	Did not qualify						
(Mexico) 2011	Did not qualify						
(United Arab Emirates) 2013	Did not qualify						
(Chile) 2015	Did not qualify						
(India) 2017	Did not qualify						
(Brazil) 2019	Did not qualify						
(Indonesia) 2023	Did not qualify						
(Qatar) 2025	Did not qualify						
Total	0/20	0	0	0	0	0	0

^{1}Draws include knockout matches decided on penalty kicks.

=== U-17 Africa Cup of Nations record ===
U-17 Africa Cup of Nations
Year	Round	GP	W	D	L	GS	GA
(Mali) 1995	Did not enter						
(Botswana) 1997	Fourth place	5	2	0	3	10	10
(Guinea) 1999	Did not qualify						
(Seychelles) 2001	Group stage	3	1	1	1	3	5
(Eswatini) 2003	Group stage	3	0	0	3	3	10
(The Gambia) 2005	Did not qualify						
(Togo) 2007	Did not qualify						
(Algeria) 2009	Did not enter						
(Rwanda) 2011	Did not qualify						
(Morocco) 2013	Did not qualify						
(Niger) 2015	Did not qualify						
(Gabon) 2017	Did not qualify						
(Tanzania) 2019	Did not qualify						
(Algeria) 2023	Did not qualify						
(Morocco) 2025	Did not enter						
(Morocco) 2026	Group stage	3	1	1	1	2	2
Total	4/16	11	4	2	8	18	27

== Current squad ==
No.	Pos.	Player	Date of birth (age)	Caps	Goals	Club
1	GK	Sitotaw Abebe Loriso	8 August 2006 (age 19)	-	-	-
19	GK	Kirubel Hayel Asira	7 March 2006 (age 20)	-	-	-
20	GK	Alazar Markos Malko	25 February 2006 (age 20)	-	-	-
3	DF	Naanol Daniel Tesfaye	14 August 2006 (age 19)	-	-	-
4	DF	Muhaba Adem Mosa	19 February 2006 (age 20)	-	-	-
5	DF	Rejebe Mifta Tofik	22 January 2006 (age 20)	-	-	-
12	DF	Yared Matiwos Lera	8 February 2006 (age 20)	-	-	-
13	DF	Amanuel Terfa Mengesha	23 January 2006 (age 20)	-	-	-
17	DF	Bereket Kaleb Mune	14 November 2006 (age 19)	-	-	-
2	MF	Habtom Woldu Gebremedhn	11 August 2006 (age 19)	-	-	-
6	MF	Abel Yonas Assefa	18 January 2006 (age 20)	-	-	-
7	MF	Wondimagegn Hailu Bunaro	21 March 2006 (age 20)	-	-	-
8	MF	Ashenafi Alute Akako	25 March 2006 (age 20)	-	-	-
10	MF	Biniyam Ayiten Beyene	31 March 2006 (age 20)	-	-	-
14	MF	Robson Demissew Gondere	7 March 2006 (age 20)	-	-	-
15	MF	Brook Gebremariam Bereket	12 June 2006 (age 20)	-	-	-
21	MF	Eyosias Molla Gessesse	31 January 2006 (age 20)	-	-	-
9	FW	Mintesnot Endrias Wakjira	3 February 2006 (age 20)	-	-	-
7	MF	Ammanuel Ferede Esayas	4 February 2004 (age 22)	-	-	-
11	FW	Kedir Ali Mohammedhagos	9 July 2006 (age 19)	-	-	-
16	FW	Beyene Banja Bayse(captain)	19 May 2006 (age 20)	-	-	-
18	FW	Muluken Bekele Gebresilasse	17 January 2006 (age 20)	-	-	-
22	FW	Abel Tegenye Mamo	26 February 2006 (age 20)	-	-	-

== See also ==
- Ethiopia national football team
- Ethiopia national under-20 football team
