= 2003 African U-17 Championship =

African U-17 Championship 2003

Tournament details
- Host country: Swaziland
- City: Mbabane
- Dates: 25 May – 8 June
- Teams: 8 (from 1 confederation)

Final positions
- Champions: Cameroon (1st title)
- Runners-up: Sierra Leone
- Third place: Nigeria
- Fourth place: Egypt

Tournament statistics
- Matches played: 16
- Goals scored: 44 (2.75 per match)

The 2003 African U-17 Championship was a football competition organized by the Confederation of African Football (CAF). The tournament took place in Swaziland. The top three teams qualified for the 2003 FIFA U-17 World Championship.

== Qualification ==
=== Qualified teams ===
- Cameroon
- Egypt
- Ethiopia
- Gambia
- Guinea
- Nigeria
- Sierra Leone
- Swaziland (host nation)

== Group stage ==
=== Group A ===
Pos	Team	Pld	W	D	L	GF	GA	GD	Pts	Qualification
1	Egypt	3	2	1	0	2	0	+2	7	Knockout stage
2	Sierra Leone	3	1	2	0	5	3	+2	5	Knockout stage
3	Guinea	3	1	1	1	9	4	+5	4	
4	Swaziland (H)	3	0	0	3	0	9	−9	0	

Rules for classification: Group stage tiebreakers
(H) Hosts
25 May 2003

Swaziland	0–1	Egypt

Somhlolo National Stadium, Mbabane

25 May 2003

Sierra Leone	3–3	Guinea

Somhlolo National Stadium, Mbabane

28 May 2003

Egypt	1–0	Guinea

Somhlolo National Stadium, Mbabane

28 May 2003

Sierra Leone	2–0	Swaziland

Somhlolo National Stadium, Mbabane

31 May 2003

Egypt	0–0	Sierra Leone

Somhlolo National Stadium, Mbabane

31 May 2003

Guinea	6–0	Swaziland

Somhlolo National Stadium, Mbabane

=== Group B ===
Pos	Team	Pld	W	D	L	GF	GA	GD	Pts	Qualification
1	Nigeria	3	3	0	0	6	0	+6	9	Knockout stage
2	Cameroon	3	1	1	1	7	6	+1	4	Knockout stage
3	Gambia	3	1	1	1	3	3	0	4	
4	Ethiopia	3	0	0	3	3	10	−7	0	

Rules for classification: Group stage tiebreakers
26 May 2003

Nigeria	1–0	Cameroon

Somhlolo National Stadium, Mbabane

26 May 2003

Gambia	1–0	Ethiopia

Somhlolo National Stadium, Mbabane

29 May 2003

Nigeria	1–0	Gambia

Somhlolo National Stadium, Mbabane

29 May 2003

Cameroon	5–3	Ethiopia

Somhlolo National Stadium, Mbabane

1 June 2003

Ethiopia	0–4	Nigeria

Somhlolo National Stadium, Mbabane

1 June 2003

Cameroon	2–2	Gambia

Somhlolo National Stadium, Mbabane

== Knock-out stage ==
Semi-finals
5 June - Mbabane
Egypt	1
Cameroon	2
5 June - Mbabane
Nigeria	0
Sierra Leone	1

Final
8 June - Mbabane
Cameroon (a.e.t.)	1
Sierra Leone	0
Third place
7 June - Mbabane
Egypt	1
Nigeria	3

=== Semi-finals ===
5 June 2003

Egypt	1–2	Cameroon

Somhlolo National Stadium, Mbabane

5 June 2003

Nigeria	0–1	Sierra Leone

Somhlolo National Stadium, Mbabane

For winning their semi-finals, Cameroon and Sierra Leone qualified for the 2003 FIFA U-17 World Championship with Egypt and Nigeria meeting in the third place match for the third and final place in the 2003 FIFA U-17 World Championship.

=== Third place match ===
7 June 2003

Egypt	1–3	Nigeria

Somhlolo National Stadium, Mbabane

For winning the third place match, Nigeria qualified for the 2003 FIFA U-17 World Championship with Egypt missing out.

=== Final ===
8 June 2003

Cameroon	1–0 (a.e.t.)	Sierra Leone

Somhlolo National Stadium, Mbabane
