= 2001 African U-17 Championship =

4th edition of U-17 AFCON

Tournament details
- Host country: Seychelles
- Dates: 17 February – 3 March
- Teams: 8 (from 1 confederation)
- Venue: 2 (in 2 host cities)

Final positions
- Champions: Nigeria (1st title)
- Runners-up: Burkina Faso
- Third place: Mali
- Fourth place: Vacant (Note: Guinea was disqualified after FIFA suspended its national association on 2 March, the day of the final, due to government interference. The final was then postponed to the following day (to 3 March), with Guinea's semi-final opponents, Burkina Faso, being advanced to the final against Nigeria. The third-place match was also scratched, with fourth place being declared vacant.)

Tournament statistics
- Matches played: 15
- Goals scored: 51 (3.4 per match)

The 2001 African U-17 Championship was the 4th edition (9th if editions of the tournament without hosts are included) of the biennial youth association football tournament organized by the Confederation of African Football (CAF) for its nations, consisting of players under the age of 17. This edition took place in Seychelles from 17 February to 3 March, with the finalists and the winning semi-finalist qualifying for the 2001 FIFA U-17 World Championship.

Guinea were disqualified from competing in the final after FIFA suspended its national association a day earlier due to government interference, forcing the final to be postponed by a day and Guinea's semi-final opponents Burkina Faso competing the final in their place.

== Qualification ==
=== Qualified teams ===
- Burkina Faso
- Cameroon
- Ethiopia
- Guinea
- Mali
- Mozambique
- Nigeria
- Seychelles (host nation)

== Group stage ==
=== Group A ===
Pos	Team	Pld	W	D	L	GF	GA	GD	Pts	Qualification
1	Burkina Faso	3	2	1	0	6	2	+4	7	Knockout stage
2	Mali	3	2	0	1	10	2	+8	6	Knockout stage
3	Cameroon	3	1	1	1	7	3	+4	4	
4	Seychelles (H)	3	0	0	3	1	17	−16	0	

Rules for classification: Group stage tiebreakers
(H) Hosts
17 Feb 2001

Seychelles	0 – 5	Cameroon

Stade Linité, Victoria

17 Feb 2001

Mali	0 – 1	Burkina Faso

Stade Linité, Victoria

20 Feb 2001

Cameroon	1 – 2	Mali

Stade Linité, Victoria

20 Feb 2001

Burkina Faso	4 – 1	Seychelles

Stade Linité, Victoria

23 Feb 2001

Cameroon	1 – 1	Burkina Faso

Stade Linité, Victoria

23 Feb 2001

Seychelles	0 – 8	Mali

Stade Linité, Victoria

=== Group B ===
Pos	Team	Pld	W	D	L	GF	GA	GD	Pts	Qualification
1	Nigeria	3	2	1	0	9	3	+6	7	Knockout stage
2	Guinea	3	1	2	0	6	2	+4	5	Knockout stage
3	Ethiopia	3	1	1	1	3	5	−2	4	
4	Mozambique	3	0	0	3	1	9	−8	0	

Rules for classification: Group stage tiebreakers
18 Feb 2001

Nigeria	2 – 2	Guinea

Stade Linité, Victoria

18 Feb 2001

Mozambique	1 – 2	Ethiopia

Stade Linité, Victoria

21 Feb 2001

Guinea	4 – 0	Mozambique

Stade Linité, Victoria

21 Feb 2001

Ethiopia	1 – 4	Nigeria

Stade Linité, Victoria

24 Feb 2001

Guinea	0 – 0	Ethiopia

Stade Linité, Victoria

24 Feb 2001

Nigeria	3 – 0	Mozambique

Stade Linité, Victoria

== Knock-out stage ==
Semi-finals
Feb 27 - Victoria
Burkina Faso	1
Guinea	2
Feb 27 - Victoria
Nigeria	1 (4)
Mali	1 (3)

Final
Mar 3 - Victoria
Nigeria	3
Burkina Faso	0
Third place
Mali	-
Walkover (Note: The match was scratched and Mali were awarded third place, with fourth place being declared vacant, following Guinea's disqualification after FIFA suspended its national association on 2 March, the day of the final, due to government interference.)

=== Semi-finals ===
27 Feb 2001

Burkina Faso	1–2	Guinea

Stade Linité, Victoria

27 Feb 2001

Nigeria	1–1 (a.e.t.)	Mali
Penalties
	4–3

Stade Linité, Victoria

=== Third place match ===
Following Guinea's disqualification, the match was scratched and Mali were awarded third place, with fourth place being declared vacant. The final was played a day later on 3 March, with Guinea's semi-final opponents Burkina Faso contesting the final against Nigeria.

=== Final ===
3 March 2001 (originally 2 March)

Nigeria	3–0	Burkina Faso

Stade Linité, Victoria

== Winners ==
2001 CAF Under-17 Championship
(Nigeria)
Nigeria
First/Inaugural title

== African participants at the 2001 FIFA U-17 World Championship ==
The teams below qualified for the 2001 FIFA U-17 World Championship.

- Nigeria
- Burkina Faso
- Mali
