= 2025 COSAFA Under-17 Championship =

2025 COSAFA U-17 Youth Championship
Tournament details
- Host country: Zimbabwe
- Dates: 11–20 September
- Teams: 12
- Venues: 2 (in 1 host city)

Final positions
- Champions: South Africa (4th title)
- Runners-up: Angola
- Third place: Mozambique
- Fourth place: Comoros

Tournament statistics
- Matches played: 22
- Goals scored: 79 (3.59 per match)
- Top scorer(s): (Angola) Pedro Antonio (8 goals)
- Best player: (South Africa) Omphemetse Sekgoto
- Best goalkeeper: (Angola) Gelson Joaquim Dala
- Fair play award: Mozambique

The 2025 COSAFA U-17 Youth Championship (officially known as the TotalEnergies U-17 Africa Cup of Nations 2026 — COSAFA Qualifiers) was the 13th edition of the COSAFA U-17 Youth Championship (and the 5th time the tournament served as the qualifiers for the continental final tournament), the international youth football championship organised by COSAFA for the men's under-17 national teams of Southern Africa. Zimbabwe was the host of the tournament.

Zambia were the defending champions, having defeated Angola 2–1 in the final of the previous edition, but failed to make it past the group stage. South Africa won their fourth title defeating Angola 2–1 in the final.

== Participation ==
=== Participating teams ===
Twelve of the 14 COSAFA member nations entered the competition, which served as the regional qualifying tournament for the 2026 U-17 Africa Cup of Nations.

Note: All statistics exclude instances where the team was disqualified during the tournament.

Team	Appearance	Last appearance	Previous best performance
Angola	8th	2024 (Runners-Up)	Champions (2018, 2021)
Botswana	10th	2024 (Group Stage)	Third place (2002)
Comoros	3rd	2024 (Group stage)	Group stage (2019)
Eswatini	9th	2024 (Group Stage)	Runners-up (2002)
Lesotho	9th	2024 (Group stage)	Fourth place (2002)
Madagascar	4th	2017 (Group stage)	Group stage (2001, 2016, 2017)
Malawi	12th	2024 (Group Stage)	Champions (2001)
Mauritius	7th	2024 (Group Stage)	Runners-up (2017)
Mozambique	7th	2024 (Group stage)	Runners-up (1994, 2019)
South Africa	12th	2024 (Semi-finalist)	Champions (1994, 2002, 2020)
Zambia	11th	2024 (Champions)	Champions (2017, 2019, 2022, 2024)
Zimbabwe	7th	2024 (Semi-finalist)	Champions (2007)

Did not enter

- Namibia
- Seychelles

=== Draw ===
The draw was held on 5 August 2025 at 11:30 CAT (UTC+2) at Johannesburg. The 12 teams were drawn into three groups of four teams, with hosts Zimbabwe seeded in Group A (position A1), the defending champions Zambia seeded in Group B (position B1) and Angola seeded in Group C (position C1). The remaining 9 teams were allocated to two pots based on the results of the previous tournament edition and were drawn to the remaining positions.

Seeds	Pot 1	Pot 2
Zimbabwe (hosts); Zambia (title holder); Angola	Botswana; Mozambique; South Africa	Comoros; Eswatini; Lesotho; Madagascar; Mauritius; Malawi

=== Squads ===
Each team was required to register a squad of 20 players for the tournament, with players born on or after 1 January 2009 eligible to participate.

== Venues ==
Harare		2025 COSAFA Under-17 Championship is located in Zimbabwe
Ngoni Stadium	Hearts Stadium	2025 COSAFA Under-17 Championship is located in Zimbabwe
Capacity: 7,000	Capacity: 5,000	2025 COSAFA Under-17 Championship is located in Zimbabwe

== Match officials ==
The following officials were appointed to officiate the tournament:

Referees

- (Angola) Nelson da Silva
- (Botswana) Keabetswe Dintwa
- (Comoros) Moustoifa Kalido
- (Lesotho) Lebalang Mokete
- (Madagascar) Josianno Todihajaniaina
- (Malawi) Eness Gumbo (Note: Main Referee and Video assistant referee)
- (Malawi) Godfrey Nkhakananga
- (Namibia) Mweshitsama Naftal
- (Namibia) Antsino Twanyanyukwa
- (Seychelles) Noris Arissol
- (South Africa) Luxolo Badi
- (Zambia) Hillary Hambaba
- (Zimbabwe) Thanks Nyahuye
- (Zimbabwe) Lawrence Zimondi

Assistant Referees

- (Botswana) Ookeditse Keitseope
- (Comoros) Moustoifa Elmahfoudhe
- (Eswatini) Zamani Simelane
- (Eswatini) Banele Thwala
- (Lesotho) Siza Dlangamandla
- (Madagascar) Lareunion Miladera
- (Malawi) Samuel Fudzulani
- (Namibia) Alex Lumponjani
- (South Africa) Kgara Mokoena (Note: Assistant Referee and Assistant video assistant referee)
- (Zambia) Trywell Nyirenda
- (Zimbabwe) Dominica Melusi

Video Assistant Referees

- (Zimbabwe) Brighton Chimene

Assistant Video Assistant Referees

- (Namibia) Alex Lumponjani
- (Seychelles) Shaji Padayachy

== Group stage ==
COSAFA announced the tournament schedule on 19 August 2025.

The top team of each group, along with the best second-placed team, advanced to the semi-finals.

Tie-breaking criteria for group play
Should two teams finish on the same number of points in the pool phase, they were separated by:
1. The result of their head-to-head meetings in the first instance;
2. Goal difference in all group matches;
3. Goals scored in all group matches;
4. Disciplinary points
  - Yellow card: −1 point;
  - Indirect red card (second yellow card): −3 points;
  - Direct red card: −3 points;
5. Drawing of lots.

Should more than two teams finish level on points, the following criteria will be used:

1. The greatest number of points obtained in the matches between the teams concerned;
2. The goal difference in the matches between the teams concerned;
3. The greatest number of goals scored in the matches between the teams concerned;
4. If after applying criteria (1) to (3), two teams are still equal, the criteria will be reapplied to matches played between the two teams in question to determine the final ranking of the two teams.

If this procedure does not allow for classification, the criteria listed below was applied in the indicated order:

1. Goal difference in all group matches;
2. The highest number of goals scored in all group matches;
3. Fair Play points system.

=== Group A ===
Pos	Team	Pld	W	D	L	GF	GA	GD	Pts	Qualification
1	Mozambique	3	2	1	0	5	0	+5	7	Semi-finals
2	Comoros	3	2	1	0	6	2	+4	7	Semi-finals
3	Zimbabwe (H)	3	0	1	2	2	4	−2	1	
4	Eswatini	3	0	1	2	0	7	−7	1	

Source: Soccerway
Rules for classification: Group stage tiebreakers
(H) Hosts
11 September 2024
12:00

Comoros	3–0	Eswatini
Ahamada 45+2'; M. Ali 86'; Mohamed 90+4'	Report

Ngoni Mwos Stadium, Harare
Referee: Hillary Hambaba (Zambia)
11 September 2024
15:00

Zimbabwe	0–1	Mozambique
	Report	Nhabanga 8'

Ngoni Mwos Stadium, Harare
Referee: Antsino Twanyanyukwa (Namibia)

13 September 2024
12:00

Mozambique	0–0	Comoros
	Report

Ngoni Mwos Stadium, Harare
Referee: Josianno Todihajaniaina (Madagascar)
13 September 2024
15:00

Zimbabwe	0–0	Eswatini
	Report

Ngoni Mwos Stadium, Harare
Referee: Mweshitsama Naftal (Namibia

15 September 2024
15:00

Eswatini	0–4	Mozambique
	Report	Nhabanga 60'; Machava 73'; Lazaro 82', 90+3'

Hearts Stadium, Harare
Referee: Godfrey Nkhakananga (Malawi)
15 September 2024
15:00

Zimbabwe	2–3	Comoros
Chakuchichi 59'; Aboudou 63' (o.g.)	Report	K. Ali 13'; Ahamada 77'; M. Ali 84'

Ngoni Mwos Stadium, Harare
Referee: Keabetswe Dintwa (Botswana)

=== Group B ===
Pos	Team	Pld	W	D	L	GF	GA	GD	Pts	Qualification
1	South Africa	3	3	0	0	13	2	+11	9	Semi-finals
2	Malawi	3	2	0	1	6	6	0	6	
3	Zambia	3	1	0	2	6	7	−1	3	
4	Madagascar	3	0	0	3	3	13	−10	0	

Source: Soccerway
Rules for classification: Group stage tiebreakers
12 September 2024
12:00

Madagascar	1–3	Malawi
Rambeloson 90+7' (pen.)	Report	Maziya 15'; Lumbe 26'; Rakotoharimalala 70' (o.g.)

Ngoni Mwos Stadium, Harare
Referee: Lebalang Mokete (Lesotho)
12 September 2024
15:00

Zambia	0–4	South Africa
	Report	Sekgoto 2'; Molepo 27' (pen.); Mhlongo 36'; Mbuti 74' (o.g.)

Ngoni Mwos Stadium, Harare
Referee: Keabetswe Dintwa (Botswana)

14 September 2024
12:00

South Africa	5–1	Madagascar
Molepo 26' (pen.); Mhlongo 31', 38', 69' (pen.); Simama 56'	Report	Rambeloson 15'

Hearts Stadium, Harare
Referee: Lebalang Mokete (Lesotho)
14 September 2024
15:00

Zambia	1–2	Malawi
Kunda 21'	Report	Lumbe 30', 45+9' (pen.)

Hearts Stadium, Harare
Referee: Antsino Twanyanyukwa (Namibia)

16 September 2024
15:00

Malawi	1–4	South Africa
Rundles 88'	Report	Simama 25', 64'; Molepo 54'; Madondo 90+9'

Ngoni Mwos Stadium, Harare
Referee: Mweshitsama Naftal (Namibia)
16 September 2024
15:00

Zambia	5–1	Madagascar
Chipelu 7', 90+7'; Simute 43'; Lungu 65'; Musonda 83'	Report	Razanadrakoto 40'

Hearts Stadium, Harare
Referee: Thanks Nyahuye (Zimbabwe)

=== Group C ===
Pos	Team	Pld	W	D	L	GF	GA	GD	Pts	Qualification
1	Angola	3	3	0	0	17	0	+17	9	Semi-finals
2	Lesotho	3	1	1	1	3	7	−4	4	
3	Botswana	3	0	2	1	1	6	−5	2	
4	Mauritius	3	0	1	2	3	11	−8	1	

Source: Soccerway
Rules for classification: Group stage tiebreakers
12 September 2024
12:00

Mauritius	2–3	Lesotho
Kee 15'; Sunnasee 59' (pen.)	Report	Makhupane 8'; Masithela 24'; Leanya 41'

Hearts Stadium, Harare
Referee: Godfrey Nkhakananga (Malawi)
12 September 2024
15:00

Angola	5–0	Botswana
Chianica 16'; António 45+2', 64'; Muanha 61'; Morais 89'	Report

Hearts Stadium, Harare
Referee: Luxolo Badi (South Africa)

14 September 2024
12:00

Botswana	1–1	Mauritius
Koketso 41' (pen.)	Report	Kee 52'

Ngoni Mwos Stadium, Harare
Referee: Lawrence Zimondi (Zimbabwe)
14 September 2024
15:00

Angola	5–0	Lesotho
Francisco 4' (pen.); Chianica 20'; Luvumbo 29', 53', 90'	Report

Ngoni Mwos Stadium, Harare
Referee: Mweshitsama Naftal (Namibia)

16 September 2024
15:00

Lesotho	0–0	Botswana
	Report

Ngoni Mwos Stadium, Harare
Referee: Josianno Todihajaniaina (Madagascar)
16 September 2024
15:00

Angola	7–0	Mauritius
António 15', 20', 45+7' (pen.), 73', 84'; Muanha 86'; Perrine 90+4' (o.g.)	Report

Hearts Stadium, Harare
Referee: Luxolo Badi (South Africa)

=== Ranking of second-placed teams ===
The best second-placed team qualified for the semi-finals.

Pos	Grp	Team	Pld	W	D	L	GF	GA	GD	Pts	Qualification
1	A	Comoros	3	2	1	0	6	2	+4	7	Semi-finals
2	B	Malawi	3	2	0	1	6	6	0	6	
3	C	Lesotho	3	1	1	1	3	7	−4	4	

Source: Soccerway
Rules for classification: Group stage tiebreakers

== Knockout stage ==
=== Bracket ===
Semi-finals
18 September – Harare
South Africa	7
Comoros	0
18 September – Harare
Mozambique	0
Angola	1

Final
20 September – Harare
South Africa	2
Angola	1
Third place
20 September – Harare
Comoros	0
Mozambique	3

=== Semi-finals ===
Winners qualified for 2026 U-17 Africa Cup of Nations.

18 September 2025
12:00

South Africa	7–0	Comoros
Majola 2'; Sekgoto 5', 29'; Mbilini 63', 66'; Mhlongo 81' (pen.); Madondo 90+5'	Report

Ngoni Mwos Stadium, Harare
Referee: Hillary Hambaba (Zambia)

18 September 2025
15:00

Mozambique	0–1	Angola
	Report	Francisco 10'

Ngoni Mwos Stadium, Harare
Referee: Mweshitsama Naftal (Namibia)

=== Third place playoff ===
Winners qualified for 2026 U-17 Africa Cup of Nations.

20 September 2025
11:00

Comoros	0–3	Mozambique
	Report	Mubai 38'; Lazaro 57', 75'

Ngoni Mwos Stadium, Harare
Referee: Keabetswe Dintwa (Botswana)

=== Final ===
20 September 2025
14:00

South Africa	2–1	Angola
Sekgoto 5'; Mbongo 79'	Report	António 67'

Ngoni Mwos Stadium, Harare
Referee: Antsino Twanyanyukwa (Namibia)

== Goalscorers ==
There were 79 goals scored in 22 matches, for an average of 3.59 goals per match.

8 goals

- (Angola) Pedro Antonio

5 goals

- (South Africa) Thandanani Mhlongo

4 goals

- (Mozambique) Marcos Lazaro
- (South Africa) Omphemetse Sekgoto

3 goals

- (Angola) Paulo Luvumbo
- (Malawi) James Lumbe
- (South Africa) Mpho Molepo
- (South Africa) Inganathi Simama

2 goals

- (Angola) Costantino Chianica
- (Angola) Eliseu Francisco
- (Angola) Jairo Muanha
- (Comoros) Fasifdine Ahamada
- (Comoros) Mathis Ali
- (Madagascar) William Rambeloson
- (Mauritius) Paw Kee
- (Mozambique) Chauson Nhabanga
- (South Africa) Ntokozo Madondo
- (South Africa) Mpho Mbilini
- (Zambia) Kelvin Chipelu

1 goal

- (Angola) Manuel Morais
- (Angola) Aphelele Majola
- (Botswana) Marcus Koketso
- (Comoros) Kais Ali
- (Comoros) Fahad Mohamed
- (Lesotho) Fisane Leanya
- (Lesotho) Lechesa Makhupane
- (Lesotho) Morena Masithela
- (Madagascar) Tinai Razanadrakoto
- (Malawi) Joel Maziya
- (Malawi) Eli Rundles
- (Mauritius) Nicholas Fani
- (Mozambique) Kristff Machava
- (Mozambique) Joaquim Mubai
- (South Africa) Siyabonga Mbongo
- (Zambia) Albert Kunda
- (Zambia) Steven Lungu
- (Zambia) Caleb Musonda
- (Zambia) Mapalo Simute
- (Zimbabwe) Tadiwa Chakuchichi

1 own goal

- (Comoros) Rayad Aboudou
- (Madagascar) Irintsoa Rakotoharimalala
- (Mauritius) Elvino Andre
- (Zambia) Emmanuel Mbuti

The COSAFA Technical Study Group announced the group stage Best XI as follows:

Goalkeepers	Defenders	Midfielders	Forwards
Group Stage Best XI
(Mozambique) Vilanculos	(Angola) Costa (Mozambique) Vera (Comoros) Amahada	(Angola) Silva (Mozambique) De Figueiredo (Mozambique) Nhabanga (South Africa) Molepo	(Comoros) Mchangama (Angola) Antonio (South Africa) Mhlongo

Coach: (Angola) Mario Catala

== Awards ==
The COSAFA U-17 Championship technical study group selected the following as the best of the tournament.

Award	Player
Best Player	(South Africa) Omphemetse Sekgoto
Top Goal scorer	(Angola) Pedro Antonio
Best Goalkeeper	(Angola) Gelson Joaquim Dala
Fairplay team	Mozambique

== Qualified teams for CAF U-17 Africa Cup of Nations ==
The following three teams from COSAFA qualified for the 2026 U-17 Africa Cup of Nations.

Team	Qualified on	Previous appearances in U-17 Africa Cup of Nations^{1}
Angola	18 September 2025	5 (1997, 1999, 2017, 2019, 2025)
South Africa	18 September 2025	5 (2005, 2007, 2015, 2023, 2025)
Mozambique	20 September 2025	2 (1995, 2001)

== See also ==
- 2025 COSAFA U-20 Cup
- 2025 COSAFA U-17 Girls' Championship
