= 2024 COSAFA Under-17 Championship =

COSAFA U-17 Youth Championship 2024
Campeonato COSAFA Sub-17 Masculino 2024

Tournament details
- Host country: South Africa
- Dates: 5–14 December
- Teams: 12 (from 1 sub-confederation)
- Venues: 2 (in 1 host city)

Final positions
- Champions: Zambia (4th title)
- Runners-up: Angola

Tournament statistics
- Matches played: 21
- Goals scored: 70 (3.33 per match)
- Top scorer(s): (Zambia) Abel Nyirongo (7 goals)
- Best player: (Zambia) Mapalo Simute
- Best goalkeeper: (Angola) Gelson Dala
- Fair play award: Angola

The 2024 COSAFA U-17 Youth Championship (officially known as the TotalEnergies U-17 Africa Cup of Nations 2025 — COSAFA Qualifiers) was the 12th edition of the COSAFA U-17 Youth Championship (and the 4th time the tournament served as the qualifiers for the continental final tournament), the international youth football championship organised by COSAFA for the men's under-17 national teams of Southern Africa. Mozambique was initially designated to host the tournament but was stripped of the hosting rights due to ongoing protests following the 2024 Mozambican general election. It was then moved to Johannesburg, South Africa.

Zambia were the defending champions, having defeated South Africa 2–1 in the final of the previous edition, and they successfully retained their title by defeating Angola 2–1 in the final.

== Participation ==
=== Participating teams ===
Twelve of the 14 COSAFA member nations have entered the competition, which serves as the regional qualifying tournament for the 2025 U-17 Africa Cup of Nations. Originally there were 2 qualification spots, but a third spot was added after the competition.

Note: All statistics exclude instances where the team was disqualified during the tournament.

Team	Appearance	Last appearance	Previous best performance
Angola	7th	2021 (Champions)	Champions (2018, 2021)
Botswana	9th	2022 (Fourth place)	Third place (2002)
Comoros	2nd	2019 (Group stage)	Group stage (2019)
Eswatini	8th	2021 (Fourth place)	Runners-up (2002)
Lesotho	8th	2021 (Group stage)	Fourth place (2002)
Malawi	11th	2022 (Third place)	Champions (2001)
Mauritius	6th	2018 (Fourth place)	Runners-up (2017)
Mozambique	6th	2022 (Group stage)	Runners-up (1994, 2019)
Namibia	7th	2022 (Group stage)	Champions (2016)
South Africa	11th	2022 (Runners-up)	Champions (1994, 2002, 2020)
Zambia	10th	2022 (Champions)	Champions (2017, 2019, 2022)
Zimbabwe	6th	2018 (Group stage)	Champions (2007)

Did not enter

- Madagascar
- Seychelles

=== Draw ===
The draw was held on 5 September 2024 at 11:00 CET (UTC+2) at Maputo. The 12 teams were drawn into three groups of four teams, with hosts Mozambique seeded in Group A (position A1), the defending champions Zambia seeded in Group B (position B1) and South Africa seeded in Group C (position C1). The remaining 9 teams were allocated to two pots based on the results of the previous tournament edition and were drawn to the remaining positions.

Seeds	Pot 1	Pot 2
Mozambique (hosts); Zambia (title holder); South Africa	Botswana; Malawi; Namibia	Angola; Comoros; Eswatini; Lesotho; Mauritius; Zimbabwe

=== Squads ===
Each team was required to register a squad of 20 players for the tournament, with players born on or after 1 January 2008 eligible to participate.

== Venues ==
On 26 November 2024, it was announced that the tournament had been moved from the original host city, Maputo, Mozambique, to Johannesburg, South Africa, with two venues selected to host all matches.

Johannesburg		2024 COSAFA Under-17 Championship is located in South Africa
UJ Soweto Stadium	UJ AW Muller Stadium	2024 COSAFA Under-17 Championship is located in South Africa
Capacity: 8,000	Capacity: 1,500	2024 COSAFA Under-17 Championship is located in South Africa

== Match officials ==
The following officials were appointed to oversee the tournament:

Referees

- (Angola) Nelson da Silva
- (Botswana) Joyce Seonyatseng
- (Botswana) Moemedi Thabologang
- (Eswatini) Thembinkosi Dlamini
- (Eswatini) Nothando Nkhumane
- (Mozambique) Wilson Muianga
- (Namibia) Mweshitsama Naftal
- (Namibia) Samuel Nghipandulwa
- (Seychelles) Noris Arissol
- (South Africa) Nonjabulo Ndlela
- (Zambia) Chola Chansa
- (Zimbabwe) Brighton Chimene

Assistant Referees

- (Botswana) Dorcus Chenset
- (Botswana) Mooketsi Mankanku
- (Eswatini) Celumusa Phiri
- (Lesotho) Siza Dlangamandla
- (Malawi) Lameck Phiri
- (South Africa) Nandipha Menze
- (Zambia) Warren Mulenga
- (Zimbabwe) Dominica Melusi

Video Assistant Referees

- (Eswatini) Letticia Viana
- (South Africa) Abongile Tom

Assistant Video Assistant Referees

- (South Africa) Akhona Makalima

== Group stage ==
Tie-breaking criteria for group play
Should two teams finish on the same number of points in the pool phase, they will be separated by:
1. The result of their head-to-head meetings in the first instance;
2. Goal difference in all group matches;
3. Goals scored in all group matches;
4. Disciplinary points
  - Yellow card: −1 point;
  - Indirect red card (second yellow card): −3 points;
  - Direct red card: −3 points;
5. Drawing of lots.

Should more than two teams finish level on points, the following criteria will be used:

1. The greatest number of points obtained in the matches between the teams concerned;
2. The goal difference in the matches between the teams concerned;
3. The greatest number of goals scored in the matches between the teams concerned;
4. If after applying criteria (1) to (3), two teams are still equal, the criteria will be reapplied to matches played between the two teams in question to determine the final ranking of the two teams.

If this procedure does not allow for classification, the criteria listed below will be applied in the indicated order:

1. Goal difference in all group matches;
2. The highest number of goals scored in all group matches;
3. Fair Play points system.

=== Group A ===
Pos	Team	Pld	W	D	L	GF	GA	GD	Pts	Qualification
1	Angola	3	2	1	0	4	2	+2	7	Semi-finals
2	Mozambique	3	1	1	1	2	2	0	4	
3	Lesotho	3	1	0	2	4	5	−1	3	
4	Malawi	3	0	2	1	4	5	−1	2	

Source: Soccerway
Rules for classification: Group stage tiebreakers
4 December 2024
12:00

Lesotho	1–2	Angola
Nqoko 85'	Report	Eliseu 32'; Densel 79'

UJ AW Muller Stadium, Johannesburg
Referee: Noris Arissol (Seychelles)
4 December 2024
15:00

Mozambique	1–1	Malawi
Kille 45+3'	Report	Chisale 90'

UJ AW Muller Stadium, Johannesburg
Referee: Thembinkosi Dlamini (Eswatini)

6 December 2024
12:00

Malawi	1–1	Angola
Lumbe 50'	Report	Dias Luvumbo 70'

UJ AW Muller Stadium, Johannesburg
Referee: Joyce Seonyatseng (Botswana)
6 December 2024
15:00

Mozambique	1–0	Lesotho
Levonor 90+4'	Report

UJ AW Muller Stadium, Johannesburg
Referee: Mweshitsama Naftal (Namibia)

8 December 2024
15:00

Malawi	2–3	Lesotho
Lumbe 42'; Nantunga 79' (pen.)	Report	Khetsi 6'; Nqoko 27', 54'

UJ Soweto Stadium, Johannesburg
Referee: Noris Arissol (Seychelles)
8 December 2024
15:00

Mozambique	0–1	Angola
	Report	Jario 63'

UJ AW Muller Stadium, Johannesburg
Referee: Moemedi Thabologang (Botswana)

=== Group B ===
Pos	Team	Pld	W	D	L	GF	GA	GD	Pts	Qualification
1	Zambia	3	3	0	0	14	1	+13	9	Semi-finals
2	Zimbabwe	3	1	1	1	10	10	0	4	Semi-finals
3	Namibia	3	1	1	1	6	13	−7	4	
4	Eswatini	3	0	0	3	2	8	−6	0	

Source: Soccerway
Rules for classification: Group stage tiebreakers
5 December 2024
12:00

Zimbabwe	5–1	Eswatini
Chakuchichi 22'; Sadomba 25', 35', 42'; Macheka 87'	Report	Me. Dlamini 90+3'

UJ Soweto Stadium, Johannesburg
Referee: Nelson da Silva (Angola)
5 December 2024
15:00

Zambia	8–0	Namibia
Simute 2', 5'; Nyirongo 43'; Solunga 46' (o.g.); Kalimina 50'; Phiri 83', 88', 90'	Report

UJ Soweto Stadium, Johannesburg
Referee: Nonjabulo Ndlela (South Africa)

7 December 2024
12:00

Namibia	2–1	Eswatini
Paulse 39'; Kamulu 90+4'	Report	A. Dlamini 60'

UJ Soweto Stadium, Johannesburg
Referee: Chola Chansa (Zambia)
7 December 2024
15:00

Zambia	5–1	Zimbabwe
Simute 8'; Nyirongo 79', 85', 88'; Chimwemwe 90+5'	Report	Macheka 31'

UJ Soweto Stadium, Johannesburg
Referee: Samuel Nghipandulwa (Namibia)

9 December 2024
12:00

Namibia	4–4	Zimbabwe
Gawab 11'; Paulse 52'; Useb 80'; Kandjou 87'	Report	Sadomba 35', 79'; Macheka 43'; Chakuchichi 77'

UJ Soweto Stadium, Johannesburg
Referee: Thembinkosi Dlamini (Eswatini)
9 December 2024
12:00

Zambia	1–0	Eswatini
Malupande 14'	Report

UJ AW Muller Stadium, Johannesburg
Referee: Joyce Seonyatseng (Botswana)

=== Group C ===
Pos	Team	Pld	W	D	L	GF	GA	GD	Pts	Qualification
1	South Africa (H)	3	3	0	0	10	2	+8	9	Semi-finals
2	Botswana	3	1	1	1	3	5	−2	4	
3	Comoros	3	0	2	1	1	4	−3	2	
4	Mauritius	3	0	1	2	2	5	−3	1	

Source: Soccerway
Rules for classification: Group stage tiebreakers
(H) Hosts
5 December 2024
12:00

Comoros	0–0	Mauritius
	Report

UJ AW Muller Stadium, Johannesburg
Referee: Moemedi Thabologang (Botswana)
5 December 2024
15:00

South Africa	4–0	Botswana
Stevens 6' (pen.); Witbooi 13'; Maraletse 49'; Bohloko 66'	Report

UJ AW Muller Stadium, Johannesburg
Referee: Wilson Muianga (Mozambique)

7 December 2024
12:00

Botswana	2–0	Mauritius
Tshidi 19', 90+4'	Report

UJ AW Muller Stadium, Johannesburg
Referee: Nelson da Silva (Angola)
7 December 2024
15:00

South Africa	3–0	Comoros
Stevens 6'; Maraletse 64'; Sekgoto 86'	Report

UJ AW Muller Stadium, Johannesburg
Referee: Mweshitsama Naftal (Namibia)

9 December 2024
15:00

Botswana	1–1	Comoros
Mananye 76'	Report	K. Saïd 80'

UJ Soweto Stadium, Johannesburg
Referee: Nonjabulo Ndlela (South Africa)
9 December 2024
15:00

South Africa	3–2	Mauritius
Pama 8'; Bohloko 10'; Sekgoto 13'	Report	Rabaye 53'; Ravina 87' (pen.)

UJ AW Muller Stadium, Johannesburg
Referee: Chola Chansa (Zambia)

=== Ranking of second-placed teams ===
The best second-placed team from all groups qualified for the semi-finals.

Pos	Grp	Team	Pld	W	D	L	GF	GA	GD	Pts	Qualification
1	B	Zimbabwe	3	1	1	1	10	10	0	4	Semi-finals
2	A	Mozambique	3	1	1	1	2	2	0	4	
3	C	Botswana	3	1	1	1	3	5	−2	4	

Source: Soccerway
Rules for classification: Group stage tiebreakers

== Knockout stage ==
In the knockout stage, a penalty shoot-out was used to decide the winner if necessary (no extra time was played).

=== Bracket ===
Semi-finals
11 December – Johannesburg
Angola	2
Zimbabwe	0
11 December – Johannesburg
Zambia	2
South Africa	1

Final
13 December – Johannesburg
Angola	1
Zambia	2

=== Semi-finals ===
Winners qualified for 2025 U-17 Africa Cup of Nations

11 December 2024
12:00

Angola	2–0	Zimbabwe
Eliseu 43'; Omar 63'	Report

UJ Soweto Stadium, Johannesburg
Referee: Nonjabulo Ndlela (South Africa)
11 December 2024
15:00

Zambia	2–1	South Africa
Nyirongo 22' (pen.); R. Banda 68'	Report	Mlondo 1'

UJ Soweto Stadium, Johannesburg
Referee: Brighton Chimene (Zimbabwe)

=== Final ===
13 December 2024
15:00

Angola	1–2	Zambia
Kalimina 43' (o.g.)	Report	Nyirongo 8', 90+4'

UJ Soweto Stadium, Johannesburg
Referee: Brighton Chimene (Zimbabwe)

== Goalscorers ==
There were 70 goals scored in 21 matches, for an average of 3.33 goals per match.

7 goals

- (Zambia) Abel Nyirongo

5 goals

- (Zimbabwe) El Shaddai Sadomba

3 goals

- (Lesotho) Rethabile Nqoko
- (Zambia) Gabriel Phiri
- (Zambia) Mapalo Simute
- (Zimbabwe) Valentine Macheka

2 goals

- (Angola) Eliseu
- (Botswana) Kgosi Tshidi
- (Malawi) James Lumbe
- (Namibia) Brayton Paulse
- (South Africa) Neo Bohloko
- (South Africa) Kamohelo Maraletse
- (South Africa) Omphemetse Sekgoto
- (South Africa) Selwyn Stevens
- (Zimbabwe) Tadiwa Chakuchichi

1 goal

- (Angola) Densel
- (Angola) Jario
- (Angola) Dias Luvumbo
- (Angola) Omar
- (Botswana) Kutlo Mananye
- (Comoros) Kaylan Saïd
- (Eswatini) Aviwe Dlamini
- (Eswatini) Menzi Dlamini
- (Lesotho) Thuto Khetsi
- (Malawi) Clifford Chisale
- (Malawi) Yusufu Nantunga
- (Mauritius) Julian Rabaye
- (Mauritius) Aldo Ravina
- (Mozambique) Kille Lino
- (Mozambique) Levonor Timbe
- (Namibia) Andriano Gawab
- (Namibia) Stephen Kamulu
- (Namibia) Ronald Kandjou
- (Namibia) Christiano Useb
- (South Africa) Simphiwe Mlondo
- (South Africa) Sive Pama
- (South Africa) Emile Witbooi
- (Zambia) Robert Banda
- (Zambia) Nkotami Chimwemwe
- (Zambia) Jonathan Kalimina
- (Zambia) Nthasilwe Malupande

1 own goal

- (Namibia) Milko Solunga (against Zambia)
- (Zambia) Jonathan Kalimina (against Angola)

== Awards ==
The following awards were given at the conclusion of the tournament:

- Player of the Tournament: (Zambia) Mapalo Simute
- Golden Boot: (Zambia) Abel Nyirongo (7 goals)
- Golden Glove (Angola) Gelson Dala
- Fair Play prize: Angola

== Qualified teams for CAF U-17 Africa Cup of Nations ==
The following three teams from COSAFA qualified for the 2025 U-17 Africa Cup of Nations.

Team	Qualified on	Previous appearances in U-17 Africa Cup of Nations^{1}
Angola	11 December 2024	4 (1997, 1999, 2017, 2019)
Zambia	11 December 2024	2 (2015, 2023)
South Africa	5 February 2025	4 (2005, 2007, 2015, 2023)

== See also ==
- 2024 COSAFA U-20 Cup
- 2024 COSAFA U-17 Girls' Championship
