= 2025 U-17 Africa Cup of Nations qualification =

Tournament details
- Host countries: Morocco (North Zone); Senegal (West A Zone); Ghana (West B Zone); Cameroon (Central Zone); Uganda (Central-East Zone); South Africa (South Zone)
- Dates: 15 May 2024 – 22 February 2025
- Teams: 41

Tournament statistics
- Matches played: 73
- Goals scored: 235 (3.22 per match)

The 2025 U-17 Africa Cup of Nations qualification was a men's under-17 football competition that decided the participating teams of the 2025 U-17 Africa Cup of Nations.

Players born on 1 January 2008 or later were eligible to participate in the competition. The host country for the final stage of the edition is Morocco, appointed during the annual CAF Executive Committee meeting along the 2024 CAF Awards ceremony in Marrakesh, Morocco where CAF appointed the country as host.

For this competition, it was expanded to 16 teams, so third place teams from some regions also qualified. In February 2025, the teams advancing were announced.

== Teams ==
| Zone | Spots | Teams entering qualification | Did not enter |
|---|---|---|---|
| North Zone (UNAF) | 3 spots | Algeria; **Egypt**; Libya; **Morocco**; **Tunisia** | |
| West A Zone (WAFU-UFOA A) | 3 spots | **Gambia**; ~~Guinea~~ **(W)**; Guinea-Bissau; Liberia; **Mali**; Mauritania; **Senegal**; Sierra Leone | Cape Verde |
| West B Zone (WAFU-UFOA B) | 2 spots | Benin; **Burkina Faso**; Ghana; **Ivory Coast**; Niger; Nigeria; Togo | |
| Central Zone (UNIFFAC) | 2 spots | **Cameroon**; **Central African Republic**; ~~Congo~~ **(W)**; DR Congo; Gabon | Chad; Equatorial Guinea; São Tomé and Príncipe |
| Central-East Zone (CECAFA) | 3 spots | ~~Burundi~~ (**W**); ~~Ethiopia~~ (**W**); Kenya; **Somalia**; South Sudan; Sudan; **Tanzania**; **Uganda** | Djibouti; Eritrea; Rwanda |
| South Zone (COSAFA) | 3 spots | **Angola**; Botswana; Comoros; Eswatini; Lesotho; Malawi; Mauritius; Mozambique; Namibia; **South Africa**; **Zambia**; Zimbabwe | Madagascar; Seychelles |

Notes

- Teams in **bold** qualified for the final tournament.
- (W): Withdrew after draw

== North Zone ==
The UNAF qualifiers took place in Casablanca, Morocco, from 11 to 23 November 2024. The qualifying tournament draw was held on 1 October 2024. The five UNAF members competed in a single round-robin format with the top three teams qualifying for the final tournament.

=== Table ===
| Pos | Team | Pld | W | D | L | GF | GA | GD | Pts | Qualification |
|---|---|---|---|---|---|---|---|---|---|---|
| 1 | Egypt | 4 | 3 | 0 | 1 | 13 | 9 | +4 | 9 | 2025 U-17 Africa Cup of Nations |
| 2 | Morocco (H) | 4 | 2 | 2 | 0 | 10 | 4 | +6 | 8 | 2025 U-17 Africa Cup of Nations |
| 3 | Tunisia | 4 | 2 | 1 | 1 | 7 | 6 | +1 | 7 | 2025 U-17 Africa Cup of Nations |
| 4 | Algeria | 4 | 1 | 1 | 2 | 5 | 6 | −1 | 4 | |
| 5 | Libya | 4 | 0 | 0 | 4 | 4 | 14 | −10 | 0 | |

Source: UNAF
Rules for classification: 1) Points; 2) Goal difference; 3) Goals scored
(H) Hosts

== West A Zone ==
The WAFU-UFOA Zone A qualifiers for the U-17 Africa Cup of Nations were hosted by Senegal with the matches played starting 22 October 2024. The matches were played at Dakar, Senegal.

All times are local, GMT (UTC+0).

=== Group stage ===
The eight teams were drawn into two groups of four teams. The winners and the runners-up of each group advanced to the semi-finals. Guinea withdrew after the draw.

==== Tiebreakers ====
Teams were ranked according to the three points for a win system (3 points for a win, 1 for a draw, 0 points for a loss), and if two teams were tied on points, the following tiebreaking criteria were applied, in the order given, to determine the rankings (Regulations Article 13):

1. Points in head-to-head matches match between the two tied teams;
2. Goal difference in all group matches;
3. Goals scored in all group matches;
4. Drawing of lots.

If more than two teams were tied, the following criteria were applied instead:

1. Points in matches between the tied teams;
2. Goal difference in matches between the tied teams;
3. Goals scored in matches between the tied teams;
4. If after applying all criteria above, two teams were still tied, the above criteria were again applied to matches played between the two teams in question. If this did not resolve the tie, the next three criteria were applied;
5. Goal difference in all group matches;
6. Goals scored in all group matches;
7. Drawing of lots.

==== Group A ====
| Pos | Team | Pld | W | D | L | GF | GA | GD | Pts | Qualification |
|---|---|---|---|---|---|---|---|---|---|---|
| 1 | Senegal (H) | 2 | 2 | 0 | 0 | 5 | 2 | +3 | 6 | Semi-finals |
| 2 | Gambia | 2 | 1 | 0 | 1 | 5 | 3 | +2 | 3 | Semi-finals |
| 3 | Liberia | 2 | 0 | 0 | 2 | 1 | 6 | −5 | 0 | |
| 4 | Guinea | 0 | 0 | 0 | 0 | 0 | 0 | 0 | 0 | Withdrew |

Source: WAFU A
Rules for classification: Group stage tiebreakers
(H) Hosts
22 October 2024
16:00

| Senegal | 2–1 | Liberia |
|---|---|---|
| Dabo 5'; E. Sow 7' | Report | Wile 90+3' |

Stade Lat-Dior, Thiès

25 October 2024
16:00

| Gambia | 1–3 | Senegal |
|---|---|---|
| Gomez 42' | Report | Dabo 1'; E. Cissé 22' (pen.); Mané 86' |

Stade Lat-Dior, Thiès
Referee: Abdel Kader M'Bareck (Mauritania)

28 October 2024
16:00

| Gambia | 4–0 | Liberia |
|---|---|---|
| Pewee 23' (o.g.); Gomez 29', 64'; Susso 58' | Report |

Stade Lat-Dior, Thiès

==== Group B ====
| Pos | Team | Pld | W | D | L | GF | GA | GD | Pts | Qualification |
|---|---|---|---|---|---|---|---|---|---|---|
| 1 | Mali | 3 | 3 | 0 | 0 | 6 | 0 | +6 | 9 | Semi-finals |
| 2 | Guinea-Bissau | 3 | 1 | 1 | 1 | 1 | 1 | 0 | 4 | Semi-finals |
| 3 | Sierra Leone | 3 | 1 | 0 | 2 | 1 | 2 | −1 | 3 | |
| 4 | Mauritania | 3 | 0 | 1 | 2 | 0 | 5 | −5 | 1 | |

Source: WAFU A
Rules for classification: Group stage tiebreakers
23 October 2024
15:00

| Mali | 1–0 | Sierra Leone |
|---|---|---|
| Dembélé 8' | Report |

Stade Lat-Dior, Thiès
23 October 2024
18:00

| Mauritania | 0–0 | Guinea-Bissau |
|---|---|---|
| | Report |

Stade Lat-Dior, Thiès

26 October 2024
15:00

| Sierra Leone | 1–0 | Mauritania |
|---|---|---|
| Kabia 45+1' | Report |

Stade Lat-Dior, Thiès
Referee: Younoussa Tawel Camara (Guinea)
26 October 2024
18:00

| Guinea-Bissau | 0–1 | Mali |
|---|---|---|
| | Report | Diakité 90' |

Stade Lat-Dior, Thiès
Referee: Washington N'Dolo (Liberia)

29 October 2024
16:00

| Mali | 4–0 | Mauritania |
|---|---|---|
| Simpara 16'; Coulibaly 23', 60'; Traoré 29' | Report |

Stade Lat-Dior, Thiès
29 October 2024
16:00

| Guinea-Bissau | 1–0 | Sierra Leone |
|---|---|---|
| José 45' | Report |

Annexe Stade Me. Abdoulaye Wade, Diamniadio, Dakar

=== Knockout stage ===
==== Bracket ====
Semi-finals
1 November – Thiès
Senegal (p) | 0 (4)
Guinea-Bissau | 0 (3)
1 November – Thiès
Mali | 3
Gambia | 2

Final
4 November – Thiès
Senegal (p) | 3 (5)
Mali | 3 (4)
Third place play-off
4 November – Thiès
Guinea-Bissau | 0 (5)
Gambia (p) | 0 (6)

==== Semi-finals ====
Winners qualified for 2025 U-17 Africa Cup of Nations.

1 November 2024
15:00

| Senegal | 0–0 | Guinea-Bissau |
|---|---|---|
| | Report |
Penalties
| E. Cissé (penalty scored); M. Ndiaye (penalty scored); M. Cissé (penalty scored); E. Ndiaye (penalty missed); I. Sow (penalty scored) | 4–3 | (penalty missed) Dino; (penalty scored) Biai; (penalty scored) Edney; (penalty scored) Eliseu; (penalty missed) Ismael |

Stade Lat-Dior, Thiès
Referee: Abdel Kader M'Bareck (Mauritania)

1 November 2024
18:00

| Mali | 3–2 | Gambia |
|---|---|---|
| Simpara 10', 67', 77' | Report | Leigh 32', 48' |

Stade Lat-Dior, Thiès
Referee: Younoussa Tawel Camara (Guinea)

==== Third place play-off ====
4 November 2024
15:00

| Guinea-Bissau | 0–0 | Gambia |
|---|---|---|
| | Report |
Penalties
| José (penalty scored); Biai (penalty scored); Dino (penalty scored); Herminio (penalty missed); Dabo (penalty missed); Edney (penalty missed); Gute (penalty scored); Edimilson (penalty missed); Leandro (penalty scored); Alfucene (penalty missed) | 5–6 | (penalty missed) Sarr; (penalty scored) Kanyi; (penalty scored) Susso; (penalty scored) Gomez; (penalty missed) Danso; (penalty missed) I. Sonko; (penalty scored) Leigh; (penalty missed) Mboob; (penalty scored) Jammeh; (penalty scored) Daffeh |

Annexe Stade Me. Abdoulaye Wade, Diamniadio, Dakar
Referee: Ousmane Diakité (Mali)

==== Final ====
4 November 2024
18:00

| Senegal | 3–3 | Mali |
|---|---|---|
| E. Ndiaye 48', 63'; Mendy 53' | Report | Dembélé 1'; Simpara 43'; Camara 67' |
Penalties
| E. Cissé (penalty scored); M. Ndiaye (penalty scored); M. Cissé (penalty scored); Dabo (penalty scored); I. Sow (penalty scored) | 5–4 | (penalty scored) Simpara; (penalty scored) Diarra; (penalty scored) Fané; (penalty missed) Traoré; (penalty scored) Camara |

Annexe Stade Me. Abdoulaye Wade, Diamniadio, Dakar
Referee: Abdallah Jammeh (Gambia)

== West B Zone ==
The WAFU-UFOA Zone B qualifiers for the U-17 Africa Cup of Nations were hosted by Ghana with the matches played between 15 and 28 May 2024, the draw was announced on 23 April 2024.

All times are local, GMT (UTC±0).

=== Group stage ===
The seven teams were drawn into two groups of three and four teams. The winners and the runners-up of each group advanced to the semi-finals.

==== Tiebreakers ====
Teams were ranked according to the three points for a win system (3 points for a win, 1 for a draw, 0 points for a loss), and if two teams were tied on points, the following tiebreaking criteria were applied, in the order given, to determine the rankings (Regulations Article 13):

1. Points in head-to-head matches match between the two tied teams;
2. Goal difference in all group matches;
3. Goals scored in all group matches;
4. Drawing of lots.

If more than two teams were tied, the following criteria were applied instead:

1. Points in matches between the tied teams;
2. Goal difference in matches between the tied teams;
3. Goals scored in matches between the tied teams;
4. If after applying all criteria above, two teams were still tied, the above criteria were again applied to matches played between the two teams in question. If this did not resolve the tie, the next three criteria were applied;
5. Goal difference in all group matches;
6. Goals scored in all group matches;
7. Drawing of lots.

==== Group A ====
| Pos | Team | Pld | W | D | L | GF | GA | GD | Pts | Qualification |
|---|---|---|---|---|---|---|---|---|---|---|
| 1 | Ghana (H) | 2 | 2 | 0 | 0 | 7 | 1 | +6 | 6 | Semi-finals |
| 2 | Ivory Coast | 2 | 1 | 0 | 1 | 2 | 5 | −3 | 3 | Semi-finals |
| 3 | Benin | 2 | 0 | 0 | 2 | 0 | 3 | −3 | 0 | |

Source: Soccerway
Rules for classification: Group stage tiebreakers
(H) Hosts
15 May 2024
15:00

| Ghana | 5–1 | Ivory Coast |
|---|---|---|
| Narbi 27', 42'; Sarpong 48'; Gbafa 53'; Mensah 90+1' | Report | Coulibaly 51' |

Legon Sports Stadium, Accra

18 May 2024
15:00

| Ivory Coast | 1–0 | Benin |
|---|---|---|
| Diabaté 90+1' | Report |

Legon Sports Stadium, Accra
Referee: Salisu Basheer (Nigeria)

21 May 2024
16:00

| Benin | 0–2 | Ghana |
|---|---|---|
| | Report | Mensah 19'; Ayamga 21' |

Legon Sports Stadium, Accra
Referee: Sadou Ali Brahamou (Niger)

==== Group B ====
| Pos | Team | Pld | W | D | L | GF | GA | GD | Pts | Qualification |
|---|---|---|---|---|---|---|---|---|---|---|
| 1 | Nigeria | 3 | 2 | 1 | 0 | 4 | 0 | +4 | 7 | Semi-finals |
| 2 | Burkina Faso | 3 | 2 | 1 | 0 | 3 | 0 | +3 | 7 | Semi-finals |
| 3 | Niger | 3 | 1 | 0 | 2 | 3 | 4 | −1 | 3 | |
| 4 | Togo | 3 | 0 | 0 | 3 | 2 | 8 | −6 | 0 | |

Source: Soccerway
Rules for classification: Group stage tiebreakers
16 May 2024
15:00

| Burkina Faso | 0–0 | Nigeria |
|---|---|---|
| | Report |

Legon Sports Stadium, Accra
16 May 2024
18:00

| Togo | 2–3 | Niger |
|---|---|---|
| Bassirou 66'; Eklou 87' | Report | Player N2 4', 49'; Player N9 75' |

Legon Sports Stadium, Accra

19 May 2024
15:00

| Togo | 0–2 | Burkina Faso |
|---|---|---|
| | Report | Tapsoba 59'; Fofana 90+3' |

Legon Sports Stadium, Accra
19 May 2024
18:00

| Nigeria | 1–0 | Niger |
|---|---|---|
| Adams 32' | Report |

Legon Sports Stadium, Accra

23 May 2024
5:00

| Niger | 0–1 | Burkina Faso |
|---|---|---|
| | Report | Diaby 28' |

Legon Sports Stadium, Accra
23 May 2024
18:00

| Nigeria | 3–0 | Togo |
|---|---|---|
| Adeleke 9', 58'; Adams 33' | Report |

Nduom Sports Stadium, Elmina

=== Knockout stage ===
==== Bracket ====
Semi-finals
25 May – Accra
Ghana | 1
Burkina Faso | 2
25 May – Accra
Nigeria | 0
Ivory Coast | 1

Final
28 May – Accra
Burkina Faso | 3
Ivory Coast | 1
Third place play-off
28 May – Accra
Ghana | 2
Nigeria | 3

==== Semi-finals ====
Winners qualified for 2025 U-17 Africa Cup of Nations.

25 May 2024
15:00

| Ghana | 1–2 | Burkina Faso |
|---|---|---|
| Narbi 27' | Report | Tapsoba 13', 48' |

Legon Sports Stadium, Accra
Referee: Sadou Ali Brahamou (Niger)
25 May 2024
18:30

| Nigeria | 0–1 | Ivory Coast |
|---|---|---|
| | Report | Coulibaly 54' |

Legon Sports Stadium, Accra
Referee: Aklesso Gnama (Togo)

==== Third place play-off ====
28 May 2024
16:00

| Ghana | 2–3 | Nigeria |
|---|---|---|
| Gbafa 19', 28' | Report | Muhammad 8'; Adeleke 40', 90+3' |

Legon Sports Stadium, Accra
Referee: Hugues Modeste Kokora (Ivory Coast)

==== Final ====
28 May 2024
19:00

| Burkina Faso | 3–1 | Ivory Coast |
|---|---|---|
| Tapsoba 27', 49'; Sawadogo 88' | Report | Diarra 30' |

Legon Sports Stadium, Accra
Referee: Salisu Basheer (Nigeria)

== Central Zone ==
The UNIFFAC qualifiers for the U-17 Africa Cup of Nations were held in Cameroon between 16–22 February 2025. The qualifying tournament draw was held on 6 February 2025. Four UNIFFAC members competed in a single round-robin format with the top two teams qualifying for the final tournament.

Congo was also placed into this group, but they were suspended on 6 February 2025 due to government interference in FECOFOOT operations. No announcement of their qualification status was immediately available, but on 16 February 2025, CAF released a reschedule of the qualifiers excluding Congo.

=== Tiebreakers ===
Teams were ranked according to the three points for a win system (3 points for a win, 1 for a draw, 0 points for a loss), and if two teams were tied on points, the following tiebreaking criteria were applied, in the order given, to determine the rankings (Regulations Article 13):

1. Points in head-to-head matches match between the two tied teams;
2. Goal difference in all group matches;
3. Goals scored in all group matches;
4. Drawing of lots.

If more than two teams were tied, the following criteria were applied instead:

1. Points in matches between the tied teams;
2. Goal difference in matches between the tied teams;
3. Goals scored in matches between the tied teams;
4. If after applying all criteria above, two teams were still tied, the above criteria were again applied to matches played between the two teams in question. If this did not resolve the tie, the next three criteria were applied;
5. Goal difference in all group matches;
6. Goals scored in all group matches;
7. Drawing of lots.

=== Results ===
| Pos | Team | Pld | W | D | L | GF | GA | GD | Pts | Qualification |
|---|---|---|---|---|---|---|---|---|---|---|
| 1 | Cameroon (H) | 3 | 3 | 0 | 0 | 22 | 1 | +21 | 9 | 2025 U-17 Africa Cup of Nations |
| 2 | Central African Republic | 3 | 2 | 0 | 1 | 4 | 11 | −7 | 6 | 2025 U-17 Africa Cup of Nations |
| 3 | DR Congo | 3 | 1 | 0 | 2 | 5 | 10 | −5 | 3 | |
| 4 | Gabon | 3 | 0 | 0 | 3 | 2 | 11 | −9 | 0 | |

Source: CAF
Rules for classification: Group stage tiebreakers
(H) Hosts
16 February 2025
13:00

| Cameroon | 9–0 | Central African Republic |
|---|---|---|
| | Report |

Reunification Stadium, Douala
16 February 2025
16:00

| DR Congo | 3–1 | Gabon |
|---|---|---|
| | Report |

Reunification Stadium, Douala

19 February 2025
13:00

| Gabon | 1–7 | Cameroon |
|---|---|---|
| | Report |

Reunification Stadium, Douala
19 February 2025
16:00

| Central African Republic | 3–2 | DR Congo |
|---|---|---|
| | Report |

Reunification Stadium, Douala

22 February 2025
13:00

| Central African Republic | 1–0 | Gabon |
|---|---|---|
| | Report |

Reunification Stadium, Douala
22 February 2025
16:00

| Cameroon | 6–0 | DR Congo |
|---|---|---|
| | Report |

Reunification Stadium, Douala

== Central-East Zone ==
=== Tiebreakers ===
Teams were ranked according to the three points for a win system (3 points for a win, 1 for a draw, 0 points for a loss), and if two teams were tied on points, the following tiebreaking criteria were applied, in the order given, to determine the rankings (Regulations Article 13):

1. Points in head-to-head matches match between the two tied teams;
2. Goal difference in all group matches;
3. Goals scored in all group matches;
4. Drawing of lots.

If more than two teams were tied, the following criteria were applied instead:

1. Points in matches between the tied teams;
2. Goal difference in matches between the tied teams;
3. Goals scored in matches between the tied teams;
4. If after applying all criteria above, two teams were still tied, the above criteria were again applied to matches played between the two teams in question. If this did not resolve the tie, the next three criteria were applied;
5. Goal difference in all group matches;
6. Goals scored in all group matches;
7. Drawing of lots.

==== Group A ====
| Pos | Team | Pld | W | D | L | GF | GA | GD | Pts | Qualification |
|---|---|---|---|---|---|---|---|---|---|---|
| 1 | Uganda (H) | 2 | 1 | 1 | 0 | 6 | 1 | +5 | 4 | Semi-finals |
| 2 | Tanzania | 2 | 1 | 1 | 0 | 2 | 1 | +1 | 4 | Semi-finals |
| 3 | Kenya | 2 | 0 | 0 | 2 | 0 | 6 | −6 | 0 | |

Source: Soccerway
Rules for classification: Group stage tiebreakers
(H) Hosts
15 December 2024
16:00

| Uganda | 1–1 | Tanzania |
|---|---|---|
| Magala 58' | Report | Ally 19' |

Nakivubo Hamz Stadium, Kampala

18 December 2024
13:00

| Tanzania | 1–0 | Kenya |
|---|---|---|
| Sagwe 19' | Report |

Nakivubo Hamz Stadium, Kampala

21 December 2024
16:00

| Uganda | 5–0 | Kenya |
|---|---|---|
| Bogere 17' (pen.), 42', 58'; Magala 40'; Wanyama 78' | Report |

Nakivubo Hamz Stadium, Kampala

==== Group B ====
| Pos | Team | Pld | W | D | L | GF | GA | GD | Pts | Qualification |
|---|---|---|---|---|---|---|---|---|---|---|
| 1 | South Sudan | 2 | 2 | 0 | 0 | 4 | 0 | +4 | 6 | Semi-finals |
| 2 | Somalia | 2 | 1 | 0 | 1 | 1 | 3 | −2 | 3 | Semi-finals |
| 3 | Sudan | 2 | 0 | 0 | 2 | 0 | 2 | −2 | 0 | |

Source: Soccerway
Rules for classification: Group stage tiebreakers
15 December 2024
13:00

| Somalia | 0–3 | South Sudan |
|---|---|---|
| | Report | Antacio 38'; Jou 45+3'; Laku 72' |

Nakivubo Hamz Stadium, Kampala

18 December 2024
16:00

| South Sudan | 1–0 | Sudan |
|---|---|---|
| Laku 33' | Report |

Nakivubo Hamz Stadium, Kampala

21 December 2024
13:00

| Somalia | 1–0 | Sudan |
|---|---|---|
| S. Mohamed 90+3' | Report |

Nakivubo Hamz Stadium, Kampala

=== Knockout stage ===
==== Bracket ====
Semi-finals
24 December – Kampala
South Sudan | 0
Tanzania | 4
24 December – Kampala
Uganda | 4
Somalia | 1

Final
27 December – Kampala
Tanzania | 1
Uganda | 2
Third place
27 December – Kampala
South Sudan | 2 (2)
Somalia | 2 (4)

==== Semi-finals ====
24 December 2024
13:00

| South Sudan | 0–4 | Tanzania |
|---|---|---|
| | Report | Mbegu 16'; Zamu 32'; Josiah 35'; Abushiri 52' |

Nakivubo Hamz Stadium, Kampala
24 December 2024
16:30

| Uganda | 4–1 | Somalia |
|---|---|---|
| Walisimbi 45'; Bogere 58', 90+3', 90+5' | Report | Osman 70' |

Nakivubo Hamz Stadium, Kampala

==== Third place play-off ====
27 December 2024
12:30

| South Sudan | 2–2 | Somalia |
|---|---|---|
| Genzi 24'; Laku 29' | Report | Genzi 44' (o.g.); Isaq 52' |
Penalties
| Penalty missed Penalty scored | 2–4 | Penalty scored |

Nakivubo Hamz Stadium, Kampala

==== Final ====
27 December 2024
15:30

| Tanzania | 1–2 | Uganda |
|---|---|---|
| Josiah 11' | Report | Nkoola 64'; Bogere 89' |

Nakivubo Hamz Stadium, Kampala

== South Zone ==
The COSAFA qualifiers for the U-17 Africa Cup of Nations were held in Johannesburg, South Africa, from 5 to 14 December 2024. The draw for the groups took place on 5 September 2024.

The qualification structure was as follows:

- Group stage: The 12 teams were divided into three groups, with the group winners and the best runner-up advancing to the knockout stage.
- Knockout stage: The four teams advancing from the second round competed in a three-match knockout round, with the winners of the semifinals qualifying for the final tournament.

=== Group stage ===
Group A
| Pos | Team | Pld | W | D | L | GF | GA | GD | Pts | Qualification |
|---|---|---|---|---|---|---|---|---|---|---|
| 1 | Angola | 3 | 2 | 1 | 0 | 4 | 2 | +2 | 7 | Semi-finals |
| 2 | Mozambique | 3 | 1 | 1 | 1 | 2 | 2 | 0 | 4 | |
| 3 | Lesotho | 3 | 1 | 0 | 2 | 4 | 5 | −1 | 3 | |
| 4 | Malawi | 3 | 0 | 2 | 1 | 4 | 5 | −1 | 2 | |

Source: Soccerway
Rules for classification: Group stage tiebreakers

Group B
| Pos | Team | Pld | W | D | L | GF | GA | GD | Pts | Qualification |
|---|---|---|---|---|---|---|---|---|---|---|
| 1 | Zambia | 3 | 3 | 0 | 0 | 14 | 1 | +13 | 9 | Semi-finals |
| 2 | Zimbabwe | 3 | 1 | 1 | 1 | 10 | 10 | 0 | 4 | Semi-finals |
| 3 | Namibia | 3 | 1 | 1 | 1 | 6 | 13 | −7 | 4 | |
| 4 | Eswatini | 3 | 0 | 0 | 3 | 2 | 8 | −6 | 0 | |

Source: Soccerway
Rules for classification: Group stage tiebreakers

Group C
| Pos | Team | Pld | W | D | L | GF | GA | GD | Pts | Qualification |
|---|---|---|---|---|---|---|---|---|---|---|
| 1 | South Africa (H) | 3 | 3 | 0 | 0 | 10 | 2 | +8 | 9 | Semi-finals |
| 2 | Botswana | 3 | 1 | 1 | 1 | 3 | 5 | −2 | 4 | |
| 3 | Comoros | 3 | 0 | 2 | 1 | 1 | 4 | −3 | 2 | |
| 4 | Mauritius | 3 | 0 | 1 | 2 | 2 | 5 | −3 | 1 | |

Source: Soccerway
Rules for classification: Group stage tiebreakers
(H) Hosts

=== Knockout stage ===
Semi-finals
11 December – Johannesburg
Angola | 2
Zimbabwe | 0
11 December – Johannesburg
Zambia | 2
South Africa | 1

Final
13 December – Johannesburg
Angola | 1
Zambia | 2

== Goalscorers ==
There have been 173 goals scored in 57 matches, for an average of 3.04 goals per match (as of 20 February 2025).

7 goals

- (Zambia) Abel Nyirongo

5 goals

- (Burkina Faso) Asharaf Tapsoba
- (Egypt) Belal Atya
- (Mali) Bakary Simpara
- (Zimbabwe) El Shaddai Sadomba

4 goals

- (Nigeria) Abdulmuiz Adeleke
- (Tunisia) Anisse Saidi

3 goals

- (Egypt) Hamza Abdelkarim
- (Egypt) Mohamed Hamad
- (The Gambia) Francis Gomez
- (Ghana) Harve Gbafa
- (Ghana) Joseph Narbi
- (Lesotho) Rethabile Nqoko
- (Morocco) Ziyad Baha
- (Zambia) Gabriel Phiri
- (Zambia) Mapalo Simute
- (Zimbabwe) Valentine Macheka

2 goals

- (Algeria) Youcef Boudouab
- (Angola) Eliseu
- (Egypt) Abdelaziz El Zoghbi
- (Botswana) Kgosi Tshidi
- (The Gambia) Alagie Baba Leigh
- (Ghana) Mark Kagawa Mensah
- (Ivory Coast) Youbah Coulibaly
- (Libya) Sanad Abdulwahab
- (Malawi) James Lumbe
- (Mali) Soungalo Coulibaly
- (Mali) Seydou Dembélé
- (Morocco) Ismail El Aoud
- (Namibia) Brayton Paulse
- (Niger) Undefined
- (Nigeria) Rapha Adams
- (Senegal) Mouhamed Dabo
- (Senegal) El Hadji Yamar Ndiaye
- (South Africa) Neo Bohloko
- (South Africa) Kamohelo Maraletse
- (South Africa) Omphemetse Sekgoto
- (South Africa) Selwyn Stevens
- (Zimbabwe) Tadiwa Chakuchichi

1 goal

- (Algeria) Ahmed Achouri
- (Algeria) Charaf Eddine Cherfaoui
- (Algeria) Benaissa Fettouche
- (Angola) Densel
- (Angola) Jario
- (Angola) Dias Luvumbo
- (Angola) Omar
- (Botswana) Kutlo Mananye
- (Burkina Faso) Abdoulaye Diaby
- (Burkina Faso) Ibrouahima Fofana
- (Burkina Faso) Chérif Sawadogo
- (Comoros) Kaylan Saïd
- (Eswatini) Aviwe Dlamini
- (Eswatini) Menzi Dlamini
- (The Gambia) Bubacarr Susso
- (Ghana) Theophilus Ayamga
- (Ghana) Godfred Sarpong
- (Guinea-Bissau) José Júnior
- (Ivory Coast) Adama Diabate
- (Ivory Coast) Mohammed Diarra
- (Lesotho) Thuto Khetsi
- (Liberia) Alex Wile
- (Libya) Almonder Al-Gamati
- (Libya) Anas El Shawish
- (Malawi) Clifford Chisale
- (Malawi) Yusufu Nantunga
- (Mali) Aboubacar Camara
- (Mali) Ibrahim Diakité
- (Mali) Mahamadou Traoré
- (Mauritius) Julian Rabaye
- (Mauritius) Aldo Ravina
- (Morocco) Ilies Belmokhtar
- (Morocco) Adam Jout
- (Morocco) Ahmed Mawhoub
- (Morocco) Abdellah Ouazane
- (Morocco) Bilal Sokrate
- (Mozambique) Kille Lino
- (Mozambique) Levonor Timbe
- (Namibia) Andriano Gawab
- (Namibia) Stephen Kamulu
- (Namibia) Ronald Kandjou
- (Namibia) Christiano Useb
- (Niger) Undefined
- (Nigeria) Imrana Muhammad
- (Senegal) Elhadji Cissé
- (Senegal) Youssou Mané
- (Senegal) Etienne Mendy
- (Senegal) El Hadji Sow
- (Sierra Leone) Alie Kabia
- (South Africa) Simphiwe Mlondo
- (South Africa) Sive Pama
- (South Africa) Emile Witbooi
- (Togo) Parkouda Bassirou
- (Togo) Joël Tekle Eklou
- (Tunisia) Aziz Chaabene
- (Tunisia) Saifedine Haj Abdallah
- (Tunisia) Amenallah Touati
- (Zambia) Robert Banda
- (Zambia) Nkotami Chimwemwe
- (Zambia) Jonathan Kalimina
- (Zambia) Nthasilwe Malupande

1 own goal

- (Liberia) Cassius Pewee (against Gambia)
- (Namibia) Milko Solunga (against Zambia)
- (Zambia) Jonathan Kalimina (against Angola)

== See also ==
- 2025 U-20 Africa Cup of Nations qualification
