= COSAFA U-17 Youth Championship =

Football tournament in Southern Africa

- Founded: 1994; 32 years ago
- Region: Southern Africa
- Teams: 12 (as of 2024)
- Qualifier for: U-17 Africa Cup of Nations
- Current champions: South Africa (4th title)
- Most championships: South Africa; Zambia (4 titles)
- Broadcaster(s): COSAFA TV (YouTube); FIFA+
- Website: COSAFA.com
- 2025 COSAFA Under-17 Championship

The COSAFA U-17 Youth Championship, also known as the COSAFA U-17 Men's Championship, is an international youth football championship organised by COSAFA for the men's under-17 national teams of Southern Africa.

South Africa and Zambia are the most successful teams in this competition, having won four titles each. Amajimbos are the current champions.

== History ==
Established in 1994, the first regional under-17 championship was held in South Africa, featuring nine teams, and was won by the host nation's Amajimbos. The competition would not be held again for another seven years, returning in 2001 in Malawi, with Blantyre and Lilongwe serving as host cities. Malawi emerged victorious on home soil, defeating the defending champions South Africa 3–0 in the final. In the following year's edition, the number of participants dropped to four, with a round-robin format. South Africa went on to be crowned champions, claiming their second title again the tournament went on a hiatus for five years and returned in 2007, with 10 teams participating. Zimbabwe claimed their first title by defeating two-time champions South Africa in a penalty shootout. After a nine-year absence, the tournament was revived in 2016 and has been held annually since then. Hosted in Mauritius, Namibia became the fourth team to lift the trophy, defeating the most successful team at the time, South Africa in a penalty shootout. The following year, Zambia joined the list of winning teams by defeating host nation Mauritius 3–0 in the final. In 2018, the tournament became the regional qualifier for the continental U-17 Africa Cup of Nations. Angola won their first trophy and along with South Africa qualified for the continental finals.

== Format ==
The format of the tournament has varied across editions, depending on the number of teams participating. When fewer than six teams entered, the tournament typically followed a single round-robin format, with an optional final between the top two teams. If six or more teams participated, the competition was held in two stages: a group stage with a single round-robin format, where each team played against the others in their group, with the top four teams across all groups advancing to the semi-finals. A final and a third-place match were then held, though the third-place match was removed starting in 2024.

== Participation ==
The competition is open to all 14 COSAFA members, as well as the COSAFA associate member, Réunion. Similar to other COSAFA tournaments, The competition was previously open to CECAFA members, who were invited to participate when the tournament did not serve as a qualifier for the finals.

== Results ==
Ed.	Year	Host	Final			Third place game			Num. teams
Ed.	Year	Host	(gold) Champions	Score	(silver) Runners-up	(bronze) Third place	Score	Fourth place	Num. teams
1	1994	South Africa	South Africa	2–1	Mozambique	Zambia	1–0	Zimbabwe	9
2	2001	Malawi	Malawi	3–0	South Africa	Zambia	1–0	Swaziland	11
3	2002	South Africa	South Africa	Round-robin	Swaziland	Botswana	Round-robin	Lesotho	4
4	2007	Namibia	Zimbabwe	1–1 (4–2 p)	South Africa	Zambia	1–0	Malawi	10
5	2016	Mauritius	Namibia	1–1 (3–1 p)	South Africa	Malawi	2–0	Kenya	7
6	2017	Mauritius	Zambia	3–0	Mauritius	Malawi	2–1	South Africa	8
7	2018	Mauritius	Angola	1–0	South Africa	Namibia	2–1	Mauritius	12
8	2019	Malawi	Zambia	2–0	Mozambique	Angola	5–0	Eswatini	8
9	2020	South Africa	South Africa	1–1 (4–2 p)	Zambia	Angola	2–1	Malawi	4
10	2021	Lesotho	Angola	2–1	Zambia	Malawi	4–0	Eswatini	6
11	2022	Malawi	Zambia	1–0	South Africa	Malawi	5–2	Botswana	7
Ed.	Year	Host	Final			Losing semi-finalists			Num. teams
Ed.	Year	Host	(gold) Champions	Score	(silver) Runners-up	Losing semi-finalists			Num. teams
12	2024	South Africa	Zambia	2–1	Angola	South Africa	and	Zimbabwe	12
Ed.	Year	Host	Final			Third place game			Num. teams
Ed.	Year	Host	(gold) Champions	Score	(silver) Runners-up	(bronze) Third place	Score	Fourth place	Num. teams
12	2025	Zimbabwe	South Africa	2–1	Angola	Mozambique	3–0	Comoros	12
COSAFA Under-17 Championship archive on the RSSSF's website

== Medals ==
Rank	Nation	Gold	Silver	Bronze	Total
1	South Africa	4	5	1	10
2	Zambia	4	2	3	9
3	Angola	2	2	2	6
4	Malawi	1	0	4	5
5	Namibia	1	0	1	2
5	Zimbabwe	1	0	1	2
7	Mozambique	0	2	1	3
8	Eswatini	0	1	0	1
8	Mauritius	0	1	0	1
10	Botswana	0	0	1	1
Totals (10 entries)		13	13	14	40

- 2024 Bronze Shared

== Participating nations ==
=== Comprehensive team results by tournament ===
Legend:

- 1st – Champion
- 2nd – 2nd
- 3rd – 3rd
- 4th – 4th
- SF – Semi-finalists
- QF – Quarter finals
- GS – Group stage
- P – Participating in the upcoming tournament.
- DQ – Disqualified
- •• – Entered but withdrew
- • – Did not enter
- × – Banned by FIFA/ Entry not accepted by COSAFA
- — Country not affiliated to COSAFA

Nation	1994	2001	2002	2007	2016	2017	2018	2019	2020	2021	2022	2024	Total
Angola	•	GS	•	GS	•	•	1st	3rd	3rd	1st	•	2nd	7
Botswana	GS	GS	3rd	GS	•	GS	GS	•	DQ	GS	4th	GS	9
Comoros	•	•	•	•	•	•	•	GS	DQ	•	•	GS	2
Eswatini	GS	4th	2nd	GS	•	•	GS	4th	DQ	4th	•	GS	8
Lesotho	GS	GS	4th	GS	•	•	GS	GS	•	GS	•	GS	8
Madagascar	•	GS	•	•	GS	GS	•	•	•	•	•	•	3
Malawi	GS	1st	•	4th	3rd	3rd	GS	GS	4th	3rd	3rd	GS	11
Mauritius	•	GS	•	GS	GS	2nd	4th	•	•	•	•	GS	6
Mozambique	2nd	DQ	•	•	•	GS	GS	2nd	•	•	GS	GS	6
Namibia	GS	GS	•	GS	1st	•	3rd	•	•	•	GS	GS	7
Seychelles	•	•	•	•	GS	•	GS	•	•	•	GS	•	3
South Africa	1st	2nd	1st	2nd	2nd	4th	2nd	GS	1st	•	2nd	SF	11
Zambia	3rd	3rd	•	3rd	DQ	1st	GS	1st	2nd	2nd	1st	1st	10
Zimbabwe	4th	GS	•	1st	•	GS	GS	•	DQ	•	•	SF	6
Guest nations
Kenya	—	—	—	—	4th	—	—	—	—	—	—	—	1

== Awards ==
Tournament	Player of the Tournament	Golden Boot	Goals	Golden Glove	Fair Play Trophy
1994 South Africa		(South Africa) Junaid Hartley	7		
2001 Malawi		(Malawi) Robert Ng'ambi	4		
2002 South Africa		(South Africa) Lebogang Mokoena	6		
2007 Namibia					
2016 Mauritius		(Malawi) Peter Banda	5		
2017 Mauritius	(Mauritius) Yannick Aristide	(Zambia) Martin Njobvu	6	(Malawi) Kennedy Nankhaima	
2018 Mauritius	(Angola) Zito Luvumbo	(Namibia) Prins Tjiueza	6		
2019 Malawi	(Zambia) Moses Mulenga	(Mozambique) Simon Cipriano (Angola) Miro (Zambia) Rickson Ng'ambi	5	(Zambia) Iford Mwale	Eswatini
2020 South Africa	(South Africa) Mduduzi Shabalala	(Zambia) Joseph Banda	5	(Zambia) Eric Makungu	Zambia
2021 Lesotho	(Zambia) Joseph Banda	(Malawi) Masambiro Kalua (Zambia) Joseph Banda	5	(Angola) Ariola	Eswatini
2022 Malawi	(South Africa) Siyabonga Mabena	(South Africa) Siyabonga Mabena	9	(South Africa) Gennaro Johnson	Botswana
2024 South Africa	(Zambia) Mapalo Simute	(Zambia) Abel Nyirongo	7	(Angola) Gelson Dala	Angola
2025 Zimbabwe	(South Africa) Omphemetse Sekgoto	(Angola) Pedro Antonio	8	(Angola) Gelson Dala	Mozambique
