= 2022 COSAFA Under-17 Championship =

Tournament details
- Host country: Malawi
- Dates: 2–11 December 2022
- Teams: 7 (from 1 sub-confederation)
- Venue: 1 (in 1 host city)

Final positions
- Champions: Zambia (3rd title)
- Runners-up: South Africa
- Third place: Malawi
- Fourth place: Botswana

Tournament statistics
- Matches played: 13
- Goals scored: 50 (3.85 per match)
- Top scorer(s): (South Africa) Siyabonga Mabena (9 goals)

The 2022 COSAFA Under-17 Championship was the 11th edition of the COSAFA U-17 Championship, a football tournament organized by the Council of Southern Africa Football Associations (COSAFA) involving teams from Southern Africa for players aged 17 and below. Malawi was the host of tournament from 2–11 December 2022.

Angola was the defending champion, by defeating Zambia 2–1 in the final on 7 December 2021.

== Participating nations ==
The following seven teams are contesting in the tournament.

Teams	Appearance	Best Performance
Botswana	8	Third place (2002)
Malawi	10	Champions (2001)
Mozambique	5	Runners-up (1994, 2019)
Namibia	6	Champions (2016)
Seychelles	3	Group stage (2016, 2018)
South Africa	10	Champions (1994, 2002, 2020)
Zambia	10	Champions (2017, 2019)

== Venue ==
All matches were played at these ground in Malawi.

Lilongwe	2022 COSAFA Under-17 Championship (Malawi)
Bingu National Stadium	2022 COSAFA Under-17 Championship (Malawi)
Capacity: 41,100	2022 COSAFA Under-17 Championship (Malawi)

== Draw ==
The draw for the tournament was held on 4 November 2022 at Lilongwe, Malawi. The seven teams were divided into two groups; the top two teams from each group entered the Semi-finals.

== Group summary ==
Group A	Group B
Botswana; Malawi; Namibia	Mozambique; Seychelles; South Africa; Zambia

== Group stages ==
=== Group A ===
Pos	Team	Pld	W	D	L	GF	GA	GD	Pts	Qualification
1	Malawi (H)	2	1	1	0	4	3	+1	4	Semi-finals
2	Botswana	2	1	1	0	3	2	+1	4	Semi-finals
3	Namibia	2	0	0	2	1	3	−2	0	

Source: GSA
(H) Hosts
2 December 2022
20:00

Malawi	2–2	Botswana
Harrison 32'; Mhango 64'	Report	Ratshukudu 11'; Banda 47' (o.g.)

Bingu National Stadium, Lilongwe
Referee: Njaka Raharimanantsoa (Madagascar)

4 December 2022
15:30

Malawi	2–1	Namibia
Kanowa 37' (pen.); Mzunda 83'	Report	Nanuseb 27'

Bingu National Stadium, Lilongwe
Referee: Wilson Muianga (Mozambique)

6 December 2022
13:40

Namibia	0–1	Botswana
	Report	Ratshukudu 72'

Bingu National Stadium, Lilongwe
Referee: Darrio Landry (Seychelles)

=== Group B ===
Pos	Team	Pld	W	D	L	GF	GA	GD	Pts	Qualification
1	Zambia	3	3	0	0	9	1	+8	9	Semi-finals
2	South Africa	3	2	0	1	12	1	+11	6	Semi-finals
3	Mozambique	3	0	1	2	0	2	−2	1	
4	Seychelles	3	0	1	2	1	18	−17	1	

Source: GSA
3 December 2022
15:30

Seychelles	0–11	South Africa
	Report	Mabena 4', 9', 26', 45+2', 74'; Lee 10'; Mokoena 25'; Wallis 48', 52', 90+2' (pen.); Manyana 57'

Bingu National Stadium, Lilongwe
Referee: Thokozani Dlamini (Eswatini)
3 December 2022
18:30

Zambia	1–0	Mozambique
Zimba 55'	Report

Bingu National Stadium, Lilongwe
Referee: Godfrey Nkhakananga (Malawi)

5 December 2022
15:30

Mozambique	0–1	South Africa
	Report	Mabena 62'

Bingu National Stadium, Lilongwe
Referee: Thembinkosi Dlamini (Eswatini)
5 December 2022
18:30

Zambia	7–1	Seychelles
Mwanza 33', 42', 74', 86', 90'; Kapowa 37'; Phiri 64'	Report	Hoareau 77'

Bingu National Stadium, Lilongwe
Referee: Eness Gumbo (Malawi)

7 December 2022
19:00

Seychelles	0–0	Mozambique
	Report

Bingu National Stadium, Lilongwe
Referee: Samuel Nghipandulwa (Namibia)
7 December 2022
21:30

South Africa	0–1	Zambia
	Report	Zimba 49'

Bingu National Stadium, Lilongwe
Referee: Wilson Muianga (Mozambique)

== Knockout stage ==
- In the knockout stage, extra-time and a penalty shoot-out will be used to decide the winner if necessary.

=== Bracket ===
Semi-finals
9 December – Bingu National
Zambia	4
Botswana	2
9 December – Bingu National
Malawi	1
South Africa	5

Final
11 December – Bingu National
Zambia	1
South Africa	0
Third place
11 December – Bingu National
Botswana	2
Malawi	5

=== Semi-finals ===
9 December 2022
18:30

Zambia	4–2	Botswana
Malaya 31'; Kapowa 45', 86'; Zimba 70'	Report	Manapolo 51' (pen.); Ratshukudu 58'

Bingu National Stadium, Lilongwe
Referee: Godfrey Nkhakananga (Malawi)
9 December 2022
21:30

Malawi	1–5	South Africa
Mkandawire 52'	Report	Sibiya 31'; Mabena 46', 86' (pen.), 90'; Lee 74'

Bingu National Stadium, Lilongwe
Referee: Wilson Muianga (Mozambique)

=== Third place match ===
11 December 2022
12:00

Botswana	2–5	Malawi
Ratshukudu 58'; Matakula 79'	Report	Mkandawire 4'; Mzunda 20', 66', 90'; Harrison 42'

Bingu National Stadium, Lilongwe
Referee: Wilson Muianga (Mozambique)

=== Final ===
11 December 2022
17:30

Zambia	1–0	South Africa
Phiri 60'	Report

Bingu National Stadium, Lilongwe
Referee: Godfrey Nkhakananga (Malawi)

== Awards ==
11th COSAFA Under-17 Championship 2022
Winners
Zambia
Third Title

== Statistics ==
=== Goalscorers ===
There were 50 goals scored in 13 matches, for an average of 3.85 goals per match.

9 goals

- (South Africa) Siyabonga Mabena

5 goals

- (Zambia) Emmanuel Mwanza

4 goals

- (Botswana) Losika Ratshukudu
- (Malawi) Webster Mzunda

3 goals

- (South Africa) Benjamin Wallis
- (Zambia) Lutetekelo Kapowa
- (Zambia) Marcel Zimba

2 goals

- (Malawi) Vincent Harrison
- (Malawi) Lucky Mkandawire
- (South Africa) Dhakier Lee
- (Zambia) Kelvin Phiri

1 goal

- (Botswana) Boniface Manapolo
- (Botswana) Boikobo Matakula
- (Malawi) Blessings Kanowa
- (Malawi) Mwisho Mhango
- (Namibia) Dorian Nanuseb
- (Seychelles) Lorenzo Hoareau
- (South Africa) Xhosa Manyana
- (South Africa) Bennet Mokoena
- (South Africa) Thato Sibiya
- (Zambia) Samson Malaya

1 own goal

- (Malawi) Julius Banda (against Botswana)

Source: COSOFA
