= 2021 COSAFA Under-17 Championship =

Tournament details
- Host country: Lesotho
- Dates: 1–8 December 2021
- Teams: 6 (from 1 sub-confederation)
- Venue: 1 (in 1 host city)

Final positions
- Champions: Angola (2nd title)
- Runners-up: Zambia
- Third place: Malawi
- Fourth place: Eswatini

Tournament statistics
- Matches played: 10
- Goals scored: 29 (2.9 per match)
- Top scorer(s): (Zambia) Joseph Banda (Malawi) Masambiro Kalua (5)
- Best player: (Zambia) Joseph Banda
- Best goalkeeper: (Angola) Domingos Da Silva
- Fair play award: Eswatini

The 2021 COSAFA Under-17 Championship was the 10th edition of the COSAFA U-17 Championship, a football tournament organized by the Council of Southern Africa Football Associations (COSAFA) involving teams from Southern Africa for players aged 17 and below. Lesotho hosted the tournament for the first time as an integrated part of the 2020 African Union Sports Council Games. Angola were the eventual winners for the second time.

== Participating teams ==
- Angola
- Botswana
- Eswatini
- Lesotho
- Malawi
- Zambia

== Group stage ==
=== Group A ===
Pos	Team	Pld	W	D	L	GF	GA	GD	Pts	Qualification
1	Zambia	2	2	0	0	3	0	+3	6	Semi-finals
2	Eswatini	2	0	1	1	1	2	−1	1	Semi-finals
3	Lesotho	2	0	1	1	1	3	−2	1	

Updated to match(es) played on 6 December. Source: COSAFA.com
1 December 2021

Lesotho	0–2	Zambia
	Report	J. Banda 29', 71'

Setsotso Stadium, Maseru, Lesotho
4 December 2021

Eswatini	0–1	Zambia
	Report	J. Banda 87'

Setsotso Stadium, Maseru, Lesotho
6 December 2021

Lesotho	1–1	Eswatini
Seabata 78'	Report	Majara 24' (o.g.)

Setsotso Stadium, Maseru, Lesotho

=== Group B ===
Pos	Team	Pld	W	D	L	GF	GA	GD	Pts	Qualification
1	Angola	2	2	0	0	6	2	+4	6	Semi-finals
2	Malawi	2	0	1	1	3	5	−2	1	Semi-finals
3	Botswana	2	0	1	1	1	3	−2	1	

Updated to match(es) played on 6 December. Source: COSAFA.com
1 December 2021

Botswana	1–1	Malawi
Kaku 77' (pen.)	Report	Mwachumu 6'

Setsotso Stadium, Maseru, Lesotho
4 December 2021

Angola	2–0	Botswana
Antonio 8'; Mkokissa 90' (pen.)	Report

Setsotso Stadium, Maseru, Lesotho
5 December 2021

Angola	4–2	Malawi
Antonio 6'; Mkokissa 24'; Brito 38'; Pedro 67'	Report	Kalua 11', 20'

Setsotso Stadium, Maseru, Lesotho

== Knockout stage ==
Semi-finals
7 December – Setsotso Stadium
Zambia	3
Malawi	1
7 December – Setsotso Stadium
Angola	3
Eswatini	0

Final
8 December – Setsotso Stadium
Zambia	1
Angola	2
Third place
7 December – Setsotso Stadium
Malawi	4
Eswatini	0

=== Semi-finals ===
7 December 2021

Zambia	3–1	Malawi
J. Banda 50', 89'; M. Banda 58'	Report	Kanowa 70'

Setsotso Stadium, Maseru, Lesotho
7 December 2021

Angola	3–0	Eswatini
Antonio 40'; Mkokissa 48'; Hekele 54'	Report

Setsotso Stadium, Maseru, Lesotho

=== Third place ===
7 December 2021

Malawi	4–0	Eswatini
Kalua 13', 40', 58'; Chuzu 90'	Report

Setsotso Stadium, Maseru, Lesotho

=== Final ===
8 December 2021

Zambia	1–2	Angola
Zimba 13'	Report	Eusebio 11', 89'

Setsotso Stadium, Maseru, Lesotho

== Awards ==
- Most Valuable Player: (Zambia) Joseph Banda
- Top Scorer: (Zambia) Joseph Banda and (Malawi) Masambiro Kalua (5 each)
- Top Goalkeeper: (Angola) Domingos Da Silva
- Fair Play: Eswatini
