= 2020 COSAFA Under-17 Championship =

Tournament details
- Host country: South Africa
- Dates: 19–29 November 2020
- Teams: 4

Final positions
- Champions: South Africa (3rd title)
- Runners-up: Zambia
- Third place: Angola
- Fourth place: Malawi

Tournament statistics
- Matches played: 8
- Goals scored: 32 (4 per match)
- Top scorer: (Zambia) Joseph Banda
- Best player: (South Africa) Mduduzi Shabalala
- Best goalkeeper: (Zambia) Eric Makungu
- Fair play award: Zambia

The 2020 COSAFA Under-17 Championship is the 9th edition of the COSAFA U-17 Championship, a football tournament organized by the Council of Southern Africa Football Associations (COSAFA) involving teams from Southern Africa for players aged 17 and below. The tournament is also the qualifier for the 2021 Africa U-17 Cup of Nations, which in turn is the qualifier for the 2021 FIFA U-17 World Cup and will be played on November 19–29 in Nelson Mandela Bay and the two finalists of the tournament will be representing COSAFA in the Africa U-17 Cup of Nations. Initially, it was planned to be played in Malawi in July but was postponed due to the COVID-19 pandemic. After the first four games, (2 in each group), the tournament was re-started as four teams (Comoros, Zimbabwe, Botswana, Eswatini) were disqualified for using over-aged players.

== Participating teams ==
Last year's runners-up Mozambique were meant to be the 9th nation to participate, but in the end 8 of the 14 COSAFA teams entered to compete for this year's trophy. After the first round of games four teams were expelled due to cheating, namely:

- Comoros
- Zimbabwe
- Botswana
- Eswatini

So the tournament restarted with the following genuine combatants:

- Angola
- Malawi
- South Africa (Hosts)
- Zambia (Defending champions)

== Match Officials ==
Referees

- Audrick Nkole (Zambia)
- (Ms) Vistoria Nuusiku Shangula (Namibia)
- Godfrey Nkhakananga (Malawi)
- Thulani Sibandze (Eswatini)
- (South Africa) Luxolo Badi (South Africa)
- Lawrence Zimondi (Zimbabwe)
- Tshepo Mokani Gobagoba (Botswana)
- Artur Adriano Alfinar (Mozambique)
- (Ms) Thank Nyahuye (Zimbabwe)

Assistant Referees

- (Ms) Mercy Zulu (Zambia)
- Thomas Kaela (Zambia)
- (Ms) Buyisile Patricia Mkhaliphi (Eswatini)
- Venestancio Cossa (Mozambique)
- Tafadzwa Nkala (Zimbabwe)
- Lucky Kegakologetswe (Botswana)
- Shaun Siza Dlangamandla (Lesotho)

== Group stage ==
Pos	Team	Pld	W	D	L	GF	GA	GD	Pts	Qualification
1	Zambia (H)	3	3	0	0	9	3	+6	9	2021 Africa U-17 Cup of Nations
2	South Africa	3	1	1	1	4	4	0	4	2021 Africa U-17 Cup of Nations
3	Angola	3	1	0	2	9	5	+4	3	
4	Malawi	3	0	1	2	5	15	−10	1	

Source: COSAFA
Rules for classification: Group tiebreakers
(H) Hosts
22 November 2020
12:30

Angola	1–2	Zambia
Lopes 90+3'	Report	Majapa 51'; Ng’ambi 64' (pen.)

Gelvandale Stadium, Nelson Mandela Bay
Referee: Tshepo Gobagoba (Botswana)
22 November 2020
15:30

South Africa	2–2	Malawi
Shabalala 46'; Mahlangu 87'	Report	Zakeyu 36'; Banda 65'

Gelvandale Stadium, Nelson Mandela Bay
Referee: Thanks Nyahuye (Zimbabwe)

24 November 2020
12:30

South Africa	2–1	Angola
Shabalala 45+2'; Francis 61'	Report	Kossi 56'

Gelvandale Stadium, Nelson Mandela Bay
Referee: Lawrence Zimondi (Zimbabwe)
24 November 2020
15:30

Zambia	6–2	Malawi
Banda 11', 44', 49'; Ng’ambi 16'; Majapa 47'; Khumalo 84'	Report	Mphasi 58', 72'

Gelvandale Stadium, Nelson Mandela Bay
Referee: Artur Alfinar (Mozambique)

26 November 2020
15:30

Malawi	1–7	Angola
Zakeyu 80'	Report	Domingos 30'; Hequele 40', 42', 67' (pen.); Canji 82'; Cucao 90+1'; Inga 90+4'

Westbourne Oval Stadium, Nelson Mandela Bay
Referee: Luxolo Badi (South Africa)
26 November 2020
15:30

Zambia	1–0	South Africa
Banda 84'	Report

Gelvandale Stadium, Nelson Mandela Bay
Referee: Thulani Sibandze (Eswatini)

=== Third place match ===
29 November 2020
10:00

Angola	2–1	Malawi
Kossi 9'; Hequele 41'	Report	Lameck 1'

Gelvandale Stadium, Nelson Mandela Bay
Referee: Vistoria Shangula (Namibia)

=== Final ===
29 November 2020
15:00

Zambia	1–1	South Africa
Banda 2' (pen.)	Report	Mahlangu 14' (pen.)
Penalties
Chaiwa (penalty missed); Banda (penalty scored); Majapa (penalty scored); Ng’ambi (penalty missed)	2–4	(penalty scored) Sishi; (penalty missed) Mgiba; (penalty scored) Phalane; (penalty scored) Dopolo; (penalty scored) Dithejane

Gelvandale Stadium, Nelson Mandela Bay
Referee: Artur Alfinar (Mozambique)

== Qualification for CAF Cup of Nations ==
The two finalists of the tournament will qualify for the 2021 Africa U-17 Cup of Nations. Qualified nations:

Nation	Previous participation	Best result
Zambia	2015	Group Stage
South Africa	2005, 2007, 2015	Silver medalists

== Champion ==
2020 COSAFA Under-17 champion

South Africa
Third title

== Top Scorers ==
Representing	Player	Goals
(Zambia)	Joseph Banda	5
(Angola)	Custódio Hequele	4

== COSAFA-La Liga partnership ==
South Africa's Mduduzi Shabalala and Zambia's Joseph Banda was selected by the Technical Study Group to be traveling to Spain for a LaLiga development experience, where they will get the opportunity to observe the football life in Spain and train with a local team. The duo become the first players along with their two counterparts from 2020 COSAFA Women's U17 Championship to get this opportunity on account of the new formalization of the partnership between COSAFA and La Liga to boost Southern African football

== Disqualification ==
Prior the tournament, CAF scanned all players with MRI, to make sure that everyone was eligible for the age-category. In the tournament regulations there is stated that the scanning will take place and a team that have players that do not pass the eligibility test will be disqualified and sent home as soon as possible. The test that is used world wide to measure eligibility for U17 tournaments focus on bone fusions in the wrist that are unlikely (with 99% accuracy rate) to appear before the age of 17.

Comoros, Zimbabwe, Botswana, Eswatini, were all found to have one or more players too old to participate in the tournament whereby the teams were disqualified. Because of this, it was decided to re-start the tournament with the other four teams and regard the already played games as warm-up for the tournament without any result value. The tournament were decided to be played as a round-robin where the top two qualify for the final (as well as the 2021 Africa U-17 Cup of Nations) and the bottom two qualify for the bronze medal game.

== Original draw ==
The teams were on 2 November drawn from 2 different pots, as the top-seeded teams were placed in one group each. After drawing the first two teams from pot 1 the last team were put together with the teams from pot 2 to draw the last two teams to each group.

Top seeded	Pot 1	Pot 2
Zambia (2019 Champions) South Africa (Hosts)	Angola Botswana Malawi	Eswatini Comoros Zimbabwe

== Abandoned Group stage ==
=== Group A ===
Pos	Team	Pld	W	D	L	GF	GA	GD	Pts	Qualification
1	South Africa (H)	1	1	0	0	2	0	+2	3	Semi-finals
2	Angola	1	0	1	0	1	1	0	1	Semi-finals
3	Zimbabwe (D)	1	0	1	0	1	1	0	1	
4	Eswatini (D)	1	0	0	1	0	2	−2	0	

Updated to match(es) played on November 19. Source: COSAFA.com
(D) Disqualified; (H) Hosts
19 November 2020
12:30

Zimbabwe	1–1	Angola
Chiwashira 5' (pen.)	Report	Lopes 45' (pen.)

Gelvandale Stadium
Referee: Vistoria Nuusiku Shangula (Namibia)
19 November 2020
15:30

South Africa	2–0	Eswatini
Mahlangu 38'; Phalane 78' (pen.)	Report

Gelvandale Stadium
Referee: Audrick Nkole (Zambia)

=== Group B ===
Pos	Team	Pld	W	D	L	GF	GA	GD	Pts	Qualification
1	Zambia	1	1	0	0	2	0	+2	3	Semi-finals
2	Botswana (D)	1	0	1	0	2	2	0	1	
3	Malawi	1	0	1	0	2	2	0	1	Semi-finals
4	Comoros (D)	1	0	0	1	0	2	−2	0	

Updated to match(es) played on November 20. Source: COSAFA.com
(D) Disqualified
20 November 2020
12:30

Malawi	2–2	Botswana
Mapulanga 12'; Chiwanda 90'	Report	Thlowe 45+2'; Kgaolo 82'

Gelvandale Stadium
Referee: Luxolo Badi (South Africa)
20 November 2020
15:30

Zambia	2–0	Comoros
Mumba 31'; Banda ?'	Report

Gelvandale Stadium
Referee: Thulani Sibandze (Eswatini)

== Abandoned Knockout stage ==
Semi-finals
27 November – Gelvandale Stadium
Group B winner
Group A runners-up
27 November – Gelvandale Stadium
Group A winner
Group B runners-up

Final
29 November – Gelvandale Stadium
Third place
29 November – Gelvandale Stadium
