= Kelvin Maseko =

Zimbabwean footballer

Personal information
- Position: Midfielder

Senior career*
Years	Team	Apps	(Gls)
–2002	Railstars F.C.		
2003–2004	Njube Sundowns F.C.		
2005–2008	Railstars F.C.		
2008	BMC Lobatse		

International career
- Zimbabwe U17
2004	Zimbabwe	1	(0)
- * Club domestic league appearances and goals

Kelvin Maseko is a retired Zimbabwean football midfielder.

He spent most of his career at Railstars F.C., helping in promotion to Zimbabwe's top flight in 1997. The team was relegated after the 2006 season, and in January 2008 he moved abroad to play in Botswana.

At the youth international level he played in the 1994 COSAFA U-17 Tournament, scoring two goals.
