= 2017 COSAFA Under-17 Championship =

Tournament details
- Host country: Mauritius
- Dates: 21-30 July 2017
- Teams: 8 (from 2 sub-confederations)
- Venue: 2 (in 2 host cities)

Final positions
- Champions: Zambia (1st title)
- Runners-up: Mauritius
- Third place: Malawi
- Fourth place: South Africa

Tournament statistics
- Matches played: 16
- Goals scored: 54 (3.38 per match)
- Top scorer: Martin Njobvu (ZAM)
- Best player: Yannick Aristide (MRI)
- Best goalkeeper: Kennedy Nankhaima (MWI)

The 2017 COSAFA Under-17 Championship is the 6th edition of the COSAFA U-17 Championship, an association football tournament organised by the Council of Southern Africa Football Associations (COSAFA) involving teams from Southern Africa for players aged 17 and below. It will take place in Mauritius in July 2017.

== Participating teams ==
- Botswana
- Mauritius
- Malawi
- Madagascar
- Mozambique
- South Africa
- Zambia
- Zimbabwe

== Draw ==
The group stage draw took place on 15 June 2017.

== Venues ==
Port Louis	Quatre Bornes
Stade St. François Xavier	MFA Technical Center
20.1537926°S 57.5140796°E	20.2537214°S 57.4955964°E

== Group stage ==
=== Group A ===
Pos	Team	Pld	W	D	L	GF	GA	GD	Pts	Qualification
1	Malawi	3	3	0	0	9	0	+9	9	Advance to semi-finals
2	Mauritius	3	2	0	1	3	3	0	6	Advance to semi-finals
3	Botswana	3	1	0	2	3	5	−2	3	
4	Zimbabwe	3	0	0	3	1	8	−7	0	

Updated to match(es) played on July 2017. Source: COSAFA
22 July 2017
12:00

Botswana	0-2	Malawi
	Report	Maonga 15'; Willard 59'

Stade St. François Xavier, Port Louis
Referee: Celso Alvacao (Mozambique)
22 July 2017
15:30

Mauritius	1-0	Zimbabwe
Philibert 22'	Report

Stade St. François Xavier, Port Louis
Referee: Jelly Chavani (South Africa)

24 July 2017
12:30

Zimbabwe	0-5	Malawi
	Report	Titani 16'; Maonga 42', 62'; Mbeta 47'; Mwaungulu 90'+1'

Stade St. François Xavier, Port Louis
Referee: Jelly Chavani (South Africa)
24 July 2017
15:30

Mauritius	2-1	Botswana
Chiu Chung Fat 28'; Aristide 63'	Report	Tauyatswala 20'

Stade St. François Xavier, Port Louis
Referee: Celso Alvacao (Mozambique)

26 July 2017
15:00

Zimbabwe	1-2	Botswana
Benza 60'	Report	Bogosi 76', 90+2'

MFA Technical Center, Quatre Bornes
Referee: Celso Alvacao (Mozambique)
26 July 2017
15:00

Malawi	2-0	Mauritius
	Report	Mwaungulu 16'; Balakasi 73'

Stade St. François Xavier, Port Louis
Referee: Andofetra Rakotojaona (Madagascar)

=== Group B ===
Pos	Team	Pld	W	D	L	GF	GA	GD	Pts	Qualification
1	Zambia	3	2	0	1	10	4	+6	6	Advance to semi-finals
2	South Africa	3	2	0	1	10	7	+3	6	Advance to semi-finals
3	Mozambique	3	2	0	1	4	3	+1	6	
4	Madagascar	3	0	0	3	4	14	−10	0	

Updated to match(es) played on July 2017. Source: COSAFA
21 July 2017
12:30

South Africa	3-1	Mozambique
Shahabodien 17', 38'; McFarlane 58'	Report	Gerson 65'

Stade St. François Xavier, Port Louis
Referee: Brighton Chimene (Zimbabwe)
21 July 2017
15:30

Zambia	7-1	Madagascar
Banda 9', 31', 37'; Njobvu 19', 42', 74'; Hakwiya 31'	Report	Mamisoa 79' (pen.)

Stade St. François Xavier, Port Louis
Referee: Brandy Stevie Baillache (Mauritius)

23 July 2017
12:30

South Africa	2-3	Zambia
Nare 83', 88'	Report	P. Mumba 20'; Banda 25', 42'

Stade St. François Xavier, Port Louis
Referee: Patrice Milazar (Mauritius)
23 July 2017
15:30

Mozambique	2-0	Madagascar
Luis 6'; Jamisse 83'	Report

Stade St. François Xavier, Port Louis
Referee: Brandy Stevie Baillache (Mauritius)

25 July 2017
15:00

Mozambique	1-0	Zambia
Geny 43'	Report

MFA Technical Center, Quatre Bornes
Referee: Brighton Chimene (Zimbabwe)
25 July 2017
15:00

Madagascar	3-5	South Africa
Dillan 41'; Stéphan 41'; Mamitina 42'	Report	Ramatlo 14'; Tshobeni 40', 72'; Da Silva 81'; Shahabodien 88'

Stade St. François Xavier, Port Louis
Referee: Patrice Milazar (Mauritius)

== Knockout stage ==
=== Semi-finals ===
28 July 2017
12:00

Zambia	2-0	Malawi
Njobvu 3', 7'	Report

Stade St. François Xavier, Port Louis
Referee: Brighton Chimene (Zimbabwe)
28 July 2017
15:00

Mauritius	2-0	South Africa
Mitraille 45+6', 65'	Report

Stade St. François Xavier, Port Louis
Referee: Celso Alvacao (Mozambique)

=== Third place playoff ===
30 July 2017
12:00

Malawi	2-1	South Africa
Tsamba 27', 50'	Report	Nare 67'

Stade St. François Xavier, Port Louis
Referee: Brandy Stevie Baillache (Mauritius)

=== Final ===
30 July 2017
15:00

Zambia	3-0	Mauritius
Mumba 72'; Phiri 79'; Hakwiya 81'	Report

Stade St. François Xavier, Port Louis
Referee: Andofetra Rakotojaona (Madagascar)

== Goalscorers ==
5 Goals

- Banda
- Njobvu

3 Goals

- Maonga
- Nare
- Shahabodien

2 Goals

- Bogosi
- Hakwiya
- Mitraille
- Mwaungulu
- Tsamba
- Tshobeni

1 Goal

- Aristide
- Balakasi
- Benza
- Chiu Chung Fat
- Da Silva
- Dillan
- Geny
- Gerson
- Jamisse
- Luis
- Mamisoa
- Mamitina
- Mbeta
- McFarlane
- Mumba
- P. Mumba
- Philibert
- Phiri
- Ramatlo
- Stéphan
- Tauyatswala
- Titani
- Willard
