= Siyabonga Mabena =

South African soccer player (born 2007)

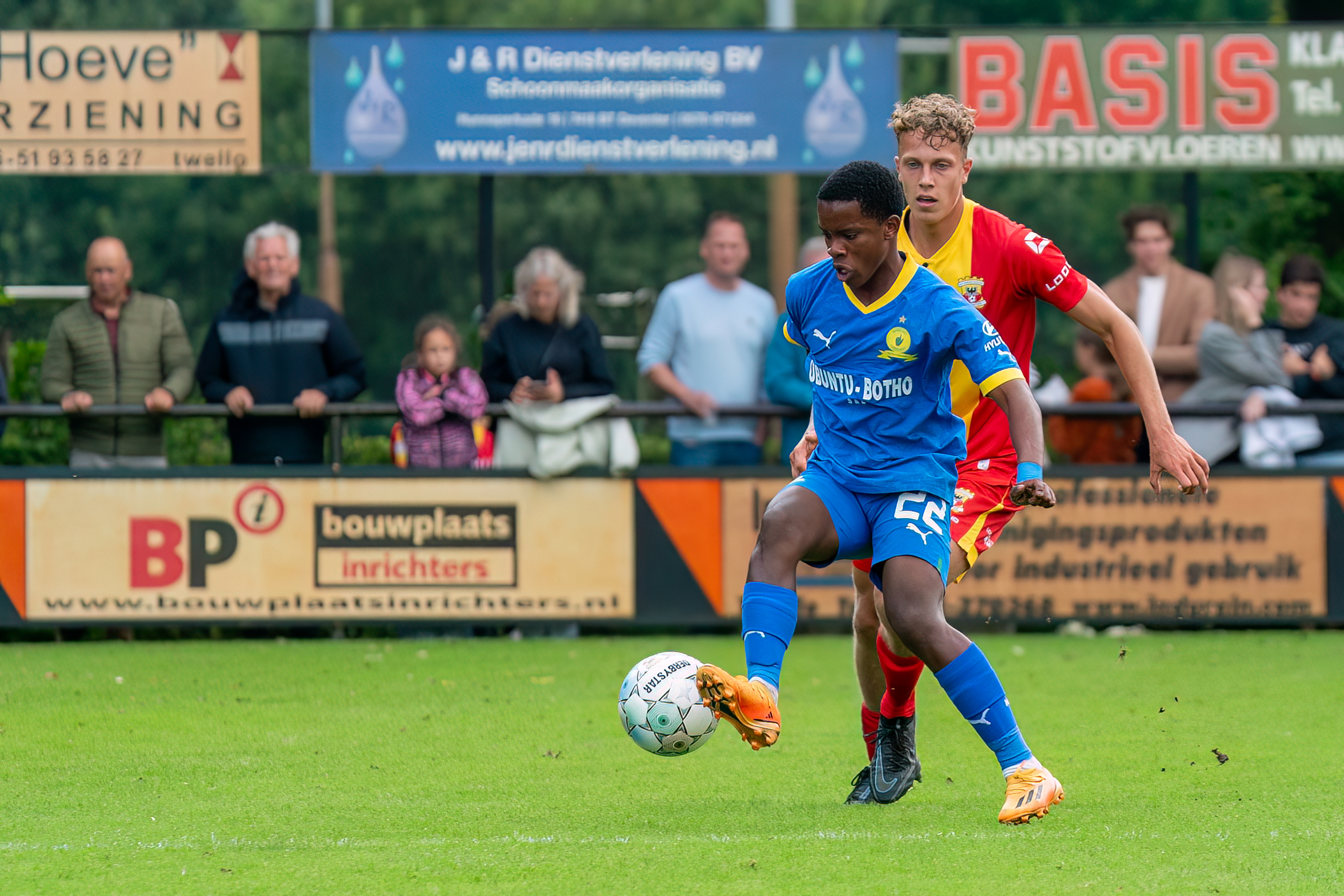

Personal information
- Full name: Siyabonga Nicolas Mabena
- Date of birth: 18 February 2007 (age 19)
- Position: Forward

Team information
- Current team: Mamelodi Sundowns
- Number: 22

Youth career
- Transnet School of Excellence
- 2022–2023: Mamelodi Sundowns

Senior career*
Years	Team	Apps	(Gls)
2023–	Mamelodi Sundowns	20	(1)

International career^{‡}
2022–	South Africa U17	9	(10)
2024–	South Africa U20	7	
- * Club domestic league appearances and goals as of 3 January 2026 ‡ National team caps and goals as of 20 June 2023

Siyabonga Nicolas Mabena (born 18 February 2007) is a South African professional soccer player who plays as a forward for Mamelodi Sundowns.

== Club career ==
Mabena progressed through the Transnet School of Excellence, before being subject to strong interest from fellow South African sides Mamelodi Sundowns and Orlando Pirates in 2022. He chose to join the Sundowns, with teammate Relebohile Ratomo joining the Pirates, and was promoted to the Sundowns' under-19 team at the age of fifteen.

On 14 March 2023, he was a shock inclusion in Rhulani Mokwena's squad for the DStv Premiership match against Royal AM. With the score at 5–1, Mabena was brought on as a substitute for Themba Zwane, becoming the fifth youngest debutant ever in the South African top flight in the process. Following the game, manager Mokwena compared Mabena to the late Gift Leremi, lauding his balance, ability to play with both feet, and his change of direction at speed. On the 27 of September 2023 Siyabonga Mabena became the youngest player to score in the Premier Soccer League at the age of 16 years 7 months and 9 days playing for Mamelodi Sundowns against Sekhukhune United.

== International career ==
=== Youth ===
Mabena was called up to the South African under-17 squad for the 2022 COSAFA Under-17 Championship. He scored five goals in South Africa's 11–0 win over the Seychelles, and followed this up with a hat trick in the 5–1 semi-final win over Malawi. Although South Africa were beaten 1–0 in the final by Zambia, Mabena was named both top scorer and player of the tournament, having scored nine goals in five appearances.

== Style of play ==
Following his debut game, manager Mokwena compared Mabena to the late Gift Leremi, lauding his balance, ability to play with both feet, and his change of direction at speed.

== Career statistics ==
=== Club ===
As of 20 June 2023

Appearances and goals by club, season and competition
Club	Season	League			League Cup		Other		Total	
Club	Season	Division	Apps	Goals	Apps	Goals	Apps	Goals	Apps	Goals
Mamelodi Sundowns	2022–23	South African Premier Division	4	0	1 (Note: Appearances in the Nedbank Cup)	0	0	0	5	0
Career total			4	0	1	0	0	0	5	0
