= 2019 COSAFA Under-17 Championship =

Tournament details
- Host country: Malawi
- Dates: 11-21 October 2019
- Teams: 8
- Venue: 2 (in 1 host city)

Final positions
- Champions: Zambia (2nd title)
- Runners-up: Mozambique
- Third place: Angola
- Fourth place: Eswatini

Tournament statistics
- Matches played: 16
- Goals scored: 50 (3.13 per match)

The 2019 COSAFA Under-17 Championship is the 8th edition of the COSAFA U-17 Championship, an association football tournament organised by the Council of Southern Africa Football Associations (COSAFA) involving teams from Southern Africa for players aged 17 and below.

== Participating teams ==
- Angola
- Comoros
- Lesotho
- Malawi
- Mozambique
- South Africa
- Eswatini
- Zambia

== Officials ==
Referees

- Darrio Landry (Seychelles)
- Patience Fidele Rulisa (Rwanda)
- Godfrey Nkhakananga (Malawi)
- Kennedy Chimense (Zambia)
- Thabo Nkhahle (Lesotho)
- Wilson Julio Muianga (Mozambique)
- Masixole Bambiso (South Africa)

Assistant Referees

- Joseph Nyauti (Malawi)
- Rosario Calembela (Angola)
- Aswet Teeluck (Mauritius)
- Lucky Kegakologetswe (Botswana)
- Thwala Banele (Eswatini)
- Mlungisi Mathuthu (Zimbabwe)
- Matheus Nevonga (Namibia)

== Venues ==
The tournament was played in Blantyre : Mpira Stadium and Kamuzu Stadium

== Group stage ==
All times are local, MUT (UTC+2).

=== Group A ===
Pos	Team	Pld	W	D	L	GF	GA	GD	Pts	Qualification
1	Zambia	3	3	0	0	16	2	+14	9	Semi-finals
2	Eswatini	3	1	1	1	3	8	−5	4	Semi-finals
3	Malawi (H)	3	1	0	2	6	5	+1	3	
4	South Africa	3	0	1	2	1	11	−10	1	

Source: COSAFA
Rules for classification: Group tiebreakers
(H) Hosts
12 October 2019
11:00

Zambia	6–0	Eswatini
	Report

Mpira Stadium, Blantyre
Referee: Wilson Julio Muianga (Mozambique)
12 October 2019
14:00

Malawi	3–0	South Africa
	Report

Mpira Stadium, Blantyre
Referee: Patience Fidele Rulisa (Rwanda)

14 October 2019
11:00

Zambia	7–0	South Africa
	Report

Mpira Stadium, Blantyre
Referee: Wilson Julio Muianga (Mozambique)
14 October 2019
14:00

Malawi	1–2	Eswatini
	Report

Mpira Stadium, Blantyre
Referee: Kennedy Chimense (Zambia)

16 October 2019
14:00

Malawi	2–3	Zambia
	Report

Mpira Stadium, Blantyre
Referee: Patience Fidele Rulisa (Rwanda)
16 October 2019
14:00

South Africa	1–1	Eswatini
	Report

Kamuzu Stadium, Blantyre
Referee: Thabo Nkhahle (Lesotho)

=== Group B ===
Pos	Team	Pld	W	D	L	GF	GA	GD	Pts	Qualification
1	Mozambique	3	2	1	0	5	1	+4	7	Semi-finals
2	Angola	3	2	0	1	6	2	+4	6	Semi-finals
3	Comoros	3	1	1	1	1	3	−2	4	
4	Lesotho	3	0	0	3	2	8	−6	0	

Source: COSAFA
Rules for classification: Group tiebreakers
11 October 2019
11:00

Comoros	1–0	Lesotho
	Report

Mpira Stadium, Blantyre
Referee: Godfrey Nkhakananga (Malawi)
11 October 2019
14:00

Angola	0–1	Mozambique
	Report

Mpira Stadium, Blantyre
Referee: Masixole Bambiso (South Africa)

13 October 2019
11:00

Angola	3–1	Lesotho
	Report

Mpira Stadium, Blantyre
Referee: Darrio Landry (Seychelles)
13 October 2019
14:00

Mozambique	0–0	Comoros
	Report

Mpira Stadium, Blantyre
Referee: Thabo Nkhahle (Lesotho)

15 October 2019
14:00

Lesotho	1–4	Mozambique
	Report

Kamuzu Stadium, Blantyre
15 October 2019
14:00

Angola	3–0	Comoros
	Report

Mpira Stadium, Blantyre
Referee: Kennedy Chimense (Zambia)

=== Knockout stage ===
Semi-finals
18 October – Mpira Stadium
Mozambique	1
Eswatini	0
18 October – Mpira Stadium
Zambia	2
Angola	0

Final
20 October – Mpira Stadium
Zambia	2
Mozambique	0
Third place
20 October – Mpira Stadium
Angola	5
Eswatini	0

==== Semi-finals ====
18 October 2018
11:00

Mozambique	1–0	Eswatini

Mpira Stadium, Blantyre
Referee: Patience Fidele Rulisa (Rwanda)
18 October 2018
14:00

Zambia	2–0	Angola

Mpira Stadium, Blantyre
Referee: Masixole Bambiso (South Africa)

==== Third place match ====
20 October 2019
11:00

Angola	5–0	Eswatini

Mpira Stadium, Blantyre
Referee: Wilson Julio Muianga (Mozambique)

==== Final ====
20 October 2019
14:30

Zambia	2–0	Mozambique

Mpira Stadium, Blantyre
Referee: Godfrey Nkhakananga (Malawi)

== Champion ==
2019 COSAFA Under-17 champion

Zambia
Second title
