= 2016 COSAFA Under-17 Championship =

Tournament details
- Host country: Mauritius
- Dates: 22–31 July 2016
- Teams: 8 (from 2 sub-confederations)
- Venue: 3 (in 3 host cities)

Final positions
- Champions: Namibia (1st title)
- Runners-up: South Africa
- Third place: Malawi
- Fourth place: Kenya

Tournament statistics
- Top scorer(s): Peter Banda (5 goals)
- All statistics correct as of 31 July 2016.

The 2016 COSAFA Under-17 Championship is the 5th edition of the COSAFA U-17 Championship, an association football tournament organised by the Council of Southern Africa Football Associations (COSAFA) involving teams from Southern Africa for players aged 17 and below. It took place in Mauritius from 22 to 31 July 2016.

All times shown in this article are in Mauritius Time (UTC+4).

== Participating teams ==
- Kenya (Note: Kenya was invited to participate in the competition after Mozambique withdrew from the competition.)
- Madagascar
- Mauritius
- Malawi
- Namibia
- South Africa
- Seychelles
- Zambia

== Venues ==
Belle Vue Maurel	Curepipe	Port Louis
Stade Anjalay	Stade George V	Stade St Francois Xavier

== Group stage ==
=== Group A ===
Pos	Team	Pld	W	D	L	GF	GA	GD	Pts	Qualification
1	South Africa	3	3	0	0	7	0	+7	9	Advance to semi-finals
2	Namibia	3	2	0	1	7	6	+1	6	Advance to semi-finals
3	Mauritius	3	1	0	2	2	5	−3	3	
4	Seychelles	3	0	0	3	1	6	−5	0	

Updated to match(es) played on 27 July 2016. Source: COSAFA
23 July 2016
13:00

Mauritius	1–3	Namibia
Hurdoyal 67'	Report	Morgan 5'; Laksman 80'; Tjahikika 85'

Stade Anjalay, Belle Vue Maurel
Referee: Andofetra Rakotojaona (Madagascar)
23 July 2016
16:00

Seychelles	0–1	South Africa
	Report	Ntuli 36'

Stade Anjalay, Belle Vue Maurel
Referee: Tshepo Gobagoba (Botswana)

25 July 2016
13:00

Namibia	0–4	South Africa
	Report	Le Roux 9' (pen.); J. Monyane 28'; Ntuli 52'; Mchilizeli 90'

Stade Anjalay, Belle Vue Maurel
Referee: Keren Treddy Yocette (Seychelles)
25 July 2016
16:00

Mauritius	1–0	Seychelles
Monple 77'	Report

Stade Anjalay, Belle Vue Maurel
Referee: Christopher Harrison (South Africa)

27 July 2016
15:00

South Africa	2–0	Mauritius
Mavuso 44'; Pillay 74'	Report

Stade George V, Curepipe
Referee: Tshepo Gobagoba (Botswana)
27 July 2016
15:00

Seychelles	1–4	Namibia
Mathiot 57'	Report	Tjahikika 30', 47', 76'; Morgan 90'

Stade St Francois Xavier, Port Louis
Referee: Andofetra Rakotojaona (Madagascar)

=== Group B ===
Pos	Team	Pld	W	D	L	GF	GA	GD	Pts	Qualification
1	Zambia	3	3	0	0	10	0	+10	9	Disqualified (Note: Zambia was disqualified from the competition for fielding two over-age players during the tournament.)
2	Malawi	3	2	0	1	7	4	+3	6	Advance to semi-finals
3	Kenya	3	1	0	2	2	10	−8	3	Advance to semi-finals
4	Madagascar	3	0	0	3	2	7	−5	0	

Updated to match(es) played on 26 July 2016. Source: COSAFA
Notes:
22 July 2016
12:00

Zambia	4–0	Kenya
Mulilo 4', 13'; Kola 37'; Nkandu 43'	Report

Stade St Francois Xavier, Port Louis
Referee: Christopher Harrison (South Africa)
22 July 2016
15:00

Malawi	2–1	Madagascar
R. Banda 50'; Chizuze 89'	Report	Mosa 32'

Stade St Francois Xavier, Port Louis
Referee: Keren Treddy Yocette (Seychelles)

24 July 2016
12:00

Kenya	2–1	Madagascar
Mukuria 25', 41' (pen.)	Report	Mosa 20' (pen.)

Stade St Francois Xavier, Port Louis
Referee: Patrice Milazar (Mauritius)
24 July 2016
15:00

Zambia	3–0	Malawi
Kola 6'; Phiri 14'; Mulilo 74'	Report

Stade St Francois Xavier, Port Louis
Referee: Stevie Baillache (Mauritius)

26 July 2016
15:00

Madagascar	0–3	Zambia
	Report	Mwiza 19'; Nyimbili 39', 88'

Stade George V, Curepipe
Referee: Patrice Milazar (Mauritius)
26 July 2016
15:00

Malawi	5–0	Kenya
Chizuze 19'; P. Banda 52', 59', 89'; Madinga 64'	Report

Stade St Francois Xavier, Port Louis
Referee: Andofetra Rakotojaona (Madagascar)

== Knockout stage ==
=== Bracket ===
Semi-finals
29 July
South Africa	4
Kenya	0
29 July
Malawi	1 (5)
Namibia	1 (6)

Final
29 July
South Africa	1 (1)
Namibia	1 (3)
Third place
29 July
Kenya	0
Malawi	2

=== Semi-finals ===
29 July 2016
13:00

South Africa	4–0	Kenya
Mkhize 10'; Le Roux 29'; Mchilizeli 36'; Dladla 73'	Report

Stade George V, Curepipe
Referee: Patrice Milazar (Mauritius)
29 July 2016
16:00

Malawi	1–1	Namibia
P. Banda 51'	Report	Morgan 88'
Penalties
	5–6

Stade George V, Curepipe
Referee: Christopher Harrison (South Africa)

=== Third place playoff ===
31 July 2016
13:00

Kenya	0–2	Malawi
	report	P. Banda 58'; Madinga 87'

Stade George V, Curepipe
Referee: Keren Treddy Yocette (Seychelles)

=== Final ===
31 July 2016
16:00

South Africa	1–1	Namibia
T. Monyane 70'	report	Awaseb 64'
Penalties
	1–3

Stade George V, Curepipe
Referee: Andofetra Rakotojaona (Madagascar)

2016 COSAFA U-17 champions

Namibia
1st title
