= Mauritius national under-17 football team =

Mauritius Under 17
- Association: Mauritius Football Association
- Confederation: CAF (Africa)
- Head coach: (Mauritius) Alain Jules
- Captain: Rony Aubeeluck
- Home stadium: Stade Germain Comarmond
- FIFA code: MRI
First colours	Second colours

Africa U-17 Cup of Nations
- Appearances: 0

FIFA U-17 World Cup
- Appearances: 0

The Mauritius national under-17 football team is the national under-17 football team of Mauritius, controlled by the Mauritius Football Association. The national under-17 football team is composed of the 20 best national football players, aged 17 years or less, selected from the 4 CTR's (Centre Technique Regional) spread throughout Mauritius. The main tournaments the team competes in are the COSAFA U-17 Challenge Cup, the Africa U-17 Cup of Nations, and the CJSOI games. The team has never qualified for the FIFA U-17 World Cup or the Africa U-17 Cup of Nations, but has won the CJSOI football gold medal twice, in 2008 and 2010. The players in the team are being prepared to join the Mauritius national under-20 football team and the 1st Division Junior National Tournament in the coming years, as well as the Mauritius national football team soon after that.

== Successful Players ==
The Under-17 Football Team produced a crop of successful players in the past who also played for the Mauritius national under-20 football team and the Mauritius national football team. Some of these players are Louis Fabrice Pithia, Andy Sophie, Henri Speville, Kersley Appou, Christopher Perle and Ricardo Naboth.

== Awards and competition records ==
=== Mauritius U-17 football achievements ===
CJSOI Games :

- 2 Time Champion (2008) (2010)

=== FIFA U-17 World Cup ===
- 1985 - Did not enter
- 1987 - Withdrew
- 1989 - Did not qualify
- 1991 - Did not enter
- 1993 - Did not qualify
- 1995 - Did not qualify
- 1997 - Did not enter
- 1999 - Did not enter
- 2001 - Did not qualify
- 2003 - Did not qualify
- 2005 - Withdrew
- 2007 - Did not qualify
- 2009 - Did not enter
- 2011 - Withdrew
- 2013 - Did not enter
- 2015 - Did not enter
- 2017 - Did not qualify
- 2019 - Did not qualify
- 2023 - Withdrew

=== CAF U-16 and U-17 World Cup Qualifiers ===
- 1985 - Did not enter
- 1987 - Withdrew
- 1989 - Did not qualify
- 1991 - Did not enter
- 1993 - Did not qualify

=== African Under-17 Championship ===
- 1995 - Did not qualify
- 1997 - Did not enter
- 1999 - Did not enter
- 2001 - Did not qualify
- 2003 - Did not qualify
- 2005 - Withdrew
- 2007 - Did not qualify
- 2009 - Did not enter
- 2011 - Withdrew
- 2013 - Did not enter
- 2015 - Did not enter
- 2017 - Did not qualify
- 2019 - Did not qualify
- 2023 - Withdrew

=== COSAFA U-17 Challenge Cup ===
- 1994 to 2002 - Did not enter / Did not qualify
- 2009 - Cancelled
- 2016 - Group Stage
- 2017 - Runners-Up

== Players ==
=== Current squad ===
The following players were named to the Mauritius U-17 squad for the CJSOI games.

No.	Pos.	Player	Date of birth (age)	Caps	Goals	Club
	GK	Christopher Caserne				(Mauritius Football Association) Centre Technique Regional
	GK	Ashley Oomajee				(Mauritius Football Association) Centre Technique Regional
	DF	Clarel Antoine				(Mauritius Football Association) Centre Technique Regional
	DF	Rony Aubeeluck (c)				(Mauritius Football Association) Centre Technique Regional
	DF	Steven Félix				(Mauritius Football Association) Centre Technique Regional
	DF	Bradley Moedine				(Mauritius Football Association) Centre Technique Regional
	DF	Jean-Patrice Roselane				(Mauritius Football Association) Centre Technique Regional
	DF	Brandon Sitorah				(Mauritius Football Association) Centre Technique Regional
	MF	Herzy Calambé				(Mauritius Football Association) Centre Technique Regional
	MF	John Far				(Mauritius Football Association) Centre Technique Regional
	MF	Chris Jolicoeur				(Mauritius Football Association) Centre Technique Regional
	MF	Brian Judoobar				(Mauritius Football Association) Centre Technique Regional
	MF	Fabien Louise				(Mauritius Football Association) Centre Technique Regional
	MF	Ashley Papillon				(Mauritius Football Association) Centre Technique Regional
	MF	Warren Soopaul				(Mauritius Football Association) Centre Technique Regional
	FW	Dwayne Heerah				(Mauritius Football Association) Centre Technique Regional
	FW	Juliano Pudoo				(Mauritius Football Association) Centre Technique Regional
	FW	Yannick Mootoo				(Mauritius Football Association) Centre Technique Regional

== See also ==
- Mauritius national under-20 football team
- Mauritius national football team
