= 1995 African U-17 Championship =

Tournament details
- Host country: Mali
- City: Bamako
- Dates: 14–27 May
- Teams: 8 (from 1 confederation)

Final positions
- Champions: Ghana (1st title)
- Runners-up: Nigeria
- Third place: Guinea
- Fourth place: Mali

Tournament statistics
- Matches played: 16
- Goals scored: 50 (3.13 per match)

The 1995 African U-17 Championship was the first U-17 football competition organized by the Confederation of African Football (CAF). Held in Mali, the tournament also served as CAF's qualifier for the 1995 FIFA U-17 World Championship, with the top three teams qualifying for the World Championship.

== Qualification ==
=== Qualified teams ===
- Botswana
- Ghana
- Guinea
- Mali (host nation)
- Mozambique
- Nigeria
- Sudan
- Tunisia

== Group stage ==
=== Group A ===
Pos	Team	Pld	W	D	L	GF	GA	GD	Pts	Qualification
1	Ghana	3	3	0	0	10	0	+10	9	Knockout stage
2	Mali (H)	3	1	0	2	3	3	0	3	Knockout stage
3	Mozambique	3	1	0	2	3	5	−2	3	
4	Tunisia	3	1	0	2	2	10	−8	3	

Rules for classification: Group stage tiebreakers
(H) Hosts
14 May

Ghana	1–0	Mali

14 May

Tunisia	2–1	Mozambique

17 May

Ghana	2–0	Mozambique

17 May

Mali	2–0	Tunisia

20 May

Ghana	7–0	Tunisia

20 May

Mali	1–2	Mozambique

=== Group B ===
Pos	Team	Pld	W	D	L	GF	GA	GD	Pts	Qualification
1	Nigeria	3	3	0	0	9	1	+8	9	Knockout stage
2	Guinea	3	1	1	1	5	3	+2	4	Knockout stage
3	Sudan	3	1	1	1	3	5	−2	4	
4	Botswana	3	0	0	3	1	9	−8	0	

Rules for classification: Group stage tiebreakers
15 May

Nigeria	4–0	Botswana

15 May

Guinea	1–1	Sudan

18 May

Nigeria	3–0	Sudan

18 May

Guinea	3–0	Botswana

21 May

Nigeria	2–1	Guinea

21 May

Sudan	2–1	Botswana

== Knock-out stage ==
Semi-finals
Ghana	3
Guinea	0
Mali	1
Nigeria	3

Final
Ghana (a.e.t.)	3
Nigeria	1
Third place
Guinea (a.e.t.)	2
Mali	1

=== Semi-finals ===
25 May

Ghana	3–0	Guinea

25 May

Mali	1–3	Nigeria

For winning their semi-finals, Ghana and Nigeria qualified for the 1995 FIFA U-17 World Championship with Guinea and Mali meeting in the third place match for the third and final place in the 1995 FIFA U-17 World Championship.

=== Third place match ===
26 May

Guinea	2–1 (a.e.t.)	Mali

For winning the third place match, Guinea qualified for 1995 FIFA U-17 World Championship with Mali missing out.

=== Final ===
27 May

Ghana	3–1 (a.e.t.)	Nigeria

== Winners ==
1995 CAF Under-17 Championship
(Ghana)
Ghana
First title
