= Joseph Sabobo Banda =

Zambian footballer (born 2005)

Personal information
- Date of birth: 17 December 2005 (age 20)
- Place of birth: Lusaka, Zambia
- Height: 1.67 m (5 ft 6 in)
- Position: Forward

Team information
- Current team: Alashkert
- Number: 17

Senior career*
Years	Team	Apps	(Gls)
2021–2024	Atletico Lusaka		
2022–2023	→ Red Arrows (loan)		
2023	→ Nkwazi (loan)		
2024–2025	Zürich II	20	(3)
2024–2025	Zürich	9	(1)
2025–2026	Hapoel Be'er Sheva	1	(0)
2026–	Alashkert	9	(1)

International career^{‡}
2021	Zambia U17	1	(2)
2022–2025	Zambia U20	8	(1)
2024–	Zambia	10	(1)
- * Club domestic league appearances and goals as of 18 June 2026 ‡ National team caps and goals as of 00:43, 14 December 2025 (UTC)

Joseph Sabobo Banda (born 17 December 2005) is a Zambian professional footballer who plays as a forward for Armenian Premier League club Alashkert and Zambia national team.

== Club career ==
Sabobo Banda grew up in Chaisa, Lusaka, and represented Atletico Lusaka in the Lusaka Provincial League, finishing as top scorer in 2021. These performances caught the eye of Zambia Super League team Red Arrows, who signed him on an 18-month loan deal in January 2022.

In February 2022, he went on trial with Spanish giants Barcelona.

On 16 January 2024, Sabobo signed a contract with Zürich in Switzerland until 2028.

On 2 February 2026, Armenian Premier League club Alashkert announced the signing of Sabobo from Hapoel Be'er Sheva.

== International career ==
A prolific goal-scorer for the Zambian under-17 side, Sabobo Banda has been called up to the Zambia national football team on multiple occasions, the first call-up coming when he was 14 years old.

On 10 December 2025, Banda was called up to the Zambia squad for the 2025 Africa Cup of Nations.
