= Mozambique national under-17 football team =

National youth association football team

Mozambique U-17
- Nickname: Os Mambas (The Mambas)
- Association: Federação Moçambicana de Futebol (FMF)
- Confederation: CAF (Africa)
- Sub-confederation: COSAFA (Southern Africa)
- Head coach: Luís Guerreiro
- Home stadium: Estádio do Zimpeto
First colours	Second colours

U-17 Africa Cup of Nations
- Appearances: 2 (first in 1995)
- Best result: Group stage (1995, 2001)

COSAFA U-17 Youth Championship
- Appearances: 7 (first in 1994)
- Best result: (silver) Runners-Up (1994, 2019)

FIFA U-17 World Cup
- Appearances: 1 (first in 2026)

The Mozambique national under-17 football team, nicknamed the Mambas, represents the Mozambique in international youth football competitions. Its primary role is the development of players in preparation for the senior national team. The team competes in a variety of competitions, including the biennial FIFA U-17 World Cup and the U-17 Africa Cup of Nations, which is the top competitions for this age group.

== History ==
=== FIFA U-17 World Cup ===
They will make their debut at the FIFA U-17 World Cup in 2026.

=== U–17 AFCON ===
They previously played at the 1994 and 2001 African U-17 Championship and exited both editions in the group stages.

=== COSAFA U–17 Championship ===
They qualified for the 2026 U-17 Africa Cup of Nations after finishing third at the 2025 COSAFA Under-17 Championship.

== Players ==
The following 23-player squad was named for the 2026 FIFA U-17 World Cup.

No.	Pos.	Player	Date of birth (age)	Club
1	GK	João Jofrisse	1 January 2009 (aged 17)	(Mozambican Football Federation) Costa do Sol
12	GK	Justino Paulo	1 January 2009 (aged 17)	(Mozambican Football Federation) Black Bulls
22	GK	Ricardo José	1 January 2009 (aged 17)	(Mozambican Football Federation) Black Bulls
2	DF	Pires António	1 January 2009 (aged 17)	(Mozambican Football Federation) Black Bulls
3	DF	Denzel Bane	1 January 2009 (aged 17)	(Royal Spanish Football Federation) Levante
4	DF	Florisnaldo Matias	1 January 2009 (aged 17)	(Mozambican Football Federation) Ferroviário de Nampula
5	DF	Allan Figueiredo	1 January 2009 (aged 17)	(Mozambican Football Federation) Black Bulls
13	DF	Pascoal Júlio	1 January 2009 (aged 17)	(Mozambican Football Federation) Black Bulls
14	DF	Edmilson Patrício	1 January 2009 (aged 17)	(Mozambican Football Federation) Black Bulls
8	MF	Diego Pelembe (captain)	9 June 2009 (aged 17)	(Mozambican Football Federation) Black Bulls
10	MF	Khensane	30 January 2009 (aged 17)	(Brazilian Football Confederation) Coritiba
15	MF	Eros Monteiro	1 January 2009 (aged 17)	(Royal Spanish Football Federation) Rayo Vallecano
16	MF	Charif Carlos	1 January 2009 (aged 17)	(Mozambican Football Federation) Liga Desportiva de Maputo
17	MF	Joel Catamo	1 January 2009 (aged 17)	(Mozambican Football Federation) Black Bulls
18	MF	Steys José	1 January 2009 (aged 17)	(Mozambican Football Federation) Ferroviário de Nampula
19	MF	Valentim José	1 January 2009 (aged 17)	(Mozambican Football Federation) Costa do Sol
20	MF	Joaquim Mubai	1 January 2009 (aged 17)	(Mozambican Football Federation) Costa do Sol
21	MF	Chausson Nhabanga	1 January 2009 (aged 17)	(Mozambican Football Federation) Black Bulls
23	MF	Jonas Marcos	1 January 2009 (aged 17)	(Mozambican Football Federation) Black Bulls
7	FW	Alírio Cuna	1 January 2009 (aged 17)	(Mozambican Football Federation) Black Bulls
9	FW	António Nhampule	1 January 2009 (aged 17)	(German Football Association) Eintracht Frankfurt

== Results and fixtures ==
The following is a list of match results in the last 12 months, as well as any future matches that have been scheduled.

Legend

Win Draw Loss Fixture

=== 2026 ===
14 May 2026 2026 U-17 Africa Cup of Nations	Tanzania	3–0	Mozambique	Stade de Marrakech, Marrakesh
18:00

17 May 2026 2026 U-17 Africa Cup of Nations	Mozambique	1–1	Mali	Stade de Marrakech, Marrakesh
20:00

20 May 2026 2026 U-17 Africa Cup of Nations	Angola	1–2	Mozambique	Stade de Marrakech, Marrakesh
17:00

23 May 2026 2026 U-17 Africa Cup of Nations (World Cup play-off)	Ethiopia	1–1 (4–5 p)	Mozambique	Stade de Marrakech, Marrakesh
17:00
	Penalties
	4		5

19 November 2026 2026 FIFA U-17 World Cup – Group C	Mozambique	v	Denmark	Aspire Zone – Pitch 3, Al Rayyan
23:00		Report

22 November 2026 2026 FIFA U-17 World Cup – Group C	Argentina	v	Mozambique	Aspire Zone – Pitch 4, Al Rayyan
16:30

25 November 2026 2026 FIFA U-17 World Cup – Group C	Australia	v	Mozambique	Aspire Zone – Pitch 8, Al Rayyan
16:30

== Competitive record ==
=== FIFA U-16 and U-17 World Cup record ===
FIFA U-16 and U-17 World Cup
Year	Round	GP	W	D^{1}	L	GS	GA
(China) 1985	Did not qualify						
(Canada) 1987	Did not qualify						
(Scotland) 1989	Did not qualify						
(Italy) 1991	Did not qualify						
(Japan) 1993	Did not qualify						
(Ecuador) 1995	Did not qualify						
(Egypt) 1997	Did not qualify						
(New Zealand) 1999	Did not qualify						
(Trinidad and Tobago) 2001	Did not qualify						
(Finland) 2003	Did not qualify						
(Peru) 2005	Did not qualify						
(South Korea) 2007	Did not qualify						
(Nigeria) 2009	Did not qualify						
(Mexico) 2011	Did not qualify						
(United Arab Emirates) 2013	Did not qualify						
(Chile) 2015	Did not qualify						
(India) 2017	Did not qualify						
(Brazil) 2019	Did not qualify						
(Indonesia) 2023	Did not qualify						
(Qatar) 2025	Did not qualify						
(Qatar) 2026	In progress	2	1	0	1	5	2
Total:1/21	TBD	2	1	0	1	5	2

=== U-17 Africa Cup of Nations record ===
U-17 Africa Cup of Nations
Hosts/Year	Round	GP	W	D	L	GS	GA
(Mali) 1995	Group Stage	3	1	0	2	3	5
(Botswana) 1997	Did not enter						
(Guinea) 1999	Withdrew						
(Seychelles) 2001	Group Stage	3	0	0	3	1	9
(Eswatini) 2003	Did not qualify						
(The Gambia) 2005	Did not qualify						
(Togo) 2007	Did not qualify						
(Algeria) 2009	Did not qualify						
(Rwanda) 2011	Did not qualify						
(Morocco) 2013	Did not qualify						
(Niger) 2015	Did not qualify						
(Gabon) 2017	Did not qualify						
(Tanzania) 2019	Did not qualify						
(Algeria) 2023	Did not qualify						
(Morocco) 2025	Did not qualify						
(Morocco) 2026	Group Stage	4	1	2	1	4	6
(Morocco) 2027	TBD						
Total	Group Stage	10	2	2	6	8	20

== See also ==
- Mozambique national football team
- Mozambique national under-20 football team
