= Seychelles national under-17 football team =

Seychelles U-17
- Nickname(s): The Pirates
- Association: Seychelles Football Federation
- Confederation: CAF (Africa)
- Sub-confederation: COSAFA (Southern Africa)
- Head coach: Gavin Jeanne
- Home stadium: Stade Linité
| First colours | Second colours |

U-17 Africa Cup of Nations
- Appearances: 1 (first in 2001)
- Best result: Group stage (2001)

FIFA U-17 World Cup
- Appearances: None

The Seychelles national U-17 football team is the representative of Seychelles within all international tournaments that pertain to that age level. It is controlled and administered by the Seychelles Football Federation.

== History ==
The Seychelles national U-17 football team won the 1995 Commission de la Jeunesse et des Sports de l’Océan Indien (CJSOI) competition in Madagascar. They made their first Africa U-17 Cup of Nations appearance at the 2001 African U-17 Championship after they qualified as host. They also made their debut COSAFA U-17 competition in 2016 in Mauritius following their 1–0 loss to South Africa.

== Honours ==
- Commission de la Jeunesse et des Sports de l’Océan Indien

- Winner (1): 1995

== Competitive record ==
=== FIFA U-16 and U-17 World Cup record ===
FIFA U-16 and U-17 World Cup
| Year | Round | PLD | W | D* | L | GS | GA |
|---|---|---|---|---|---|---|---|
| (China) 1985 | Did not qualify | | | | | | |
| (Canada) 1987 | Did not qualify | | | | | | |
| (Scotland) 1989 | Did not qualify | | | | | | |
| (Italy) 1991 | Did not qualify | | | | | | |
| (Japan) 1993 | Did not qualify | | | | | | |
| (Ecuador) 1995 | Did not qualify | | | | | | |
| (Egypt) 1997 | Did not qualify | | | | | | |
| (New Zealand) 1999 | Did not qualify | | | | | | |
| (Trinidad and Tobago) 2001 | Did not qualify | | | | | | |
| (Finland) 2003 | Did not qualify | | | | | | |
| (Peru) 2005 | Did not qualify | | | | | | |
| (South Korea) 2007 | Did not qualify | | | | | | |
| (Nigeria) 2009 | Did not qualify | | | | | | |
| (Mexico) 2011 | Did not qualify | | | | | | |
| (United Arab Emirates) 2013 | Did not qualify | | | | | | |
| (Chile) 2015 | Did not qualify | | | | | | |
| (India) 2017 | Did not qualify | | | | | | |
| (Brazil) 2019 | Did not qualify | | | | | | |
| (Indonesia) 2023 | Did not qualify | | | | | | |
| (Qatar) 2025 | Did not qualify | | | | | | |
| (Qatar) 2026 | To be determined | | | | | | |
| Total | 0/20 | 0 | 0 | 0 | 0 | 0 | 0 |

=== U-17 Africa Cup of Nations ===
U-17 Africa Cup of Nations record
| Year | Round | Position | GP | W | D* | L | GS | GA |
|---|---|---|---|---|---|---|---|---|
| (Mali) 1995 | Did not enter | | | | | | | |
| (Botswana) 1997 | Did not enter | | | | | | | |
| (Guinea) 1999 | Did not enter | | | | | | | |
| (Seychelles) 2001 | Group stage | 8th | 3 | 0 | 0 | 3 | 1 | 17 |
| (Eswatini) 2003 | Did not enter | | | | | | | |
| (The Gambia) 2005 | Did not enter | | | | | | | |
| (Togo) 2007 | Did not enter | | | | | | | |
| (Algeria) 2009 | Did not qualify | | | | | | | |
| (Rwanda) 2011 | Did not enter | | | | | | | |
| (Morocco) 2013 | Did not enter | | | | | | | |
| (Niger) 2015 | Did not qualify | | | | | | | |
| (Gabon) 2017 | Did not qualify | | | | | | | |
| (Tanzania) 2019 | Did not qualify | | | | | | | |
| (Algeria) 2023 | Did not qualify | | | | | | | |
| (Morocco) 2025 | Did not enter | | | | | | | |
| Total | Group stage | 1/15 | 3 | 0 | 0 | 3 | 1 | 17 |

== See also ==
- Seychelles national football team
- Seychelles national under-20 football team
