= 2021 U-17 Africa Cup of Nations qualification =

2021 Africa U-17 Cup of Nations qualification
Tournament details
- Host countries: Algeria (North Zone); Senegal (West A Zone); Togo (West B Zone); Rwanda (Central-East Zone); South Africa (South Zone)
- Dates: 22 November 2020 – 13 February 2021
- Teams: 33 (from 1 confederation)

Tournament statistics
- Matches played: 42
- Goals scored: 141 (3.36 per match)
- Top scorer(s): (Senegal) Ibou Sané (Uganda) Oscar Mawa (6 goals each)

The 2021 Africa U-17 Cup of Nations qualification was a men's under-17 football competition which decided the teams that would have participated in the 2021 Africa U-17 Cup of Nations.

Players born 1 January 2004 or later were eligible to participate in the competition. A total of twelve teams qualified and would have played in the final tournament, including Morocco who qualified automatically as hosts.

== Teams ==
This will be the first edition in Africa U-17 Cup of Nations to have expanded to 12 teams instead of eight. Each of the six zones received two spots in the final tournament.

Zone	Spots	Teams entering qualification	Did not enter
North Zone (UNAF)	1 spot + hosts	**Algeria** **(H)**; Libya; Tunisia	**Morocco** **(Q)**; Egypt
West A Zone (WAFU-UFOA A)	2 spots	Gambia **(D)** (Note: Gambia & Sierra Leone were disqualified from the qualifiers after some of their players failed to pass the MRI test.); Guinea-Bissau; **Mali**; Mauritania; **Senegal** **(H)**; Sierra Leone **(D)**	Cape Verde; Guinea; Liberia
West B Zone (WAFU-UFOA B)	2 spots	Benin; Burkina Faso; Ghana; **Ivory Coast**; Niger; **Nigeria**; Togo **(H, D)** (Note: Togo were disqualified from the qualifiers after two of their players failed to pass the MRI test.)	
Central Zone (UNIFFAC)	2 spots	**Cameroon**; Central African Republic; Chad; **Congo**; DR Congo; Equatorial Guinea; Gabon; São Tomé and Príncipe	
Central-East Zone (CECAFA)	2 spots	Djibouti; Ethiopia; Kenya; Rwanda **(H)**; **Tanzania**; **Uganda**; South Sudan **(D)** (Note: South Sudan were disqualified from the qualifiers after four of their players failed to pass the MRI test.)	Eritrea; Burundi; Somalia; Sudan
South Zone (COSAFA)	2 spots	Angola; Botswana **(D)** (Note: Botswana, Comoros, Eswatini and Zimbabwe initially entered in the qualifiers, but were later disqualified after at least 1 of their players failed the MRI test. The tournament was then later restarted with the remaining 4 teams and the games previously played were regarded as warm-ups.); Comoros **(D)**; Eswatini **(D)**; Malawi; **South Africa** **(H)**; **Zambia**; Zimbabwe **(D)**	Lesotho; Madagascar; Mauritius; Mozambique; Namibia; Seychelles

Notes

- Teams in **bold** qualified for the final tournament.
- (H): Qualifying tournament hosts
- (Q): Automatically qualified for final tournament regardless of qualification results
- (D): Disqualified

== Schedule ==
The qualifying competition is split into regional competitions, with the teams entering the qualifying tournament of their zone. The final arrangements of the zonal qualifiers were decided later due to the delays caused by the COVID-19 pandemic. The schedule of each qualifying zone is as follows.

Zone	Group stage	Knockout stage
South Zone	22–26 November 2020	29 November 2020
South Zone	Originally set to be played between 22 July–1 August 2020 in Malawi	
Central-East Zone	13–18 December 2020	20–22 December 2020
Central-East Zone	Originally set to be played at the beginning of July	
West B Zone	8–12 January 2021	15–18 January 2021
West B Zone	Originally set to be played between 15–30 June 2020 in Benin	
North Zone	18–24 January 2021	—
North Zone	Originally set to be played between 15–24 July 2020	
Central Zone	14–19 July 2020 (postponed, originally in Cameroon)	21–23 July 2020 (postponed, originally in Cameroon)
West A Zone	8–15 August 2020 (postponed, originally in Sierra Leone)	19–22 August 2020 (postponed, originally in Sierra Leone)

== North Zone ==
The UNAF U-17 Tournament, which also served as the qualifiers for the Africa U-17 Cup of Nations was initially planned to be hosted by Algeria between 15–24 July 2020. However, it could not be held in the scheduled time span because of the COVID-19 pandemic and was later scheduled and held between 18–24 January 2021. The matches were played at Algiers (Stade du 5 Juillet).

The draw for the fixtures was held on 30 December 2020. The three teams were placed in one group, with the winners qualifying for the final tournament. Morocco didn't participate in the qualifiers as they had already qualified as the hosts of the final tournament.

All times are local, CET (UTC+1).

Pos	Team	Pld	W	D	L	GF	GA	GD	Pts	Qualification
1	Algeria (H)	2	1	1	0	4	3	+1	4	2021 Africa U-17 Cup of Nations
2	Tunisia	2	1	1	0	3	2	+1	4	
3	Libya	2	0	0	2	3	5	−2	0	

Source: UNAF
Rules for classification: 1) Points; 2) Goal difference; 3) Goals scored
(H) Hosts
18 January 2021
14:30

Algeria	3–2	Libya
Ouchouache 39'; Omar 49'; Nottebaere 86'	Report	Abdulnabi 29'; Nottebaere 59' (o.g.)

Stade du 5 Juillet, Algiers
Attendance: 0
Referee: Ibrahim Nour El-Din (Egypt)

21 January 2021
14:30

Libya	1–2	Tunisia
Boushibah 78'	Report	Mahdouani 54'; Trabelsi 90+5'

Stade du 5 Juillet, Algiers
Attendance: 0
Referee: Mustapha Kechaf (Morocco)

24 January 2021
14:30

Tunisia	1–1	Algeria
Senana 90'	Report	Zuliani 70'

Stade du 5 Juillet, Algiers
Attendance: 0
Referee: Amin Mohamed Omar (Egypt)

== West A Zone ==
The 2021 WAFU Zone A Tournament which serves as the qualifiers for the Africa U-17 Cup of Nations was initially planned to be hosted from 11–20 December 2020 in Sierra Leone, but was postponed. The tournament was later shifted and held in Senegal between 5–13 February 2021.

=== Group stage ===
==== Group A ====
Pos	Team	Pld	W	D	L	GF	GA	GD	Pts	Qualification
1	Senegal (H)	1	1	0	0	4	0	+4	3	Semi-finals
2	Mauritania	1	0	0	1	0	4	−4	0	Semi-finals
3	Gambia (D)	0	0	0	0	0	0	0	0	Disqualified (Note: Gambia were disqualified from the qualifiers after some players failed to pass the MRI test. They were considered to have withdrawn from the competition, and all previous matches played by them shall be considered "null and void" and would not be considered in determining the final group rankings.)

Source: CAF
Rules for classification: 1) Points; 2) Goal difference; 3) Goals scored
(D) Disqualified; (H) Hosts
Notes:

5 February 2021
14:00

Senegal	Voided (4–2)	Gambia
Gning 7'; Sané 26', 35', 57'	Report	Bajo 39'; Baldeh 67' (pen.)

Stade Lat-Dior, Thiès
Referee: Moses Forkpah (Liberia)

7 February 2021
17:00

Gambia	Voided (2–0)	Mauritania
Jatta 22'; Marong 89'	Report

Stade Lat-Dior, Thiès
Referee: Swahib Bangura (Sierra Leone)

9 February 2021
14:00

Mauritania	0–4	Senegal
	Report	Sané 8'; Diop 45+1'; Niang 58'; Gning 78'

Stade Lat-Dior, Thiès
Referee: Sory Ibrahima Keita (Mali)

==== Group B ====
Pos	Team	Pld	W	D	L	GF	GA	GD	Pts	Qualification
1	Mali	1	1	0	0	5	0	+5	3	Semi-finals
2	Guinea-Bissau	1	0	0	1	0	5	−5	0	Semi-finals
3	Sierra Leone (D)	0	0	0	0	0	0	0	0	Disqualified (Note: Sierra Leone were disqualified from the qualifiers after some players failed to pass the MRI test. They were considered to have withdrawn from the competition, and all previous matches played by them shall be considered "null and void" and would not be considered in determining the final group rankings.)

Source: CAF
Rules for classification: 1) Points; 2) Goal difference; 3) Goals scored
(D) Disqualified
Notes:

5 February 2021
17:00

Sierra Leone	Voided (0–1)	Guinea-Bissau
	Report	Pessi 30' (pen.)

Stade Lat-Dior, Thiès
Referee: Moussa Diou (Mauritania)

7 February 2021
14:00

Mali	Voided (5–0)	Sierra Leone
Koïta 7'; Doumbia 16'; Diallo 50', 85'; Maïga 63'	Report

Stade Lat-Dior, Thiès
Referee: Fatou Ngum (Gambia)

9 February 2021
17:00

Guinea-Bissau	0–5	Mali
	Report	Diallo 26', 51'; Foungognon 72'; Danioko 78'; Kané 85'

Stade Lat-Dior, Thiès
Referee: Abdoulaye Manet (Guinea)

=== Knockout stage ===
In the knockout stages, if a match is level at the end of normal playing time, a penalty shoot-out without extra time was used to determine the winners.

Semi-finals
11 February– Stade Lat-Dior
Senegal	4
Guinea-Bissau	0
11 February –Stade Lat-Dior
Mali	5
Mauritania	1

Final
13 February – Stade Lat-Dior
Senegal	2
Mali	0

==== Semifinals ====
11 February 2021
14:00

Mali	5–1	Mauritania
Diallo 23'; Traoré 51'; Foungognon 54' (pen.), 55'; Kané 79'	Report	Ngom 37' (pen.)

Stade Lat-Dior, Thiès
Referee: Moses Forkpah (Liberia)
11 February 2021
17:30

Senegal	4–0	Guinea-Bissau
Traoré 29'; Niang 41'; Sané 48'; Faye 52'	Report

Stade Lat-Dior, Thiès
Referee: Abdoulaye Lambert Manet (Guinea)

==== Final ====
13 February 2021
16:00

Senegal	2–0	Mali
Gning 30'; Sané 81' (pen.)	Report

Stade Lat-Dior, Thiès
Referee: Moussa Diou (Mauritania)

== West B Zone ==
The 2021 WAFU Zone B Tournament which serves as a qualifier tournament for the Africa U-17 Cup of Nations was initially planned to be hosted by Benin from 15–30 June 2020, but was later shifted and held in Togo between 5–18 January 2021. The matches were played at Lomé (Stade de Kégué and Stade Municipal).

All times are local, GMT (UTC±0).

=== Group stage ===
The seven teams were drawn into two groups of three and four teams. The winners and the runners-up of each group advanced to the semi-finals.

==== Group A ====
Pos	Team	Pld	W	D	L	GF	GA	GD	Pts	Qualification
1	Burkina Faso	2	1	1	0	5	1	+4	4	Semi-finals
2	Niger	2	1	1	0	3	0	+3	4	Semi-finals
3	Benin	2	0	0	2	1	8	−7	0	
4	Togo (H, D)	0	0	0	0	0	0	0	0	Disqualified (Note: Togo were disqualified from the qualifiers after two of their players failed to pass the MRI test. They were considered to have withdrawn from the competition, and all previous matches played by them shall be considered "null and void" and would not be considered in determining the final group rankings.)

Rules for classification: Group tiebreakers
(D) Disqualified; (H) Hosts
Notes:
5 January 2021
16:00

Togo	Voided (2–1)	Niger
Kolani 57'; Kpérédja 90+2'	Report	Ousmane 30'

Stade de Kégué, Lomé
Referee: Quadri Adebimpe (Nigeria)
5 January 2021
19:00

Benin	1–5	Burkina Faso
Ouorou 51'	Report	Ouattara 13', 48'; Diakité 20', 63'; Yaméogo 90+1'

Stade de Kégué, Lomé
Referee: Patrick Tanguy Vlei (Ivory Coast)

8 January 2021
16:00

Benin	Voided (1–3)	Togo
Ouorou 54'	Report	Sedzro 38'; Dotsè 65'; Adohoun 90+2'

Stade de Kégué, Lomé
Referee: Charles Bulu (Ghana)
8 January 2021
19:00

Niger	0–0	Burkina Faso
	Report

Stade de Kégué, Lomé
Referee: Patrick Tanguy Vlei (Ivory Coast)

11 January 2021
16:00

Burkina Faso	Cancelled	Togo

Stade de Kégué, Lomé
11 January 2021
16:00

Niger	3–0	Benin
Ousmane 8'; Daouda 15', 34'	Report

Stade Municipal, Lomé
Referee: Charles Bulu (Ghana)

==== Group B ====
Pos	Team	Pld	W	D	L	GF	GA	GD	Pts	Qualification
1	Ivory Coast	2	2	0	0	4	1	+3	6	Semi-finals
2	Nigeria	2	0	1	1	1	2	−1	1	Semi-finals
3	Ghana	2	0	1	1	2	4	−2	1	

Rules for classification: Group tiebreakers
6 January 2021
16:00

Nigeria	0–1	Ivory Coast
	Report	Konaté 75'

Stade Municipal, Lomé
Referee: Issa Mouhamed (Benin)

9 January 2021
16:00

Ghana	1–1	Nigeria
Issahaku 87' (pen.)	Report	Arumala 82' (pen.)

Stade Municipal, Lomé
Referee: Komlavi Aklassou (Togo)

12 January 2021
16:00

Ivory Coast	3–1	Ghana
Konaté 10'; Likpa 48'; Don 68' (pen.)	Report	Batigi 51'

Stade Municipal, Lomé
Referee: Vincentia Amedome (Togo)

=== Knockout stage ===
In the knockout stages, if a match is level at the end of normal playing time, a penalty shoot-out without extra time was used to determine the winners.

Semi-finals
15 January – Stade de Kégué
Burkina Faso	0
Nigeria	1
15 January – Stade de Kégué
Ivory Coast	1
Niger	0

Final
18 January – Stade de Kégué
Nigeria	2
Ivory Coast	3
Third place
18 January – Stade de Kégué
Burkina Faso	1(10)
Niger	1 (9)

==== Semifinals ====
15 January 2021
16:00

Burkina Faso	0–1	Nigeria
	Report	Emmanuel 77'

Stade de Kégué, Lomé
Referee: Patrick Tanguy Vlei (Ivory Coast)
15 January 2021
19:00

Ivory Coast	1–0	Niger
Traoré 47'	Report

Stade de Kégué, Lomé
Referee: Charles Bulu (Ghana)

==== Third Place match ====
18 January 2021
15:30

Burkina Faso	1–1	Niger
Tinta 89'	Report	Hassane 10'
Penalties
Tietietta (penalty missed); Tinta (penalty scored); Sanou (penalty scored); Djanbou (penalty scored); Ouattara (penalty scored); Camara (penalty scored); Kabré (penalty scored); Nacro (penalty scored); Ghanou (penalty scored); Kiendrebeogo (penalty scored); Ido (penalty scored)	10–9	(penalty scored) N'Baye; (penalty scored) Ridouane; (penalty missed) Hamidou; (penalty scored) Hassane; (penalty scored) Mohamadou; (penalty scored) Wahabo; (penalty scored) Goumar; (penalty scored) Ousmane; (penalty scored) Adamou; (penalty scored) Abdoul Latif; (penalty missed) Hainikoye

Stade de Kégué, Lomé
Referee: Quadri Adebimpe (Nigeria)

==== Final ====
18 January 2021
19:00

Nigeria	2–3	Ivory Coast
Abdullahi 90', 90+1'	Report	Koné 15'; Konaté 59'; Traoré 83'

Stade de Kégué, Lomé
Referee: Charles Bulu (Ghana)

== Central Zone ==
The 2021 UNIFFAC U17 Tournament which would have served as a qualifier tournament for the Africa U-17 Cup of Nations was initially planned to be held in Cameroon on 2020, and then in Malabo, Equatorial Guinea in February 2021.

In February 2021, this tournament was finally cancelled by CAF due to the absence of a host country and the absence of an MRI machine in most of the countries of this zone. For the 2021 Africa U-17 Cup of Nations, CAF decided to qualify Cameroon and Congo, the two finalists of the last edition of the zonal qualifiers of UNIFFAC in 2018.

== Central-East Zone ==
The CECAFA qualifiers for the Africa U-17 Cup of Nations were initially planned to be hosted at the beginning of July 2020 but were then later shifted to 13–22 December 2020. Nine teams were drawn into three groups of three teams during the draw made in October. However, two teams, namely Eritrea and Sudan withdrew before the start of the tournament and the seven remaining teams were then redrawn into new groups. The matches were played at Gisenyi (Umuganda Stadium).

All times are local, CAT (UTC+2).

=== Group stage ===
The seven teams were drawn into two groups of three and four teams. The winners and the runners-up of each group advanced to the semi-finals.

==== Group A ====
Pos	Team	Pld	W	D	L	GF	GA	GD	Pts	Qualification
1	Uganda	2	2	0	0	8	0	+8	6	Semi-finals
2	Ethiopia	2	0	1	1	2	5	−3	1	Semi-finals
3	Kenya	2	0	1	1	2	7	−5	1	
4	South Sudan (D)	0	0	0	0	0	0	0	0	Disqualified (Note: South Sudan were disqualified from the qualifiers after four of their players failed to pass the MRI test.)

Source: CECAFA
Rules for classification: Group tiebreakers
(D) Disqualified
Notes:
13 December 2020
16:00

Kenya	2–2	Ethiopia
Gachago 14'; Rajab 84'	Report	Jiru 61'; Nagash 90+4' (pen.)

Umuganda Stadium, Gisenyi
Referee: Djaffari Nduwimana (Burundi)

16 December 2020
12:00

Uganda	5–0	Kenya
Mawa 8', 50', 54'; Mutyaba 77'; Madoi 84'	Report

Umuganda Stadium, Gisenyi
Referee: Mohamed Diraneh (Djibouti)

18 December 2020
15:00

Uganda	3–0	Ethiopia
Mawa 17', 62'; Irinimbabazi 35'	Report

Umuganda Stadium, Gisenyi
Referee: Emmanuel Mwandembwa (Tanzania)

==== Group B ====
Pos	Team	Pld	W	D	L	GF	GA	GD	Pts	Qualification
1	Tanzania	2	1	1	0	4	2	+2	4	Semi-finals
2	Djibouti	2	0	2	0	1	1	0	2	Semi-finals
3	Rwanda (H)	2	0	1	1	1	3	−2	1	

Source: CECAFA
Rules for classification: Group tiebreakers
(H) Hosts
14 December 2020
15:30

Rwanda	1–3	Tanzania
Irihamye 19' (pen.)	Report	Yahaya 10'; Mvungi 14', 61'

Umuganda Stadium, Gisenyi
Referee: Sabri Fadul (Sudan)

16 December 2020
17:00

Rwanda	0–0	Djibouti
	Report

Umuganda Stadium, Gisenyi
Referee: Tewodros Mitiku (Ethiopia)

18 December 2020
12:00

Djibouti	1–1	Tanzania
M. Ali 80'	Report	Mouhoumed 33' (o.g.)

Umuganda Stadium, Gisenyi
Referee: Shamirah Nabadda (Uganda)

=== Knockout stage ===
In the knockout stages, if a match is level at the end of normal playing time, a penalty shoot-out without extra time was used to determine the winners.

Semi-finals
20 December – Umuganda Stadium
Uganda	1
Djibouti	0
20 December – Umuganda Stadium
Tanzania	1 (4)
Ethiopia	1 (3)

Final
22 December – Umuganda Stadium
Uganda	3
Tanzania	1
Third place
22 December – Umuganda Stadium
Djibouti	2
Ethiopia	5

==== Semifinals ====
20 December 2020
12:00

Uganda	1–0	Djibouti
Mawa 89'	Report

Umuganda Stadium, Gisenyi
Referee: Omar Artan (Somalia)
20 December 2020
15:00

Tanzania	1–1	Ethiopia
Bakari 38'	Report	Ganta 72'
Penalties
Mbarak (penalty scored); Lubotile (penalty scored); Chasambi (penalty scored); Bakari (penalty missed); Lidah (penalty scored)	4–3	(penalty scored) Nagash; (penalty missed) Jiru; (penalty missed) Shamil; (penalty scored) Bakalo; (penalty scored) Seid

Umuganda Stadium, Gisenyi
Referee: Samuel Uwikunda (Rwanda)

==== Third Place match ====
22 December 2020
12:00

Djibouti	2–5	Ethiopia
Hadi 56', 77'	Report	Bakalo 18', 35'; Jiru 36'; Rameto 58', 72'

Umuganda Stadium, Gisenyi
Referee: Djaffari Nduwimana (Burundi)

==== Final ====
22 December 2020
15:30

Uganda	3–1	Tanzania
Irinimbabazi 63'; Mutyaba 80'; Juma 90' (pen.)	Report	Mulema 88' (o.g.)

Umuganda Stadium, Gisenyi
Referee: Omar Artan (Somalia)

== South Zone ==
The COSAFA U-17 Championship was initially planned to be hosted by Malawi between 22 July–1 August 2020 with the matches planned to be played at Blantyre, as the region's qualifying tournament. Malawi, however, were not able to host the tournament due to the COVID-19 pandemic. The hosting rights were later awarded to South Africa with the matches being played at Nelson Mandela Bay (Gelvandale Stadium and Westbourne Oval Stadium).

All times are local, SAST (UTC+2).

=== Group stage ===
Eight teams were drawn into two groups during the draw. South Africa, Angola, Zimbabwe, and Eswatini were drawn into Group A and Zambia, Botswana, Malawi and Comoros were drawn into Group B. However, on 20 November after the first set of matches were already played on 19 November, 4 teams namely – Botswana, Comoros, Eswatini and Zimbabwe were disqualified from the tournament for having at least one of their players fail the magnetic resonance imaging (MRI) test. The tournament was later restarted on 22 November 2020 as a four-team tournament and was played on a round-robin basis. The matches which had been played were then later regarded as warm-up games with no bearing to the new tournament format.

Pos	Team	Pld	W	D	L	GF	GA	GD	Pts	Qualification
1	Zambia	3	3	0	0	9	3	+6	9	2021 Africa U-17 Cup of Nations
2	South Africa (H)	3	1	1	1	4	4	0	4	2021 Africa U-17 Cup of Nations
3	Angola	3	1	0	2	9	5	+4	3	
4	Malawi	3	0	1	2	5	15	−10	1	

Source: COSAFA
Rules for classification: Group tiebreakers
(H) Hosts
22 November 2020
12:30

Angola	1–2	Zambia
Lopes 90+3'	Report	Majapa 51'; Ng’ambi 64' (pen.)

Gelvandale Stadium, Nelson Mandela Bay
Referee: Tshepo Gobagoba (Botswana)
22 November 2020
15:30

South Africa	2–2	Malawi
Shabalala 46'; Mahlangu 87'	Report	Zakeyu 36'; Banda 65'

Gelvandale Stadium, Nelson Mandela Bay
Referee: Thanks Nyahuye (Zimbabwe)

24 November 2020
12:30

South Africa	2–1	Angola
Shabalala 45+2'; Francis 61'	Report	Kossi 56'

Gelvandale Stadium, Nelson Mandela Bay
Referee: Lawrence Zimondi (Zimbabwe)
24 November 2020
15:30

Zambia	6–2	Malawi
Banda 11', 44', 49'; Ng’ambi 16'; Majapa 47'; Khumalo 84'	Report	Mphasi 58', 72'

Gelvandale Stadium, Nelson Mandela Bay
Referee: Artur Alfinar (Mozambique)

26 November 2020
15:30

Malawi	1–7	Angola
Zakeyu 80'	Report	Domingos 30'; Hequele 40', 42', 67' (pen.); Canji 82'; Cucao 90+1'; Inga 90+4'

Westbourne Oval Stadium, Nelson Mandela Bay
Referee: Luxolo Badi (South Africa)
26 November 2020
15:30

Zambia	1–0	South Africa
Banda 84'	Report

Gelvandale Stadium, Nelson Mandela Bay
Referee: Thulani Sibandze (Eswatini)

=== Third place match ===
29 November 2020
10:00

Angola	2–1	Malawi
Kossi 9'; Hequele 41'	Report	Lameck 1'

Gelvandale Stadium, Nelson Mandela Bay
Referee: Vistoria Shangula (Namibia)

=== Final ===
29 November 2020
15:00

Zambia	1–1	South Africa
Banda 2' (pen.)	Report	Mahlangu 14' (pen.)
Penalties
Chaiwa (penalty missed); Banda (penalty scored); Majapa (penalty scored); Ng’ambi (penalty missed)	2–4	(penalty scored) Sishi; (penalty missed) Mgiba; (penalty scored) Phalane; (penalty scored) Dopolo; (penalty scored) Dithejane

Gelvandale Stadium, Nelson Mandela Bay
Referee: Artur Alfinar (Mozambique)

== Qualified teams ==
The following 12 teams qualify for the final tournament.

Team	Zone	Qualified on	Previous appearances in Africa U-17 Cup of Nations^{1} only final tournament era (since 1995)
Morocco (hosts)	North Zone	28 September 2018	2 (2013, 2019)
Algeria	North Zone	24 January 2021	1 (2009)
Senegal	West A Zone	11 February 2021	2 (2011, 2019)
Mali	West A Zone	11 February 2021	8 (1995, 1997, 1999, 2001, 2005, 2011, **2015**, **2017**)
Nigeria	West B Zone	15 January 2021	9 (1995, 1999, **2001**, 2003, 2005, **2007**, 2013, 2015, 2019)
Ivory Coast	West B Zone	15 January 2021	5 (1997, 2005, 2011, **2013**, 2015)
Cameroon	Central Zone	20 February 2021	7 (1999, 2001, **2003**, 2009, 2015, 2017, **2019**)
Congo	Central Zone	20 February 2021	2 (2011, 2013)
Uganda	Central-East Zone	20 December 2020	1 (2019)
Tanzania	Central-East Zone	20 December 2020	2 (2017, 2019)
Zambia	South Zone	24 November 2020	1 (2015)
South Africa	South Zone	26 November 2020	3 (2005, 2007, 2015)

^{1} Bold indicates champions for that year. Italic indicates hosts for that year.

== Goalscorers ==
There were 141 goals scored in 42 matches, for an average of 3.36 goals per match.

6 goals

- (Senegal) Ibou Sané
- (Uganda) Oscar Mawa

5 goals

- (Mali) Bandjoukou Diallo
- (Zambia) Joseph Banda

4 goals

- (Angola) Custódio Hequele

3 goals

- (Ivory Coast) Abdramane Konaté
- (Mali) Sekongo Foungognon
- (Senegal) Mamadou Gning

2 goals

- (Angola) Jeremias Kossi
- (Benin) Yamirou Ouorou
- (Burkina Faso) Abdoul Ouattara
- (Burkina Faso) Gaoussou Diakité
- (Djibouti) Ayoub Hadi
- (Ethiopia) Yodahe Bakalo
- (Ethiopia) Bereket Jiru
- (Ethiopia) Bereket Rameto
- (Ivory Coast) Seydou Traoré
- (Malawi) Chifundo Mphasi
- (Malawi) Samson Zakeyu
- (Mali) Boua Kané
- (Niger) Souleymane Daouda
- (Niger) Abdoulaye Ousmane
- (Nigeria) Ahmed Abdullahi
- (Senegal) Modou Niang
- (South Africa) Thabang Mahlangu
- (South Africa) Mduduzi Shabalala
- (Tanzania) Omar Mvungi
- (Uganda) Ivan Irinimbabazi
- (Uganda) Travis Mutyaba
- (Zambia) Charles Majapa
- (Zambia) Rickson Ng’ambi

1 goal

- (Algeria) Djibril Nottebaere
- (Algeria) Mohamed Rafik Omar
- (Algeria) Anis Ouchouache
- (Algeria) Edhy Zuliani
- (Angola) Armindo Canji
- (Angola) Alexandre Cucao
- (Angola) Vicente Domingos
- (Angola) Osvaldo Inga
- (Angola) António Lopes
- (Burkina Faso) Zakaria Tinta
- (Burkina Faso) Bachirou Yaméogo
- (Djibouti) Moktar Djama Ali
- (Ethiopia) Mikiyas Ganta
- (Ethiopia) Miraj Nagash
- (The Gambia) Mahmudu Bajo
- (The Gambia) Abdoulie Baldeh
- (The Gambia) Bakary Jatta
- (The Gambia) Modou Marong
- (Ghana) John Batigi
- (Ghana) Abdul Fatawu Issahaku
- (Guinea-Bissau) Patrick Pessi
- (Ivory Coast) Cédric Don
- (Ivory Coast) Sindou Koné
- (Ivory Coast) Charles Likpa
- (Kenya) James Gachago
- (Kenya) Umar Rajab
- (Libya) Abdulsamia Abdulnabi
- (Libya) Abdulmuyassir Boushibah
- (Malawi) Stevie Banda
- (Malawi) Andrew Lameck
- (Mali) Tidiane Danioko
- (Mali) Mamadou Doumbia
- (Mali) Yacouba Koïta
- (Mali) Yacouba Maïga
- (Mali) Abdoul Traoré
- (Mauritania) Oumar Ngom
- (Niger) Harouna Hassane
- (Nigeria) Joseph Arumala
- (Nigeria) Michael Emmanuel
- (Rwanda) Eric Irihamye
- (Senegal) Ousmane Diop
- (Senegal) Mame Faye
- (Senegal) Famady Traoré
- (South Africa) Keaviano Francis
- (Tanzania) Omari Bakari
- (Tanzania) Kassimu Yahaya
- (Togo) Mawussi Adohoun
- (Togo) Kokou Dotsè
- (Togo) Baboulin Kolani
- (Togo) Ouzeroudine Kpérédja
- (Togo) Robert Sedzro
- (Tunisia) Firas Mahdouani
- (Tunisia) Youssef Senana
- (Tunisia) Mohamed Nasser Trabelsi
- (Uganda) Ibrahim Juma
- (Uganda) Ronald Madoi
- (Zambia) Teddy Khumalo

1 own goal

- (Algeria) Djibril Nottebaere (against Libya)
- (Djibouti) Abdek Mouhoumed (against Tanzania)
- (Uganda) Vincent Mulema (against Tanzania)
