= 2015 African U-17 Championship qualification =

Tournament details
- Dates: 14 June – 28 September 2014
- Teams: 38 (from 1 confederation)

Tournament statistics
- Matches played: 43
- Goals scored: 111 (2.58 per match)
- Top scorer(s): (Zambia) Patson Daka (5 goals)

The qualification phase of the 2015 African U-17 Championship decided the participating teams of the final tournament. A total of eight teams will play in the final tournament, to be hosted by Niger.

Qualification ties were played on a home-and-away two-legged basis. If the sides were level on aggregate after the second leg, the away goals rule was applied, and if still level, the tie proceeded directly to a penalty shoot-out (no extra time was played).

== Player eligibility ==
During CAF Executive Committee meetings held on 21 and 22 September 2013, the CAF Medical Committee was instructed to continue the use of Magnetic resonance imaging (MRI) scans to determine the ages of players and consequently their eligibility to participate in the qualifying stages of the tournament. It was also directed to ensure the authenticity of the process as well as the identity of the players involved.

== Teams ==
A total of 38 teams entered the qualification phase.

Round	Teams entering round	No. of teams
Did not enter	Algeria; Cape Verde; Chad; Comoros; Djibouti; Equatorial Guinea; Eritrea; Lesotho; Madagascar; Malawi; Mauritius; São Tomé and Príncipe; Somalia; Swaziland; Zimbabwe	15
First round	Burundi; Cameroon; Central African Republic; DR Congo; Egypt; Gambia; Guinea; Guinea-Bissau; Kenya; Liberia; Libya; Mauritania; Mozambique; Namibia; Seychelles; Sierra Leone; South Sudan; Sudan; Togo; Uganda	20
Second round	Angola; Benin; Botswana; Burkina Faso; Congo; Ethiopia; Gabon; Ghana; Ivory Coast; Mali; Morocco; Nigeria; Rwanda; Senegal; South Africa; Tanzania; Tunisia; Zambia	18
Final tournament	Niger (hosts)	1

== First round ==
The first legs were scheduled for 13–15 June 2014, and the second legs were scheduled for 27–29 June 2014.

Team 1	Agg.	Team 2	1st leg	2nd leg
Burundi	w/o (Note: Burundi withdrew.)	DR Congo	—	—
Guinea-Bissau	w/o (Note: Guinea Bissau withdrew.)	Togo	—	—
Gambia	awd. (Note: Gambia were disqualified after fielding five over-age players in 2015 African U-20 Championship qualification.)	Guinea	—	—
Cameroon	w/o (Note: Central African Republic withdrew.)	Central African Republic	—	—
Mozambique	2–1	Namibia	1–1	1–0
Seychelles	1–5	Uganda	1–2	0–3
Egypt	7–3	Sudan	4–2	3–1
Libya	w/o (Note: Mauritania withdrew.)	Mauritania	—	—
Kenya	w/o (Note: Kenya withdrew.)	South Sudan	—	—
Liberia	w/o (Note: Liberia withdrew.)	Sierra Leone	—	—

Notes

13 June 2014

Burundi	Cancelled	DR Congo
	Report

27 June 2014

DR Congo	Cancelled	Burundi
	Report

DR Congo won on default.

13 June 2014

Guinea-Bissau	Cancelled	Togo
	Report

27 June 2014

Togo	Cancelled	Guinea-Bissau
	Report

Togo won on default.

13 June 2014

Gambia	Cancelled	Guinea
	Report

27 June 2014

Guinea	Cancelled	Gambia
	Report

Guinea won on default.

13 June 2014

Cameroon	Cancelled	Central African Republic
	Report

27 June 2014

Central African Republic	Cancelled	Cameroon
	Report

Cameroon won on default.

14 June 2014
15:00 UTC+2

Mozambique	1–1	Namibia
Adriano H Dos Santos 90'	Report	Tuhafeni Ndaheke Khitago Leonard 21'

Estádio Da Liga Muçulmana, Matola
Referee: Dennis Nguluwe (Malawi)
28 June 2014
15:00 UTC+1

Namibia	0–1	Mozambique
	Report	Edmilson Xavier Mucavele 53'

Sam Nujoma Stadium, Windhoek
Referee: Stanley Hachiwa (Zambia)

Mozambique won 2–1 on aggregate.

14 June 2014
16:30 UTC+4

Seychelles	1–2	Uganda
Hoareau Darian 71'	Report	Sebutinde Charles 20'; Obuya Pius 72'

Stade Linité, Victoria
Referee: Andofetra Avombitana Rakotojaona (Madagascar)
28 June 2014
16:00 UTC+3

Uganda	3–0	Seychelles
Sebutinde Charles 2'; Obuya Pius 22'; Olinga Emmanuel 35'	Report

Lugogo Stadium, Kampala
Referee: El Fatih Wadeed Khaleel

Uganda won 5–1 on aggregate.

15 June 2014
19:00 UTC+3

Egypt	4–2	Sudan
Adel Mohamed Houssem Adel 33' (pen.); Karim Yahia Abderahman 44'; Walid Atia Mourad 55'; Mohamed Alaeddine Mohamed 74'	Report	Eid Mogadam Abacar 6'; Mohamed Salaheddine 88'

Alexandria Stadium, Alexandria
Referee: Nasrallah Jaouadi (Tunisia)
27 June 2014
16:00 UTC+3

Sudan	1–3	Egypt
Anas Adam Moussa 38'	Report	Walid Atia Mourad 50'; Alfiel Amin Alfiel 67' (o.g.); Ahmed Hamdi 77'

Khartoum Stadium, Khartoum

Egypt won 7–3 on aggregate.

15 June 2014
19:00 UTC+3

Libya	Cancelled	Mauritania
	Report

Petro Sport Stadium, Cairo (Egypt)
27 June 2014

Mauritania	Cancelled	Libya
	Report

Libya won on default.

13 June 2014

Kenya	Cancelled	South Sudan
	Report

27 June 2014

South Sudan	Cancelled	Kenya
	Report

South Sudan won on default.

13 June 2014

Liberia	Cancelled	Sierra Leone
	Report

27 June 2014

Sierra Leone	Cancelled	Liberia
	Report

Sierra Leone won on default.

== Second round ==
The first legs were scheduled for 18–20 July 2014 (DR Congo vs Nigeria postponed to 26 July due to FIFA's suspension of Nigerian FA), and the second legs were scheduled for 1–3 August 2014.

Team 1	Agg.	Team 2	1st leg	2nd leg
DR Congo	0–5	Nigeria	0–1	0–4
Ethiopia	0–3	Gabon	0–0	0–3
Togo	1–1 (a)	Senegal	0–0	1–1
Guinea	3–1	Morocco	1–0	2–1
South Sudan	w/o (Note: South Sudan withdrew)	Ghana	—	—
Cameroon	2–0	Burkina Faso	2–0	0–0
Libya	w/o (Note: Libya withdrew)	Ivory Coast	0–4	—
Mozambique	2–3	Angola	2–1	0–2
Uganda	7–2	Rwanda	4–0	3–2
Zambia	6–0	Botswana	1–0	5–0
Sierra Leone	w/o (Note: Sierra Leone withdrew)	Tunisia	—	—
Benin	awd. (Note: Benin were disqualified for fielding four ineligible players.)	Mali	1–0	0–0
Egypt	1–1 (6–5 p)	Congo	1–0	0–1
Tanzania	0–4	South Africa	0–0	0–4

Notes

26 July 2014
15:30 UTC+1

DR Congo	0–1	Nigeria
	Report	Osimhen 13'

Stade Tata Raphaël, Kinshasa
Referee: Antoine Max Depadoux Effa Essouma (Cameroon)
3 August 2014
16:00 UTC+1

Nigeria	4–0	DR Congo
Suleiman Abdullahi 30'; Osimhen 42'; Ayinde Kehinde 66'; Chukwueze Samuel 90'	Report

MKO Abiola Stadium, Abeokuta
Referee: Abou Coulibaly (Ivory Coast)

Nigeria won 5–0 on aggregate.

20 July 2014
16:00 UTC+3

Ethiopia	0–0	Gabon
	Report

Addis Ababa Stadium, Addis Ababa
Referee: Alex Muhabi Nsulumbi (Uganda)
2 August 2014
15:30 UTC+1

Gabon	3–0	Ethiopia
Ngouba Hoily 63' (pen.), 74' (pen.); Mayoulou.M Maitin Ch. 89'	Report

Stade Augustin Monédan de Sibang, Libreville
Referee: Messie Jessie Oved Nkounkou Mvoutou (Congo)

Gabon won 3–0 on aggregate.

20 July 2014
15:30 UTC±0

Togo	0–0	Senegal
	Report

Stade Municipal, Lomé
Referee: Akintoye Germain Koole (Benin)
2 August 2014
17:00 UTC±0

Senegal	1–1	Togo
Ousseynou Ndiaye 79'	Report	Raoul Adangba 54'

Stade Caroline Faye, M'Bour
Referee: Ousmane Sidibe (Mali)

1–1 on aggregate. Togo won on away goals.

20 July 2014
16:00 UTC±0

Guinea	1–0	Morocco
Naby Banoura 57'	Report

Stade du 28 Septembre, Conakry
Referee: Antonio Manuel Fortes Rodrigues (Cape Verde)
3 August 2014
17:00 UTC±0

Morocco	1–2	Guinea
Omar Boustan 53'	Report	Naby Banoura 12', 89'

Stade El Abdi, El Jadida
Referee: Abderahmane Kelly (Mauritania)

Guinea won 3–1 on aggregate.

18 July 2014

South Sudan	Cancelled	Ghana
	Report

Referee: Farah Aden Ali (Djibouti)
1 August 2014

Ghana	Cancelled	South Sudan
	Report

Referee: Daouda Kebe

Ghana won on default.

19 July 2014
15:30 UTC+1

Cameroon	2–0	Burkina Faso
Armel Nguene Ii 3'; Thomas Olivier Amang A Kegueni 76'	Report

Stade Ahmadou Ahidjo, Yaoundé
Referee: Alhadi Allaou Mahamat (Chad)
2 August 2014
15:30 UTC±0

Burkina Faso	0–0	Cameroon
	Report

Stade du 4-Août, Ouagadougou
Referee: Ferdinand Udoh Anietie (Nigeria)

Cameroon won 2–0 on aggregate.

20 July 2014
22:00 UTC+1

Libya	0–4	Ivory Coast
	Report	Wily Braciano Ta Bi 30'; Baba Lamine Traore 58', 65'; Nguessan Jonas Kouadio 90'

Stade El Menzah, Tunis
Referee: Mohamed Marouf (Egypt)
1 August 2014

Ivory Coast	Cancelled	Libya
	Report

Ivory Coast won on default.

19 July 2014
15:00 UTC+2

Mozambique	2–1	Angola
Edmilson Xavier Mucavele 80'; Hermengildo Mario Capena 84'	Report	Zinadine Zidane Moises Catraio 9'

Estádio Da Liga Muçulmana, Matola
Referee: Abdoul Karim Twagiramukiza (Rwanda)
2 August 2014
15:30 UTC+1

Angola	2–0	Mozambique
Nelson da Luz 12'; Zinadine Zidane Moises Catraio 75'	Report

Estádio dos Coqueiros, Luanda
Referee: Matheola Phillip Makhobalo (Lesotho)

Angola won 3–2 on aggregate.

19 July 2014
14:00 UTC+3

Uganda	4–0	Rwanda
Muhammad Shaban 9', 87'; Obuya Pius 61'; Poloto Julius 66'	Report

Mandela National Stadium, Kampala
Referee: Jean Claude Kinamvuidi Fuengi (DR Congo)
1 August 2014
15:00 UTC+2

Rwanda	2–3	Uganda
Bigiraneza Rachid 49', 62'	Report	Sebutinde Charles 32'; Poloto Julius 44'; Muhammad Shaban 71'

Umuganda Stadium, Gisenyi

Uganda won 7–2 on aggregate.

20 July 2014
15:00 UTC+2

Zambia	1–0	Botswana
Mwepu 52'	Report

Sunset Stadium, Lusaka
Referee: Jonas Shongedi (Namibia)
1 August 2014
18:00 UTC+2

Botswana	0–5	Zambia
	Report	Mwepu 20' (pen.); Pumulo Siwanga 37'; Daka 84', 90+4'; Garry Mwelwa 90+5'

University of Botswana Stadium, Gaborone
Referee: Norman Matemera (Zimbabwe)

Zambia won 6–0 on aggregate.

18 July 2014

Sierra Leone	Cancelled	Tunisia
	Report

Referee: Baba Leno (Guinea)
1 August 2014

Tunisia	Cancelled	Sierra Leone
	Report

Referee: Badr El Din Abdel Gadir

Tunisia won on default.

19 July 2014
16:00 UTC+1

Benin	1–0	Mali
Ibilola 50'	Report

Stade Charles de Gaulle, Porto-Novo
Referee: Prosper Adii (Ghana)
2 August 2014
16:30 UTC±0

Mali	0–0	Benin
	Report

Stade Modibo Kéïta, Bamako
Referee: Gomno Daouda (Niger)

Mali won on default.

20 July 2014
22:00 UTC+2

Egypt	1–0	Congo
Walid Atia Mourad 81'	Report

Osman Ahmed Osman Stadium, Cairo
Referee: Yemane A.Gebremedhin (Eritrea)
3 August 2014
15:30 UTC+1

Congo	1–0	Egypt
Vindou Image Gilson 8'	Report
Penalties
	6–5

Stade Municipal, Pointe-Noire
Referee: Diosdado Nzibi Nie (Equatorial Guinea)

1–1 on aggregate. Egypt won penalties.

18 July 2014
16:00 UTC+3

Tanzania	0–0	South Africa
	Report

Chamazi Stadium, Dar es Salaam
Referee: Allaister Barra (Seychelles)
2 August 2014
15:00 UTC+2

South Africa	4–0	Tanzania
Edwin Sekhwama 2'; Khanyiso Mayo 71', 80'; Thendo Mukumela 90'	Report

Dobsonville Stadium, Johannesburg
Referee: Mbongiseni Elliot Fakudze (Swaziland)

South Africa won 4–0 on aggregate.

== Third round ==
The first legs were scheduled for 12–14 September 2014, and the second legs were scheduled for 26–28 September 2014.

Team 1	Agg.	Team 2	1st leg	2nd leg
Gabon	2–6	Nigeria	2–1	0–5
Guinea	4–0	Togo	1–0	3–0
Cameroon	awd. (Note: Ghana were disqualified on 26 October 2014, after medical test provided by the African Confederation after their first leg play off victory against Cameroon found that one of their players failed age eligibility confirmations. Ghana appealed but failed.)	Ghana	1–2	3–4
Angola	1–4	Ivory Coast	1–1	0–3
Zambia	4–1	Uganda	2–0	2–1
Mali	5–1	Tunisia	2–0	3–1
South Africa	4–3	Egypt	2–1	2–2

Notes

14 September 2014
15:30 UTC+1

Gabon	2–1	Nigeria
Ngouba Hoily 25', 81'	Report	Victor Osimhen 4'

Stade Augustin Monédan de Sibang, Libreville
Referee: Jean Marc Ganamandji (Central African Republic)
27 September 2014
16:00 UTC+1

Nigeria	5–0	Gabon
Kelechi Nwakali 21' (pen.); Christian Ebere 30', 42'; Kehinde Ayinde 65', 89'	Report

U. J. Esuene Stadium, Calabar
Referee: Noureddine El Jaafari (Morocco)

Nigeria won 6–2 on aggregate.

14 September 2014
17:00 UTC+1

Guinea	1–0	Togo
Yamodou Touré 69'	Report

Stade El Abdi, El Jadida (Morocco)
Referee: Sheriff Njie (Gambia)
28 September 2014
15:30 UTC±0

Togo	0–3	Guinea
	Report	Yamodou Touré 69'; Morlaye Sylla 81'; Lansana Touré 90'

Stade Municipal, Lomé
Referee: Christopher Nde

Guinea won 4–0 on aggregate.

13 September 2014
15:00 UTC+1

Cameroon	1–2	Ghana
Martin Hongla 45'	Report	Ernest Agyiri 30'; Issah Abass 40'

Stade Ahmadou Ahidjo, Yaoundé
Referee: Jean-Jacques Ngambo Ndala (DR Congo)
28 September 2014
15:00 UTC±0

Ghana	4–3	Cameroon
Issah Abass 5'; Henry Medarious 17', 79'; Jonah Osabutey 36'	Report	Armel Nguene Ii 43'; Christian Bayemi 47'; Fokem Namekong Achille 87'

Accra Sports Stadium, Accra
Referee: Abou Coulibaly (Ivory Coast)

Cameroon won on default.

13 September 2014
15:30 UTC+1

Angola	1–1	Ivory Coast
Nelson da Luz 78'	Report	Koffi Kouao 77'

Estádio dos Coqueiros, Luanda
Referee: Dennis Nguluwe (Malawi)
27 September 2014
15:00 UTC±0

Ivory Coast	3–0	Angola
Baba Lamine Traoré 45', 56'; Nguessan Jonas Kouadio 77'	Report

Stade Robert Champroux, Abidjan
Referee: Akintoye Germain Koole (Benin)

Ivory Coast won 4–1 on aggregate.

12 September 2014
15:00 UTC+2

Zambia	2–0	Uganda
Patson Daka 26'; Edwin Chipile 61'	Report

Nkoloma Stadium, Lusaka
Referee: Gervais Munyanziza (Rwanda)
27 September 2014
16:00 UTC+3

Uganda	1–2	Zambia
Alex Komakech 71' (pen.)	Report	Patson Daka 21', 67'

Nakivubo Stadium, Kampala
Referee: Nelson Emile Fred (Seychelles)

Zambia won 4–1 on aggregate.

14 September 2014
16:00 UTC±0

Mali	2–0	Tunisia
Sidiki Maiga 61'; Boubacar Traoré 77'	Report

Stade Modibo Kéïta, Bamako
Referee: Daouda Kebe (Senegal)
28 September 2014
16:00 UTC+1

Tunisia	1–3	Mali
Wael Oueslati 45'	Report	Boubacar Traoré 67'; Sidiki Maiga 77', 82'

Stade Chedli Zouiten, Tunis
Referee: Mohamed Abd Elmenem El Hanafy (Egypt)

Mali won 5–1 on aggregate.

13 September 2014
18:00 UTC+2

South Africa	2–1	Egypt
Edwin Sekhwama 26'; Vuyo Mantjie 48'	Report	Walid Attia Mourad Attia Ali 45'

Moruleng Stadium, Saulspoort
Referee: Sentso John Mohau (Lesotho)
27 September 2014
19:00 UTC+2

Egypt	2–2	South Africa
Ahmed Hamdi 53'; Mokhtar Mohamed Soliman Mohamed 79'	Report	Khanyiso Mayo 17', 39'

Osman Ahmed Osman Stadium, Cairo
Referee: Pacifique Ndabihawenimana (Burundi)

South Africa won 4–3 on aggregate.

== Qualified teams ==
- Cameroon
- Guinea
- Ivory Coast
- Mali
- Niger (hosts)
- Nigeria
- South Africa
- Zambia
