= 2007 African U-17 Championship qualification =

The 2007 African U-17 Championship qualification was a men's under-17 football competition which decided the participating teams of the 2007 African U-17 Championship.

== Preliminary round ==
The first leg matches were played on either the 14th, 15th, 16th or 17 July 2006. The second leg matches were played on 29 July 2006. The winners advanced to the First Round.

Team 1	Agg.	Team 2	1st leg	2nd leg
Algeria	0 – 4	Mauritania	0 – 0	0 – 4
Chad	2 – 3	Gabon	1 – 0	1 – 3
Réunion	4 – 1	Mauritius	4 – 1	0 – 0
Libya	2 – 3	Eritrea	2 – 1	0 – 2
Mozambique	1 – 4	Zambia	1 – 2	0 – 2
Malawi	4 – 2	Lesotho	3 – 0	1 – 2
Sudan	4 – 1	Djibouti	4 – 1	
Rwanda	2 – 0	Somalia	2 – 0	
DR Congo	w/o	Central African Republic	1 – 1	w/o
Senegal	w/o	Liberia	–	–
Namibia	w/o	Botswana	–	–
Benin	w/o	Congo	–	–
Uganda	w/o	Ethiopia	–	–

== First round ==
The first leg matches were played on either the 16th or 17 September 2006. The second leg matches were played on 14 October 2006. The winners advanced to the Second Round.

Team 1	Agg.	Team 2	1st leg	2nd leg
Tunisia	2 – 1	Mauritania	1 – 1	1 – 0
Gambia	0 – 4	Senegal	0 – 2	0 – 2
Angola	1 – 5	Gabon	1 – 1	0 – 4
Cameroon	1 – 2	Central African Republic	0 – 1	1 – 1
South Africa	9 – 1	Botswana	6 – 0	3 – 1
Zimbabwe	2 – 2 (p 4 – 2)	Réunion	1 – 1	1 – 1
Egypt	1 – 2	Eritrea	1 – 1	0 – 1
Sudan	1 – 6	Zambia	0 – 3	1 – 3
Ghana	4 – 2	Guinea	3 – 1	1 – 1
Nigeria	6 – 2	Rwanda	3 – 0	3 – 2
Mali	5 – 0	Malawi	3 – 0	2 – 0
Burkina Faso	3 – 2	Ethiopia	1 – 0	2 – 2
Ivory Coast	w/o	Benin	–	–
Sierra Leone	w/o	Morocco	–	–

== Second round ==
The first leg matches were played on either the 24th, 25th or 26 November 2006. The second leg matches were played on 9th or 10 December 2006. The winners advanced to the Finals.

Team 1	Agg.	Team 2	1st leg	2nd leg
Tunisia	1 – 1 (p 4 – 2)	Senegal	1 – 0	0 – 1
Gabon	3 – 2	Central African Republic	1 – 2	2 – 0
South Africa	7 – 3	Zimbabwe	5 – 1	2 – 2
Eritrea	3 – 0	Zambia	1 – 0	2 – 0
Ivory Coast	3 – 3 (a)	Ghana	3 – 1	0 – 2
Nigeria	5 – 1	Morocco	5 – 0	0 – 1
Mali	1 – 6	Burkina Faso	1 – 6	0 – 0

== Qualified teams ==
- Burkina Faso
- Eritrea
- Gabon
- Ghana
- Nigeria
- South Africa
- Togo (host nation)
- Tunisia
