= 2017 U-17 Africa Cup of Nations qualification =

2017 Africa U-17 Cup of Nations qualification
Tournament details
- Dates: 24 June – 2 October 2016
- Teams: 39 (from 1 confederation)

Tournament statistics
- Matches played: 51
- Goals scored: 169 (3.31 per match)

The qualification phase of the 2017 Africa U-17 Cup of Nations decided the participating teams of the final tournament. A total of eight teams played in the final tournament, hosted by Gabon.

The draws were conducted during the CAF Executive Committee meeting held on Friday, 5 February 2016 in Kigali, Rwanda.

== Participants ==
No participation	Teams	Number of teams
No participation	Burundi; Cape Verde; Central African Republic; Equatorial Guinea; Eritrea; Gambia; Guinea-Bissau; Rwanda; São Tomé and Príncipe; Somalia; South Sudan; Swaziland; Togo; Uganda	14
First round entrants	Algeria; Benin; Botswana; Chad; Comoros; Djibouti; DR Congo; Ghana; Kenya; Lesotho; Liberia; Libya; Malawi; Mauritania; Mauritius; Morocco; Namibia; Seychelles; Sierra Leone; Sudan; Tanzania; Zimbabwe	22
Second round entrants	Angola; Burkina Faso; Cameroon; Congo; Egypt; Ethiopia; Gabon; Guinea; Ivory Coast; Mali; Mozambique; Niger; Nigeria; Senegal; South Africa; Tunisia; Zambia	17
Final tournament entrants	Madagascar (hosts)	1

Note: Madagascar were originally to qualify automatically as hosts, but had their hosting rights withdrawn and were replaced by Gabon (which played in the qualifiers and were eliminated in the third round).

== Format ==
Qualification ties were played on a home-and-away two-legged basis. If the aggregate score was tied after the second leg, the away goals rule would be applied, and if still level, the penalty shoot-out would be used to determine the winner (no extra time would be played).

The seven winners of the third round qualified for the final tournament.

== First round ==
The first legs are scheduled for 24–26 June 2016, and the second legs are scheduled for 1–3 July 2016.

Team 1	Agg.	Team 2	1st leg	2nd leg
Ghana	w/o	Liberia	—	—
Benin	w/o	Sierra Leone	—	—
Libya	4–4 (a)	Algeria	3–2	1–2
DR Congo	w/o	Chad	—	—
Mauritania	1–2	Morocco	1–0	0–2
Sudan	16–0	Djibouti	8–0	8–0
Malawi	w/o	Kenya	—	—
Tanzania	9–0	Seychelles	3–0	6–0
Namibia	2–2 (a)	Botswana	1–0	1–2
Lesotho	w/o	Mauritius	—	—
Comoros	w/o	Zimbabwe	—	—

June 2016

Ghana	Cancelled	Liberia
	Report

July 2016

Liberia	Cancelled	Ghana
	Report

Ghana advanced after Liberia withdrew.

June 2016

Benin	Cancelled	Sierra Leone
	Report

July 2016

Sierra Leone	Cancelled	Benin
	Report

Benin advanced after Sierra Leone withdrew.

25 June 2016
22:00

Libya	3–2	Algeria
Gima Dago 27'; Tougaï 70' (pen.); Bin Amir 90+3'	Report	Dehiri 12'; Idir 55'

Stade Omar Hamadi, Algiers
Referee: Samir Guezzaz (Morocco)
29 June 2016
22:00

Algeria	2–1	Libya
Louanchi 35'; Tougaï 90'	Report	Alanteir 64'

Stade Omar Hamadi, Algiers
Referee: Nasrallah Jawadi (Tunisia)

4–4 on aggregate. Algeria won on away goals.

June 2016

DR Congo	Cancelled	Chad
	Report

July 2016

Chad	Cancelled	DR Congo
	Report

Chad advanced after DR Congo withdrew.

25 June 2016
22:00

Mauritania	1–0	Morocco
Cheikh 73'	Report

Stade Olympique, Nouakchott
Referee: Raymond Coker (Sierra Leone)
2 July 2016
21:45

Morocco	2–0	Mauritania
Abessi 8', 90+2'	Report

Stade Prince Moulay Al Hassan, Rabat
Referee: Lahlou Benbraham (Algeria)

Morocco won 2–1 on aggregate.

26 June 2016
22:00

Sudan	8–0	Djibouti
Mazin Mohamed 11', 21'; Gumaa 53', 60'; Elshaikh 62'; Abduelsamad 65'; Moumen Mohamed 79'; Abdalla 83'	Report

Al-Merrikh Stadium, Omdurman
Referee: Hassan Mohamed Hagi (Somalia)
1 July 2016
21:30

Djibouti	0–8	Sudan
	Report	Elnour 16'; Abdalla 46'; Mustafa 57', 84'; Musab Mohamed 68'; Alzobair 71', 88'; Elmgdad Mohamed 90'

Stade du Ville, Djibouti City
Referee: Abdoul Karim Twagiramukiza (Rwanda)

Sudan won 16–0 on aggregate.

June 2016

Malawi	Cancelled	Kenya
	Report

July 2016

Kenya	Cancelled	Malawi
	Report

Kenya advanced after Malawi withdrew.

26 June 2016
16:00

Tanzania	3–0	Seychelles
Kibabage 16'; Ali 22'; Msengi 62' (pen.)	Report

National Stadium, Dar es Salaam
Referee: Belay Tadesse (Ethiopia)
2 July 2016
16:30

Seychelles	0–6	Tanzania
	Report	Ali 9'; Rashid 43'; Juma 48', 72'; Makamba 63' (pen.); Mkomola 90+2'

Stade Linité, Victoria
Referee: Ahmad Imtehaz Heeralall (Mauritius)

Tanzania won 9–0 on aggregate.

24 June 2016
16:30

Namibia	1–0	Botswana
Uugwanga 90'	Report

Sam Nujoma Stadium, Windhoek
Referee: Pilan Ncube (Zimbabwe)
2 July 2016
15:00

Botswana	2–1	Namibia
Masu 30'; Kaone Bogosi 39'	Report	Awaseb 7'

Lobatse Stadium, Lobatse
Referee: Dennis Nguluwe (Malawi)

2–2 on aggregate. Namibia won on away goals.

June 2016

Lesotho	Cancelled	Mauritius
	Report

July 2016

Mauritius	Cancelled	Lesotho
	Report

Mauritius advanced after Lesotho withdrew.

June 2016

Comoros	Cancelled	Zimbabwe
	Report

July 2016

Zimbabwe	Cancelled	Comoros
	Report

Comoros advanced after Zimbabwe withdrew.

== Second round ==
The first legs are scheduled for 5–7 August 2016, and the second legs are scheduled for 19–21 August 2016.

Team 1	Agg.	Team 2	1st leg	2nd leg
Ghana	6–5	Burkina Faso	5–1	1–4
Benin	2–4	Ivory Coast	1–1	1–3
Nigeria	2–3	Niger	1–0	1–3
Algeria	0–1	Gabon	0–0	0–1
Chad	w/o	Mali	0–9	—
Egypt	2–5	Ethiopia	1–3	1–2
Tunisia	4–6	Senegal	2–3	2–3
Guinea	2–2 (3–2 p)	Morocco	1–1	1–1
Zambia	0–1	Sudan	0–0	0–1
Cameroon	9–1	Kenya	7–0	2–1
South Africa	1–3	Tanzania	1–1	0–2
Namibia	1–5	Congo	1–2	0–3
Mauritius	0–4	Angola	0–1	0–3
Comoros	5–1	Mozambique	2–1	3–0

7 August 2016
15:00

Ghana	5–1	Burkina Faso
Toku 22'; Ayiah 40', 53'; Antah 72'; Onyina 80'	Report	Zoungrana 11'

Cape Coast Sports Stadium, (Cape Coast
Referee: Benjamin Ekabatiem Odey (Nigeria)
20 August 2016
15:30

Burkina Faso	4–1	Ghana
Diarrassouba 11'; Traore 47'; Zongo 72'; Kientega 86'	Report	26' Ayiah

Stade du 4 Août, Ouagadougou
Referee: Kossi Blewoussi Azaleko (Togo)

Ghana won 6–5 on aggregate.

7 August 2016
16:00

Benin	1–1	Ivory Coast
Videkon 45' (pen.)	Report	Akoete 37'

Stade de l'Amitié, Cotonou
Referee: Harouna Coulibaly (Mali)
20 August 2016
15:30

Ivory Coast	3–1	Benin
Akoete 33'; Sangare 40', 43'	Report	Noumonvi 75'

Stade Robert Champroux, Abidjan
Referee: Issa Abdelhadi (Chad)

Ivory Coast won 4–2 on aggregate.

6 August 2016
16:00

Nigeria	1–0	Niger
Alagbe 2'	Report

National Stadium, Abuja
Referee: Serge Flavien Soumou (Congo)
20 August 2016
16:00

Niger	3–1	Nigeria
Assoumane 29'; Habibou 49' (pen.); Sanda 90'	Report	Babalolo 44'

Stade Municipal de Niamey, Niamey
Referee: Henry Duvalier Mouandjo Kalla (Cameroon)

Niger won 3–2 on aggregate.

7 August 2016
19:00

Algeria	0–0	Gabon
	Report

Stade 20 Août 1955, Algiers
Referee: Bakary Camara (Gambia)
20 August 2016
15:30

Gabon	1–0	Algeria
Nzengue 20' (pen.)	Report

Stade Augustin Monédan de Sibang, Libreville
Referee: Malala Kabanga Yannick (DR Congo)

Gabon won 1–0 on aggregate.

13 August 2016
16:00

Chad	0–9	Mali
	Report	Drame 14', 84'; Camara 40', 63'; Kane 54', 82' (pen.); Kane 58'; Tidjani 75' (o.g.); Doumbia 90'

Stade Omnisports Idriss Mahamat Ouya, N'Djamena
Referee: Prince Arcy Dongmbe (Central African Republic)
21 August 2016

Mali	Cancelled	Chad
	Report

Mali advanced after Chad withdrew from the second leg.

6 August 2016
20:00

Egypt	1–3	Ethiopia
Abdelghani 17'	Report	24' Teshita; 41' Nasir; 90+1' Mekonen

Petro Sport Stadium, Cairo
Referee: Samir Guezzaz (Morocco)
21 August 2016
16:00

Ethiopia	2–1	Egypt
Nasir 12', 50'	Report	Elghamarawy 85'

Asfa Wossen Stadium, Dire Dawa
Referee: Mahmood Ali Mahmood Ismail (Sudan)

Ethiopia won 5–2 on aggregate.

7 August 2016
17:00

Tunisia	2–3	Senegal
Smei	Report	59', 63' Yade; 90' Soumare

Stade El Menzah, Tunis
Referee: Babaca Sarr (Mauritius)
20 August 2016
17:00

Senegal	3–2	Tunisia
Drame 76'; Sow 89'; Niang 90'	Report	17' Ghuriani; 88' Taous

Stade Demba Diop, Dakar
Referee: Fabricio Duarte (Cape Verde)

Senegal won 6–4 on aggregate.

7 August 2016
16:00

Guinea	1–1	Morocco
Touré 50'	Report	Ait Ouarkhan 13'

Stade du 28 Septembre, Conakry
Referee: Boureima Sanogo (Burkina Faso)
21 August 2016
21:00

Morocco	1–1	Guinea
Abdelwahed 44'	Report	69' Sylla
Penalties
Abdessamad (penalty missed); Riad (penalty missed); Saif-Eddine (penalty missed)	2–3	(penalty missed) Camara

Stade El Abdi, El Jadida
Referee: Mahmoud Ahmed Mohamed Bassiouny (Egypt)

2–2 on aggregate. Guinea won 3–2 on penalties.

7 August 2016
15:00

Zambia	0–0	Sudan
	Report

Nkoloma Stadium, Lusaka
Referee: Omphile Phuthego (Botswana)
21 August 2016

Sudan	1–0	Zambia
Alzobair 15'	Report

Referee: Martin Sanya (Tanzania)

Sudan won 2–0 on aggregate.

7 August 2016
15:00

Cameroon	7–0	Kenya
Sangola 19'; Zobo 20'; Bella 34', 67'; Manga 40'; Ngakole 42', 51'	Report

Stade Omnisports de Bafoussam, Bafoussam
Referee: Ruzindana Nsoro (Rwanda)
20 August 2016
15:00

Kenya	1–2	Cameroon
Machaka 11'	Report	56' Zobo; 71' Manga

Moi International Sports Centre, Nairobi
Referee: Farah Aden Ali (Djibouti)

Cameroon won 9–1 on aggregate.

6 August 2016
15:00

South Africa	1–1	Tanzania
Le Roux 63' (pen.)	Report	70' (pen.) Msengi

Dobsonville Stadium, Johannesburg
Referee: Osiase William William Koto (Lesotho)
21 August 2016

Tanzania	2–0	South Africa
Rashid 35'; Makame 85'	Report

Referee: Jim Noiret Bacari (Comoros)

Tanzania won 3–1 on aggregate.

6 August 2016
12:00

Namibia	1–2	Congo
Petrus 71'	Report	6', 90' Bercy

Independence Stadium, Windhoek
Referee: Joao Amado Goma (Angola)
21 August 2016

Congo	3–0	Namibia
Kiba-Konde 6'; Mboungou 23' (pen.); Mountou 89'	Report

Congo won 5–1 on aggregate.

7 August 2016
15:00

Mauritius	0–1	Angola
	Report	27' Gelson

Stade George V, Curepipe
Referee: Nelson Ricky Emile (Seychelles)
20 August 2016
15:30

Angola	3–0	Mauritius
Melo 19'; Gelson 45+1'; Abílio 70'	Report

Estádio 22 de Junho, Luanda
Attendance: 2,000
Referee: Simanga Pritchard Nhleko (Swaziland)

Angola won 4–0 on aggregate.

6 August 2016
15:00

Comoros	2–1	Mozambique
Ali 43'; Mohamed 59'	Report	90+1' Sidat

Stade de Moroni, Moroni
Referee: Andrew JUma Otieno (Kenya)
20 August 2016
15:00

Mozambique	0–3	Comoros
	Report	13' Charaf; 58' Soudjay; 89' Ali

Estádio da Machava, Maputo
Referee: Stanley Hachiwa (Zambia)

Comoros won 5–1 on aggregate.

== Third round ==
The first legs were scheduled for 16–18 September 2016, and the second legs were scheduled for 30 September – 2 October 2016.Winners Qualify for the 2017 Africa U-17 Cup of Nations.

Team 1	Agg.	Team 2	1st leg	2nd leg
Ghana	3–1	Ivory Coast	3–1	0–0
Niger	4–3	Gabon	1–0	3–3
Mali	4–1	Ethiopia	2–0	2–1
Senegal	1–2	Guinea	0–1	1–1
Sudan	5–7	Cameroon	4–2	1–5
Tanzania	3–3 (a)	Congo (disqualified)	3–2	0–1
Angola	7–0	Comoros	5–0	2–0

18 September 2016
15:00

Ghana	3–1	Ivory Coast
Ayiah 29', 62'; Toku 31'	Report	74' Sangare

Cape Coast Sports Stadium, Cape Coast
Referee: Mohamed Abd Elmenem El Hanafy (Egypt)
1 October 2016
15:30

Ivory Coast	0–0	Ghana
	Report

Stade Robert Champroux, Abidjan
Referee: Jean Claude Ishimwe (Rwanda)

Ghana won 3–1 on aggregate.

17 September 2016
16:00

Niger	1–0	Gabon
Habibou 75' (pen.)	Report

Stade Municipal de Niamey, Niamey
Referee: Baba Leno (Guinea)
1 October 2016
15:30

Gabon	3–3	Niger
Moubeti 33' 52' (pen.) 90' (pen.)	Report	45' Ajina; 81' 89' Marou

Stade Augustin Monédan de Sibang, Libreville
Referee: Sadok Selmi (Tunisia)

Niger won 4–3 on aggregate.

18 September 2016
16:30

Mali	2–0	Ethiopia
Drame 71' (pen.); Traore 86'	Report

Stade Modibo Kéïta, Bamako
Referee: Daniel Nii Laryea (Ghana)
2 October 2016
16:00

Ethiopia	1–2	Mali
Abebayehu 72'	Report	4' Keita; 90' Toure

Addis Ababa Stadium, Addis Ababa
Referee: Abdoulaye Rhissa Almustapha (Niger)

Mali won 4–1 on aggregate.

17 September 2016
16:00

Senegal	0–1	Guinea
	Report	27' Traore

Stade Demba Diop, Dakar
Referee: Ayman El Sharif (Libya)
3 October 2016
16:30

Guinea	1–1	Senegal
Camara 90'	Report	37' Dieng

Stade du 28 Septembre, Conakry
Referee: Hafiz Abdelghani Alamen (Sudan)

Guinea won 2–1 on aggregate.

18 September 2016
17:00

Sudan	4–2	Cameroon
Mohamed 10' 66'; Gumaa 24'; Abdalla 69'	Report	16' Manga; 53' Nkoto

El Abyad, El Abyad
Referee: Mustapha Ghorbal (Algeria)
2 October 2016
15:00

Cameroon	5–1	Sudan
Zobo 13' 52'; Bella 22'; Sangola 27' 70' (pen.)	Report	85' Alzobair

Stade Omnisports de Bafoussam, Bafoussam
Referee: Tinyiko Victor Hlungwani (South Africa)

Cameroon won 7–5 on aggregate.

18 September 2016
16:00

Tanzania	3–2	Congo
Mkomola 38' 42'; Makamba 82'	Report	74' (pen.) Bercy; 90' Bopoumela

Referee: Nelson Emile Fred (Seychelles)
2 October 2016
15:30

Congo	1–0	Tanzania
Mountou 90'	Report

Stade Alphonse Massemba-Débat, Brazzaville
Referee: Pacifique Ndabihawenimana (Burundi)

3–3 on aggregate. Congo won on away goals.

Later Congo were disqualified from the main tournament as a player failed to show up magnetic resonance imaging test, and therefore Tanzania are qualified instead.

17 September 2016
16:00

Angola	5–0	Comoros
Fernando 9' 42'; Melo 24' 58'; Gelson 83'	Report

Academia de Futebol de Angola, Luanda
Referee: Dennis Nguluwe (Malawi)
1 October 2016
15:00

Comoros	0–2	Angola
	Report	64' Melo; 89' Abílio

Stade de Moroni, Moroni
Referee: Dharamveer Hurbungs (Mauritius)

Angola won 7–0 on aggregate.
