= 2011 African U-17 Championship qualification =

The 2011 African U-17 Championship qualification was a men's under-17 football competition which decided the participating teams of the 2011 African U-17 Championship.

== Preliminary round ==
The first leg matches were played on either the 9th, 10th or 11 April 2010. The second leg matches were played on either the 23rd, 24th or 25 April 2010. The winners advanced to the First Round.

Team 1	Agg.	Team 2	1st leg	2nd leg
Comoros	2 - 8	Réunion	1 - 3	1 - 5
Namibia	0 - 5	South Africa	0 - 3	0 - 2
Somalia	3 - 1	Kenya	3 - 1	0 - 0
Chad	2 - 2 (a)	Gabon	2 - 1	0 - 1
Congo	4 - 0	Equatorial Guinea	1 - 0	3 - 0
Uganda	3 - 1 d	Zambia	2 - 0	1 - 1
Liberia	1 - 2	Senegal	1 - 1	0 - 1
Lesotho	5 - 1	Mozambique	3 - 1	2 - 0
Ethiopia	1 - 2	DR Congo	1 - 1	0 - 1
Mauritius	w/o	Madagascar	-	-
Tanzania	w/o	Sudan	-	-
Morocco	w/o	Guinea-Bissau	-	-

== First round ==
The first leg matches were played on either the 27th, 28th and 29 August 2010, except for the Somalia vs Egypt match, who was played in Egypt on 6 September. The second leg matches were played on either the 10th, 11th and 12 September 2010. The winners advanced to the Second Round.

Team 1	Agg.	Team 2	1st leg	2nd leg
Réunion	5 - 2	Angola	3 - 0	2 - 2
South Africa	4 - 4 (a)	Burkina Faso	4 - 2	0 - 2
Somalia	2 - 7	Egypt	0 - 3	2 - 4
Gabon	2 - 1	Algeria	2 - 1	0 - 0
Congo	3 - 1	Nigeria	2 - 0	1 - 1
Zambia	2 - 3	Ghana	2 - 1	0 - 2
Senegal	4 - 4 (a)	Guinea	3 - 0	1 - 4
Sudan	3 - 6	Tunisia	1 - 2	2 - 4
Morocco	2 - 3	Gambia	1 - 0	1 - 3
Lesotho	2 - 7	Cameroon	0 - 3	2 - 4
DR Congo	1 - 6	Mali	1 - 4	0 - 2
Benin	1 - 1 (a)	Ivory Coast	1 - 1	0 - 0
Mauritius	w/o	Zimbabwe	-	-
Togo	w/o	Sierra Leone	-	-

== Second round ==
The first leg matches were played on either the 6th or 7 November 2010. The second leg matches were played on either the 20th or 21 November 2010, except for the Burkina Faso vs Reunion match, who was played on 26 November. The winners advanced to the Finals.

Team 1	Agg.	Team 2	1st leg	2nd leg
Réunion	1 - 3	Burkina Faso	1 - 0	0 - 3
Gabon	2 - 2 (p 2 – 3)	Congo	2 - 0	0 - 2
Ghana	2 - 2 (p 4 – 5)	Senegal	2 - 0	0 - 2
Tunisia	3 - 3 (a)	Gambia	3 - 2	0 - 1
Cameroon	0 - 4	Mali	0 - 1	0 - 3
Sierra Leone	2 - 4	Ivory Coast	2 - 2	0 - 2
Mauritius	w/o	Egypt	-	-

== Qualified teams ==
- Burkina Faso
- Congo
- Ivory Coast
- Egypt
- Gambia
- Mali
- Rwanda (host nation)
- Senegal
