= 2013 African U-17 Championship qualification =

The 2013 African U-17 Championship qualification was a men's under-17 football competition which decided the participating teams of the 2013 African U-17 Championship.

== Preliminary round ==
The first leg matches were played on either 7, 8 or 9 September 2012. The second leg matches were played on either 21, 22 or 23 September 2012. The winners advanced to the First Round.

Team 1	Agg.	Team 2	1st leg	2nd leg
Malawi	3 - 3 (p 2 – 4)	Botswana	2 - 1	1 - 2
Zimbabwe	4 - 2	Mozambique	2 - 2	2 - 0
Niger	1 - 10	Nigeria	1 - 4	0 - 6
Libya	4 - 6	Mauritania	2 - 5	2 - 1
Somalia	0 - 3	Sudan	0 - 3	
Réunion	w/o	Namibia	-	-
Ethiopia	w/o	Central African Republic	-	-
Chad	w/o	Equatorial Guinea	-	-
Tanzania	w/o	Kenya	-	-
DR Congo	w/o	Angola	-	-
Liberia	w/o	Benin	-	-

== First round ==
The first leg matches were played on either 12, 13 or 14 October 2012. The second leg matches were played on either 26, 27 or 28 October 2012, except for the Congo vs Zimbabwe match, which was played on 6 November. The winners advanced to the Second Round.

Team 1	Agg.	Team 2	1st leg	2nd leg
Namibia	0 - 7	Burkina Faso	0 - 2	0 - 5
Ethiopia	4 - 5	Tunisia	3 - 0	1 - 5
Botswana	1 - 1 (p 7 – 6)	Rwanda	1 - 0	0 - 1
Angola	4 - 5	Gabon	4 - 1	0 - 4
Benin	5 - 2	Cameroon	4 - 1	1 - 1
South Africa	2 - 1	Zambia	1 - 1	1 - 0
Mauritania	3 - 6	Mali	2 - 1	1 - 5
Nigeria	7 - 0	Guinea	3 - 0	4 - 0
Zimbabwe	w/o	Congo	1 - 2	w/o
Sudan	w/o	Algeria	-	-
Sierra Leone	w/o	Senegal	-	-
Chad	w/o	Ivory Coast	-	-
Tanzania	w/o	Egypt	-	-
Gambia	w/o	Ghana	-	-

== Second round ==
The first leg matches were played on either 16, 17 or 18 November 2012. The second leg matches were played on either 31 November, 1 or 2 December 2012. The winners advanced to the Finals.

Team 1	Agg.	Team 2	1st leg	2nd leg
Botswana	2 - 2 (p 3 – 2)	Algeria	1 - 1	1 - 1
Burkina Faso	2 - 4	Tunisia	2 - 1	0 - 3
Senegal	2 - 3	Ivory Coast	1 - 1	1 - 2
Tanzania	1 - 2	Congo	1 - 0	0 - 2
Gabon	3 - 2	Benin	2 - 1	1 - 1
South Africa	3 - 5	Ghana	2 - 3	1 - 2
Nigeria	4 - 0	Mali	2 - 0	2 - 0

16 November 2012
16:00

Botswana	1 – 1	Algeria
Ramatlapeng 65'	Report	75' Sebaïhia

Molepolole Stadium, Molepolole
Referee: Reinhold Shikongo (Namibia)
2 December 2012

Algeria	1 – 1	Botswana
Benbahria 18'		68' Nbodol
Penalties
	2 – 4

Stade Omar Hamadi, Algiers
Referee: Youssef Essrayri (Tunisia)

17 November 2012
16:00

Burkina Faso	2 – 1	Tunisia
Davou 45' (pen.); Ouattara 76'	Report	20' Hassen

Stade du 4-Août, Ouagadougou
Referee: Reginald Lathbridge (Ghana)
1 December 2012

Tunisia	3 – 0	Burkina Faso
Hassen 2', 25'; Jebali 52'

Stade Olympique de Sousse, Sousse
Referee: Mounir Mabrouk (Morocco)

17 November 2012

Senegal	1 – 1	Ivory Coast
Faye 68'	Report	53' Kouassi

Stade Leopold Senghor, Dakar
Referee: Mehdi Abid-Charef (Algeria)
1 December 2012

Ivory Coast	2 – 1	Senegal
... 45'... 80'		60' ...

Stade Robert-Champroux, Abidjan
Referee: Kokou Fagla (Togo)

18 November 2012

Tanzania	1 – 0	Congo
Abbas 15'	Report

Benjamin Mkapa National Stadium, Dar es Salaam
Referee: Brian Miiro (Uganda)
1 December 2012

Congo	2 – 0	Tanzania
Benguela 29' (pen.); Bakaki 52'

Stade Massamba Débat, Brazzaville
Referee: Omphile Phuthego (Botswana)

17 November 2012

Gabon	2 – 1	Benin
Autchanga 5'; Ongaye 20'	Report	80' Quenum

Stade Augustin Monédan de Sibang, Libreville
Referee: Mandeng Cosmas Jerome (Cameroon)
2 December 2012

Benin	1 – 1	Gabon
... 73' (pen.)		45' Elekana

Stade Charles de Gaulle, Porto-Novo
Referee: Henry Ogunyamodi (Nigeria)

17 November 2012

South Africa	2 – 3	Ghana
Nel 64'; Ngcobo 90'	Report	32', 81' Asare; 34' Atanga

Sinaba Stadium, Benoni
Referee: Dennis Nguluwe (Malawi)
1 December 2012

Ghana	2 – 1	South Africa
Emmanuel Boateng 17'; Essigba 21'	Source	80' Ntuli

Essipong Stadium, Sekondi
Referee: Namouano Souleymane (Niger)

18 November 2012

Nigeria	2 – 0	Mali
Ndidi 23'; Ibrahim 82'	Report

U. J. Esuene Stadium, Calabar
Referee: Kouamé N'Dri (Ivory Coast)
2 December 2012

Mali	0 – 2	Nigeria
		39' Success; 79' Benneth

Stade Mamadou Konaté, Bamako
Referee: Sekou Ahmed Toure (Guinea)

== Qualified teams ==
- Botswana
- Congo
- Ivory Coast
- Gabon
- Ghana
- Morocco (host nation)
- Nigeria
- Tunisia
