= 2009 African U-17 Championship qualification =

The 2009 African U-17 Championship qualification was a men's under-17 football competition which decided the participating teams of the 2009 African U-17 Championship.

== Preliminary round ==
The first leg matches were played on either 11, 12, 13 or 15 August 2008. The second leg matches were played on either 25 or 26 August 2008. The winners advanced to the First Round.

Team 1	Agg.	Team 2	1st leg	2nd leg
Mauritania	0 - 2	Guinea-Bissau	0 - 1	0 - 1
Lesotho	1 - 9	Namibia	0 - 5	1 - 4
Réunion	7 - 0	Seychelles	4 - 0	3 - 0
Malawi	5 - 0	Mozambique	4 - 0	1 - 0
Rwanda	4 - 3	Kenya	2 - 2	2 - 1
Somalia	w/o	Niger	0 - 3	w/o
Sierra Leone	w/o	Liberia	-	-
Tanzania	w/o	DR Congo	-	-

== First round ==
The first leg matches were played on either 29, 30 and 31 August, except for the Zambia vs Namibia match, which was played on 6 September. The second leg matches were played on 12, 13 or 14 September 2008. The Angola vs Botswana matches were played on 14 September (first leg), and 26 September (second leg). The winners advanced to the Second Round.

Team 1	Agg.	Team 2	1st leg	2nd leg
Zimbabwe	2 - 1	Réunion	2 - 0	0 - 1
Ghana	5 - 1	Libya	3 - 0	2 - 1
Tunisia	1 - 3	Burkina Faso	0 - 0	1 - 3
South Africa	1 - 3	Malawi	0 - 1	1 - 2
Mali	1 - 2	Niger	1 - 0	0 - 2
Nigeria	2 - 3	Benin	2 - 0	0 - 3
Cameroon	2 - 1	Gabon	2 - 0	0 - 1
Gambia	7 - 1	Sierra Leone	4 - 1	3 - 0
Sudan	1 - 6	Rwanda	1 - 2	0 - 4
Guinea	3 - 3 (p 3 – 2)	Guinea-Bissau	2 - 1	1 - 2
Zambia	0 - 0 (p 2 – 4)	Namibia	0 - 0	0 - 0
Angola	4 - 1	Botswana	2 - 0	2 - 1
Ivory Coast	w/o	Senegal	-	-
Eritrea	w/o	DR Congo	-	-

== Second round ==
The first leg matches were played on 8 and 9 November. The second leg matches were played on 22 and 23 November. The winners qualified for the Finals.

Team 1	Agg.	Team 2	1st leg	2nd leg
Burkina Faso	3 - 2	Rwanda	2 - 1	1 - 1
Angola	2 - 4	Zimbabwe	2 - 3	0 - 1
Namibia	3 - 8	Malawi	2 - 1	1 - 7
Ivory Coast	2 - 2 (a)	Niger	2 - 1	0 - 1
Ghana	3 - 3 (a)	Gambia	3 - 1	0 - 2
Guinea	1 - 1 (p 4 – 3)	Benin	1 - 0	0 - 1
Eritrea	0 - 5	Cameroon	0 - 2	0 - 3

== Qualified teams ==
- Algeria (host nation)
- Burkina Faso
- Cameroon
- Gambia
- Guinea
- Malawi
- Niger
- Zimbabwe
