= Femi Salami =

Beninese footballer (born 2000)

Personal information
- Date of birth: 22 January 2000 (age 26)
- Place of birth: Tours, France
- Height: 1.81 m (5 ft 11 in)
- Position: Forward

Team information
- Current team: Marignane GCB B
- Number: 22

Youth career
- 2016: Tours FC
- 2017: Balma SC
- 2019: Saint Cyr EB

Senior career*
Years	Team	Apps	(Gls)
2021	AS Géménos	15	(7)
2021	Tours	20	(11)
2022	Marseille Endoume	7	(3)
2022	Marignane GCB B	22	(12)

International career^{‡}
2016	Benin U17	2	(0)
2018	Benin U20	3	(1)
- * Club domestic league appearances and goals as of 15 December 2023 ‡ National team caps and goals as of 1 June 2018

Femi Salami (born 22 January 2000) is a professional footballer who plays as forward for French club Marignane GCB Team B side. Born in France, he has represented Benin at youth level.

== Club career ==
Femi began his European career at Tours FC, Balma SC and Saint Cyr EB. In summer window of 2021 he signed a half year deal with Marseille-based club AS Géménos. With just a season at AS Gemenos, he left and signed with French club Tours FC. In the summer of 2022, he left Tours FC and joined Marseille Endoume. After two seasons at Endoume, he moved to French club Marignane GCB for two seasons but was sent to Team B due to first team registration delays.

== International career ==
Born in France, Salami was born to a Beninese father and mother. He has previously been called up by Benin U17 and Benin U20 . He represented the Benin U17 in a friendly against Ivory Coast in August 2016.Salami debuted for the and Benin U20in a friendly against The Gambia in April 2018.
