= Ally Msengi =

Tanzanian footballer

Personal information
- Full name: Ally Hussein Msengi
- Date of birth: 20 December 2001 (age 24)
- Place of birth: Dodoma, Tanzania
- Position: Midfielder

Team information
- Current team: Moroka Swallows

Youth career
- KMC

Senior career*
Years	Team	Apps	(Gls)
2018–2020	KMC		
2020–2022	Stellenbosch	28	(0)
2022–	Moroka Swallows		

International career
- Tanzania U15
2016–2017	Tanzania U17		
2018–2019	Tanzania U20		
2018	Tanzania U23		
2020–	Tanzania	1	(0)
- * Club domestic league appearances and goals as of 1 December 2020

Ally Hussein Msengi (born 20 December 2001) is a Tanzanian professional footballer who plays as a midfielder for South African Premier Division club Moroka Swallows and the Tanzania national team.

== Club career ==
Msengi played one-and-a-half seasons with local club KMC in the top-flight league in Tanzania. In January 2020 he signed a three-year deal with South African Premier Division club Stellenbosch.

== International career ==
Msengi represented Tanzania at all youth levels from under-15 to under-23. Tournaments include the 2016 U-16 AIFF Youth Cup, the 2017 Africa U-17 Cup of Nations (and its qualification) and the 2019 CECAFA U-20 Championship.

He made his senior international debut on 11 October 2020, coming on for Mbwana Samatta during a 1–0 friendly defeat to Burundi.

== Honours ==
=== International ===
Tanzania U20

- CECAFA U-20 Championship: 2019
