= Aaron Ibilola =

Beninese footballer

Personal information
- Date of birth: 10 December 1997 (age 28)
- Place of birth: Benin
- Height: 1.66 m (5 ft 5 in)
- Positions: Midfielder; forward

Youth career
- Tonnerre d'Abomey
- Chicago Magic PSG

Senior career*
Years	Team	Apps	(Gls)
2017	Brasilis		(5)
2018–2019	Ponte Preta	3	(0)
2019	Francana		

International career
2014	Benin U17		
- Benin U20
- * Club domestic league appearances and goals

Aaron Ibilola (born 10 December 1997) is a Beninese footballer who plays as a midfielder or forward.

== Club career ==
Ibilola spent part of his youth career with Benin's Tonnerre d'Abomey and in the United States with Chicago Magic PSG. He began his senior career with Brasilis in 2017, before joining Ponte Preta a year later. He made his debut in a Copa do Brasil tie against Internacional on 21 February 2018, prior to making his first Campeonato Paulista appearance during a home loss versus Bragantino in March. Five appearances later, Ibilola scored his first goal in a 3–1 defeat away to São Bento. In February 2019, Ibilola moved to Campeonato Paulista Segunda Divisão side Francana.

In early 2020, Ibilola had a trial with Polish III liga side Hutnik Kraków. He featured in a friendly with Stal Rzeszów.

== International career ==
Ibilola represented Benin at U17 level. In April 2014, he scored three goals as Benin won the 2014 WAFU ‘B’ U-17 Championship held in Togo. Three months later, in July 2014, Ibilola scored in a 1–0 victory over Mali in 2015 African U-17 Championship qualifying. However, the result was later revoked after Benin featured four ineligible players, including Ibilola, in the match. He also received call-ups to the Benin U20s.

== Career statistics ==
As of 4 August 2018.

Club statistics
Club	Season	League			Cup		League Cup		Continental		Other		Total	
Club	Season	Division	Apps	Goals	Apps	Goals	Apps	Goals	Apps	Goals	Apps	Goals	Apps	Goals
Ponte Preta	2018	Série B	3	0	5	0	—		—		6 (Note: Appearance(s) in the Campeonato Paulista)	1	14	1
Career total			3	0	5	0	—		—		6	1	14	1

== Honours ==
Benin U17

- WAFU ‘B’ U-17 Championship: 2014
