= Yamirou Ouorou =

Beninese footballer (born 2006)

Personal information
- Date of birth: 12 June 2006 (age 20)
- Place of birth: Sèmè-Kpodji, Benin
- Height: 1.74 m (5 ft 9 in)
- Position: Winger

Team information
- Current team: AC Horsens
- Number: 27

Youth career
- USS Kraké

Senior career*
Years	Team	Apps	(Gls)
2024–	AC Horsens	35	(1)

International career^{‡}
2021–2023	Benin U17	5	(3)
2026–	Benin	1	(0)
- * Club domestic league appearances and goals as of 14:21, 27 July 2026 (UTC) ‡ National team caps and goals as of 22:30, 6 June 2026 (UTC)

Yamirou Ouorou (born 12 June 2006) is a Beninese professional footballer who plays as a winger for Danish Superliga club AC Horsens and the Benin national team.

== Club career ==
Ouorou came through the academy of USS Kraké in Sèmè-Kpodji, Benin, where he served as captain of the Benin U17 and was named best player at the first edition of the Trophées des Académies de Ligue 1 Uber Eats. He also attracted attention at a young age internationally, winning the Most Assists and Top Player awards at the 2018 Football for Friendship tournament.

In July 2024, Ouorou signed a four-year contract with Danish Danish 1st Division club AC Horsens, joining alongside fellow USS Kraké academy product Abdoul Faridou Arouna in a notable double signing for the Beninese club. He progressed rapidly through the club's youth ranks, representing the U19, U21, and U23 sides before being integrated into the professional group from January 2025. He made his first-team debut in the Danish 1st Division on 14 March 2025, coming on as a substitute in the final match of the regular season as Horsens secured a place in the promotion play-offs.

== International career ==
Ouorou received his first senior call-up to the Benin national football team for the June 2026 FIFA window, one of four uncapped players selected by coach Gernot Rohr as he refreshed his squad ahead of the 2027 AFCON qualifiers. He made his senior debut on 5 June 2026, appearing as a substitute in a 1–1 international friendly draw against Niger in Casablanca, Morocco.
