= Henry Medarious =

Ghanaian association football player

Personal information
- Date of birth: 20 September 1998 (age 28)
- Place of birth: Accra, Ghana
- Height: 1.72 m (5 ft 8 in)
- Position: Forward

Team information
- Current team: Vitória Guimarães B
- Number: 14

Youth career
- Lazio Madina FC
- Platini FC

Senior career*
Years	Team	Apps	(Gls)
2015–2017	Sporting Covilhã	42	(4)
2017–	Vitória Guimarães B	17	(1)
2018	→ Leixões (loan)	7	(1)
- * Club domestic league appearances and goals as of 00:02, 29 August 2019 (UTC)

Henry Medarious (born 20 September 1998) is a Ghanaian professional footballer who plays for Vitória Guimarães B, as a forward.

== Career ==
On 12 September 2015, Medarious made his professional debut with Sporting Covilhã in a 2015–16 Segunda Liga match against Farense.
