= Namibia national under-17 football team =

Namibia U-17
- Nickname: Namibia Warriors
- Association: Namibia Football Association (NFA)
- Confederation: CAF (Africa)
- Sub-confederation: COSAFA (Southern Africa)
- Head coach: Nicholas Woody Jacobs
- Home stadium: Independence Stadium
First colours	Second colours

U-17 Africa Cup of Nations
- Appearances: None

FIFA U-17 World Cup
- Appearances: None

The Namibia national under-17 football team, nicknamed the Small Leopards, represents Namibia in international youth football competitions. Its primary role is the development of players in preparation for the senior national team. The team competes in a variety of competitions, including the biennial FIFA U-17 World Cup and the U-17 Africa Cup of Nations, which is the top competitions for this age group.

== Competitive record ==
=== FIFA U-16 and U-17 World Cup record ===
FIFA U-16 and U-17 World Cup
Year	Round	GP	W	D^{1}	L	GS	GA
(China) 1985	Did not enter						
(Canada) 1987	Did not enter						
(Scotland) 1989	Did not enter						
(Italy) 1991	Did not enter						
(Japan) 1993	Did not enter						
(Ecuador) 1995	Did not enter						
(Egypt) 1997	Did not enter						
(New Zealand) 1999	Did not qualify						
(Trinidad and Tobago) 2001	Did not qualify						
(Finland) 2003	Did not qualify						
(Peru) 2005	Did not qualify						
(South Korea) 2007	Withdrew						
(Nigeria) 2009	Did not qualify						
(Mexico) 2011	Did not qualify						
(United Arab Emirates) 2013	Did not qualify						
(Chile) 2015	Did not qualify						
(India) 2017	Did not qualify						
(Brazil) 2019	Did not qualify						
(Indonesia) 2023	Did not qualify						
(Qatar) 2025	Did not qualify						
(Qatar) 2026	Did not enter						
Total	0/20	0	0	0	0	0	0

=== U-17 Africa Cup of Nations record ===
U-17 Africa Cup of Nations								U-17 Africa Cup of Nations qualification record						
Year	Round	GP	W	D^{1}	L	GS	GA							
(Mali) 1995	Did not enter													
(Botswana) 1997	Did not enter													
(Guinea) 1999	Did not qualify							2	0	1	1	1	4	-3
(Seychelles) 2001	Did not qualify							2	1	0	1	2	7	-5
(Eswatini) 2003	Did not qualify							2	0	1	1	0	3	-3
(The Gambia) 2005	Did not qualify							2	0	1	1	1	2	-1
(Togo) 2007	Withdrew													
(Algeria) 2009	Did not qualify							6	3	2	1	12	9	+3
(Rwanda) 2011	Did not qualify							2	0	0	2	0	5	-5
(Morocco) 2013	Did not qualify							2	0	0	2	0	7	-7
(Niger) 2015	Did not qualify							2	0	1	1	1	2	-1
(Gabon) 2017	Did not qualify							4	1	0	3	3	7	-4
(Tanzania) 2019	Did not qualify							5	3	0	2	12	12	0
(Algeria) 2023	Did not qualify							2	0	0	2	1	3	-2
Total	0/14							31	8	6	17	33	61	-28

*Draws include knockout matches decided on penalty kicks.

== See also ==
- Namibia national football team
- Namibia national under-20 football team
