= Angola national under-17 football team =

Angola U-17
- Nickname: Palanquinhas
- Association: Federação Angolana de Futebol
- Confederation: CAF (Africa)
- Head coach: (Angola) Mario Catala
- Captain: Gelson Dala
- Top scorer: Capitá and Pedro António (8 goals)
- Home stadium: Estádio dos Coqueiros
- FIFA code: ANG
First colours	Second colours

U-17 Africa Cup of Nations
- Appearances: 5 (first in 1997)
- Best result: Third place (2019)

FIFA U-17 World Cup
- Appearances: 1 (first in 2019)
- Best result: Round of 16 (2019)

The Angola national under-17 football team is the national under-17 football team of Angola and is controlled by the Federação Angolana de Futebol. The team competes in the U-17 Africa Cup of Nations and the FIFA U-17 World Cup, which is held every two years.

== Honours ==
- Africa U-17 Cup of Nations:
  - Winners (0):

== Tournament Records ==
=== FIFA U-17 World Cup ===
Year	Round	Position	GP	W	D	L	GS	GA	GD
(China) 1985	did not enter								
(Canada) 1987	did not enter								
(Scotland) 1989	Withdrew								
(Italy) 1991	did not enter								
(Japan) 1993	did not enter								
(Ecuador) 1995	did not qualify								
(Egypt) 1997	did not qualify								
(New Zealand) 1999	did not qualify								
(Trinidad and Tobago) 2001	did not qualify								
(Finland) 2003	did not qualify								
(Peru) 2005	did not qualify								
(South Korea) 2007	did not qualify								
(Nigeria) 2009	did not qualify								
(Mexico) 2011	did not qualify								
(United Arab Emirates) 2013	did not qualify								
(Chile) 2015	did not qualify								
(India) 2017	did not qualify								
(Brazil) 2019	Round of 16	13th	4	2	0	2	4	5	-1
(Indonesia) 2023	did not qualify								
(Qatar) 2025	did not qualify								
Total	1/20		4	2	0	2	4	5	-1

=== CAF U-16 and U-17 World Cup Qualifiers record ===
CAF U-16 and U-17 World Cup Qualifiers
Appearances: 0 / 5
Year	Round	Position	Pld	W	D	L	GF	GA	GD
1985	did not enter								
1987	did not enter								
1989	Withdrew								
1991	did not enter								
1993	did not enter								
Total	-	-							

=== Africa U-17 Cup of Nations record ===
Africa U-17 Cup of Nations qualification record							Africa U-17 Cup of Nations								
Appearances: 5 / 15
GP	W	D	L	GS	GA	GD	Year	Round	GP	W	D	L	GS	GA	GD
2	0	0	2	1	5	-4	(Mali) 1995	did not qualify							
3	2	1	0	5	1	+4	(Botswana) 1997	Group stage	3	1	1	1	7	6	+1
4	2	2	0	5	2	+3	(Guinea) 1999	Group stage	3	1	0	2	2	5	-3
2	0	1	1	2	3	-1	(Seychelles) 2001	did not qualify							
4	3	0	1	14	5	+9	(Eswatini) 2003	did not qualify							
2	0	0	2	1	6	-5	(The Gambia) 2005	did not qualify							
2	0	1	1	1	5	-4	(Togo) 2007	did not qualify							
4	2	0	2	6	5	+1	(Algeria) 2009	did not qualify							
2	0	1	1	2	5	-3	(Rwanda) 2011	did not qualify							
2	1	0	1	4	5	-1	(Morocco) 2013	did not qualify							
4	1	1	2	4	6	-2	(Niger) 2015	did not qualify							
4	4	0	0	11	0	+11	(Gabon) 2017	Group stage	3	0	1	2	4	10	-6
5	5	0	0	15	1	+14	(Tanzania) 2019	Third place	5	3	0	2	7	5	12
-	-	-	-	-	-	-	(Algeria) 2023	Withdrew							
5	3	1	1	7	4	+3	(Morocco) 2025	Group stage	3	1	1	1	7	3	4
5	4	0	1	19	3	+16	(Morocco) 2026	Group stage	3	0	1	2	1	5	-4
50	27	8	15	97	57	+40	Total		17	7	8	19	14	26	-12

== Current squad ==
The following players were called up to the squad for the 2026 U-17 Africa Cup of Nations.

No.	Pos.	Player	Date of birth (age)	Club
12	GK	Gelson Dala	22 September 2009 (age 17)	(Angolan Football Federation) Petróleos de Luanda
22	GK	Luis Alberto	22 July 2008 (age 18)	(Portuguese Football Federation) Vitória Setúbal FC
2	DF	Lourenço	28 June 2008 (age 18)	(Angolan Football Federation) Petróleos de Luanda
4	DF	Ivan Manuel	16 October 2008 (age 17)	(Angolan Football Federation) Nacional de Benguela
5	DF	Galinha	4 September 2008 (age 18)	(Angolan Football Federation) Petróleos de Luanda
15	DF	Josemar	26 November 2008 (age 17)	(Angolan Football Federation) Petróleos de Luanda
23	DF	Ginima	8 October 2010 (age 15)	(Angolan Football Federation) Primeiro de Agosto
3	DF	Marcos Raimundo	19 June 2008 (age 18)	(Angolan Football Federation) A.F.A.
6	MF	Luwawu	10 July 2008 (age 18)	(Angolan Football Federation) A.F.A.
8	MF	Manelson	23 June 2009 (age 17)	(Angolan Football Federation) A.F.A.
14	MF	Jairo Muanha	15 March 2009 (age 17)	(Angolan Football Federation) Petróleos de Luanda
13	FW	Luís Rasgado	14 May 2008 (age 18)	(Portuguese Football Federation) Rio Ave
7	FW	Edilásio	22 October 2009 (age 16)	(Angolan Football Federation) Petróleos de Luanda
9	FW	Hugo Luvumbo	28 October 2009 (age 16)	(Angolan Football Federation) Interclub
17	FW	Kalanguinha	11 July 2009 (age 17)	(Angolan Football Federation) Petróleos de Luanda
18	FW	Eliseu Francisco	7 February 2009 (age 17)	(Angolan Football Federation) Primeiro de Agosto

== Head-to-head record ==
The following table shows Angola's head-to-head record in the FIFA U-17 World Cup.

Opponent	Pld	W	D	L	GF	GA	GD	Win %
Brazil	1	0	0	1	0	2	−2	0.00
Canada	1	1	0	0	2	1	+1	100.00
New Zealand	1	1	0	0	2	1	+1	100.00
South Korea	1	0	0	1	0	1	−1	0.00
Total	4	2	0	2	4	5	−1	50.00

=== Top goalscorers ===
Rank	Player	Goals	Caps	Ratio	Career
1	Pedro António	8	8	1	2025–
2	Capitá	8	9	0.89	2019

== See also ==
- Angola national under-20 football team
- Angola national football team
- Angolan Football Federation
