= Stade Municipal (Lomé) =

Stadium in Lomé, Togo

Stade Municipal is a multi-use stadium in Lomé, Togo. It is currently used mostly for football matches.
