= Congo national under-17 football team =

Congo U-17
- Nickname(s): Les Diables Rouges (The Red Devils)
- Association: Fédération Congolaise de Football (FECOFOOT)
- Confederation: CAF (Africa)
- Sub-confederation: UNIFFAC (Central Africa)
- Home stadium: Stade Municipal de Kintélé; Stade Alphonse Massemba-Débat
- FIFA code: CGO
First colours	Second colours

U-17 Africa Cup of Nations
- Appearances: 3 (first in 2011)
- Best result: Third place (2011)

FIFA U-17 World Cup
- Appearances: 3 (first in 1985)
- Best result: Round of 16 (2011)

The Congo national under-17 football team is the national U-17 football team of the Republic of the Congo and is run by the Fédération Congolaise de Football. The team competes in the UNIFFAC Cup, Africa U-17 Cup of Nations and FIFA U-17 World Cup.

== Current squad ==
The following players were named in the squad for the 2023 U-17 Africa Cup of Nations between 29 April – 19 May.

Caps and goals are correct as of 2 May 2023, after the match against Somalia.

No.	Pos.	Player	Date of birth (age)	Caps	Goals	Club
1	GK	Chelcy Bonazebi	18 May 2006 (age 19)	2	0	(Congolese Football Federation) CARA Brazzaville
16	GK	Ghys-Exauce Tchiamas	8 July 2006 (age 19)	0	0	(French Football Federation) Quevilly-Rouen Métropole
2	DF	Baudleck Nganda	8 January 2006 (age 20)	1	0	(Congolese Football Federation) Otohô
4	DF	Brad-Hamilton Mantsounga	6 September 2007 (age 18)	2	0	(French Football Federation) Nice
5	DF	Axel Lebo	30 April 2006 (age 19)	1	0	(Congolese Football Federation) Avenir
6	DF	Christian Mafoulou	20 June 2006 (age 19)	1	0	(Congolese Football Federation) CARA Brazzaville
13	DF	Aaron Maniongui	20 March 2006 (age 19)	2	0	(French Football Federation) Saint-Jean-de-la-Ruelle
17	DF	Noa Kayi	22 June 2008 (age 17)	1	0	(French Football Federation) Orléans
20	DF	Brayan Kenge	1 July 2007 (age 18)	1	0	(French Football Federation) Argenteuil
8	MF	Digne Pounga	15 May 2006 (age 19)	2	0	(Congolese Football Federation) Avenir
10	MF	Abiga Tsimba	26 December 2007 (age 18)	2	0	(Congolese Football Federation) Racing Club Brazzaville
19	MF	Randy Baleka	22 January 2006 (age 20)	2	0	(French Football Federation) FC Lyon
24	MF	Dieuveil Ngazania	23 March 2006 (age 19)	1	0	(Congolese Football Federation) Sirina
25	MF	Lucas Mbouyou	5 February 2007 (age 19)	1	0	(French Football Federation) Tours
7	FW	Geltany Bantsiele	30 October 2006 (age 19)	1	0	(Congolese Football Federation) Sirina
9	FW	Alexandre Boukoulou	25 August 2006 (age 19)	2	0	(French Football Federation) Clermont Foot
11	FW	Joseph Ndzoukou	28 July 2006 (age 19)	1	0	(Congolese Football Federation) Avenir
12	FW	Mignon Olyba	12 January 2006 (age 20)	1	0	(Congolese Football Federation) JS de Talangai
14	FW	Beny Moukila	21 June 2007 (age 18)	1	0	(French Football Federation) Nice
15	FW	Bienvenu Bizenga	13 August 2006 (age 19)	1	0	(Congolese Football Federation) Avenir
18	FW	Ayel Wumba Nzouzi	26 December 2007 (age 18)	2	1	(Congolese Football Federation) Capaco Beni
21	FW	Jason Bemba	31 March 2006 (age 19)	1	0	(French Football Federation) Sochaux
22	FW	Gloire Nzebele	24 August 2007 (age 18)	2	0	(Congolese Football Federation) Avenir

== Competitive record ==
=== FIFA U-17 World Cup record ===
FIFA U-17 World Cup record
Year	Round	Position	GP	W	D*	L	GS	GA
(China) 1985	Group stage	14th	3	0	0	3	4	10
(Canada) 1987	Did Not Enter							
(Scotland) 1989	Did Not Enter							
(Italy) 1991	Group stage	9th	3	1	1	1	2	3
(Japan) 1993	Did Not Enter							
(Ecuador) 1995	Withdrew							
(Egypt) 1997	Did Not Enter							
(New Zealand) 1999	Withdrew							
(Trinidad and Tobago) 2001	Withdrew							
(Finland) 2003	Did Not Enter							
(Peru) 2005	Did not qualify							
(South Korea) 2007	Withdrew							
(Nigeria) 2009	Did Not Enter							
(Mexico) 2011	Round of 16	11th	4	1	1	2	4	5
(United Arab Emirates) 2013	Did not qualify							
(Chile) 2015	Did not qualify							
(India) 2017	Disqualified							
(Brazil) 2019	Did not qualify							
(Indonesia) 2023	Did not qualify							
(Qatar) 2025	Disqualified							
(Qatar) 2026	Withdrew							
Total	3/21	Round of 16	10	2	2	6	10	18

=== U-17 Africa Cup of Nations record ===
U-17 Africa Cup of Nations
Year	Round	Position	GP	W	D*	L	GS	GA
(Mali) 1995	Withdrew							
(Botswana) 1997	Did not enter							
(Guinea) 1999	Withdrew							
(Seychelles) 2001	Withdrew							
(Eswatini) 2003	Did not enter							
(The Gambia) 2005	Did not qualify							
(Togo) 2007	Withdrew							
(Algeria) 2009	Did not enter							
(Rwanda) 2011	Third Place	3rd	5	3	2	0	10	5
(Morocco) 2013	Group stage	7th	3	0	2	1	2	9
(Niger) 2015	Did not qualify							
(Gabon) 2017	Disqualified							
(Tanzania) 2019	Did not qualify							
(Algeria) 2023	Quarter-finals	-	4	0	2	2	2	6
(Morocco) 2025	Disqualified							
(Morocco) 2026	Withdrew							
Total	3/16	Third Place	12	3	6	3	14	20

=== CAF U-16 and U-17 World Cup Qualifiers record ===
CAF U-16 and U-17 World Cup Qualifiers
Appearances: 2
Year	Round	Position	Pld	W	D	L	GF	GA
1985	Second Round	-	2	1	0	1	2	2
1987	Did not enter							
1989	Did not enter							
1991	Fourth round	-	4	2	1	1	10	2
1993	Did not enter							
Total	2/5	Fourth round	6	3	1	2	12	4

*Draws include knockout matches decided on penalty kicks.
