= Ivory Coast national under-17 football team =

National under-17 association football team representing Ivory Coast

Ivory Coast U-17
- Nickname(s): Les Petits Éléphants (The Little Elephants)
- Association: Ivorian Football Federation
- Confederation: CAF (Africa)
- Sub-confederation: WAFU (West Africa)
- Head coach: Bassiriki Diabaté
- Captain: Jean Thome
- FIFA code: CIV
First colours	Second colours

U-17 Africa Cup of Nations
- Appearances: 6 (first in 1997)
- Best result: Champions (2013)

FIFA U-17 World Cup
- Appearances: 6 (first in 1987)
- Best result: Third Place (1987)

The Ivory Coast national under-17 football team, nicknamed Les petit Éléphants ("The Little Elephants" in French), represents Ivory Coast in international football at the under-17 level and is controlled by the Ivorian Football Federation. The team's first appearance on the world stage was in 1987 at the 1987 FIFA U-16 World Championship in Canada where they achieved third place after a 2-1 extra time victory over Italy in the third-place playoff.

== Current squad ==
The following players were called up for the 2026 U-17 Africa Cup of Nations.

No.	Pos.	Player	Date of birth (age)	Club
1	GK	Christ Kouassi	8 October 2008 (age 18)	(Ivorian Football Federation) Olympique Adiaké
16	GK	Paul Koko	24 December 2008 (age 17)	(Ivorian Football Federation) Zoman FC
21	GK	Aboulaye Cissé	14 November 2008 (age 18)	(Ivorian Football Federation) LYS FC
3	DF	Kouadio Koffi	22 December 2008 (age 17)	(Ivorian Football Federation) Zoman FC
4	DF	Samba Konate	14 October 2008 (age 18)	(Ivorian Football Federation) SOL FC
18	DF	Aboubacar Meite	29 December 2008 (age 17)	(Malian Football Federation) Afrique Élite
5	DF	Kouame Obli	20 December 2008 (age 17)	(Ivorian Football Federation) Mouna
6	MF	Habib Soumahoro	24 December 2008 (age 17)	(Ivorian Football Federation) RC Abidjan
8	MF	Daan Yoboue	1 November 2008 (age 18)	(Ivorian Football Federation) ES Bingerville
10	MF	Ismael Toure	11 May 2008 (age 18)	(Ivorian Football Federation) Mouna
14	MF	Cheick Malo	26 July 2009 (age 17)	(Ivorian Football Federation) FC San Pédro
19	MF	Tape Touali	11 October 2008 (age 18)	(Ivorian Football Federation) SOA FC
7	FW	Bakary Kebe	29 November 2008 (age 17)	(Ivorian Football Federation) Jeunesse d'Angré
9	FW	Alynho Haidara	26 July 2008 (age 18)	(Ivorian Football Federation) FC Mayence 05
11	FW	Allassane Toure	5 November 2009 (age 17)	(Ivorian Football Federation) RC Abidjan
15	FW	Youbah Coulibaly	29 October 2008 (age 18)	(Ivorian Football Federation) Zoman FC
17	FW	Kouassi Kouadio	5 May 2008 (age 18)	(Malian Football Federation) Afrique Élite
20	FW	Hubert Yao	5 November 2009 (age 17)	(Ivorian Football Federation) FC San Pédro

== Honours ==
- Africa U-17 Cup of Nations
  - Champions (1): 2013
  - Third (2): 2005, 2025
- FIFA U-17 World Cup:
  - Third (1): 1987

== Competitive record ==
=== FIFA U-17 World Cup ===
Year	Round	Pld	W	D	L	GS	GA
(China) 1985	Did not enter						
(Canada) 1987	Third Place	6	4	1	1	9	7
(Scotland) 1989	Did not qualify						
(Italy) 1991	Walkover						
(Japan) 1993	Walkover						
(Ecuador) 1995	Did not qualify						
(Egypt) 1997	Did not qualify						
(New Zealand) 1999	Did not qualify						
(Trinidad and Tobago) 2001	Walkover						
(Finland) 2003	Did not qualify						
(Peru) 2005	Group stage	3	0	1	2	4	8
(South Korea) 2007	Did not qualify						
(Nigeria) 2009	Did not qualify						
(Mexico) 2011	Round of 16	4	1	1	2	10	10
(United Arab Emirates) 2013	Quarter-finals	5	2	1	2	7	5
(Chile) 2015	Did not qualify						
(India) 2017	Did not qualify						
(Brazil) 2019	Did not qualify						
(Indonesia) 2023	Did not qualify						
(Qatar) 2025	Group stage	3	0	0	3	2	8
(Qatar) 2026	In progress	1	1	0	0	2	1
(Qatar) 2027	To be determined						
(Qatar) 2028	To be determined						
(Qatar) 2029	To be determined						
Total:6/21	Quarter-finals	22	8	4	10	34	39

=== U-17 Africa Cup of Nations ===
Year	Round	Pld	W	D	L	GF	GA
(Mali) 1995	Did not qualify						
(Botswana) 1997	Group stage	3	1	1	1	7	2
(Guinea) 1999	Did not qualify						
(Seychelles) 2001	Walkover						
(Eswatini) 2003	Did not qualify						
(The Gambia) 2005	Third Place	5	3	0	2	6	5
(Togo) 2007	Did not qualify						
(Algeria) 2009	Did not qualify						
(Rwanda) 2011	Fourth Place	5	2	1	2	9	7
(Morocco) 2013	Champions	5	2	3	0	5	3
(Niger) 2015	Group stage	3	1	1	1	4	4
(Gabon) 2017	Did not qualify						
(Tanzania) 2019	Did not qualify						
(Algeria) 2023	Did not qualify						
(Morocco) 2025	Third Place	6	2	4	0	11	4
Total	6/15	27	11	10	6	42	25

=== CAF U-16 and U-17 World Cup Qualifiers record ===
CAF U-16 and U-17 World Cup Qualifiers
Appearances: 2
Year	Round	Pld	W	D*	L	GF	GA
1985	Did not enter						
1987	Third Round	6	2	2	2	8	6
1989	Third Round	2	0	1	1	1	3
1991	Walkover						
1993	Walkover						
Total	2/5	8	2	3	3	9	9

- Denotes draws include knockout matches decided on penalty kicks.
