= Zambia national under-17 football team =

National youth association football team

Zambia Under-17
- Nickname: Junior Chipolopolo
- Association: FAZ
- Confederation: CAF (Africa)
- Head coach: (Zambia) Chris Kaunda
- Captain: Patson Daka
- FIFA code: ZAM
First colours	Second colours

First international
- Zambia 3–0 Lesotho (Lusaka, Zambia; 1984)

Biggest win
- Zambia 9–0 Mauritius (Lusaka, Zambia; 18 September 1988)

Biggest defeat
- Zambia 0–4 South Africa (Harare, Zimbabwe; 12 September 2025)

U-17 Africa Cup of Nations
- Appearances: 2 (first in 2015)
- Best result: Quarter-final (2025)

COSAFA U-17 Youth Championship
- Appearances: 10 (first in 1994)
- Best result: (gold) Champions (2017), (2019), (2020), and (2024)

FIFA U-17 World Cup
- Appearances: 1 (first in 2025)
- Best result: Round of 32 (2025)

The Zambia national under-17 football team is the youth football team which represents Zambia founded in 1929. The team, nicknamed the Junior Chipolopolo, represents the country in international under-17 matches and is controlled by the Football Association of Zambia. The team's main objectives are to qualify and play at the Africa U-17 Cup of Nations and FIFA U-17 World Cup and develop the players for the main national team Chipolopolo.

== History ==
FIFA U-17 World Cup

They qualified for the maiden FIFA U-17 World Cup in 2025 after advancing to the quarter finals of the 2025 U-17 Africa Cup of Nations.

COSAFA U-17 Cup

In 2016, they were disqualified from the 2016 COSAFA Under-17 Championship because two players were found to have been over the age of 17.

== Competitive record ==
=== FIFA U-17 World Cup ===
Hosts/Year	Round	GP	W	D	L	GS	GA
(China) 1985	Did not qualify						
(Canada) 1987	Withdrew						
(Scotland) 1989	Did not qualify						
(Italy) 1991	Did not qualify						
(Japan) 1993	Did not enter						
(Ecuador) 1995	Disqualified						
(Egypt) 1997	Did not enter						
(New Zealand) 1999	Did not qualify						
(Trinidad and Tobago) 2001	Did not qualify						
(Finland) 2003	Did not qualify						
(Peru) 2005	Did not enter						
(South Korea) 2007	Did not qualify						
(Nigeria) 2009	Did not qualify						
(Mexico) 2011	Did not qualify						
(United Arab Emirates) 2013	Did not qualify						
(Chile) 2015	Did not qualify						
(India) 2017	Did not qualify						
(Brazil) 2019	Did not qualify						
(Indonesia) 2023	Did not qualify						
(Qatar) 2025	Round of 32	4	2	1	1	10	7
(Qatar) 2026	Did not qualify						
Total	1/21	4	2	1	1	10	7

=== African U-17 Championship ===
U-17 Africa Cup of Nations
Hosts/Year	Round	GP	W	D	L	GS	GA
(Mali) 1995	Disqualified						
(Botswana) 1997	Did not enter						
(Guinea) 1999	Did not qualify						
(Seychelles) 2001	Did not qualify						
(Eswatini) 2003	Did not qualify						
(The Gambia) 2005	Did not enter						
(Togo) 2007	Did not qualify						
(Algeria) 2009	Did not qualify						
(Rwanda) 2011	Did not qualify						
(Morocco) 2013	Did not qualify						
(Niger) 2015	Group Stage	3	1	0	2	3	5
(Gabon) 2017	Did not qualify						
(Tanzania) 2019	Did not qualify						
(Morocco) ~~2021~~	Cancelled						
(Algeria) 2023	Group Stage	3	1	0	2	4	5
(Morocco) 2025	qualified						
Total	Runners-up	17	6	4	7	26	30

=== CAF U-16 and U-17 World Cup Qualifiers ===
CAF U-16 and U-17 World Cup Qualifiers
Appearances: 0 / 5
Year	Round	Position	Pld	W	D	L	GF	GA	GD
1985	did not qualify								
1987	Withdrew								
1989	did not qualify								
1991	did not qualify								
1993	did not enter								
Total	-	-							

== Current squad ==
The following players were called up for the 2025 U-17 Africa Cup of Nations.

No.	Pos.	Player	Date of birth (age)	Club
1	GK	William Zulu	8 February 2010 (aged 15)	(Football Association of Zambia) Blaze Sporting Academy
2	DF	George Mwale	20 March 2009 (aged 16)	(Football Association of Zambia) Young Crocs
3	DF	Andrew Mwape	20 August 2008 (aged 16)	(Football Association of Zambia) Young Zanaco
4	FW	Chama Chansa	27 March 2009 (aged 16)	(Football Association of Zambia) Young Zanaco
5	MF	Gabriel Phiri	7 August 2008 (aged 16)	(Football Association of Zambia) Napsa Stars
6	MF	Bongani Ndhlovu	24 October 2008 (aged 16)	(Football Association of Zambia) Young Zanaco
7	FW	Robert Banda	26 May 2008 (aged 16)	(Football Association of Zambia) Athletico Lusaka FC
8	MF	Steven Lungu	22 June 2010 (aged 14)	(Football Association of Zambia) Morkved Sports Club
9	FW	Abel Nyongo	5 September 2008 (aged 16)	(Football Association of Zambia) Athletico Lusaka FC
10	MF	Nthasilwe Malupande	15 November 2009 (aged 15)	(Football Association of Zambia) Young Crocs
11	MF	James Sibeene	25 April 2008 (aged 16)	(Football Association of Zambia) Lusaka Sports Academy
12	DF	Vicent Mutondo	5 February 2008 (aged 17)	(Football Association of Zambia) Central City
13	FW	Daniel Silubonde	16 July 2008 (aged 16)	(Football Association of Zambia) Morkved Sports Club
14	DF	Saviour Mwansa	19 April 2008 (aged 16)	(Football Association of Zambia) Young Crocs
15	MF	Nkotami Chmwemwe	14 February 2008 (aged 17)	(Football Association of Zambia) Mpongwe United
16	GK	Rogers Simumba	1 August 2008 (aged 16)	(Football Association of Zambia) Shamuel Soccer Academy
17	FW	Mapalo Simute	19 March 2009 (aged 16)	(Football Association of Zambia) Mkushi Rising Stars
18	GK	Christo Chitambala	15 September 2009 (aged 15)	(Football Association of Zambia) Eromac FC
19	DF	Billy Daka	31 December 2008 (aged 16)	(Football Association of Zambia) Nkwazi FC
20	DF	Jonathan Kalimina	24 November 2008 (aged 16)	(Football Association of Zambia) Kafue Celtic
21	FW	Mike Mutale	14 May 2008 (aged 16)	(Football Association of Zambia) Makeni All Stars
22	MF	Kelvin Mulenga	1 January 2009 (aged 16)	(Football Association of Zambia) Forest Rangers
23	MF	Joseph Zulu	2 March 2009 (aged 16)	(Football Association of Zambia) Nangweshi Pirates

== Results and fixtures ==
The following is a list of match results in the last 12 months, as well as any future matches that have been scheduled.

Win Draw Loss Fixture

=== 2025 ===
27 October Friendly	Mexico	1–3	Zambia	United Arab Emirates
--:-- UTC+4

30 October Friendly	Zambia	3–0	New Caledonia	United Arab Emirates
--:-- UTC+4

4 November 2025 FIFA U-17 World Cup	Indonesia	v	Zambia	Al Rayyan, Qatar
18:45 UTC+3		Report		Stadium: Aspire Zone (Pitch 8), Al Rayyan

7 November 2025 FIFA U-17 World Cup	Zambia	v	Honduras	Al Rayyan, Qatar
18:45 UTC+3		2025 FIFA U-17 World Cup#Group J		Stadium: Aspire Zone (Pitch 7), Al Rayyan

10 November 2025 FIFA U-17 World Cup	Zambia	v	Brazil	Al Rayyan, Qatar
17:45 UTC+3		Report		Stadium: Aspire Zone (Pitch 8), Al Rayyan

== See also ==
- Zambia women's national under-17 football team
- Zambia men's national under-20 football team
