= Gambia national under-17 football team =

National under-17 association football team representing Gambia

Gambia U-17
- Nickname: Baby Scorpions
- Association: Gambia Football Federation
- Confederation: CAF (Africa)
- Head coach: Abdoulie Bojang
- Home stadium: Independence Stadium
- FIFA code: GAM

Africa U-17 Cup of Nations
- Appearances: 4 (first in 2003)
- Best result: Champions (2005, 2009)

FIFA U-17 World Cup
- Appearances: 2 (first in 2005)
- Best result: Group Stage (2005, 2009)

The Gambia national under-17 football team is the U-17 football team of the Gambia and is controlled by the Gambia Football Federation.

== History ==
The team won the Africa U-17 Cup of Nations in 2005 & 2009. The 2005 team caused one of the biggest upsets in FIFA U-17 World Cup history after defeating Brazil 3–1.Captain of the team (2005) was Ousman jallow.

== Competitive record ==
=== FIFA U-17 World Cup record ===
FIFA U-17 World Cup Record
| Hosts/Year | Round | GP | W | D | L | GS | GA |
|---|---|---|---|---|---|---|---|
| (China) 1985 | Did not enter | | | | | | |
| (Canada) 1987 | Withdrew | | | | | | |
| (Scotland) 1989 | Did not enter | | | | | | |
| (Italy) 1991 | Did not enter | | | | | | |
| (Japan) 1993 | Did not enter | | | | | | |
| (Ecuador) 1995 | Did not enter | | | | | | |
| (Egypt) 1997 | Did not enter | | | | | | |
| (New Zealand) 1999 | Did not enter | | | | | | |
| (Trinidad and Tobago) 2001 | Did not qualify | | | | | | |
| (Finland) 2003 | Did not qualify | | | | | | |
| (Peru) 2005 | Group Stage | 3 | 2 | 0 | 1 | 6 | 4 |
| (South Korea) 2007 | Did not qualify | | | | | | |
| (Nigeria) 2009 | Group Stage | 3 | 0 | 1 | 2 | 3 | 6 |
| (Mexico) 2011 | Did not qualify | | | | | | |
| (United Arab Emirates) 2013 | Did not qualify | | | | | | |
| (Chile) 2015 | Did not qualify | | | | | | |
| (India) 2017 | Did not enter | | | | | | |
| (Brazil) 2019 | Did not qualify | | | | | | |
| (Indonesia) 2023 | Did not qualify | | | | | | |
| (Qatar) 2025 | To be determined | | | | | | |
| Total | 3/20 | 6 | 2 | 1 | 3 | 9 | 10 |

=== Africa U-17 Cup of Nations record ===
African U-17 Championship
| Hosts/Year | Round | GP | W | D | L | GS | GA |
|---|---|---|---|---|---|---|---|
| (Mali) 1995 | Did not enter | | | | | | |
| (Botswana) 1997 | Did not enter | | | | | | |
| (Guinea) 1999 | Did not enter | | | | | | |
| (Seychelles) 2001 | Did not qualify | | | | | | |
| (Eswatini) 2003 | Group Stage | 3 | 1 | 1 | 1 | 3 | 3 |
| (The Gambia) 2005 | Champions | 5 | 4 | 0 | 1 | 7 | 4 |
| (Togo) 2007 | Did not qualify | | | | | | |
| (Algeria) 2009 | Champions | 5 | 5 | 0 | 0 | 12 | 1 |
| (Rwanda) 2011 | Group Stage | 3 | 1 | 0 | 2 | 2 | 7 |
| (Morocco) 2013 | Did not qualify | | | | | | |
| (Niger) 2015 | Did not qualify | | | | | | |
| (Gabon) 2017 | Did not enter | | | | | | |
| (Tanzania) 2019 | Did not qualify | | | | | | |
| (Algeria) 2023 | Did not enter | | | | | | |
| (Morocco) 2025 | Did not qualify | | | | | | |
| Total | 4/15 | 16 | 11 | 1 | 4 | 24 | 15 |

=== CAF U-16 and U-17 World Cup Qualifiers record ===
CAF U-16 and U-17 World Cup Qualifiers
Appearances: 0
| Year | Round | Position | Pld | W | D | L | GF | GA |
|---|---|---|---|---|---|---|---|---|
| 1985 | Did not enter | | | | | | | |
| 1987 | Withdrew | | | | | | | |
| 1989 | Did not enter | | | | | | | |
| 1991 | Fourth round | - | 4 | 2 | 1 | 1 | 10 | 2 |
| 1993 | Did not enter | | | | | | | |
| Total | 1/5 | | | | | | | |
