= Burkina Faso national under-17 football team =

National under-17 association football team representing Burkina Faso

Burkina Faso Under-17
- Nickname(s): Les Étalons (The Stallions)
- Association: Burkinabé Football Federation
- Confederation: CAF (Africa)
- Sub-confederation: WAFU (West Africa)
- Head coach: Oscar Barro
- Home stadium: Stade du 4-Août
- FIFA code: BFA
First colours	Second colours

U-17 Africa Cup of Nations
- Appearances: 8 (first in 1999)
- Best result: Champions (2011)

FIFA U-17 World Cup
- Appearances: 5 (first in 1999)
- Best result: Third place (2001)

The Burkina Faso national under-17 football team is the national under-17 football team of Burkina Faso and is controlled by the Fédération Burkinabé de Foot-Ball. The team's main objectives are to qualify and play at the Africa U-17 Cup of Nations and the FIFA U-17 World Cup.

== Competitive record ==
=== FIFA U-17 World Cup record ===
FIFA U-17 World Cup
Year	Round	GP	W	D^{1}	L	GS	GA
(China) 1985	Did Not Enter						
(Canada) 1987	Did Not Enter						
(Scotland) 1989	Did Not Enter						
(Italy) 1991	Did not qualify						
(Japan) 1993	Did Not Enter						
(Ecuador) 1995	Did Not Enter						
(Egypt) 1997	Did not qualify						
(New Zealand) 1999	Group Stage	3	1	1	1	4	4
(Trinidad and Tobago) 2001	Third Place	6	3	2	1	8	4
(Finland) 2003	Did not qualify						
(Peru) 2005	Did not qualify						
(South Korea) 2007	Did not qualify						
(Nigeria) 2009	Round of 16	4	1	1	2	6	7
(Mexico) 2011	Group Stage	3	0	0	3	0	6
(United Arab Emirates) 2013	Did not qualify						
(Chile) 2015	Did not qualify						
(India) 2017	Did not qualify						
(Brazil) 2019	Did not qualify						
(Peru) 2021	Did not qualify						
(Indonesia) 2023	Group Stage	3	1	0	2	3	6
(Qatar) 2025	Quarter-finals	6	3	1	2	6	4
(Qatar) 2026	Did not qualify						
(Qatar) 2027	To be determined						
(Qatar) 2028	To be determined						
(Qatar) 2029	To be determined						
Total	Third Place	24	9	5	10	27	30

=== U-17 Africa Cup of Nations record ===
U-17 Africa Cup of Nations
Year	Round	Pld	W	D	L	GF	GA
(Mali) 1995	Did Not Enter						
(Botswana) 1997	Did not qualify						
(Guinea) 1999	Runners-up	5	2	2	1	5	5
(Seychelles) 2001	Runners-up	5	3	1	1	7	7
(Eswatini) 2003	Did not qualify						
(The Gambia) 2005	Group Stage	3	1	0	2	3	5
(Togo) 2007	Group Stage	3	1	0	2	5	5
(Algeria) 2009	Third Place	4	3	0	1	10	3
(Rwanda) 2011	Champions	5	3	1	1	11	6
(Morocco) 2013	Did not qualify						
(Niger) 2015	Did not qualify						
(Gabon) 2017	Did not qualify						
(Tanzania) 2019	Did not qualify						
(Algeria) 2023	Third Place	5	3	0	1	7	5
(Morocco) 2025	Fourth Place	6	4	1	1	13	6
(Morocco) 2026	Did not qualify						
Total	Champions	37	22	4	10	62	43

=== CAF U-16 and U-17 World Cup Qualifiers record ===
CAF U-16 and U-17 World Cup Qualifiers Record
Appearances: 1
Year	Round	Pld	W	D*	L	GF	GA
1985	Did Not Enter						
1987	Did Not Enter						
1989	Did Not Enter						
1991	Second Round	2	0	1	1	0	1
1993	Did Not Enter						
Total	Second Round	2	0	1	1	0	1

- Denotes draws include knockout matches decided on penalty kicks.

== Current squad ==
The following players were named in the squad for the 2025 U-17 Africa Cup of Nations between 30 March – 19 April 2025.

Caps and goals are correct as of 31 March 2025, after the match against Cameroon.

No.	Pos.	Player	Date of birth (age)	Caps	Goals	Club
1	GK	Soungalo Arnauld Konaté	10 August 2008 (age 18)	0	0	(Burkinabé Football Federation) Majestic
16	GK	Prince Hamed Ouédraogo	31 December 2009 (age 16)	1	0	(Burkinabé Football Federation) Réal du Faso
23	GK	Cire Alassane Traoré	26 June 2010 (age 16)	0	0	(Burkinabé Football Federation) Rahimo
2	DF	Cheik Oumar Sanogo	7 April 2009 (age 17)	0	0	(Burkinabé Football Federation) Rahimo
3	DF	Mikael Coulibaly	30 October 2008 (age 17)	1	0	(Burkinabé Football Federation) Réal du Faso
4	DF	Issouf Dabo	26 May 2009 (age 17)	1	0	(Burkinabé Football Federation) New Stars
5	DF	Fadil Adama Barro	2 April 2008 (age 18)	1	0	(Burkinabé Football Federation) Vitesse
18	DF	Ali Koné	28 April 2009 (age 17)	0	0	(Burkinabé Football Federation) New Stars
21	DF	Adriana Edouard Dambre	12 November 2010 (age 15)	0	0	(Qatar Football Association) Al Sadd
22	DF	Abdoul Moumine Ouédraogo	31 December 2009 (age 16)	1	0	(Burkinabé Football Federation) Ouagadougou
6	MF	Mohamed Fofana	19 May 2008 (age 18)	1	0	(Burkinabé Football Federation) New Stars
8	MF	Mohamed Junior Sako	14 January 2009 (age 17)	1	0	Unknown
9	MF	Halidou Diakité	19 June 2009 (age 17)	1	0	Unknown
13	MF	Bilhack Mohamed Konaté	12 August 2010 (age 16)	0	0	Unknown
14	MF	Adesina Hamed Ramanou	9 March 2010 (age 16)	0	0	(Burkinabé Football Federation) New Stars
15	MF	Kassoum Nana	4 November 2008 (age 17)	1	0	Unknown
20	MF	Assifou Koné	31 December 2009 (age 16)	0	0	(Burkinabé Football Federation) Academie Football Tenakourou
7	FW	Issouf Junior Bara	8 April 2009 (age 17)	1	0	(Burkinabé Football Federation) Rahimo
10	FW	Alassana Bagayogo	24 December 2008 (age 17)	1	0	(Burkinabé Football Federation) Bobo Dioulasso
11	FW	Abdoulaye Latif Junior Diaby	20 October 2008 (age 18)	1	0	Unknown
19	FW	Asharaf Loukman Tapsoba	30 March 2010 (age 16)	1	2	(Burkinabé Football Federation) Réal du Faso

== Recent call-ups ==
The following players have previously been called up to the Burkina Faso under-17 squad and remain eligible.

Pos.	Player	Date of birth (age)	Caps	Goals	Club	Latest call-up
