= Senegal national under-17 football team =

National under-17 association football team representing Senegal

Senegal U-17
- Nickname(s): Les Lions de la Teranga (Young Lions of Teranga)
- Association: Senegalese Football Federation
- Confederation: CAF (Africa)
- Head coach: Serigne Dia
- Home stadium: Stade Léopold Sédar Senghor
- FIFA code: SEN
First colours	Second colours

U-17 Africa Cup of Nations
- Appearances: 5 (first in 2011)
- Best result: Champions (2023, 2026)

FIFA U-17 World Cup
- Appearances: 2 (first in 2019)
- Best result: Round of 16 (2019, 2023)

The Senegal national under-17 football team, represents Senegal in international football at an under-17 level and is controlled by the Fédération Sénégalaise de Football. The team's first appearance on the continental stage was in 2011 at the 2011 African U-17 Championship. Senegal made their first appearance at the FIFA U-17 World Cup in 2019 in Brazil after Guinea was disqualified for fielding two overage players.

== Competitive Record ==
=== Africa U-17 Cup of Nations ===
Africa U-17 Cup of Nations
Year	Round	Position	GP	W	D*	L	GS	GA
(Mali) 1995	did not qualify							
(Botswana) 1997	did not qualify							
(Guinea) 1999	did not qualify							
(Seychelles) 2001	did not qualify							
(Eswatini) 2003	did not qualify							
(The Gambia) 2005	did not qualify							
(Togo) 2007	did not qualify							
(Algeria) 2009	did not qualify							
(Rwanda) 2011	Group stage	3rd	3	1	0	2	4	5
(Morocco) 2013	did not qualify							
(Niger) 2015	did not qualify							
(Gabon) 2017	did not qualify							
(Tanzania) 2019	Group stage	3rd	3	0	2	1	2	3
(Morocco) 2021	Cancelled							
(Algeria) 2023	Champions	1st	6	5	1	0	15	2
(Morocco) 2025	Quarter-finals		4	2	2	0	3	0
(Morocco) 2026	Champions	1st	6	2	3	1	7	6
Total:5/16	2 Titles		22	10	8	4	31	16

*Draws include knockout matches decided on penalty kicks.

=== FIFA U-16 and U-17 World Cup record ===
FIFA U-16 and U-17 World Cup
Year	Round	Position	GP	W	D	L	GS	GA
(China) 1985	Did not enter							
(Canada) 1987	Did not enter							
(Scotland) 1989	Withdrew							
(Italy) 1991	Did not enter							
(Japan) 1993	Did not enter							
(Ecuador) 1995	Did not qualify							
(Egypt) 1997	Did not qualify							
(New Zealand) 1999	Did not qualify							
(Trinidad and Tobago) 2001	Did not qualify							
(Finland) 2003	Did not qualify							
(Peru) 2005	Did not qualify							
(South Korea) 2007	Did not qualify							
(Nigeria) 2009	Did not qualify							
(Mexico) 2011	Did not qualify							
(United Arab Emirates) 2013	Did not qualify							
(Chile) 2015	Did not qualify							
(India) 2017	Did not qualify							
(Brazil) 2019	Round of 16	14th	4	2	0	2	8	5
(Peru) 2021	Cancelled							
(Indonesia) 2023	Round of 16	10th	4	2	1	1	6	4
(Qatar) 2025	Round of 32	20th	4	2	1	1	6	1
(Qatar) 2026	In progress	TBD	1	0	1	0	1	1
Total:4/21	Round of 16	10th	13	6	3	4	21	11

== Current squad ==
The following players were called up to the squad for the 2025 U-17 Africa Cup of Nations.

No.	Pos.	Player	Date of birth (age)	Club
1	GK	Mamadou Diabaté Gueye	20 July 2009 (aged 15)	(Senegalese Football Federation) Diambars FC
2	DF	Lamine Mbengue	7 August 2009 (aged 15)	(Senegalese Football Federation) Génération Foot
3	DF	Ibrahima Aïdara	20 August 2008 (aged 16)	(Senegalese Football Federation) Diambars FC
4	DF	El Hadji Malick Cissé	5 January 2008 (aged 17)	(Senegalese Football Federation) Sahel FC
5	DF	Cheikh Dieng	7 March 2009 (aged 16)	(Senegalese Football Federation) Diambars FC
6	MF	Maurice Biaye	14 January 2009 (aged 16)	(Senegalese Football Federation) AF Darou Salam
7	FW	Sidy Barhama Ndiaye	31 December 2009 (aged 15)	(Senegalese Football Federation) Diambars FC
8	MF	Ibrahima Sory Sow	20 October 2008 (aged 16)	(Senegalese Football Federation) Génération Foot
9	FW	Abdourahmane Mbodj	22 April 2008 (aged 16)	(Senegalese Football Federation) Génération Foot
10	MF	El Hadji Ibrahima Sow	12 December 2009 (aged 15)	(Senegalese Football Federation) Dakar Sacré-Cœur
11	MF	Aliou Gueye	23 October 2009 (aged 15)	(Senegalese Football Federation) Espoirs Guédiawaye
12	FW	Ibrahima Diallo	20 October 2009 (aged 15)	(Senegalese Football Federation) AF Darou Salam
13	DF	Ahmadou Bamba Kane	7 November 2009 (aged 15)	(Senegalese Football Federation) Diambars FC
14	FW	Cheikhna Sadibou Sane	3 January 2008 (aged 17)	(Senegalese Football Federation) Dakar Sacré-Cœur
15	MF	Ousseynou Ndiaye	11 October 2008 (aged 16)	(Senegalese Football Federation) United Academie
16	GK	Vincent Gomis	7 February 2008 (aged 17)	(Senegalese Football Federation) Génération Foot
17	FW	El Hadji Baytir Fall	23 August 2009 (aged 15)	(Senegalese Football Federation) Amitié FC
18	DF	Alpha Mbengue	9 May 2008 (aged 16)	(Senegalese Football Federation) Génération Foot
19	FW	Mbacke Ndiaye	20 December 2008 (aged 16)	(Senegalese Football Federation) AF Darou Salam
20	FW	Etienne Mendy	25 July 2008 (aged 16)	(Senegalese Football Federation) Diambars FC
21	GK	Assane Sarr	10 July 2010 (aged 14)	(Senegalese Football Federation) Ndangane FC
22	DF	Omar Cisse	22 November 2008 (aged 16)	(Senegalese Football Federation) AF Darou Salam
23	FW	Mouhamed Wagner	5 January 2009 (aged 16)	(Senegalese Football Federation) Diambars FC

== Head-to-head record ==
The following table shows Senegal's head-to-head record in the FIFA U-17 World Cup.

Opponent	Pld	W	D	L	GF	GA	GD	Win %
Argentina	1	1	0	0	2	1	+1	100.00
France	1	0	1	0	0	0	+0	0.00
Japan	2	0	0	2	0	3	−3	0.00
Netherlands	1	1	0	0	3	1	+2	100.00
Poland	1	1	0	0	4	1	+3	100.00
Spain	1	0	0	1	1	2	−1	0.00
United States	1	1	0	0	4	1	+3	100.00
Total	8	4	1	3	14	9	+5	50.00

== See also ==
- Senegal national football team
- Senegal national under-20 football team
