= Cameroon national under-17 football team =

Football team representing Cameroon

Cameroon U-17
- Nickname(s): Les Lions Indomptables (The Indomitable Lions)
- Association: Fédération Camerounaise de Football
- Confederation: CAF (Africa)
- Head coach: Thomas Libiih
- FIFA code: CMR
First colours	Second colours

Biggest defeat
- Ghana 4–0 Cameroon (Port-Gentil, Gabon; 14 May 2017)

FIFA U-17 World Cup
- Appearances: 2 (first in 2003)
- Best result: Group stage (2003, 2019)

U-17 Africa Cup of Nations
- Appearances: 8 (first in 1999)
- Best result: Champions (2003, 2019)

The Cameroon national under-17 football team represents Cameroon in football at this age level and is controlled by the Fédération Camerounaise de Football. The team competes in the UNIFFAC Cup, Africa U-17 Cup of Nations and FIFA U-17 World Cup, both held every two years.

== Competitive record ==
=== FIFA U-17 World Cup record ===
FIFA U-17 World Cup Record
Hosts/Year	Round	GP	W	D*	L	GS	GA
(China) 1985	Did not enter						
(Canada) 1987	Did not qualify						
(Scotland) 1989	Did not qualify						
(Italy) 1991	Did not qualify						
(Japan) 1993	Did not enter						
(Ecuador) 1995	Withdrew						
(Egypt) 1997	Did not enter						
(New Zealand) 1999	Did not qualify						
(Trinidad and Tobago) 2001	Did not qualify						
(Finland) 2003	Group stage	3	0	3	0	7	7
(Peru) 2005	Did not qualify						
(South Korea) 2007	Did not qualify						
(Nigeria) 2009	Did not qualify						
(Mexico) 2011	Did not qualify						
(United Arab Emirates) 2013	Did not qualify						
(Chile) 2015	Did not qualify						
(India) 2017	Did not qualify						
(Brazil) 2019	Group stage	3	0	0	3	1	6
(Indonesia) 2023	Did not qualify						
(Qatar) 2025	Did not qualify						
(Qatar) 2026	In progress	1	0	0	1	1	2
Total:3/21	Group stage	7	0	3	4	9	15

=== U-17 Africa Cup of Nations record ===
U-17 Africa Cup of Nations
Hosts/Year	Round	GP	W	D*	L	GS	GA
(Mali) 1995	Withdrew						
(Botswana) 1997	Did not enter						
(Guinea) 1999	Fourth place	5	1	2	2	4	5
(Seychelles) 2001	Group stage	3	1	1	1	7	3
(Eswatini) 2003	Champions	5	3	1	1	10	8
(The Gambia) 2005	Did not qualify						
(Togo) 2007	Did not qualify						
(Algeria) 2009	Group stage	3	0	1	2	0	3
(Rwanda) 2011	Did not qualify						
(Morocco) 2013	Did not qualify						
(Niger) 2015	Group stage	3	0	0	3	3	8
(Gabon) 2017	Group stage	3	1	1	1	2	5
(Tanzania) 2019	Champions	5	2	1	0	11	1
(Algeria) 2023	Group stage	2	0	0	2	1	4
(Morocco) 2025	To be determined						
Total	Champions	29	11	6	13	38	37

=== CAF U-16 and U-17 World Cup Qualifiers record ===
CAF U-16 and U-17 World Cup Qualifiers
Appearances: 3
Year	Round	Pld	W	D*	L	GF	GA
1985	Did Not Enter						
1987	Second round	2	1	0	1	3	3
1989	Second round	2	1	0	1	2	2
1991	Third round	2	0	1	1	0	1
1993	Did Not Enter						
Total	Third round	6	2	1	3	5	6

- Denotes draws include knockout matches decided on penalty kicks.#

== Current squad ==
The 21 following players were named in the squad on 11 November 2026, for the 2026 FIFA U-17 World Cup by head coach Thomas Libiih.

No.	Pos.	Player	Date of birth (age)	Club
1	GK	Junior Lopez	23 September 2008 (age 18)	(Cameroonian Football Federation) Kadji Sports Academy
22	GK	Julliard Abeng	31 July 2008 (age 18)	(Cameroonian Football Federation) Colombe Sportive
5	DF	Dieu ne Dort Pascal Adjini Avama	9 April 2009 (age 17)	(Cameroonian Football Federation) Coton Sport
11	DF	Arnaud Tsombeng	15 June 2009 (age 17)	(Cameroonian Football Federation) Player FC
18	DF	Georges Esingala	17 June 2009 (age 17)	(Cameroonian Football Federation) Best Stars Academy
12	DF	Noel Doumbogo	31 December 2008 (age 17)	(Cameroonian Football Federation) Academy Foot Douala
8	MF	Joël Biwole	14 September 2008 (age 18)	(Cameroonian Football Federation) Dauphine ASC
13	MF	Evan Edjoto	28 August 2008 (age 18)	
14	MF	Leopold Longa Bidichou	5 August 2008 (age 18)	
15	MF	Ralph Jovan Fometesong	20 November 2008 (age 18)	(Cameroonian Football Federation) Best Stars Academy
6	MF	David Mimbang	15 August 2008 (age 18)	(Cameroonian Football Federation) Brasseries du Cameroun
3	MF	Oscar Eyen	1 September 2008 (age 18)	
10	MF	David Yannick Bondoma	9 September 2009 (age 17)	(Cameroonian Football Federation) Oyili FC
7	FW	Franck Luma	8 October 2008 (age 18)	(Cameroonian Football Federation) Best Stars Academy
17	FW	Arnold Massokon	2 January 2010 (age 16)	
19	FW	Oumar Tsombeng	20 September 2010 (age 16)	(Cameroonian Football Federation) Player FC
20	FW	Jean Charles Bebe	11 November 2008 (age 18)	(Cameroonian Football Federation) Fauve Azur Elite
21	FW	Abdoul Razak Mbouombouo	6 June 2009 (age 17)	
23	FW	Fonda Joshua Moussongo	3 May 2009 (age 17)	(Cameroonian Football Federation) Brasseries du Cameroun

== Head-to-head record ==
The following table shows Cameroon's head-to-head record in the FIFA U-17 World Cup.

Opponent	Pld	W	D	L	GF	GA	GD	Win %
Argentina	1	0	0	1	1	3	−2	0.00
Brazil	1	0	1	0	1	1	+0	0.00
Portugal	1	0	1	0	5	5	+0	0.00
Spain	1	0	0	1	0	2	−2	0.00
Tajikistan	1	0	0	1	0	1	−1	0.00
Yemen	1	0	1	0	1	1	+0	0.00
Total	6	0	3	3	8	13	−5	0.00
