= 2007 African U-17 Championship =

Tournament details
- Host country: Togo
- City: Lomé
- Dates: 10–25 March
- Teams: 8 (from 1 confederation)

Final positions
- Champions: Nigeria (2nd title)
- Runners-up: Togo
- Third place: Ghana
- Fourth place: Tunisia

Tournament statistics
- Matches played: 16
- Goals scored: 49 (3.06 per match)

The 2007 African U-17 Championship was a football competition organized by the Confederation of African Football (CAF). The tournament took place in Togo. For the first time, the top four teams qualified for the 2007 FIFA U-17 World Cup (because of the expansion from 16 teams to 24) instead of three, as it has been on previous tournaments.

== Qualification ==
=== Qualified teams ===
- Burkina Faso
- Eritrea
- Gabon
- Ghana
- Nigeria
- South Africa
- Togo (host nation)
- Tunisia

== Group stage ==
=== Group A ===
Pos	Team	Pld	W	D	L	GF	GA	GD	Pts	Qualification
1	Togo (H)	3	2	0	1	4	4	0	6	Knockout stage
2	Tunisia	3	1	2	0	5	2	+3	5	Knockout stage
3	South Africa	3	1	1	1	5	5	0	4	
4	Gabon	3	0	1	2	2	5	−3	1	

Rules for classification: Group stage tiebreakers
(H) Hosts
10 March 2007

Togo	2–0	South Africa

10 March 2007

Gabon	0–0	Tunisia

13 March 2007

South Africa	3–1	Gabon

13 March 2007

Tunisia	3–0	Togo

16 March 2007

South Africa	2–2	Tunisia

16 March 2007

Togo	2–1	Gabon

=== Group B ===
Pos	Team	Pld	W	D	L	GF	GA	GD	Pts	Qualification
1	Nigeria	3	3	0	0	12	1	+11	9	Knockout stage
2	Ghana	3	2	0	1	9	3	+6	6	Knockout stage
3	Burkina Faso	3	1	0	2	5	5	0	3	
4	Eritrea	3	0	0	3	0	17	−17	0	

Rules for classification: Group stage tiebreakers
11 March 2007

Ghana	3–1	Burkina Faso

11 March 2007

Nigeria	8–0	Eritrea

14 March 2007

Burkina Faso	1–2	Nigeria

14 March 2007

Eritrea	0–6	Ghana

17 March 2007

Burkina Faso	3–0	Eritrea

17 March 2007

Nigeria	2–0	Ghana

== Knock-out stage ==
=== Semifinals ===
20 March 2007

Togo	2–1	Ghana

20 March 2007

Nigeria	2–0	Tunisia

=== Third place match ===
24 March 2007

Ghana	1–0	Tunisia

=== Final ===
25 March 2007

Togo	0–1	Nigeria

== Winners ==
2007 CAF Under-17 Championship
(Nigeria)
Nigeria
Second title
