= Benin national under-17 football team =

National under-17 association football team representing Benin

Benin U-17
- Nickname(s): Les Guépards (The Cheetahs); Formerly: Les Ecureuils (The Squirrels)
- Association: Benin Football Federation
- Confederation: CAF (Africa)
- Sub-confederation: WAFU (West Africa)
- Home stadium: Stade de l'Amitié
- FIFA code: BEN
First colours	Second colours

U-17 Africa Cup of Nations
- Appearances: None

FIFA U-17 World Cup
- Appearances: None

The Benin national under-17 football team represents Benin at under-17 association football youth international matches and U-17 Africa Cup of Nations.

In September 2018 they were disqualified from the WAFU U-17 Championship, and in October 2018 10 players were jailed, due to age fraud.

== Competitive record ==
=== FIFA U-16 and U-17 World Cup record ===
FIFA U-16 and U-17 World Cup
Year	Round	GP	W	D^{1}	L	GS	GA
(China) 1985	Did not qualify						
(Canada) 1987	Did not qualify						
(Scotland) 1989	Did not qualify						
(Italy) 1991	Did not qualify						
(Japan) 1993	Did not qualify						
(Ecuador) 1995	Did not qualify						
(Egypt) 1997	Did not qualify						
(New Zealand) 1999	Did not qualify						
(Trinidad and Tobago) 2001	Did not qualify						
(Finland) 2003	Did not qualify						
(Peru) 2005	Did not qualify						
(South Korea) 2007	Did not qualify						
(Nigeria) 2009	Did not qualify						
(Mexico) 2011	Did not qualify						
(United Arab Emirates) 2013	Did not qualify						
(Chile) 2015	Did not qualify						
(India) 2017	Did not qualify						
(Brazil) 2019	Did not qualify						
(Indonesia) 2023	Did not qualify						
(Qatar) 2025	Did not qualify						
(Qatar) 2026	Did not qualify						
Total	0/21	0	0	0	0	0	0

^{1}Draws include knockout matches decided on penalty kicks.

== See also ==
- Benin national football team
- Benin national under-20 football team
