= 2026 U-17 Africa Cup of Nations squads =

Football tournament squads

The 2026 Africa U-17 Cup of Nations is an international age-restricted football tournament which is currently being held in Morocco from 13 May to 2 June 2026.

The 16 national teams involved in the tournament were required to register a squad of 21 players with an option of up to 5 more additional players, including three goalkeepers. Only players born on or after 1 January 2009 are eligible to be registered in these squads, only players registered in the squads are eligible to take part in the tournament.

== Group A ==
=== Egypt ===
The final squad was announced on 3 May 2026.

Head coach: Hussein Abdel-Latif

No.	Pos.	Player	Date of birth (age)	Club
1	GK	Mohamed Ebeid	3 May 2010 (aged 16)	(Egyptian Football Association) Al Ahly
16	GK	Malek Amr	4 May 2009 (aged 17)	(Egyptian Football Association) Zamalek
23	GK	Abdelaziz Mahmoud	1 January 2009 (aged 17)	(Egyptian Football Association) Pharco
2	DF	Mohamed El-Sayed	15 August 2009 (aged 16)	(Egyptian Football Association) Al Ahly
3	DF	Adam Youssef	17 October 2009 (aged 16)	(Egyptian Football Association) Al Ahly
4	DF	Yassin Tamer	11 March 2009 (aged 17)	(Egyptian Football Association) Arab Contractors
6	DF	Adel Alaa	9 September 2009 (aged 16)	(Egyptian Football Association) Ghazl El Mahalla
12	DF	Ameir Hassan	18 January 2009 (aged 17)	(Royal Dutch Football Association) Utrecht
20	DF	Abdalla Amr	28 January 2009 (aged 17)	(Egyptian Football Association) ENPPI
21	DF	Omar Fouda	2 April 2009 (aged 17)	(United Arab Emirates Football Association) Al-Nasr
24	DF	Saif El Mahdy	15 April 2009 (aged 17)	(Egyptian Football Association) Al Ahly
5	MF	Mohamed Nour	15 March 2009 (aged 17)	(United States Soccer Federation) SoCal Reds
7	MF	Mohamed Gamal	12 December 2009 (aged 16)	(Egyptian Football Association) ENPPI
8	MF	Ahmed Beshir	1 September 2009 (aged 16)	(Egyptian Football Association) Ceramica Cleopatra
10	MF	Ahmed Safwat (Captain)	23 March 2009 (aged 17)	(Egyptian Football Association) Zamalek
11	MF	Daniel Tamer	25 June 2009 (aged 16)	(Egyptian Football Association) ZED
13	MF	Youssef Osman	1 January 2009 (aged 17)	(Egyptian Football Association) ZED
14	MF	Ziad Soudi	25 May 2009 (aged 16)	(Egyptian Football Association) Pyramids
15	MF	Omar Abdelrahim	27 April 2009 (aged 17)	(Egyptian Football Association) Al Ahly
18	MF	Saif Karim	15 March 2009 (aged 17)	(Egyptian Football Association) Al Ahly
22	MF	Baraa Mahmoud	1 January 2009 (aged 17)	(Egyptian Football Association) ZED
25	MF	Yehia Wael	1 January 2009 (aged 17)	(Egyptian Football Association) Al Ahly
9	FW	Adham Hasseib	1 August 2009 (aged 16)	(Egyptian Football Association) Zamalek
17	FW	Abdelaziz Khaled "Evouna"	13 January 2009 (aged 17)	(Egyptian Football Association) Al Ahly
19	FW	Khaled Mokhtar	13 January 2009 (aged 17)	(Egyptian Football Association) ZED
26	FW	Amir Abou El-Ezz	11 June 2009 (aged 16)	(Italian Football Federation) AC Monza

=== Ethiopia ===
The final squad was announced on 12 May 2026.

Head coach: (United States) Benjamin Ziemer

No.	Pos.	Player	Date of birth (age)	Club
1	GK	Temesgen Kebede	2 February 2009 (aged 17)	(Ethiopian Football Federation) Sheger City
20	GK	Eyosiyas Mekbib	10 October 2009 (aged 16)	(Ethiopian Football Federation) Ethiopian Medhin
21	GK	Milinem Dubale	22 May 2010 (aged 15)	(Ethiopian Football Federation) Sidama Bunna
2	DF	Seyfedin Umer	22 September 2010 (aged 15)	(Ethiopian Football Federation) Adama Ketema
3	DF	Dinkneh W/Yohannes	26 February 2010 (aged 16)	(Ethiopian Football Federation) Hadiya Hossana
4	DF	Tinsae Mengistu	10 August 2010 (aged 15)	(Ethiopian Football Federation) Saint George
6	DF	Cherinet Samuel	12 October 2010 (aged 15)	(Ethiopian Football Federation) Wolaitta Dicha
13	DF	Abenezer Alemayehu	8 April 2010 (aged 16)	(Ethiopian Football Federation) Wolaitta Dicha
15	DF	Efison Kidane	22 March 2010 (aged 16)	(Ethiopian Football Federation) Wolaitta Dicha
16	DF	Zelalem Mengistu	26 October 2009 (aged 16)	(Ethiopian Football Federation) Sheger City
5	MF	Kalid Akmel	15 January 2009 (aged 17)	(Ethiopian Football Federation) Ethio Electric
8	MF	Kidus Dawit	19 January 2009 (aged 17)	(Ethiopian Football Federation) CBE
10	MF	Binyam Abrha	25 August 2011 (aged 14)	(Ethiopian Football Federation) Sheger City
11	MF	Amir Misbah	25 October 2010 (aged 15)	(Ethiopian Football Federation) Saint George
14	MF	Amanuel Guta	1 July 2010 (aged 15)	(Ethiopian Football Federation) Wolaitta Dicha
17	MF	Chernet Ufaysa	17 June 2011 (aged 14)	(Ethiopian Football Federation) Wolaitta Dicha
7	FW	Eniyew Selesh	21 August 2010 (aged 15)	(Ethiopian Football Federation) Saint George
9	FW	Dawit Kassaw	25 May 2010 (aged 15)	(Ethiopian Football Federation) Sheger City
12	FW	Uzeyfa Shafi	25 October 2009 (aged 16)	(Ethiopian Football Federation) CBE
18	FW	Biruk Eylachew	25 August 2010 (aged 15)	(Ethiopian Football Federation) Ethio Electric
19	FW	Mandela Shutula	22 May 2010 (aged 15)	(Ethiopian Football Federation) Sidama Bunna

=== Morocco ===
The final squad was announced on 9 May 2026.

Head coach: (Portugal) Tiago Lima Pereira

No.	Pos.	Player	Date of birth (age)	Club
1	GK	Adam El-Maach	16 March 2009 (aged 17)	(Royal Dutch Football Association) Helmond
12	GK	Mohamed Harouch	18 May 2009 (aged 16)	(Royal Moroccan Football Federation) Mohammed VI Academy
22	GK	Rayan Yaakoubi	29 April 2009 (aged 17)	(Royal Belgian Football Association) Gent
2	DF	Ayman Tahri		(Royal Moroccan Football Federation) Berkane
3	DF	Mehdi Amehmoul	4 April 2009 (aged 17)	(Royal Moroccan Football Federation) Raja
4	DF	Adam Soudi	18 March 2009 (aged 17)	(French Football Federation) Toulouse
5	DF	Mohamed Habib Zinbi	17 November 2009 (aged 16)	(Royal Belgian Football Association) Anderlecht
13	DF	Adam Ellaky	9 January 2009 (aged 17)	(Royal Moroccan Football Federation) Wydad
14	DF	Adam Alioui	26 June 2009 (aged 16)	(French Football Federation) Lyon
15	DF	Hamza Chalali	7 May 2009 (aged 17)	(Royal Moroccan Football Federation) FUS Rabat
23	DF	Wael Jolissaint	17 December 2009 (aged 16)	(Swiss Football Association) Neuchâtel Xamax
6	MF	Marouane Bentaleb	16 May 2009 (aged 16)	(Royal Dutch Football Association) Ajax
8	MF	Oualid Ibn Salah	5 November 2009 (aged 16)	(Royal Moroccan Football Federation) Mohammed VI Academy
10	MF	Ilian Hadidi	6 March 2009 (aged 17)	(Royal Belgian Football Association) Standard Liège
16	MF	Imran Talai	3 February 2009 (aged 17)	(Royal Dutch Football Association) Ajax
18	MF	Rayan Khadraoui	28 January 2009 (aged 17)	(German Football Association) Borussia Mönchengladbach
20	MF	Yahia Saidi	19 June 2009 (aged 16)	(Royal Moroccan Football Federation) FUS Rabat
21	MF	Mohamed Amine Moustache	25 January 2009 (aged 17)	(Royal Belgian Football Association) Oud-Heverlee Leuven
24	MF	Ibrahim Faik	22 May 2009 (aged 16)	(Royal Dutch Football Association) Feyenoord
25	MF	Luis Velilles	28 April 2009 (aged 17)	(Royal Spanish Football Federation) Alavés
26	MF	Ayman Ezzarky		(Royal Moroccan Football Federation) Mohammed VI Academy
7	FW	Ismail El-Aoud	1 July 2009 (aged 16)	(Royal Spanish Football Federation) Valencia
9	FW	Rami Lougmani	25 May 2009 (aged 16)	(Royal Belgian Football Association) Anderlecht
11	FW	Adam Boughazir	27 September 2009 (aged 16)	(Royal Moroccan Football Federation) Mohammed VI Academy
17	FW	Ibrahim Rabbaj	3 January 2009 (aged 17)	(The Football Association) Chelsea
19	FW	Adnan El-Boujjoufi	23 July 2009 (aged 16)	(Royal Dutch Football Association) Go Ahead Eagles

=== Tunisia ===
The final squad was announced on 9 May 2026.

Head coach: Mohamed Amine Naffati

No.	Pos.	Player	Date of birth (age)	Club
1	GK	Mohamed Daghrour	4 February 2009 (aged 17)	(French Football Federation) Sochaux
16	GK	Malek Araissi	1 March 2009 (aged 17)	(Tunisian Football Federation) Sfaxien
	GK	Mohamed Hammami	23 February 2009 (aged 17)	(Tunisian Football Federation) Tunis
2	DF	Mohamed Away	28 January 2009 (aged 17)	(Tunisian Football Federation) Sfaxien
3	DF	Naël Moussa	16 February 2009 (aged 17)	(French Football Federation) Dijon
4	DF	Rayan Taouriti	10 July 2009 (aged 16)	(Swiss Football Association) Lausanne
5	DF	Moncef Thabti	15 January 2009 (aged 17)	(German Football Association) Wolfsburg
12	DF	Sofiane Mlaouah	5 June 2010 (aged 15)	(French Football Federation) Nice
26	DF	Kays Ivanovitz	23 February 2009 (aged 17)	(French Football Federation) Aubagne
6	MF	Mohamed Othmani	9 February 2009 (aged 17)	(Tunisian Football Federation) Sahel
8	MF	Anas Trimech	29 March 2009 (aged 17)	(Tunisian Football Federation) Monastir
10	MF	Youssef Ben Said	28 June 2009 (aged 16)	(German Football Association) Hannover 96
15	MF	Nohan Parmentier	16 June 2009 (aged 16)	(French Football Federation) Aubagne
18	MF	Mohamed Abdelbaki	1 September 2010 (aged 15)	(Tunisian Football Federation) Club Africain
19	MF	Wassim Cherrad	29 March 2009 (aged 17)	(German Football Association) Wehen Wiesbaden
24	MF	Hedi Mezedri	10 September 2009 (aged 16)	(French Football Federation) Aubagne
25	MF	Youssef Ben Mahmoud	8 May 2009 (aged 17)	(French Football Federation) Concarneau
7	FW	Adem Borji	17 October 2009 (aged 16)	(Tunisian Football Federation) Tunis
9	FW	Islem Aloui	23 June 2009 (aged 16)	(Tunisian Football Federation) Tunis
14	FW	Yahia Jlidi	6 January 2009 (aged 17)	(French Football Federation) Angers
17	FW	Mohamed Hadrich	18 March 2009 (aged 17)	(Tunisian Football Federation) Sfaxien
20	FW	Ayhem Taboubi	4 May 2009 (aged 17)	(Tunisian Football Federation) Tunis
23	FW	Sofyane Zorgui	22 June 2009 (aged 16)	(French Football Federation) Vertou
	FW	Saïd Remadnia	27 March 2009 (aged 17)	(French Football Federation) Marseille
23	FW	Soufien Selmi	28 August 2009 (aged 16)	(German Football Association) Preußen Münster

== Group B ==
=== Cameroon ===
The final squad was announced on 13 May 2026.

Head coach: Alioum Saidou

No.	Pos.	Player	Date of birth (age)	Club
1	GK	Karl Kamla Tetcha	5 September 2010 (aged 15)	(Cameroonian Football Federation) Kadji Sports Academy
16	GK	Glory Kingue Missinga	24 February 2010 (aged 16)	(Cameroonian Football Federation) Talent D'or
21	GK	Bertrand Tchana Ange	14 December 2009 (aged 16)	(Cameroonian Football Federation) Africa Foot Academy
2	DF	Mbinde Esingila George	17 June 2009 (aged 16)	(Cameroonian Football Federation) Best Stars
3	DF	Franck Fobia Fomakwang	11 November 2009 (aged 16)	(Cameroonian Football Federation) Ecole de Football Brasseries du Cameroun
5	DF	Moussa Cherif Abbas	21 August 2010 (aged 15)	(Cameroonian Football Federation) Ecole de Football Brasseries du Cameroun
12	DF	Alyorami Evangilista Oumar	22 December 2009 (aged 16)	(Cameroonian Football Federation) Ecole de Football Brasseries du Cameroun
14	DF	Eric Rostand Bolo	30 June 2009 (aged 16)	(Cameroonian Football Federation) Mintack
22	DF	Yvan Bodo Bodo	17 May 2010 (aged 15)	(Cameroonian Football Federation) Tiouh Djitta Humanitarian Academy
4	MF	Abdoulraman Soudeisse	16 June 2009 (aged 16)	(Cameroonian Football Federation) Dauphine Academy
6	MF	Karel Krys	16 September 2009 (aged 16)	(Cameroonian Football Federation) Indomables
8	MF	Willy Sandion	12 January 2010 (aged 16)	(Cameroonian Football Federation) Young Talent
13	MF	Alan Mbida Mbida	6 June 2010 (aged 15)	(Cameroonian Football Federation) Royal Academy
15	MF	Ibrahim Djibril Inoussa	3 November 2009 (aged 16)	(Cameroonian Football Federation) Academy Foot de Douala
17	MF	Zaotsa Stanley	25 January 2009 (aged 17)	(Cameroonian Football Federation) Nal Palmers
7	FW	Michel Gabriel Mba	5 January 2010 (aged 16)	(Cameroonian Football Federation) APEJES Academy
9	FW	Arnold Massekon	2 January 2010 (aged 16)	(Cameroonian Football Federation) Best Stars
10	FW	Oumar Tsombeng	20 September 2010 (aged 15)	(Cameroonian Football Federation) Player
11	FW	Albert Nanji Munya	12 February 2011 (aged 15)	(Cameroonian Football Federation) Indomables
18	FW	Alain Traore	1 April 2010 (aged 16)	(Cameroonian Football Federation) Tiouh Djitta Humanitarian Academy
19	FW	Kada Priso Awoumou	19 February 2010 (aged 16)	(Cameroonian Football Federation) Kadji Sports Academy
20	FW	Rony Baliag	22 June 2010 (aged 15)	(Cameroonian Football Federation) Galactique
23	FW	Styve Azgban	14 June 2010 (aged 15)	(Cameroonian Football Federation) Dauphine Academy

=== DR Congo ===
The final squad was announced on 11 May 2026.

Head coach: Dénis Makenga

No.	Pos.	Player	Date of birth (age)	Club
1	GK	Ignace Sumbu		(Congolese Association Football Federation) Ceforbel
16	GK	Hugo Mambote		(Congolese Association Football Federation) Nouvelle Vie
21	GK	Fingu Phoba		(Congolese Association Football Federation) Sporting
5	DF	Sernat Atiso		(South African Football Association) Galaxy
7	DF	Ronel Makela		(Congolese Association Football Federation) RCG
15	DF	Issa Kidiaka		(Congolese Association Football Federation) Normand
17	DF	Sugar Mabanza		(Congolese Association Football Federation) Grovue
24	DF	Djessy Wunda		(Congolese Association Football Federation) Mini Kin
	DF	Benjamin Komba		(Congolese Association Football Federation) Aryeh
6	MF	Emery Bengele		(Congolese Association Football Federation) Maniema Union
8	MF	Evis Kasaka		(Congolese Association Football Federation) Ciamala
10	MF	Ortega Kabundi		(Congolese Association Football Federation) ELK 47
13	MF	John Elika		(Congolese Association Football Federation) Pantheres
18	MF	Pato Solomo		(Congolese Association Football Federation) St Damien
20	MF	Glody Mukaz		(Congolese Association Football Federation) Momkspor
2	FW	Prosper Tshikudi		(Congolese Association Football Federation) KFA
11	FW	Exaucé Titi		(Congolese Association Football Federation) Maniema Union
12	FW	Justin Kiliba		(Congolese Association Football Federation) Honore
14	FW	Miradi Mbombo		(Congolese Association Football Federation) Trinite
19	FW	Exaucé Luyindula		(Congolese Association Football Federation) Sarcelles
22	FW	Séraphin Mufwankolo		
	FW	Paoul Loko		(Congolese Association Football Federation) Sarcelles

=== Ivory Coast ===
The final squad was announced on 5 May 2026.

Head coach: Bassiriky Diabaté

No.	Pos.	Player	Date of birth (age)	Club
1	GK	Adama Diabaté		(Ivorian Football Federation) San Pédro
16	GK	Cheick Sarambe		(Ivorian Football Federation) Mimosas
23	GK	Ibrahim Tounkara		(Ivorian Football Federation) Abidjan
4	DF	Emmanuel Zoko		(Ivorian Football Federation) Stade d'Abidjan
5	DF	Koudougnon Drebo		(Ivorian Football Federation) Volcan
12	DF	Fousseni Bamba		(Ivorian Football Federation) Mimosas
13	DF	Alousseni Diakité		(Ivorian Football Federation) Empire
15	DF	Mory Doumbia		(Ivorian Football Federation) Yamoussoukro
18	DF	Zon Tie		(Ivorian Football Federation) Kessié
21	DF	Mohamed Fofana		(Ivorian Football Federation) WCA
2	MF	Abdoul Doumbia		(Ivorian Football Federation) SOA
3	MF	Hamza Coulibaly		(Ivorian Football Federation) JACA
6	MF	Youssouf Diabate		(Ivorian Football Federation) San Pédro
8	MF	Salia Traore		(Ivorian Football Federation) Africa Sports
11	MF	Landry Bazongo		(Ivorian Football Federation) Mimosas
20	MF	Souleymane Tuo		(Ivorian Football Federation) Bravo
7	FW	Songui Glao		(Ivorian Football Federation) Zoman
9	FW	Hubert Yao		(Ivorian Football Federation) San Pédro
10	FW	Ange Nomane		(Ivorian Football Federation) Yamoussoukro
14	FW	Boulaye Cisse		(Ivorian Football Federation) Empire
17	FW	Harafat Diabate		(Ivorian Football Federation) Abidjan
19	FW	Souleymane Kone		(Ivorian Football Federation) Abidjan
22	FW	Hassan Koné		(Ivorian Football Federation) San Pédro

=== Uganda ===
The final squad was announced on 2 May 2026.

Head coach: (Ghana) Laryea Kingston

No.	Pos.	Player	Date of birth (age)	Club
1	GK	Mubiru Geofrey		(Federation of Uganda Football Associations) Amus College School
18	GK	Adrian Mukwanga	25 May 2010 (aged 15)	(Federation of Uganda Football Associations) Vipers
19	GK	Ashraf Lukyamuzi	25 December 2009 (aged 16)	(Federation of Uganda Football Associations) Kyaddondo Secondary School
2	DF	Enoch Mwesigwa		(Federation of Uganda Football Associations) Volf Academy
3	DF	Eze Kombi		(Federation of Uganda Football Associations) Amus College School
4	DF	Ibrahim Waita		(Federation of Uganda Football Associations) Buddo Secondary School
5	DF	Brian Owino		(Federation of Uganda Football Associations) Vipers
13	DF	Travor Mubiru	15 July 2010 (aged 15)	(Federation of Uganda Football Associations) Vipers
22	DF	Musa Suuna		(Federation of Uganda Football Associations) Amus College School
23	DF	Ukasha Jemba		(Federation of Uganda Football Associations) Kampala Capital City Authority
25	DF	Mujjad Mbalire		(Federation of Uganda Football Associations) Masaka Secondary School
6	MF	Henry Muhoozi	12 July 2011 (aged 14)	(Federation of Uganda Football Associations) Amus College School
7	MF	Abdulshakur Babi		(Federation of Uganda Football Associations) Buddo Secondary School
8	MF	Thomas Ogema	27 May 2009 (aged 16)	(Federation of Uganda Football Associations) Kyaddondo Secondary School
14	MF	Reagan Lwanga		(Federation of Uganda Football Associations) Kibuli Secondary School
21	MF	Brian Olwa		(Federation of Uganda Football Associations) Edgars Youth Programme
26	MF	Yusuf Ssenyonga		(Federation of Uganda Football Associations) Bukedea Comprehensive School
10	FW	Owen Mukisa		(Federation of Uganda Football Associations) Vipers
11	FW	Ismail Fahad	16 November 2009 (aged 16)	(Federation of Uganda Football Associations) Kampala Capital City Authority
12	FW	Eric Isabirye		(Federation of Uganda Football Associations) Rays of Grace Academy
15	FW	Shakur Ngobi		(Federation of Uganda Football Associations) Green Light Islamic Secondary School
16	FW	Arafat Ibanda		(Federation of Uganda Football Associations) NEC
20	FW	Nicholas Kawooya		(Federation of Uganda Football Associations) Buddo Secondary School
24	FW	Edrine Kiddu		(Federation of Uganda Football Associations) Bukedea Comprehensive School
		Epila Emmanuel		(Federation of Uganda Football Associations) Mentors
		Inshirah Mahyoub		(Federation of Uganda Football Associations) Kibuli Secondary School
		Liam Karissa Kankaka		(The Football Association) Oxford United

== Group C ==
=== Angola ===
The final squad was announced on 3 May 2026.

Head coach: Mário Catala

No.	Pos.	Player	Date of birth (age)	Club
1	GK	Adilson José		(Angolan Football Federation) Academia de Futebol de Angola
12	GK	Gelson Dala	22 September 2009 (aged 16)	(Angolan Football Federation) Petróleos Luanda
22	GK	Paciência Coxe		(Angolan Football Federation) Petróleos Luanda
2	DF	Avelino Hossi		(Angolan Football Federation) Academia de Futebol de Angola
3	DF	Manuel Morais		(Angolan Football Federation) Petróleos Luanda
4	DF	Martinho Ginga		(Angolan Football Federation) Academia de Futebol de Angola
5	DF	Osvaldo Costa		(Angolan Football Federation) Academia de Futebol de Angola
13	DF	Alberto Dumbo		(Angolan Football Federation) Academia de Futebol de Angola
14	DF	Efraim Mpululu		(Angolan Football Federation) Petróleos Luanda
	DF	Kalanga Junior	11 July 2009 (aged 16)	(Angolan Football Federation) Petróleos Luanda
6	MF	Gabriel Silva		(Angolan Football Federation) Petróleos Luanda
8	MF	João Capitão	23 June 2009 (aged 16)	(Angolan Football Federation) Academia de Futebol de Angola
10	MF	Jairo Muanha	15 March 2009 (aged 17)	(Angolan Football Federation) Petróleos Luanda
15	MF	Pedro António		(Angolan Football Federation) Petróleos Luanda
16	MF	Vandro António		(Angolan Football Federation) Interclube
20	MF	Aimar Ferrão		(Angolan Football Federation) Academia de Futebol de Angola
23	MF	Fanilson Correia		(Angolan Football Federation) Academia de Futebol de Angola
7	FW	Edilásio Domingos	22 October 2009 (aged 16)	(Angolan Football Federation) Petróleos Luanda
9	FW	Emanuel Oficial	29 May 2009 (aged 16)	(Portuguese Football Federation) Oeiras
11	FW	Pedro Avelino	30 May 2009 (aged 16)	(Brazilian Football Confederation) Fortaleza
17	FW	Joel Manuel		(Angolan Football Federation) Petróleos Luanda
18	FW	Eliseu Francisco	7 February 2009 (aged 17)	(Angolan Football Federation) Primeiro de Agosto
19	FW	Victor Inaculo		(Angolan Football Federation) Interclube
21	FW	Sandro Ginina	8 October 2010 (aged 15)	(Angolan Football Federation) Primeiro de Agosto
	FW	Costantino Chianica		
	FW	Hugo Luvumbo	28 October 2009 (aged 16)	(Angolan Football Federation) Interclube

=== Mali ===
The final squad was announced on 2 May 2026.

Head coach: Demba Mamadou Traoré

No.	Pos.	Player	Date of birth (age)	Club
1	GK	Abdoul Coulibaly		(Malian Football Federation) Mali Coura
16	GK	Ibrahim Diarra		(Malian Football Federation) Étoile Sportive de Bamako
22	GK	Cheick Diarra		(Malian Football Federation) FC Diarra
2	DF	Mohamed Sidibé		(Malian Football Federation) Étoiles du Mandé
3	DF	Makan Sacko		(Malian Football Federation) Guidars FC
4	DF	Cheickna Coulibaly	15 January 2010 (aged 16)	(Malian Football Federation) Académie Football Cherifla
5	DF	Adama Kouyaté		(Malian Football Federation) Racing Club du Mali
12	DF	Youssif Sylla		(Malian Football Federation) Afrique Football Élite
13	DF	Cheick Mariko		(Malian Football Federation) Centre Boubacar Baba Diarra
15	DF	Salia Diarra		(Malian Football Federation) Africa Foot
6	MF	Abdoulaye Samaké		(Malian Football Federation) Étoiles du Mandé
7	MF	Halidou Maïga		(Malian Football Federation) Afrique Football Élite
8	MF	Amadou Doumbia		(Malian Football Federation) Yeelen Olympique
10	MF	Ismaël Kamissoko		(Malian Football Federation) Étoiles du Mandé
18	MF	Aboubacar Maïga		(Malian Football Federation) Africa Foot
24	MF	Sadou Touré		(Malian Football Federation) Binga FC
	MF	Famagnan Diallo		(Malian Football Federation) Derby FC
9	FW	Abdoulaye Touré		(Malian Football Federation) FC Béton Armé
11	FW	Mohamed Sogodogo		(Malian Football Federation) Mali Coura
14	FW	Ibrahim Diarra		(Malian Football Federation) Stade Malien
17	FW	Namory Coumaré		(Malian Football Federation) Guidars FC
19	FW	Fousseyni Sidibé		(Malian Football Federation) Centre Boubacar Baba Diarra
20	FW	Djigui Koïta		(Malian Football Federation) Guidars FC
21	FW	Daouda Traoré		(Malian Football Federation) Barô Diallo
25	FW	Alhousseyni Maïga		(Malian Football Federation) Revolution Foot D'Afrique

=== Mozambique ===
The final squad was announced on 30 April 2026.

Head coach: (Portugal) Luís Guerreiro

No.	Pos.	Player	Date of birth (age)	Club
1	GK	João Jofrisse		(Mozambican Football Federation) Costa do Sol
12	GK	Justino Tanque		(Mozambican Football Federation) Black Bulls
	GK	Nelson Suatera		(Mozambican Football Federation) Black Bulls
2	DF	Pires Vieira		(Mozambican Football Federation) Black Bulls
3	DF	Ricardo dos Santos	12 July 2011 (aged 14)	(Portuguese Football Federation) Famalicão
4	DF	Nelton Picardo		(Mozambican Football Federation) Black Bulls
14	DF	Shelton Sitoe		(Mozambican Football Federation) Costa do Sol
17	DF	Pascoal Demi		(Mozambican Football Federation) Black Bulls
19	DF	Floresnaldo Matias		(Mozambican Football Federation) Ferroviário de Nampula
5	MF	Jonas Matusse		(Mozambican Football Federation) Black Bulls
6	MF	Joel Catamo		(Mozambican Football Federation) Black Bulls
7	MF	Steys José		(Mozambican Football Federation) Ferroviário de Nampula
8	MF	Valentim Pacane		(Mozambican Football Federation) Costa do Sol
10	MF	Chausson Nhabanga		(Mozambican Football Federation) Black Bulls
13	MF	Júlio Júnior		(Mozambican Football Federation) Black Bulls
15	MF	Diego Pelembe		(Mozambican Football Federation) Black Bulls
18	MF	Joaquim Mubaí		(Mozambican Football Federation) Costa do Sol
20	MF	Allan de Figueiredo		(Mozambican Football Federation) Black Bulls
9	FW	Marcos Jorge		(Mozambican Football Federation) Costa do Sol
11	FW	António Nhampule	6 January 2009 (aged 17)	(German Football Association) Eintracht Frankfurt
16	FW	Charif Carlos		(Mozambican Football Federation) LD Maputo
21	FW	Jayden Namali		(Mozambican Football Federation) Black Bulls
23	FW	Eros Monteiro	15 January 2009 (aged 17)	(Royal Spanish Football Federation) Alcorcón
	FW	Thiago Hernandez		(Mozambican Football Federation) Mosquito

=== Tanzania ===
The final squad was announced on 3 May 2026.

Head coach: Elieneza Nsanganzelu

No.	Pos.	Player	Date of birth (age)	Club
1	GK	Rajabu Manyelezi		(Tanzania Football Federation) Azam
13	GK	Abrahman Nassoro	21 June 2009 (aged 16)	(Tanzania Football Federation) Azam
18	GK	Haji Ally		(Tanzania Football Federation) Talent Development Scheme
3	DF	Kassim Juma	20 June 2009 (aged 16)	(Tanzania Football Federation) Talent Development Scheme
5	DF	Hussein Mbegu	11 June 2010 (aged 15)	(Tanzania Football Federation) Simba
6	DF	Sultan Shamba		(Tanzania Football Federation) Talent Development Scheme
12	DF	Erick Yusuph	15 November 2010 (aged 15)	(Tanzania Football Federation) Talent Development Scheme
14	DF	Idrisa Kilendemo	25 May 2009 (aged 16)	(Tanzania Football Federation) Talent Development Scheme
23	DF	Abdul Issa		(Tanzania Football Federation) Talent Development Scheme
2	MF	Hassan Mkindai		(Tanzania Football Federation) Talent Development Scheme
7	MF	George Mzungu		(Tanzania Football Federation) Young Africans
8	MF	Issa Chole	5 May 2010 (aged 16)	(Tanzania Football Federation) Fountain Gate
10	MF	Luqman Mbalasalu		(Tanzania Football Federation) Kagera Sugar
11	MF	Razaki Mbegelendi	7 July 2009 (aged 16)	(Tanzania Football Federation) Talent Development Scheme
15	MF	Dismas Athanasi	26 December 2011 (aged 14)	(Tanzania Football Federation) Talent Development Scheme
16	MF	Ismail Likungilo	17 January 2010 (aged 16)	(Tanzania Football Federation) Azam
17	MF	Hamis Chenga	10 May 2009 (aged 17)	(Tanzania Football Federation) Talent Development Scheme
20	MF	Hasani Kizinga	30 December 2009 (aged 16)	(Tanzania Football Federation) Talent Development Scheme
22	MF	Soann Shabani		(French Football Federation) Grenoble Foot 38
24	MF	Hamisi Barua		(Tanzania Football Federation) Talent Development Scheme
19	FW	Sadam Hamis		(Tanzania Football Federation) Talent Development Scheme
		Omary Juma Yahaya		(Tanzania Football Federation) Young Africans
		Abbas Said Nasser		(Tanzania Football Federation) African Sports
		Nhingo Juma Luzelenga	17 August 2009 (aged 16)	(Tanzania Football Federation) Talent Development Scheme

== Group D ==
=== Algeria ===
The final squad was announced on 7 May 2026.

Head coach: Amine Ghimouz

No.	Pos.	Player	Date of birth (age)	Club
16	GK	Nazim Benmedjdoub	3 April 2009 (aged 17)	(Algerian Football Federation) Paradou AC
23	GK	Yazid Tifrani	25 February 2009 (aged 17)	(French Football Federation) Strasbourg
	GK	Nazim Benkaidia	25 March 2009 (aged 17)	(Algerian Football Federation) CS Constantine
2	DF	Ayoub Dahmas		(Algerian Football Federation) USM Alger
3	DF	Anas Belkanichi	16 April 2009 (aged 17)	(French Football Federation) Toulouse
4	DF	Mahmoud Noubli	28 February 2009 (aged 17)	(Algerian Football Federation) Paradou AC
5	DF	Yanis Messaoudi	17 February 2009 (aged 17)	(Italian Football Federation) AC Milan
12	DF	Ilyes Mekkaoui	15 June 2009 (aged 16)	(Royal Dutch Football Association) Volendam
13	DF	Yasser Bouhadjela		(Algerian Football Federation) Olympique Akbou
15	DF	Noam Benramdane	1 February 2009 (aged 17)	(French Football Federation) Montpellier
17	DF	Ayoub Bouacida	18 March 2009 (aged 17)	(Algerian Football Federation) ES Sétif
6	MF	Ali Sadji	23 March 2009 (aged 17)	(Algerian Football Federation) JS Kabylie
8	MF	Walid Nechab	24 March 2009 (aged 17)	(French Football Federation) Olympique Lyonnais
10	MF	Bilal Daaou	27 August 2009 (aged 16)	(German Football Association) Eintracht Frankfurt
19	MF	Adam Benali	4 January 2009 (aged 17)	(French Football Federation) Le Havre
20	MF	Nazim Benghezel	13 January 2009 (aged 17)	(French Football Federation) Amiens
21	MF	Ilian Refsi	1 January 2009 (aged 17)	(French Football Federation) Paris
22	MF	Abderrahmane Zaoui	25 October 2009 (aged 16)	(Algerian Football Federation) MC Mekhadma
26	MF	Rayane Zidane	14 April 2009 (aged 17)	(German Football Association) Bayer Leverkusen
7	FW	Yacine Abed	6 January 2010 (aged 16)	(Algerian Football Federation) Paradou AC
9	FW	Mouhammed Valmy	29 November 2009 (aged 16)	(French Football Federation) Stade Rennais
11	FW	Khalil Touali		(Algerian Football Federation) Olympique Akbou
14	FW	Melwane Zaidi	19 June 2009 (aged 16)	(Swiss Football Association) Basel
18	FW	Ilyas Grini	3 August 2009 (aged 16)	(French Football Federation) Lens
25	FW	Mahdi Maghlout	3 May 2009 (aged 17)	(Italian Football Federation) Inter Milan
	FW	Tahar Akbache		(Algerian Football Federation) USM Alger

=== Ghana ===
The final squad was announced on 7 May 2026.

Head coach: Prosper Narteh Ogum

No.	Pos.	Player	Date of birth (age)	Club
1	GK	Michael Armah		
16	GK	Solomon Kesse		
22	GK	John Annan		
4	DF	Nicholas Essuman		
13	DF	Mujahid Osman		
14	DF	Gabriel Denyinah		
15	DF	Issah Rafiu		
18	DF	Kingsley Fosu		
24	DF	Essau Atsu Kpoeti		
25	DF	Jacob Etse Kpoeti		
2	MF	Michael Nyantakyi		
3	MF	Isaac Barfo		
5	MF	Augustine Appiah		
8	MF	Eric Adu Gyamfi		
20	MF	Michael Awuli		
23	MF	Mark Kagawa Mensah	13 June 2009 (aged 16)	
9	FW	David Ofori	24 June 2009 (aged 16)	
10	FW	Joseph Narbi		
11	FW	Mark Aboagye		
17	FW	Gavi Robinho Yao		
19	FW	Clement Agyei		
21	FW	Latif Abdul Wunzalgu		

=== Senegal ===
The final squad was announced on 4 May 2026.

Head coach: Lamine Sané

No.	Pos.	Player	Date of birth (age)	Club
16	GK	Assane Sarr	10 July 2010 (aged 15)	(Senegalese Football Federation) Ndangane
21	GK	Daouda Alassane Ba	13 February 2009 (aged 17)	(Senegalese Football Federation) Génération Foot
	GK	Mamadou Diabaté Gueye	20 July 2009 (aged 16)	(Senegalese Football Federation) Diambars
2	DF	Lamine Mbengue	7 August 2009 (aged 16)	(Senegalese Football Federation) Génération Foot
3	DF	Ahmadou Bamba Kane	7 November 2009 (aged 16)	(Senegalese Football Federation) Diambars
4	DF	Cheikh Thior		(Senegalese Football Federation) Oslo Football Académie
12	DF	Abdourahmane Dieye		(Senegalese Football Federation) Keur Madior
15	DF	Thierno Sow		(Senegalese Football Federation) United Académie
18	DF	Cheikh Tidiane Diallo		(Senegalese Football Federation) United Académie
22	DF	Cheikh Dieng	7 March 2009 (aged 17)	(Senegalese Football Federation) Diambars
5	MF	Emile Niaga Sadio		(Senegalese Football Federation) Essamaye
6	MF	Maurice Biaye	14 January 2009 (aged 17)	(Senegalese Football Federation) Darou Salam
8	MF	Mahamet Ba		(Senegalese Football Federation) Diambars
10	MF	Souleymane Commissaire Faye		(Senegalese Football Federation) BE Sport
13	MF	El Hadji Ibrahima Sow	12 December 2009 (aged 16)	(Senegalese Football Federation) Dakar Sacré-Cœur
20	MF	Sébastien Nogueira	12 January 2009 (aged 17)	(Senegalese Football Federation) Génération Foot
7	FW	Sega Fall Mbodji	27 November 2009 (aged 16)	(Senegalese Football Federation) Génération Foot
9	FW	Ibrahima Dione	3 August 2009 (aged 16)	(Senegalese Football Federation) HLM Dakar
11	FW	Mouhamed Wagne	5 January 2009 (aged 17)	(Senegalese Football Federation) Diambars
14	FW	Abdoulaye Diop		(Senegalese Football Federation) Académie Mawade Wade
17	FW	Magueye Niang		(Senegalese Football Federation) Guelwaars
19	FW	Daouda Fofana		(Senegalese Football Federation) Génération Foot
23	FW	Cheikh Omar Sy		(Senegalese Football Federation) Castor

=== South Africa ===
The final squad was announced on 8 May 2026.

Head coach: Vela Khumalo

No.	Pos.	Player	Date of birth (age)	Club
1	GK	Lwandiso Radebe	25 March 2009 (aged 17)	(South African Football Association) Mamelodi Sundowns
16	GK	Ethan Garcia		(South African Football Association) Mamelodi Sundowns
20	GK	Keabetswe Morake	19 January 2009 (aged 17)	(South African Football Association) Kaizer Chiefs
2	DF	Lutho Makunga		(South African Football Association) Kaizer Chiefs
3	DF	Neo Mangcaka		(South African Football Association) Ubuntu Academy
5	DF	Zazi Qotoyi		(South African Football Association) Cape Town City
8	DF	Reotshepile Malete		(South African Football Association) Kaizer Chiefs
13	DF	Tumelo Moerane		(South African Football Association) Kaizer Chiefs
15	DF	Tristan O'Malley	2 March 2009 (aged 17)	(South African Football Association) Orlando Pirates
19	DF	Braythen Moffitt		(South African Football Association) Kaizer Chiefs
21	DF	Tashiel Rugunanan		(South African Football Association) Kaizer Chiefs
4	MF	Aphelele Majola		(South African Football Association) Mamelodi Sundowns
6	MF	Jesse Gewer		(South African Football Association) Kaizer Chiefs
11	MF	Jaylen Potgieter	12 February 2010 (aged 16)	(German Football Association) Köln
17	MF	Inganathi Simama		(South African Football Association) Mamelodi Sundowns
7	FW	Omphemetse Sekgoto	11 March 2010 (aged 16)	(South African Football Association) Mamelodi Sundowns
9	FW	Ntokozo Madondo		(South African Football Association) Mamelodi Sundowns
10	FW	Mpho Molepo		(South African Football Association) Mamelodi Sundowns
12	FW	Siyabonga Mbongo		(South African Football Association) Mamelodi Sundowns
14	FW	Samkelo Mkhonto		(South African Football Association) Galaxy
18	FW	Obama Mhlongo	5 January 2009 (aged 17)	(South African Football Association) AmaZulu
