= UNIFFAC Cup =

U-17 UNIFFAC Cup
- Organiser(s): UNIFFAC
- Founded: 2008
- Region: Central Africa
- Teams: 8
- 2020 UNIFFAC Cup

The U-17 UNIFFAC Cup is an association football competition contested by the under-17 national teams of Football Associations, associated with the Central African Football Federations' Union (UNIFFAC).

== Results ==
Year	Host	Final			Third Place Match		
Year	Host	Winner	Score	Runner-up	3rd Place	Score	4th Place
2008; Details	(Cameroon) Limbé	Cameroon	2-1	(Democratic Republic of the Congo); DR Congo			
2009; Details	(Cameroon) Limbé	Central African Republic	2-1	Gabon	Chad	Round-robin	Cameroon
2011; Details	(Chad) N'Djamena	Chad	2-1	Cameroon			
2018; Details	(Equatorial Guinea) Bata and Malobo	Cameroon	3-1	(Republic of the Congo); Congo	Equatorial Guinea	2–1	Central African Republic
2020; Details		cancelled by CAF due to the absence of a host country					
2023; Details	(Cameroon) Limbé	Cameroon	Round-robin	(Republic of the Congo); Congo	Central African Republic	Round-robin	
2025; Details	(Cameroon) Douala	Cameroon	Round-robin	Central African Republic	DR Congo	Round-robin	Gabon
2026; Details	(Democratic Republic of the Congo) Kinshasa	Cameroon	Round-robin	DR Congo	Gabon	Round-robin	Central African Republic
