= 2026 U-17 Africa Cup of Nations qualification =

Tournament details
- Host countries: Libya (North Zone); Mali (West A Zone); Ivory Coast (West B Zone); DR Congo (Central Zone); Ethiopia (Central-East Zone); Zimbabwe (South Zone)
- Dates: 11 September 2025 – 5 April 2026
- Teams: 48

Tournament statistics
- Matches played: 35
- Goals scored: 109 (3.11 per match)

The 2026 U-17 Africa Cup of Nations qualification is a men's under-17 football competition that decided the participating teams of the 2026 U-17 Africa Cup of Nations.

Players born on 1 January 2009 or later were eligible to participate in the competition. The host country for the final stage of the edition is Morocco, appointed during the annual CAF Executive Committee meeting along the 2024 CAF Awards ceremony in Marrakesh, Morocco where CAF appointed the country as host.

== Teams ==
Zone	Spots	Teams entering qualification	Did not enter
North Zone (UNAF)	4 spots	**Algeria**; **Egypt**; Libya; **Morocco**; **Tunisia**	
West A Zone (WAFU-UFOA A)	2 spots	Gambia; Guinea; Guinea-Bissau; Liberia; **Mali**; Mauritania; **Senegal**; Sierra Leone	Cape Verde
West B Zone (WAFU-UFOA B)	2 spots	Benin; Burkina Faso; **Ghana**; **Ivory Coast**; Niger; Nigeria; Togo	
Central Zone (UNIFFAC)	2 spots	**Cameroon**; Central African Republic; ~~Congo~~ **(W)**; **DR Congo**; Gabon; ~~Equatorial Guinea~~ **(W)**	Chad; São Tomé and Príncipe
Central-East Zone (CECAFA)	3 spots	Burundi; Djibouti; **Ethiopia**; Kenya; Rwanda; Somalia; South Sudan; Sudan; **Tanzania**; **Uganda**	Eritrea
South Zone (COSAFA)	3 spots	**Angola**; Botswana; Comoros; Eswatini; Lesotho; Madagascar; Malawi; Mauritius; **Mozambique**; **South Africa**; Zambia; Zimbabwe	Namibia; Seychelles

Notes

- Teams in **bold** qualified for the final tournament.
- (W): Withdrew after draw

== North Zone ==
Pos	Team	Pld	W	D	L	GF	GA	GD	Pts	Qualification
1	Morocco	4	4	0	0	10	2	+8	12	Final tournament as the host nation
2	Algeria	4	2	1	1	7	5	+2	7	Final tournament
3	Egypt	4	2	0	2	4	4	0	6	Final tournament
4	Tunisia	4	1	1	2	3	5	−2	4	Final tournament
5	Libya (H)	4	0	0	4	4	12	−8	0	

Source: UNAF
Rules for classification: 1) Points; 2) Goal difference; 3) Goals scored
(H) Hosts

== West A Zone ==
The WAFU-UFOA Zone A qualifiers for the U-17 Africa Cup of Nations will be hosted by Mali with the matches played starting 5 October 2025. The matches will be played at Bamako, Mali.

All times are local, GMT (UTC+0).

=== Group stage ===
The eight teams were drawn into two groups of four teams. The winners and the runners-up of each group advanced to the semi-finals.

==== Tiebreakers ====
Teams were ranked according to the three points for a win system (3 points for a win, 1 for a draw, 0 points for a loss), and if two teams were tied on points, the following tiebreaking criteria were applied, in the order given, to determine the rankings (Regulations Article 13):

1. Points in head-to-head matches match between the two tied teams;
2. Goal difference in all group matches;
3. Goals scored in all group matches;
4. Drawing of lots.

If more than two teams were tied, the following criteria were applied instead:

1. Points in matches between the tied teams;
2. Goal difference in matches between the tied teams;
3. Goals scored in matches between the tied teams;
4. If after applying all criteria above, two teams were still tied, the above criteria were again applied to matches played between the two teams in question. If this did not resolve the tie, the next three criteria were applied;
5. Goal difference in all group matches;
6. Goals scored in all group matches;
7. Drawing of lots.

==== Group A ====
Pos	Team	Pld	W	D	L	GF	GA	GD	Pts	Qualification
1	Guinea-Bissau	3	2	1	0	7	2	+5	7	Semi-finals
2	Mali (H)	3	1	2	0	9	3	+6	5	Semi-finals
3	Gambia	3	1	1	1	6	4	+2	4	
4	Liberia	3	0	0	3	1	14	−13	0	

Source: WAFU A
Rules for classification: Group stage tiebreakers
(H) Hosts
5 October 2025
16:00

Mali	6–0	Liberia
Touré 11' (pen.), 24'; Kamissoko 20'; F. Sidibé 87'; Keïta 90+2', 90+4'	Report

Stade Mamadou Konaté, Bamako
5 October 2025
19:00

Gambia	0–2	Guinea-Bissau
	Report	J. Balde 30', 78'

Stade Mamadou Konaté, Bamako

8 October 2025
16:00

Liberia	0–4	Gambia
	Report	Kanyi 1'; Leigh 38'; Drammeh 61' (pen.); Loum 90+2'

Koulikoro Stadium, Koulikoro
8 October 2025
19:00

Guinea-Bissau	1–1	Mali
J. Balde 60'	Report	S. Diarra 90+2'

Koulikoro Stadium, Koulikoro

11 October 2025
16:00

Mali	2–2	Gambia
Touré 72' (pen.); Maïga 81'	Report	L. Bojang 50'; Leigh 85'

Stade Mamadou Konaté, Bamako
11 October 2025
16:00

Guinea-Bissau	4–1	Liberia
Biai 57' (pen.); Bassague 69', 78'; Dabo 90+2'	Report	Hyne 6'

Ouezzin-Coulibaly Stadium, Bamako

==== Group B ====
Pos	Team	Pld	W	D	L	GF	GA	GD	Pts	Qualification
1	Guinea	3	2	1	0	5	2	+3	7	Semi-finals
2	Senegal	3	1	2	0	3	2	+1	5	Semi-finals
3	Mauritania	3	1	0	2	2	3	−1	3	
4	Sierra Leone	3	0	1	2	3	6	−3	1	

Source: WAFU A
Rules for classification: Group stage tiebreakers
6 October 2025
16:00

Senegal	1–1	Sierra Leone
Faye 53'	Report	Samura 11'

Ouezzin-Coulibaly Stadium, Bamako
6 October 2025
19:00

Mauritania	0–1	Guinea
	Report	M. Sylla 52'

Ouezzin-Coulibaly Stadium, Bamako

9 October 2025
16:00

Sierra Leone	1–2	Mauritania
Kanja 74' (pen.)	Report	Mhaimid 70'; El Ide 82'

Ouezzin-Coulibaly Stadium, Bamako
9 October 2025
19:00

Guinea	1–1	Senegal
S. Sylla 88'	Report	Dione 7'

Ouezzin-Coulibaly Stadium, Bamako

12 October 2025
15:00

Senegal	1–0	Mauritania
Diallo 47'	Report

Stade Mamadou Konaté, Bamako
12 October 2025
15:00

Guinea	3–1	Sierra Leone
Cissé 19'; Sano 34', 70'	Report	Sidibay 10'

Ouezzin-Coulibaly Stadium, Bamako

=== Knockout stage ===
==== Bracket ====
Semi-finals
15 October – Bamako
Guinea-Bissau	0
Senegal	4
15 October – Bamako
Guinea	1
Mali	2

Final
18 October – Bamako
Senegal	2
Mali	0
Third place
18 October – Bamako
Guinea-Bissau (p)	1 (4)
Guinea	1 (2)

==== Semi-finals ====
Winners qualified for 2026 U-17 Africa Cup of Nations.

15 October 2025
16:00

Guinea-Bissau	0–4	Senegal
	Report	Ndiaye 34'; Faye 43'; Niang 50'; Ba 90+5'

Stade Mamadou Konaté, Bamako
Referee: Baboucarr Bass (Gambia)

15 October 2025
19:00

Guinea	1–2	Mali
S. Sylla 4'	Report	Sogodogo 45+2'; Kamissoko 85'

Stade Mamadou Konaté, Bamako
Referee: Abdelkader M'Bareck (Mauritania)

==== Third place play-off ====
18 October 2025
16:00

Guinea-Bissau	1–1	Guinea
Ravi Ca 57'	Report	Sano 63' (pen.)
Penalties
Bassague (penalty scored); Ravi Ca (penalty scored); Danfa (penalty scored); Biai (penalty scored)	4–2	(penalty scored) S. Sylla; (penalty missed) Sano; (penalty scored) Chérif; (penalty missed) Bayo

Stade Mamadou Konaté, Bamako
Referee: Aida Sy (Senegal)

==== Final ====
18 October 2025
19:00

Senegal	2–0	Mali
Faye 40', 50'	Report

Stade Mamadou Konaté, Bamako
Referee: Sulaiman Kamara (Sierra Leone)

== West B Zone ==
The WAFU-UFOA Zone B qualifiers for the U-17 Africa Cup of Nations will be hosted by Ivory Coast with the matches played between 20 September and 3 October 2025, the draw was announced on 4 September 2025.

All times are local, GMT (UTC±0).

=== Group stage ===
The seven teams were drawn into two groups of three and four teams. The winners and the runners-up of each group advanced to the semi-finals.

==== Tiebreakers ====
Teams were ranked according to the three points for a win system (3 points for a win, 1 for a draw, 0 points for a loss), and if two teams were tied on points, the following tiebreaking criteria were applied, in the order given, to determine the rankings (Regulations Article 13):

1. Points in head-to-head matches match between the two tied teams;
2. Goal difference in all group matches;
3. Goals scored in all group matches;
4. Drawing of lots.

If more than two teams were tied, the following criteria were applied instead:

1. Points in matches between the tied teams;
2. Goal difference in matches between the tied teams;
3. Goals scored in matches between the tied teams;
4. If after applying all criteria above, two teams were still tied, the above criteria were again applied to matches played between the two teams in question. If this did not resolve the tie, the next three criteria were applied;
5. Goal difference in all group matches;
6. Goals scored in all group matches;
7. Drawing of lots.

==== Group A ====
Pos	Team	Pld	W	D	L	GF	GA	GD	Pts	Qualification
1	Ivory Coast (H)	3	2	1	0	6	1	+5	7	Semi-finals
2	Ghana	3	1	1	1	4	5	−1	4	Semi-finals
3	Niger	3	1	0	2	4	6	−2	3	
4	Togo	3	0	2	1	3	5	−2	2	

Source: WAFU
Rules for classification: Group stage tiebreakers
(H) Hosts
20 September 2025
15:00

Ivory Coast	2–0	Niger
Bamba 73'; Doumbia 90+3'

Charles Konan Banny Stadium, Yamoussoukro
Referee: Hamidou Diero (Burkina Faso)
20 September 2025
18:00

Togo	1–1	Ghana
Ganiou 63' (pen.)	Report (GFA)	Narbi 9'

Charles Konan Banny Stadium, Yamoussoukro

23 September 2025
15:00

Niger	3–1	Togo
Touba 42'; Moctar 44', 50'	Report (FTF)	Amega 3'

Stade Lycée Scientifique, Yamoussoukro
23 September 2025
18:00

Ghana	0–3	Ivory Coast
	Report (GFA)	Doumbia 3'; Hubert 48'; Bamba 59'

Charles Konan Banny Stadium, Yamoussoukro

26 September 2025
15:00

Ivory Coast	1–1	Togo
Ar. Diabaté 64'	Report (FTF)	Amega 90+3'

Stade Lycée Scientifique, Yamoussoukro
26 September 2025
15:00

Ghana	3–1	Niger
Gavi 2', 90+1'; Mensah 82'	Report (GFA)	Arbi 7'

Charles Konan Banny Stadium, Yamoussoukro

==== Group B ====
Pos	Team	Pld	W	D	L	GF	GA	GD	Pts	Qualification
1	Nigeria	2	1	1	0	4	1	+3	4	Semi-finals
2	Burkina Faso	2	1	1	0	1	0	+1	4	Semi-finals
3	Benin	2	0	0	2	1	5	−4	0	

Source: WAFU
Rules for classification: Group stage tiebreakers
21 September 2025
15:00

Burkina Faso	1–0	Benin
Koné 49'

Stade Lycée Scientifique, Yamoussoukro
Referee: Mohamed El Baroudi (Morocco)

24 September 2025
15:00

Benin	1–4	Nigeria
Zannou 45'		Agha 4' (pen.), 14', 31'; Edeh 6'

Stade Lycée Scientifique, Yamoussoukro

27 September 2025
15:00

Nigeria	0–0	Burkina Faso

Stade Lycée Scientifique, Yamoussoukro

=== Knockout stage ===
==== Bracket ====
Semi-finals
30 September – Yamoussoukro
Ivory Coast	2
Burkina Faso	1
30 September – Yamoussoukro
Nigeria	0
Ghana	2

Final
3 October – Yamoussoukro
Ivory Coast (p)	0 (4)
Ghana	0 (3)
Third place
3 October – Yamoussoukro
Burkina Faso	0
Nigeria	2

==== Semi-finals ====
Winners qualified for 2026 U-17 Africa Cup of Nations.

30 September 2025
15:00

Ivory Coast	2–1	Burkina Faso
Tuo 40'; Doumbia 58'		Diakité 25'

Charles Konan Banny Stadium, Yamoussoukro
Referee: Mohamed El Baroudi (Morocco)

30 September 2025
19:00

Nigeria	0–2	Ghana
	Report (GFA)	Awuli 21'; Gavi 31'

Charles Konan Banny Stadium, Yamoussoukro
Referee: Kossi Fabrice Senyo (Togo)

==== Third place play-off ====
3 October 2025
15:00

Burkina Faso	0–2	Nigeria
		Yusuf 50'; Umole 77'

Stade Lycée Scientifique, Yamoussoukro
Referee: Hugues Modeste Kokora (Ivory Coast)

==== Final ====
3 October 2025
19:00

Ivory Coast	0–0	Ghana
Penalties
Penalty scored Penalty missed	4–3	Penalty scored Penalty missed

Charles Konan Banny Stadium, Yamoussoukro
Referee: Kossi Fabrice Senyo (Togo)

== Central Zone ==
The UNIFFAC qualifiers for the U-17 Africa Cup of Nations will be held in the Democratic Republic of the Congo between 18–23 February 2026. The qualifying tournament draw was held on 4 February 2026. Six UNIFFAC members were originally going to compete in a single round-robin format with the top two teams qualifying for the final tournament. However, on 16 February, Congo withdrew from the competition due to a number of players being deemed overage by the MRI tests, on 18 February, Equatorial Guinea also withdrew for the same reasons.

The four remaining teams were then placed in one group with the winners and the runners-up qualifying for the final tournament.

=== Tiebreakers ===
Teams were ranked according to the three points for a win system (3 points for a win, 1 for a draw, 0 points for a loss), and if two teams were tied on points, the following tiebreaking criteria were applied, in the order given, to determine the rankings (Regulations Article 13):

1. Points in head-to-head matches match between the two tied teams;
2. Goal difference in all group matches;
3. Goals scored in all group matches;
4. Drawing of lots.

If more than two teams were tied, the following criteria were applied instead:

1. Points in matches between the tied teams;
2. Goal difference in matches between the tied teams;
3. Goals scored in matches between the tied teams;
4. If after applying all criteria above, two teams were still tied, the above criteria were again applied to matches played between the two teams in question. If this did not resolve the tie, the next three criteria were applied;
5. Goal difference in all group matches;
6. Goals scored in all group matches;
7. Drawing of lots.

=== Results ===
Pos	Team	Pld	W	D	L	GF	GA	GD	Pts	Qualification
1	Cameroon	3	3	0	0	9	1	+8	9	2026 U-17 Africa Cup of Nations
2	DR Congo (H)	3	2	0	1	5	4	+1	6	2026 U-17 Africa Cup of Nations
3	Gabon	3	1	0	2	5	8	−3	3	
4	Central African Republic	3	0	0	3	1	7	−6	0	

Source: Uniffac
Rules for classification: Group stage tiebreakers
(H) Hosts
18 February 2026
16:00

Cameroon	5–1	Gabon

Stade Tata Raphaël, Kinshasa
Referee: Ruth Nandaiz Bilembi (Congo)
18 February 2026
13:00

Gabon	1–3	DR Congo

Stade Tata Raphaël, Kinshasa
Referee: Aimé Landry Belly de Sombozo (Central African Republic)

21 February 2026
16:00

Central African Republic	0–2	Cameroon

Stade Tata Raphaël, Kinshasa
Referee: Gerson Esono Angono (Equatorial Guinea)
21 February 2026
16:00

DR Congo	2–1	Central African Republic

Stade Tata Raphaël, Kinshasa
Referee: Yanick Fodouop (Cameroon)

27 February 2026
13:00

Central African Republic	0–3	Gabon

Stade Tata Raphaël, Kinshasa
Referee: Lambert Museka (DR Congo)
27 February 2026
16:00

DR Congo	0–2	Cameroon

Stade Tata Raphaël, Kinshasa
Referee: Ruth Nandaiz Bilembi (Congo)

== Central-East Zone ==
=== Group stage ===
==== Group A ====
Pos	Team	Pld	W	D	L	GF	GA	GD	Pts	Qualification
1	Ethiopia (H)	4	3	1	0	10	4	+6	10	Semi-finals
2	Kenya	4	2	1	1	5	3	+2	7	Semi-finals
3	Somalia	4	1	3	0	9	6	+3	6	
4	South Sudan	4	1	1	2	5	9	−4	4	
5	Rwanda	4	0	0	4	2	9	−7	0	

Source: CECAFA
Rules for classification: 1) Points; 2) head-to-head matches; 3) Goal difference; 4) Number of goals scored.
(H) Hosts
15 November 2025
13:00

Somalia	2–2	South Sudan
An. Mohamed 44'; Yusuf 90+3'	Report	David 75'; Juo 88'

Abebe Bikila Stadium, Addis Ababa
15 November 2025
16:00

Rwanda	0–2	Ethiopia
	Report	Kassaw 31'; Shafi 34'

Abebe Bikila Stadium, Addis Ababa

18 November 2025
13:00

South Sudan	1–4	Ethiopia
Juo 78' (pen.)	Report	Kassaw 13', 17', 52'; Seleshi 56'

Abebe Bikila Stadium, Addis Ababa
Referee: Ismael Said Abdillahi (Djibouti)
18 November 2025
16:00

Somalia	1–1	Kenya
An. Mohamed 55'	Report	Ochieng 31'

Abebe Bikila Stadium, Addis Ababa
Referee: Amro Mohammed (Sudan)

21 November 2025
13:00

Kenya	2–1	Rwanda
Ochola 69'; Nasasiro 77'	Report	Nshimiyimana 37'

Abebe Bikila Stadium, Addis Ababa
21 November 2025
16:00

Ethiopia	3–3	Somalia
Kassaw 40', 52' (pen.); Alemayehu 85'	Report	Omar 36', 87'; Yusuf 90+2'

Abebe Bikila Stadium, Addis Ababa

24 November 2025
13:00

Rwanda	0–3	Somalia
	Report	Osman 59', 84'; Abdulahi 86'

Abebe Bikila Stadium, Addis Ababa
24 November 2025
16:00

Kenya	2–0	South Sudan
Wanyonyi 12'; Nasasiro 89'	Report

Abebe Bikila Stadium, Addis Ababa

26 November 2025
13:00

South Sudan	2–1	Rwanda
Lombe 20'; Juo 69'	Report	Nshimiyimana 54'

Abebe Bikila Stadium, Addis Ababa
26 November 2025
16:00

Ethiopia	1–0	Kenya
Kassaw 65'	Report

Abebe Bikila Stadium, Addis Ababa

==== Group B ====
Pos	Team	Pld	W	D	L	GF	GA	GD	Pts	Qualification
1	Tanzania	4	4	0	0	24	1	+23	12	Semi-finals
2	Uganda	4	3	0	1	20	2	+18	9	Semi-finals
3	Sudan	4	2	0	2	4	16	−12	6	
4	Burundi	4	1	0	3	1	10	−9	3	
5	Djibouti	4	0	0	4	1	21	−20	0	

Source: CECAFA
Rules for classification: 1) Points; 2) head-to-head matches; 3) Goal difference; 4) Number of goals scored.
15 November 2025
17:00

Tanzania	6–0	Sudan
Athanasi 10', 16'; Luzelenga 21'; Juma 57'; Shabani 74'; Baruai 80'	Report

Dire Dawa Stadium, Dire Dawa
15 November 2025
20:00

Burundi	0–4	Uganda
	Report	Ogema 11', 28'; Mukisa 31', 41'

Dire Dawa Stadium, Dire Dawa

18 November 2025
17:00

Sudan	0–9	Uganda
	Report	Mukisa 10', 13'; Ogema 43'; Kombi 55', 73'; Owino 69'; Fahad 78'; Babi 81'; Kayemba 89'

Dire Dawa Stadium, Dire Dawa
18 November 2025
20:00

Tanzania	11–0	Djibouti
Chole 13'; Mbalasalu 18', 25', 34', 52', 54' (pen.), 72'; Hamis 27'; Juma 45+1'; Athanasi 62'; Shabani 71'	Report

Dire Dawa Stadium, Dire Dawa
Referee: Solomon Lokudo (South Sudan)

21 November 2025
17:00

Djibouti	0–1	Burundi
	Report	Irabaruta 30'

Dire Dawa Stadium, Dire Dawa
21 November 2025
20:00

Uganda	1–2	Tanzania
Fahad 15'	Report	Athanasi 26'; Shabani 66'

Dire Dawa Stadium, Dire Dawa

24 November 2025
17:00

Burundi	0–5	Tanzania
	Report	Hamis 6', 37', 55'; Kilendemo 8'; Likungilo 87'

Dire Dawa Stadium, Dire Dawa
24 November 2025
20:00

Djibouti	1–3	Sudan
Asmar 62' (pen.)	Report	Sami Hassan 38'; El-Hassan Hilmi 44', 90+2'

Dire Dawa Stadium, Dire Dawa

26 November 2025
17:00

Sudan	1–0	Burundi
Al-Amin Ahmed 34'	Report

Dire Dawa Stadium, Dire Dawa
26 November 2025
20:00

Uganda	6–0	Djibouti
Ogema 15'; Jemba 45+2'; Kayemba 46'; Olwa 51', 53'; Fahad 72'	Report

Dire Dawa Stadium, Dire Dawa

==== Bracket ====
Semi-finals
30 November – Addis Ababa
Tanzania	3
Kenya	1
30 November – Addis Ababa
Ethiopia	0
Uganda	3

Final
2 December – Addis Ababa
Tanzania	3
Uganda	2
Third place
2 December – Addis Ababa
Ethiopia	3
Kenya	0

== South Zone ==
The COSAFA qualifiers for the U-17 Africa Cup of Nations were held in Harare, Zimbabwe, from 11 to 20 September 2024. The draw for the groups took place on 5 August 2025.

The qualification structure was as follows:

- Group stage: The 12 teams were divided into three groups, with the group winners and the best runner-up advancing to the knockout stage.
- Knockout stage: The four teams advancing from the second round competed in a three-match knockout round, with the winners of the semifinals qualifying for the final tournament.

=== Group stage ===
Group A
Pos	Team	Pld	W	D	L	GF	GA	GD	Pts	Qualification
1	Mozambique	3	2	1	0	5	0	+5	7	Semi-finals
2	Comoros	3	2	1	0	6	2	+4	7	Semi-finals
3	Zimbabwe (H)	3	0	1	2	2	4	−2	1	
4	Eswatini	3	0	1	2	0	7	−7	1	

Source: Soccerway
Rules for classification: Group stage tiebreakers
(H) Hosts

Group B
Pos	Team	Pld	W	D	L	GF	GA	GD	Pts	Qualification
1	South Africa	3	3	0	0	13	2	+11	9	Semi-finals
2	Malawi	3	2	0	1	6	6	0	6	
3	Zambia	3	1	0	2	6	7	−1	3	
4	Madagascar	3	0	0	3	3	13	−10	0	

Source: Soccerway
Rules for classification: Group stage tiebreakers

Group C
Pos	Team	Pld	W	D	L	GF	GA	GD	Pts	Qualification
1	Angola	3	3	0	0	17	0	+17	9	Semi-finals
2	Lesotho	3	1	1	1	3	7	−4	4	
3	Botswana	3	0	2	1	1	6	−5	2	
4	Mauritius	3	0	1	2	3	11	−8	1	

Source: Soccerway
Rules for classification: Group stage tiebreakers

=== Knockout stage ===
Semi-finals
18 September – Harare
South Africa	7
Comoros	0
18 September – Harare
Mozambique	0
Angola	1

Final
20 September – Harare
South Africa	2
Angola	1
Third place
20 September – Harare
Comoros	0
Mozambique	3

== Goalscorers ==
There have been 156 goals scored in 51 matches, for an average of 3.06 goals per match (as of 18 October 2025).

8 goals

- (Angola) Pedro Antonio

5 goals

- (South Africa) Thandanani Mhlongo

4 goals

- (Mozambique) Marcos Lazaro
- (Senegal) Souleymane Faye
- (South Africa) Omphemetse Sekgoto

3 goals

- (Angola) Paulo Luvumbo
- (Ghana) Robinho Gavi Yao
- (Guinea) Moussa Sano
- (Guinea-Bissau) Joãozinho Balde
- (Ivory Coast) Bema Doumbia
- (Malawi) James Lumbe
- (Mali) Abdoulaye Touré
- (Nigeria) George Agha
- (South Africa) Mpho Molepo
- (South Africa) Inganathi Simama

2 goals

- (Angola) Costantino Chianica
- (Angola) Eliseu Francisco
- (Angola) Jairo Muanha
- (Comoros) Fasifdine Ahamada
- (Comoros) Mathis Ali
- (The Gambia) Alagie Baba Leigh
- (Guinea) Seydouba Sylla
- (Guinea-Bissau) Ivaldino Bassague
- (Ivory Coast) Souhailio Bamba
- (Madagascar) William Rambeloson
- (Mali) Ismaël Kamissoko
- (Mali) Sanaba Keïta
- (Mauritius) Paw Kee
- (Mozambique) Chauson Nhabanga
- (Niger) Ibrahim Moctar
- (South Africa) Ntokozo Madondo
- (South Africa) Mpho Mbilini
- (Togo) Bernabé Amega
- (Zambia) Kelvin Chipelu

1 goal

- (Angola) Manuel Morais
- (Angola) Aphelele Majola
- (Benin) Jérémy Zannou
- (Botswana) Marcus Koketso
- (Burkina Faso) Halidou Diakité
- (Burkina Faso) Assifou Koné
- (Comoros) Kais Ali
- (Comoros) Fahad Mohamed
- (The Gambia) Lamin Bojang
- (The Gambia) Alieu Drammeh
- (The Gambia) Ahmed Njundu Kanyi
- (The Gambia) Modou Loum
- (Ghana) Michael Awuli
- (Ghana) Mark Mensah
- (Ghana) Joseph Narbi
- (Guinea) Kabir Cissé
- (Guinea) M. Zayatte Sylla
- (Guinea-Bissau) Alexandre Biai
- (Guinea-Bissau) Ravi Ca
- (Guinea-Bissau) Aiuba Dabo
- (Ivory Coast) Arafat Diabaté
- (Ivory Coast) Yao Hubert
- (Ivory Coast) Souleymane Tuo
- (Lesotho) Fisane Leanya
- (Lesotho) Lechesa Makhupane
- (Lesotho) Morena Masithela
- (Liberia) Alloycious Hyne
- (Madagascar) Tinai Razanadrakoto
- (Malawi) Joel Maziya
- (Malawi) Eli Rundles
- (Mali) Salia Diarra
- (Mali) Aboubacar Maïga
- (Mali) Fousseyni Sidibé
- (Mali) Mohamed Sogodogo
- (Mauritania) Sidi El Ide
- (Mauritania) Isselmou Mhaimid
- (Mauritius) Nicholas Fani
- (Mozambique) Kristff Machava
- (Mozambique) Joaquim Mubai
- (Niger) Ismaël Arbi
- (Niger) Ibrahim Touba
- (Nigeria) David Edeh
- (Nigeria) Famous Umole
- (Nigeria) Ahmed Yusuf
- (Senegal) Mahamet Ba
- (Senegal) Mamadou Diallo
- (Senegal) Ibrahima Dione
- (Senegal) El Hadji Ndiaye
- (Senegal) Magueye Niang
- (Sierra Leone) James Kanja
- (Sierra Leone) Musa Samura
- (Sierra Leone) Abubakarr Sidibay
- (South Africa) Siyabonga Mbongo
- (Togo) Sultan Ganiou
- (Zambia) Albert Kunda
- (Zambia) Steven Lungu
- (Zambia) Caleb Musonda
- (Zambia) Mapalo Simute
- (Zimbabwe) Tadiwa Chakuchichi

1 own goal

- (Comoros) Rayad Aboudou (against Zimbabwe)
- (Madagascar) Irintsoa Rakotoharimalala (against Malawi)
- (Mauritius) Elvino Andre (against Angola)
- (Zambia) Emmanuel Mbuti (against South Africa)

== See also ==
- 2025 U-20 Africa Cup of Nations qualification
