= 2009 UNIFFAC Cup =

Tournament details
- Host country: Cameroon
- City: Limbe
- Teams: 4 (from 1 confederation)
- Venue: 1 (in 1 host city)

Final positions
- Champions: Central African Republic (1st title)
- Runners-up: Gabon

The 2009 UNIFFAC Cup was the second UNIFFAC Cup competition to take place. All games were hosted in Limbe, Cameroon. It was contested by players under 17 years of age.

== Matches ==
Team	Pld	W	D	L	GF	GA	GD	Pts
Gabon	3	2	0	1	8	4	4	6
Central African Republic	3	2	0	1	4	2	2	6
Chad	3	2	0	1	4	4	0	6
Cameroon	3	0	0	3	1	7	−6	0

Cameroon	0–1	Central African Republic

Gabon	3–1	Chad

Cameroon	1 - 2	Chad

Central African Republic	3 - 1	Gabon

Cameroon	0–4	Gabon

Chad	1 - 0	Central African Republic

== Final ==
20 December

Central African Republic	2 - 1	Gabon
