= Ismaël Kamissoko =

Malian footballer (born 2009)

Personal information
- Date of birth: 4 January 2009 (age 17)
- Place of birth: Mali
- Position: Midfielder

Team information
- Current team: Etoiles du Mandé

Youth career
- Etoiles du Mandé

Senior career*
| Years | Team | Apps | (Gls) |
- Etoiles du Mandé

International career
- Mali U17
- * Club domestic league appearances and goals

Ismaël Kamissoko (born 4 January 2009) is a Malian footballer who plays as a midfielder for Etoiles du Mandé.

== Club career ==
As a youth player, Kamissoko joined the youth academy of Etoiles du Mandé and was promoted to the club's senior team, where he received interest from English side Burnley, Villarreal in the Spanish La Liga, Italian Serie A outfit Juventus, and OM in the French Ligue 1. While playing for them, he established himself as a regular starter.

== International career ==
Kamissoko is a Mali youth international and has represented the country internationally at under-17 level and has captained the Mali national under-17 football team. During the autumn of 2025, he played for the Mali national under-17 football team for 2026 U-17 Africa Cup of Nations qualification.

Seven months later, he played for the Mali national under-17 football team at the 2026 U-17 Africa Cup of Nations. In 2026, he played for the Mali national under-17 football team at the 2026 Jeux de l'Alliance des États du Sahel.

== Style of play ==
Kamissoko plays as a midfielder. African news website African-football.com wrote in 2026 "most striking about Kamissoko is his game intelligence. A true playmaker, he stands out for his ability to read situations, accelerate at the right moment, and slow the game down when necessary... Kamissoko's specialty: long-range shots. Capable of unleashing strikes from 20 to 25 meters with remarkable power and precision".
