= Dismas Shida Athanasi =

Tanzanian footballer (born 2006)

Personal information
- Full name: Dismas Shida Athanasi
- Date of birth: 26 December 2011 (age 14)
- Positions: Attacking midfielder; forward

Team information
- Current team: Talent Development Scheme

Youth career
- Francis Foundation Academy
- 2022–: Talent Development Scheme

International career^{‡}
Years	Team	Apps	(Gls)
2026–	Tanzania U17	6	(3)
- ‡ National team caps and goals as of 16:53, 4 June 2026 (UTC)

Dismas Shida Athanasi (born 26 December 2011) is a Tanzanian footballer who currently plays as a attacking midfielder at the Tanzanian Talent Development Scheme.

== Club career ==
Athanasi was developed at the Francis Foundation Academy, before joining the Talent Development Scheme set up by the Tanzania Football Federation in 2022.

== International career ==
Called up to the Tanzania squad for the 2026 U-17 Africa Cup of Nations at just fourteen years old, Athanasi scored his nation's first goal in their 3–0 opening group stage win against Mozambique. Though he did not score again in the group stage, Tanzania progressed through in second place to face Algeria in the quarter-finals, where two Athanasi goals helped them to a 3–3 draw, with Tanzania progressing on penalties. Despite Tanzania losing the final to Senegal on penalties, Athanasi was named as top-scorer in the competition.

== Style of play ==
In an interview with the Confederation of African Football, Athanasi stated that his best position was central attacking midfielder, but that he is also capable of playing in any forward role. Growing up he idolised Belgian playmaker Eden Hazard.
