= Ouezzin-Coulibaly Stadium =

Football stadium in Bamako, Mali

Ouezzin Coulibaly Stadium
- Interactive map of Ouezzin Coulibaly Stadium
- Location: Avenue de la Liberté, Commune III, Bamako, Mali
- Coordinates: 12.65445°N 7.99886°W
- Capacity: 5,000
- Surface: Grass

Construction
- Built: 1933
- Renovated: 2001, 2010

Tenants
- Various Malian clubs

The Ouezzin Coulibaly Stadium is a multi-purpose stadium located in Bamako, Mali. Originally named Stade Frédéric Assomption when it was built during the colonial period, it was renamed after the independence of Mali in 1960 in honour of Ouezzin Coulibaly, a prominent independence activist from Upper Volta (present-day Burkina Faso).

== History ==
The stadium was constructed in 1933 during the French Sudan colonial era and was among the first venues to host official football competitions in Mali. It served as the home ground for several Malian football clubs, including Jeanne d'Arc, Foyer, Aigle Noir, ASPTT, AS Cheminot, Espérance, Gallieni, JSCO, Niger, Richelieu, Racing, USTP, USI, and US Kati.

=== Renovations ===
The first major renovation of the stadium took place in 2001. A second renovation project began on March 19, 2009, focusing on the west stand and the interior facilities, including new locker rooms and multifunctional rooms. The project cost nearly one billion CFA francs and was financed by the Special Investment Budget (BSI). The renovated stadium was inaugurated by Malian president Amadou Toumani Touré in December 2010.

== Events ==
Since 2021, the stadium has hosted the annual cultural and artistic event Bama Art.

== Facilities ==
The stadium is part of a sports infrastructure rehabilitation programme under Mali's Economic and Social Development Plan (PDES). With a capacity of about 5,000 spectators, the stadium includes a football pitch, a basketball court, and a velodrome.
