= 2026 U-17 Africa Cup of Nations =

16th edition of U-17 AFCON

كأس الأمم الأفريقية تحت 17 سنة 2026; Coupe d'Afrique des nations de football des moins de 17 ans 2026

Tournament details
- Host country: Morocco
- Dates: 13 May – 2 June
- Teams: 16 (from 1 confederation)
- Venue: 1 (in 1 host city)

Final positions
- Champions: Senegal (2nd title)
- Runners-up: Tanzania
- Third place: Egypt
- Fourth place: Morocco

Tournament statistics
- Matches played: 34
- Goals scored: 81 (2.38 per match)
- Top scorer(s): (Tanzania) Dismas Shida (3 goals)
- Best player: (Tanzania) Issa Chole
- Best goalkeeper: (Senegal) Assane Sarr
- Fair play award: Tanzania

The 2026 U-17 Africa Cup of Nations (2026 U-17 AFCON; Arabic: كأس أمم إفريقيا لأقل من 17 سنة 2026), officially known as the TotalEnergies U-17 Africa Cup of Nations for sponsorship reasons, was the 16th edition (21st if editions held as World Cup qualifiers are included) of the U-17 Africa Cup of Nations, an annual international youth football tournament contested by African under-17 national teams and organized by the Confederation of African Football (CAF). It was hosted by Morocco for the second consecutive time from 13 May to 2 June 2026.

The top 10 teams qualified for the 2026 FIFA U-17 World Cup in Qatar as CAF representatives. Morocco, the defending champions, having won their first title in 2025, were beaten in the semifinals by Senegal, which went on to win the title for the second time after defeating Tanzania 4-2 on penalties in the final.

== Qualification ==
A total of 48 (out of 54) CAF member associations registered for the regional qualification phase of the competition. Congo withdrew from the qualifiers, while Equatorial Guinea were disqualified after several players failed MRI eligibility tests.

Of the 16 qualified teams, 11 participated in the previous edition. Algeria, Ghana, Ethiopia, and Mozambique return to the tournament, while DR Congo make their debut.

=== Qualified teams ===
The following teams qualified for the tournament.

Team	Zone	Date of qualification	Appearance	Last appearance	Previous best performance
Morocco (hosts)	North Zone	16 December 2024	5th	2025	Champions (2025)
Egypt	North Zone	5 April 2026	5th	2025	Champions (1997)
Algeria	North Zone	5 April 2026	3rd	2023	Runners-up (2009)
Tunisia	North Zone	5 April 2026	5th	2025	Third place (2013)
Senegal	West A Zone	15 October 2025	5th	2025	Champions (2023)
Mali	West A Zone	15 October 2025	11th	2025	Champions (2015, 2017)
Ivory Coast	West B Zone	30 September 2025	7th	2025	Champions (2013)
Ghana	West B Zone	30 September 2025	8th	2017	Champions (1995, 1999)
Cameroon	Central Zone	24 February 2026	10th	2025	Champions (2003, 2019)
DR Congo	Central Zone	24 February 2026	1st	None	Debut
Tanzania	Central-East Zone	30 November 2025	4th	2025	Group stage (2017, 2019, 2025)
Uganda	Central-East Zone	30 November 2025	3rd	2025	Group stage (2019, 2025)
Ethiopia	Central-East Zone	2 December 2025	4th	2003	Fourth place (1997)
South Africa	South Zone	18 September 2025	6th	2025	Runners-up (2015)
Angola	South Zone	18 September 2025	6th	2025	Third place (2019)
Mozambique	South Zone	20 September 2025	3rd	2001	Group stage (1995, 2001)

Qualification map of AFCON U-17 2026 Qualified Failed to qualify Banned or did not enter Withdrew Not a member of CAF

== Draw ==
The draw took place on 8 April 2026 at the CAF Headquarters in Cairo, Egypt, at 12:00 (GMT). The draw was conducted by African stars playing in the Egyptian Premier League; Fiston Mayele (DR Congo), Aliou Dieng (Mali) and Ahmed Belhadji (Morocco).

The 16 teams were divided into four pots of 4, and were seeded based on their performances in the last three editions of the U-17 Africa Cup of Nations (2019, 2023, and 2025). Hosts Morocco were automatically placed in position A1, while previous edition runners-up Mali were assigned to position C1. The remaining teams were drawn into the rest of the available positions.

Pot 1	Pot 2	Pot 3	Pot 4
Morocco (hosts); Senegal; Mali; Ivory Coast	South Africa; Cameroon; Angola; Tunisia	Uganda; Egypt; Algeria; Tanzania	Ethiopia; Ghana; DR Congo; Mozambique

== Venues ==
All matches are held in the Rabat metropolitan area. The Moulay Hassan Stadium hosted the opening match, both semi-finals, and the final, while the remaining fixtures are staged at the pitches of the Mohammed VI Football Academy.

Rabat	Salé
Moulay El Hassan Stadium	Mohammed VI Football Academy (3 pitches)
Capacity: 22,000	Mohammed VI Football Academy (3 pitches)

== Squads ==
Players born on 1 January 2009 or later are eligible to participate in this tournament.

== Match officials ==
Referees

- (Algeria) Rafiq Aouina
- (Burundi) Rodrigue Bigirimana
- (Cameroon) Willy Ngah
- (Ivory Coast) Tuonifere Soro
- (Democratic Republic of the Congo) Louis Mwamba
- (Egypt) Mahmoud Wafa
- (Equatorial Guinea) Gerson Esono Angono
- (The Gambia) Abdallah Jammeh
- (Ghana) Amoah Reginald-Collins
- (Liberia) Emmanuel Mensah
- (Madagascar) Arnaud Zafimahatoha
- (Morocco) Mohamed El Baroudi
- (Namibia) Antsino Twanyanyukwa
- (Namibia) Naftal Negongo
- (Niger) Mohamed Ali Moussa
- (Nigeria) Kasimu Abdulsalam
- (Senegal) Elhadji Amadou Sy
- (Somalia) Ahmed Hussein
- (Tanzania) Ahmed Arajiga
- (Togo) Fabrice Senyo
- (Tunisia) Abdellaoui Fredj
- (Uganda) Lucky Kasalirwe
- (Zambia) Hillary Hambaba

Assistant referees

- (Algeria) Yacine Ouerd-Benslama
- (Burkina Faso) Dofinte Lamien
- (Burundi) Herve Nduwayo
- (Cameroon) Vincent Nkemazem
- (Central African Republic) Wilfried Oriya-Zaoubaye
- (Chad) Ali Hatoup Daoud
- (Republic of the Congo) Vital Mapangoulou
- (Democratic Republic of the Congo) Archange Matalatala
- (Djibouti) Eleyeh Robleh
- (Egypt) Mohamed Magdy
- (Gabon) Junior Assoughe
- (Libya) Mohamed Al-Teer
- (Madagascar) Larenion Miladera
- (Niger) Sakina Hamidou Alfa
- (Rwanda) Emmanuel Habumugisha
- (South Africa) Cledwin Baloyi
- (São Tomé and Príncipe) Luis Ferreira
- (Seychelles) Shaji Padayachy
- (Tanzania) Kassim Mpanga
- (Tunisia) Yassine Saadaoui
- (Uganda) Brianson Musisi
- (Zambia) Nancy Kasitu

== Group stage ==
=== Tiebreakers ===
Teams were ranked according to the three points for a win system (3 points for a win, 1 for a draw, 0 points for a loss), and if tied on points, the following tiebreaking criteria were applied, in the order given, to determine the rankings:

1. Points in head-to-head matches among tied teams;
2. Goal difference in head-to-head matches among tied teams;
3. Goals scored in head-to-head matches among tied teams;
4. If more than two teams were tied, and after applying all head-to-head criteria above, if two teams are still tied, all head-to-head criteria above are applied exclusively to these two teams;
5. Goal difference in all group matches;
6. Goals scored in all group matches;
7. Drawing of lots.

=== Group A ===
Pos	Team	Pld	W	D	L	GF	GA	GD	Pts	Qualification
1	Morocco (H)	3	2	1	0	5	3	+2	7	Knockout stage and FIFA U-17 World Cup
2	Egypt	3	1	1	1	3	3	0	4	Knockout stage and FIFA U-17 World Cup
3	Ethiopia	3	1	1	1	2	2	0	4	FIFA U-17 World Cup play-off
4	Tunisia	3	0	1	2	2	4	−2	1	

Source: CAF GSA
Rules for classification: Group stage tiebreakers
(H) Hosts
13 May 2026
14:00

Egypt	0–0	Ethiopia
	Report

Mohammed VI Football Academy (pitch 11), Salé
Referee: Hillary Hambaba (Zambia)
13 May 2026
20:00

Morocco	1–1	Tunisia
Hadidi 76'	Report	Jlidi 27'

Moulay El Hassan Stadium, Rabat
Referee: Abdallah Jammeh (Gambia)

16 May 2026
14:00

Tunisia	1–2	Egypt
Thabti 11' (pen.)	Report	M. Gamal 42' (pen.); Abou El-Ezz 89'

Mohammed VI Football Academy (pitch 11), Salé
Referee: Lucky Kasalirwe (Uganda)
16 May 2026
20:00

Ethiopia	1–2	Morocco
Kasaw 24'	Report	Moustache 48'; Talai 90+1'

Mohammed VI Football Academy (pitch 8), Salé
Referee: Willy Ngah (Cameroon)

19 May 2026
20:00

Morocco	2–1	Egypt
Moustache 18'; Talai 45+2'	Report	Soudi 49'

Mohammed VI Football Academy (pitch 8), Salé
Referee: Kasimu Abdulsalam (Nigeria)
19 May 2026
20:00

Tunisia	0–1	Ethiopia
	Report	Misbah 90+3'

Mohammed VI Football Academy (pitch 11), Salé
Referee: Antsino Twanyanyukwa (Namibia)

=== Group B ===
Pos	Team	Pld	W	D	L	GF	GA	GD	Pts	Qualification
1	Ivory Coast	3	2	1	0	5	2	+3	7	Knockout stage and FIFA U-17 World Cup
2	Cameroon	3	2	0	1	2	2	0	6	Knockout stage and FIFA U-17 World Cup
3	Uganda	3	1	1	1	5	3	+2	4	FIFA U-17 World Cup play-off
4	DR Congo	3	0	0	3	0	5	−5	0	

Source: CAF GSA
Rules for classification: Group stage tiebreakers
13 May 2026
14:00

Ivory Coast	2–0	Cameroon
Nomane 52'; Yao 57'	Report

Mohammed VI Football Academy (pitch 3), Salé
Referee: Mohamed El Baroudi (Morocco)
13 May 2026
17:00

Uganda	3–0	DR Congo
Mukisa 37'; Kawooya 45+2'; Babi 82'	Report

Mohammed VI Football Academy (pitch 8), Salé
Referee: Mahmoud Wafa (Egypt)

16 May 2026
17:00

Cameroon	1–0	Uganda
Soudeisse 24'	Report

Mohammed VI Football Academy (pitch 3), Salé
Referee: Antsino Twanyanyukwa (Namibia)
16 May 2026
20:00

DR Congo	0–1	Ivory Coast
	Report	H. Diabaté 90+2' (pen.)

Mohammed VI Football Academy (pitch 11), Salé
Referee: Rafik Aouina (Algeria)

19 May 2026
17:00

Ivory Coast	2–2	Uganda
Drebo 24'; Koné 78'	Report	Muhoozi 41'; Ibanda 90+14' (pen.)

Mohammed VI Football Academy (pitch 11), Salé
Referee: Hillary Hambaba (Zambia)
19 May 2026
17:00

Cameroon	1–0	DR Congo
Tsombeng 45+6'	Report

Mohammed VI Football Academy (pitch 3), Salé
Referee: Elhadji Amadou Sy (Senegal)

=== Group C ===
Pos	Team	Pld	W	D	L	GF	GA	GD	Pts	Qualification
1	Tanzania	3	2	0	1	7	2	+5	6	Knockout stage and FIFA U-17 World Cup
2	Mali	3	1	2	0	3	2	+1	5	Knockout stage and FIFA U-17 World Cup
3	Mozambique	3	1	1	1	3	5	−2	4	FIFA U-17 World Cup play-off
4	Angola	3	0	1	2	1	5	−4	1	

Source: CAF GSA
Rules for classification: Group stage tiebreakers
14 May 2026
14:00

Mali	0–0	Angola
	Report

Mohammed VI Football Academy (pitch 3), Salé
Referee: Rodrigue Bigirimana (Burundi)
14 May 2026
17:00

Tanzania	3–0	Mozambique
Shida 26'; Miambo 35' (o.g.); Mbegelendi 63'	Report

Mohammed VI Football Academy (pitch 11), Salé
Referee: Emmanuel Mensah (Liberia)

17 May 2026
14:00

Angola	0–3	Tanzania
	Report	Mbegelendi 27'; Kizinga 52'; Hamis 66'

Mohammed VI Football Academy (pitch 3), Salé
Referee: Mohamed El Baroudi (Morocco)
17 May 2026
20:00

Mozambique	1–1	Mali
Pelembe 5'	Report	Sylla 65'

Mohammed VI Football Academy (pitch 8), Salé
Referee: Reginald Amoah (Ghana)

20 May 2026
17:00

Mali	2–1	Tanzania
Touré 3', 39'	Report	Mkindai 82'

Mohammed VI Football Academy (pitch 8), Salé
Referee: Tuoniféré Soro (Ivory Coast)
20 May 2026
17:00

Angola	1–2	Mozambique
Francisco 27'	Report	Allan 22'; Charif 55'

Mohammed VI Football Academy (pitch 11), Salé
Referee: Gerson Esono Angono (Equatorial Guinea)

=== Group D ===
Pos	Team	Pld	W	D	L	GF	GA	GD	Pts	Qualification
1	Senegal	3	2	0	1	4	3	+1	6	Knockout stage and FIFA U-17 World Cup
2	Algeria	3	1	1	1	5	4	+1	4 (Note: Tied on head-to-head, points, goal difference, and goals scored. Algeria were drawn over Ghana by CAF, according to the regulations of the tournament.)	Knockout stage and FIFA U-17 World Cup
3	Ghana	3	1	1	1	5	4	+1	4	FIFA U-17 World Cup play-off
4	South Africa	3	1	0	2	3	6	−3	3	

Source: CAF GSA
Notes:
14 May 2026
17:00

Senegal	1–2	South Africa
Thior 44'	Report	Simama 48'; Thior 55' (o.g.)

Mohammed VI Football Academy (pitch 8), Salé
Referee: Kasimu Abdulsalam (Nigeria)
14 May 2026
20:00

Algeria	2–2	Ghana
Benali 57'; Zaidi 60'	Report	Gavi 3'; Gyamfi 10'

Mohammed VI Football Academy (pitch 3), Salé
Referee: Ahmed Arajiga (Tanzania)

17 May 2026
17:00

South Africa	0–2	Algeria
	Report	Abed 41', 85'

Mohammed VI Football Academy (pitch 11), Salé
Referee: Emmanuel Mensah (Liberia)
17 May 2026
17:00

Ghana	0–1	Senegal
	Report	Dione 58'

Mohammed VI Football Academy (pitch 3), Salé
Referee: Negongo Naftal (Namibia)

20 May 2026
20:00

Senegal	2–1	Algeria
Dieng 15'; Faye 43' (pen.)	Report	Mekkaoui 5'

Mohammed VI Football Academy (pitch 11), Salé
Referee: Rodrigue Bigirimana (Burundi)
20 May 2026
20:00

South Africa	1–3	Ghana
Mhlongo 65'	Report	Narbi 8' (pen.), 42' (pen.); Appiah 90+2'

Mohammed VI Football Academy (pitch 3), Salé
Referee: Mahmoud Wafa (Egypt)

== Play-off matches ==
The winners qualify for the 2026 U-17 World Cup.

23 May 2026
17:00

Ethiopia	1–1	Mozambique
Misbah 16'	Report	Pelembe 56'
Penalties
Alemayehu (penalty scored); Guta (penalty scored); Selesh (penalty missed); Ufaysa (penalty scored); Mengistu (penalty scored)	4–5	(penalty scored) Miambo; (penalty scored) Mubaí; (penalty scored) Vieira; (penalty scored) Matias; (penalty scored) Charif

Mohammed VI Football Academy (pitch 8), Salé
Referee: Rafik Aouina (Algeria)
23 May 2026
20:00

Uganda	2–2	Ghana
Mukisa 34'; Ibanda 90+1' (pen.)	Report	Gyamfi 9'; Abdul Latif 51'
Penalties
Owino (penalty scored); Muhoozi (penalty scored); Babi (penalty scored); Olwa (penalty scored); Ibanda (penalty scored); Mbalire (penalty scored); Suuna (penalty scored); Mubiru (penalty scored)	8–7	(penalty scored) Narbi; (penalty scored) Mensah; (penalty scored) Abdul Latif; (penalty scored) Nyantakyi; (penalty scored) Barfo; (penalty scored) Appiah; (penalty scored) Yao Gavi; (penalty missed) J. Kpoeti

Mohammed VI Football Academy (pitch 11), Salé
Referee: Abdellaoui Fradj (Tunisia)

== Knockout stage ==
In the knockout stage, penalty shoot-outs were used to decide the winners should a match is tied after 90 minutes. (Regulations Article 75).

=== Bracket ===
Quarter-finals
24 May – Salé (pitch 8)
Morocco	1
Cameroon	0
24 May – Salé (pitch 3)
Senegal (p)	1 (4)
Mali	1 (2)
24 May – Salé (pitch 11)
Tanzania (p)	3 (4)
Algeria	3 (3)
24 May – Salé (pitch 11)
Ivory Coast	1
Egypt	4

Semi-finals
28 May – Rabat
Morocco	1 (6)
Senegal (p)	1 (7)
28 May – Rabat
Tanzania (p)	0 (4)
Egypt	0 (3)

Final
2 June – Rabat
Senegal	1 (4)
Tanzania	1 (2)
Third place match
1 June – Salé (pitch 8)
Morocco	0
Egypt	2

=== Quarter-finals ===
24 May 2026
14:00

Tanzania	3–3	Algeria
Shida 25', 61'; Mbalasalu 45+8'	Report	Valmy 4', 40'; Benramdane 65'
Penalties
Mbegelendi (penalty scored); Lupuga (penalty scored); Mbalasalu (penalty scored); Kizinga (penalty scored)	4–3	(penalty scored) Mekkaoui; (penalty scored) Touali; (penalty missed) Benramdane; (penalty scored) Dahmas; (penalty missed) Valmy

Mohammed VI Football Academy (pitch 11), Salé
Referee: Kasimu Abdulsalam (Nigeria)
24 May 2026
17:00

Senegal	1–1	Mali
Faye 19'	Report	Koita 90+1' (pen.)
Penalties
Dieng (penalty scored); Sadio (penalty scored); Sow (penalty scored); Kane (penalty missed); Mbodji (penalty scored)	4–2	(penalty scored) Sacko; (penalty scored) Diarra; (penalty missed) Doumbia; (penalty missed) Maiga

Mohammed VI Football Academy (pitch 3), Salé
Referee: Lucky Kasalirwe (Uganda)

24 May 2026
17:00

Morocco	1–0	Cameroon
Zinbi 17'	Report

Mohammed VI Football Academy (pitch 8), Salé
Referee: Ahmed Arajiga (Tanzania)
24 May 2026
20:00

Ivory Coast	1–4	Egypt
Cissé 54' (pen.)	Report	Mokhtar 30', 45+3'; Beshir 38'; Soudi 84'

Mohammed VI Football Academy (pitch 11), Salé
Referee: Rodrigue Bigirimana (Burundi)

=== Semi-finals ===
28 May 2026
17:00

Tanzania	0–0	Egypt
Penalties
Mbegelendi (penalty missed); Yusuph (penalty scored); Kilendemo (penalty scored); Juma (penalty scored); Mbalasalu (penalty scored)	4–3	(penalty scored) Gamal; (penalty scored) Abo Elezz; (penalty missed) Nour; (penalty scored) Evouna; (penalty missed) Mohamed

Moulay El Hassan Stadium, Rabat
Referee: Antsino Twanyanyukwa (Namibia)
28 May 2026
20:00

Morocco	1–1	Senegal
El Aoud 90+10' (pen.)		Wagne 24'
Penalties
El Aoud (penalty scored); Ibn Salah (penalty missed); Moustache (penalty missed); Rabbaj (penalty scored); Soudi (penalty scored); Alioui (penalty missed); El Boujjoufi (penalty scored); Bentaleb (penalty scored); Chllali (penalty scored); Ellaky (penalty missed)	6–7	(penalty missed) Dieng; (penalty scored) Sadio; (penalty scored) Sow; (penalty missed) Mahamet; (penalty scored) Mbodji; (penalty missed) Niang; (penalty scored) Sarr; (penalty scored) Mbengue; (penalty scored) Thierno; (penalty scored) Biaye

Moulay El Hassan Stadium, Rabat
Referee: Hillary Hambaba (Zambia)

=== Third place match ===
1 June 2026
20:00

Morocco	0–2	Egypt
		M. E. Sayed 32'; Beshir 90+12'

Mohammed VI Football Academy (pitch 8), Salé
Referee: Kasimu Abdulsalam (Nigeria)

=== Final ===
2 June 2026
19:00

Senegal	1–1	Tanzania
Dione 64'		Chenga 7'
Penalties
Faye (penalty scored); Sadio (penalty scored); Dione (penalty scored); Thior (penalty scored)	4–2	Yusuph (penalty scored); Mbegelendi (penalty scored); Kilendemo (penalty missed); Mbegu (penalty missed)

Moulay El Hassan Stadium, Rabat
Referee: Rafik Aouina (Algeria)

== Goalscorers ==
There were 81 goals scored in 34 matches, for an average of 2.38 goals per match.

3 goals

- (Tanzania) Dismas Shida

2 goals

- (Algeria) Yacine Abed
- (Algeria) Mouhamed Valmy
- (Egypt) Ahmed Beshir
- (Egypt) Khaled Mokhtar
- (Egypt) Ziad Soudi
- (Ethiopia) Amir Misbah
- (Mali) Abdoulaye Touré
- (Morocco) Mohamed Moustache
- (Morocco) Imran Talai
- (Mozambique) Diego Pelembe
- (Senegal) Ibrahima Dione
- (Senegal) Souleymane Commissaire Faye
- (Tanzania) Razaki Mbegelendi
- (Ghana) Eric Adu Gyamfi
- (Ghana) Joseph Narbi
- (Uganda) Arafat Ibanda
- (Uganda) Owen Mukisa

1 goal

- (Algeria) Adam Benali
- (Algeria) Noah Benramdane
- (Algeria) Ilyès Mekkaoui
- (Algeria) Melwane Zaidi
- (Angola) Eliseu Francisco
- (Cameroon) Abdoulraman Soudeisse
- (Cameroon) Oumar Tsombeng
- (Egypt) Mohamed El Sayed
- (Egypt) Amir Abou El-Ezz
- (Egypt) Mohamed Gamal
- (Ethiopia) Dawit Kasaw
- (Ghana) Wunzalgu Abdul Latif
- (Ghana) Augustine Appiah
- (Ghana) Robinho Yao Gavi
- (Ivory Coast) Broulaye Cissé
- (Ivory Coast) Harafat Diabaté
- (Ivory Coast) Koudougnon Drebo
- (Ivory Coast) Souleymane Koné
- (Ivory Coast) Ange Nomane
- (Ivory Coast) Hubert Yao
- (Mali) Djigui Koita
- (Mali) Youssif Sylla
- (Morocco) Ismail El Aoud
- (Morocco) Ilian Hadidi
- (Morocco) Mohamed Habib Zinbi
- (Mozambique) Charif Carlos
- (Mozambique) Allan de Figueiredo
- (Senegal) Cheikh Dieng
- (Senegal) Cheikh Thior
- (Senegal) Mouhamed Wagne
- (South Africa) Obama Mhlongo
- (South Africa) Inganathi Simama
- (Tanzania) Sadam Hamis
- (Tanzania) Hasan Kizinga
- (Tanzania) Luqman Mbalasalu
- (Tanzania) Hamis Chenga
- (Tanzania) Hassan Mkindai
- (Tunisia) Yahya Jlidi
- (Tunisia) Moncef Thabti
- (Uganda) Abdulshakur Babi
- (Uganda) Nicholas Kawooya
- (Uganda) Henry Muhoozi

1 own goal

- (Mozambique) Pascoal Miambo (against Tanzania)
- (Senegal) Cheikh Thior (against South Africa)

== Awards ==
=== Man of the match ===
The Man of the Match award was presented after each game during the tournament. The award, presented by TotalEnergies, included an official trophy handed to the player at the end of the match.

Stage	Team 1	Result	Team 2	Man of the Match
Group stage matches
Group A	Morocco	**1–1**	Tunisia	(Morocco) Ibrahim Rabbaj
Group A	Egypt	**0–0**	Ethiopia	(Egypt) Ahmed Safwat
Group B	Ivory Coast	**2–0**	Cameroon	(Ivory Coast) Hubert Yao
Group B	Uganda	**3–0**	DR Congo	(Uganda) Owen Mukisa
Group C	Mali	**0–0**	Angola	(Angola) Gelson Joaquim Dala
Group C	Tanzania	**3–0**	Mozambique	(Tanzania) Issa Mussa Chole
Group D	Senegal	**1–2**	South Africa	(Senegal) Cheikh Dieng
Group D	Algeria	**2–2**	Ghana	(Ghana) Eric Adu Gyamfi
Group A	Tunisia	**1–2**	Egypt	(Tunisia) Yahya Jlidi
Group A	Ethiopia	**1–2**	Morocco	(Morocco) Adam Soudi
Group B	Cameroon	**1–0**	Uganda	(Uganda) Muhoozi Henry
Group B	DR Congo	**0–1**	Ivory Coast	(Ivory Coast) Youssouf Diabate
Group C	Angola	**0–3**	Tanzania	(Tanzania) Saddam Hussen Hamis
Group C	Mozambique	**1–1**	Mali	(Mali) Youssif Sylla
Group D	South Africa	**0–2**	Algeria	(Algeria) Yacine Abed
Group D	Ghana	**0–1**	Senegal	(Senegal) Assane Sarr
Group A	Morocco	**2–1**	Egypt	(Morocco) Marouane Bentaleb
Group A	Tunisia	**0–1**	Ethiopia	(Ethiopia) Binyam Abrha Teare
Group B	Ivory Coast	**2–2**	Uganda	(Ivory Coast) Abdoul-Rahamane Doumbia
Group B	Cameroon	**1–0**	DR Congo	(Cameroon) Esingila George Mbinde
Group C	Mali	**2–1**	Tanzania	(Mali) Abdoulaye Toure
Group C	Angola	**1–2**	Mozambique	(Mozambique) Diego Elias Pelembe
Group D	Senegal	**2–1**	Algeria	(Senegal) Souleymane Commissaire Faye
Group D	South Africa	**1–3**	Ghana	(Ghana) Joseph Narbi
Play-off matches
Play-off matches	Ethiopia	**1–1** (4–5 p)	Mozambique	(Mozambique) Júlio Boas Júnior
Play-off matches	Uganda	**2–2** (8–7 p)	Ghana	(Ghana) Abdul Latif Wunzalgu Zakiu
Knock-out stage matches
Quarter-finals	Morocco	**1–0**	Cameroon	(Morocco) Mohamed Habib Zinbi
Quarter-finals	Senegal	**1–1** (4–2 p)	Mali	(Senegal) Assane Sarr
Quarter-finals	Ivory Coast	**1–4**	Egypt	(Egypt) Khaled Mokhtar
Quarter-finals	Tanzania	**3–3** (4–3 p)	Algeria	(Algeria) Mouhammad Valmy
Semi-finals	Morocco	**1–1** (6–7 p)	Senegal	(Senegal) Mouhamed Wagne
Semi-finals	Tanzania	**0–0** (4–3 p)	Egypt	(Tanzania) Issa Mussa Chole
Third place play-off	Morocco	**0–2**	Egypt	(Egypt) Mohamed Ebeid
Final	Senegal	**1–1** (4–2 p)	Tanzania	(Senegal) Mouhamed Wagne

=== Final Ranking ===
Matches that ended in extra time were counted as wins and defeats, while matches that ended in a penalty shoot-out were counted as draws. The national team shown in italics represent the host nation. The competition's winning team is shown in bold.

Results of countries participating in AFCON U17 2026 Champion Runner-up Third place Fourth place Quarter-finals Play-off matches Group stage

Pos.	Team	G	Pld	W	D	L	Pts	GF	GA	GD
1	**Senegal**	D	6	2	3	1	9	7	6	+1
2	Tanzania	C	6	2	3	1	9	11	6	+5
3	Egypt	A	6	3	2	1	11	9	4	+5
4	Morocco	A	6	3	2	1	11	7	6	+1
**Eliminated in the quarter-finals**
5	Ivory Coast	B	4	2	1	1	7	6	6	0
6	Mali	C	4	1	3	0	6	4	3	+1
7	Cameroon	B	4	2	0	2	6	2	3	−1
8	Algeria	D	4	1	2	1	5	8	7	+1
**Played play-off matches**
9	Uganda	B	4	1	2	1	5	7	5	+2
10	Ethiopia	A	4	1	2	1	5	3	3	0
11	Mozambique	C	4	1	2	1	5	4	6	−2
12	Ghana	D	4	1	2	1	5	7	6	+1
**Eliminated in the group stage**
13	South Africa	D	3	1	0	2	3	3	6	−3
14	Tunisia	A	3	0	1	2	1	2	4	−2
15	Angola	C	3	0	1	2	1	1	5	−4
16	DR Congo	B	3	0	0	3	0	0	5	−5

== Qualified teams for FIFA U-17 World Cup ==
The following ten teams from CAF qualified for the 2026 FIFA U-17 World Cup in Qatar.

Team	Qualified on	Previous appearances in FIFA U-17 World Cup^{1}
Tanzania	17 May 2026	0 (debut)
Ivory Coast	19 May 2026	5 (1987, 2005, 2011, 2013, 2025)
Cameroon	19 May 2026	2 (2003, 2019)
Morocco	19 May 2026	3 (2013, 2023, 2025)
Egypt	19 May 2026	3 (1987, 1997, 2025)
Mali	20 May 2026	7 (1997, 1999, 2001, 2015, 2017, 2023, 2025)
Senegal	20 May 2026	3 (2019, 2023, 2025)
Algeria	20 May 2026	1 (2009)
Mozambique	23 May 2026	0 (debut)
Uganda	23 May 2026	1 (2025)

^{1} Bold indicates champions for that year. Italic indicates hosts for that year.

== See also ==
- 2025 U-20 Africa Cup of Nations

== Notes ==
1. There were three pitches available plus the Moulay El Hassan Stadium inside the Mohammed VI Football Academy for a total of four pitches for the tournament.
