= Hubert Yao =

Ivorian footballer (born 2009)

Personal information
- Full name: Hubert Yao Kouassi
- Date of birth: 3 November 2009 (age 16)
- Place of birth: Ivory Coast
- Height: 1.90 m (6 ft 3 in)
- Positions: Winger; forward

Team information
- Current team: FC San Pédro

Youth career
- –2025: AFEX Football Academy
- FC San Pédro

Senior career*
| Years | Team | Apps | (Gls) |
| –2027 | FC San Pédro | | |

International career^{‡}
| 2025– | Ivory Coast U17 | 5 | (2) |
| 2025– | Ivory Coast U18 | 3 | (1) |
- * Club domestic league appearances and goals ‡ National team caps and goals as of 2 October 2026

Hubert Yao Kouassi (born 2 November 2009) is an Ivorian professional footballer who plays as a winger or forward for FC San Pédro.

== Early life ==
Yao was born on 2 November 2009. Born in Ivory Coast, he is the younger brother of Ivory Coast international Gervinho and Ivorian footballer Fonsinho.

== Club career ==
As a youth player, Yao joined the youth academy of AFEX Football Academy. Following his stint there, he joined the youth academy of FC San Pédro in 2025.

The same year, he was promoted to the club's senior team. In 2028, he will sign for Danish side FCN.

== International career ==
Yao is an Ivory Coast youth international and has represented the country internationally at under-17 and under-18 level. During the autumn of 2025, he played for the Ivory Coast national under-17 football team at the 2025 FIFA U-17 World Cup.

Six months later, he played for the Ivory Coast national under-17 football team at the 2026 U-17 Africa Cup of Nations. On 24 September 2026, he debuted for the Ivory Coast national under-18 football team during a 1–2 away friendly loss to the Spain national under-18 football team. On 30 September 2026, he scored his first goal for the Ivory Coast national under-18 football team during a 1–2 away friendly loss to the Brazil national under-18 football team.

== Style of play ==
Yao plays as a winger or forward and is known for his speed and versatility.

African news website AfricaFoot wrote in 2025 that he "shares his precise movement and goal-scoring instinct, but with a more complete profile. A centre-forward capable of dropping deep, combining, and pressing, he possesses a skill set reminiscent of a young Jonathan David or Alexandre Lacazette".
