= DR Congo national under-17 football team =

National under-17 association football team representing DR Congo

DR Congo U-17
- Nickname: Small Leopards
- Association: Fédération Congolaise de Football-Association (FECOFA)
- Confederation: CAF (Africa)
- Sub-confederation: UNIFFAC (Central Africa)
First colours	Second colours

U-17 Africa Cup of Nations
- Appearances: 1 (first in 2026)
- Best result: TBD (2026)

FIFA U-17 World Cup
- Appearances: None

The DR Congo national under-17 football team, nicknamed the Small Leopards, represents DR Congo in international youth football competitions. Its primary role is the development of players in preparation for the senior national team. The team competes in a variety of competitions, including the biennial FIFA U-17 World Cup and the U-17 Africa Cup of Nations, which is the top competitions for this age group.

== Competitive record ==
=== FIFA U-16 and U-17 World Cup record ===
FIFA U-16 and U-17 World Cup
Year	Round	GP	W	D^{1}	L	GS	GA
(China) 1985	Did not qualify						
(Canada) 1987	Did not qualify						
(Scotland) 1989	Did not qualify						
(Italy) 1991	Did not qualify						
(Japan) 1993	Did not qualify						
(Ecuador) 1995	Did not qualify						
(Egypt) 1997	Did not qualify						
(New Zealand) 1999	Did not qualify						
(Trinidad and Tobago) 2001	Did not qualify						
(Finland) 2003	Did not qualify						
(Peru) 2005	Did not qualify						
(South Korea) 2007	Did not qualify						
(Nigeria) 2009	Did not qualify						
(Mexico) 2011	Did not qualify						
(United Arab Emirates) 2013	Did not qualify						
(Chile) 2015	Did not qualify						
(India) 2017	Did not qualify						
(Brazil) 2019	Did not qualify						
(Indonesia) 2023	Did not qualify						
(Qatar) 2025	Did not qualify						
Total	0/20	0	0	0	0	0	0

^{1}Draws include knockout matches decided on penalty kicks.

== See also ==
- DR Congo national football team
- DR Congo national under-20 football team
