= Central African Republic national under-17 football team =

National under-17 association football team representing the Central African Republic

Central African Republic U-17
- Nickname(s): Les Fauves (The Wild Beasts)
- Association: Central African Football Federation
- Confederation: CAF (Africa)
- Sub-confederation: UNIFFAC (Central Africa)
First colours	Second colours

First international
- Central African Republic 3–0 Congo (Bangui, Central African Republic; 27 June 2004)

Biggest win
- Central African Republic 3–0 Congo (Bangui, Central African Republic; 27 June 2004)

Biggest defeat
- Cameroon 9–0 Central African Republic (Douala, Cameroon; 16 February 2025)

U-17 Africa Cup of Nations
- Appearances: 1 (first in 2025)
- Best result: Group stage (2025)

FIFA U-17 World Cup
- Appearances: None

The Central African Republic national under-17 football team, nicknamed the Wild Beasts, represents the Central African Republic in international youth football competitions. Its primary role is the development of players in preparation for the senior national team. The team competes in a variety of competitions, including the biennial FIFA U-17 World Cup and the U-17 Africa Cup of Nations, which is the top competitions for this age group.

== Competitive record ==
=== FIFA U-16 and U-17 World Cup record ===
FIFA U-16 and U-17 World Cup
Year	Round	GP	W	D^{1}	L	GS	GA
(China) 1985	Did not qualify						
(Canada) 1987	Did not qualify						
(Scotland) 1989	Did not qualify						
(Italy) 1991	Did not qualify						
(Japan) 1993	Did not qualify						
(Ecuador) 1995	Did not qualify						
(Egypt) 1997	Did not qualify						
(New Zealand) 1999	Did not qualify						
(Trinidad and Tobago) 2001	Did not qualify						
(Finland) 2003	Did not qualify						
(Peru) 2005	Did not qualify						
(South Korea) 2007	Did not qualify						
(Nigeria) 2009	Did not qualify						
(Mexico) 2011	Did not qualify						
(United Arab Emirates) 2013	Did not qualify						
(Chile) 2015	Did not qualify						
(India) 2017	Did not qualify						
(Brazil) 2019	Did not qualify						
(Indonesia) 2023	Did not qualify						
(Qatar) 2025	Did not qualify						
Total	0/20	0	0	0	0	0	0

^{1}Draws include knockout matches decided on penalty kicks.

== Current players ==
The following players were called up to the squad for the 2025 U-17 Africa Cup of Nations.

No.	Pos.	Player	Date of birth (age)	Club
1	GK	Yarin Stive Dothe Bebona	25 August 2008 (aged 16)	(French Football Federation) FC Montfermeil
2	DF	Merveil De Dieu Zourou	12 July 2008 (aged 16)	(Central African Football Federation) FCF Academy
3	DF	Yowan Chrislin Molondoko	24 September 2008 (aged 16)	(Central African Football Federation) FCF Academy
4	DF	Nelson Amadi	6 March 2008 (aged 17)	(French Football Federation) FC Metz
5	DF	Basile Destin Selemby	6 April 2008 (aged 16)	(French Football Federation) Montpellier HSC
7	MF	Constantin Nevys Saidou	10 August 2009 (aged 15)	(Central African Football Federation) FCF Academy
8	MF	Edwin Titalom-Penka	31 May 2009 (aged 15)	(French Football Federation) AS Saint-Priest
9	FW	Venance Goporo	30 March 2009 (aged 16)	(Central African Football Federation) SCAF Tocages
10	MF	Lewis Killian Mackfoy	15 January 2008 (aged 17)	(French Football Federation) ESTAC
11	FW	Lionel Kodane	3 January 2009 (aged 16)	(French Football Federation) Paris FC
12	MF	Anan Jefferson Otto	11 June 2009 (aged 15)	(Central African Football Federation) TP USCA Bangui
13	MF	Rondy Christopher Kethevoama	15 December 2008 (aged 16)	(Central African Football Federation) EFDY
14	FW	Chrispin Ngombe	12 March 2008 (aged 17)	(Central African Football Federation) EFDY
16	GK	Jovani Guidat-Henzo	23 August 2008 (aged 16)	(Central African Football Federation) Anges de Fatima
17	FW	Christopher Ngoandjide	4 July 2009 (aged 15)	(Central African Football Federation) FCF Academy
20	FW	Jerry Christian Bogote	6 April 2008 (aged 16)	(Central African Football Federation) FCF Academy
21	MF	Lucres Betoloum-Bonai	25 March 2008 (aged 17)	(Central African Football Federation) DFC8
22	GK	Ousman Tanko Binguimale	26 December 2009 (aged 15)	(Central African Football Federation) FCF Academy
23	DF	Steven Tita-Kenguemba	13 March 2008 (aged 17)	(French Football Federation) AS Saint-Priest
24	DF	Josué Palanda	14 May 2009 (aged 15)	(Central African Football Federation) FCF Academy
25	DF	Deymon Ephrem Yandocka	25 March 2008 (aged 17)	(French Football Federation) AS Saint-Priest
–	DF	Rodolphe Kouzoutelendji		(Central African Football Federation) FCF Academy
–	DF	Henri II Le Petit Bamongo		(Central African Football Federation) FCF Academy
–	MF	Abakar Abdelaziz		(Central African Football Federation) SEWA
–	MF	St-François Koyembe		(Central African Football Federation) AS Tempête Mocaf

== See also ==
- Central African Republic national football team
- Central African Republic national under-20 football team
