= 2017 U-17 Africa Cup of Nations squads =

Football tournament squads

The 2017 Africa U-17 Cup of Nations was an international age-restricted football tournament which was held in Gabon from 14 to 28 May. The 8 representative teams involved in the tournament were required to register a squad of 21 players, including three goalkeepers. Only players born or after 1 January 2000 were eligible to be registered in these squads, only players registered in the squads were eligible to take part in the tournament.

== Group A ==
=== Cameroon ===
Head coach: Bertin Ebewelle

| No. | Pos. | Player | Date of birth (age) | Club |
|---|---|---|---|---|
| 1 | GK | Michel Ghandi Hamako | 26 September 2000 (aged 16) | (Cameroonian Football Federation) Avenir Douala |
| 2 | DF | Ahmad Ngouyamsa | 21 December 2000 (aged 16) | (Cameroonian Football Federation) Isaac Academy |
| 3 | DF | Luc Marcel Obam | 21 February 2000 (aged 17) | (Cameroonian Football Federation) AS Dauphin |
| 4 | DF | Christian Dyo Ngakole | 22 November 2001 (aged 15) | (Cameroonian Football Federation) Coton Sport FC |
| 5 | FW | Kevin Ndongo Ndongo | 12 November 2000 (aged 16) | (Cameroonian Football Federation) AS Oxygène |
| 6 | MF | Wilitty Younoussa | 9 September 2001 (aged 15) | (Cameroonian Football Federation) Tcholere FC |
| 7 | FW | Rosin Christian Bella | 3 October 2000 (aged 16) | (Cameroonian Football Federation) Young Star |
| 8 | MF | Elive Stephen Ewange | 29 October 2000 (aged 16) | (Cameroonian Football Federation) Best Stars |
| 9 | FW | Stéphane Zobo | 2 August 2000 (aged 16) | (Cameroonian Football Federation) Azur Star Inter |
| 10 | MF | Moïse Sakava | 26 December 2000 (aged 16) | (Cameroonian Football Federation) Coton Sport FC |
| 11 | FW | Jules Romaric Messomo Ngah | 15 April 2000 (aged 17) | (Cameroonian Football Federation) Fortuna Yaoundé |
| 12 | DF | Aloys Fouda | 1 May 2000 (aged 17) | (Cameroonian Football Federation) Brasseries |
| 13 | DF | Quentin Junior Ebwelle Ebwelle | 8 May 2001 (aged 16) | (Cameroonian Football Federation) Musango FC |
| 14 | DF | Steve Kingue | 16 October 2001 (aged 15) | (Cameroonian Football Federation) Nkufo Academy |
| 15 | DF | Fabrice Ndzie Mezama | 27 December 2002 (aged 14) | (Cameroonian Football Federation) Fondation Tafi |
| 16 | GK | Boris Junior Essele | 25 January 2000 (aged 17) | (Cameroonian Football Federation) Nkufo Academy |
| 17 | FW | Landry Abessolo Manga | 16 July 2000 (aged 16) | (Cameroonian Football Federation) Brasseries |
| 18 | MF | James Armel Eto'o Eyenga | 19 November 2000 (aged 16) | (Cameroonian Football Federation) Musango FC |
| 19 | FW | Siddiki Aboubakari | 18 March 2000 (aged 17) | (Cameroonian Football Federation) EFORCA |
| 20 | MF | Innocent Assana Nah | 29 July 2000 (aged 16) | (Cameroonian Football Federation) Coton Sport FC |
| 21 | GK | Ulrich Gabriel Nzong | 29 June 2000 (aged 16) | (Cameroonian Football Federation) Alysée Football Academy |

Notes

1. École de Football Reso Champion Académie

=== Gabon ===
Head coach: Pierre Mfoumbi

| No. | Pos. | Player | Date of birth (age) | Club |
|---|---|---|---|---|
| 1 | GK | Brunel Ilagou Ilagou | 5 November 2001 (aged 15) | (Gabonese Football Federation) CF Mounana |
| 2 | DF | Franck Aubert Nze Nsome Amwame | 31 December 2000 (aged 16) | (Gabonese Football Federation) CF Mounana |
| 3 | DF | Elian Christely Boueni Mayobolo | 3 June 2000 (aged 16) | (Gabonese Football Federation) CF Mounana |
| 4 | DF | Aziz Giroly Bourobou Mombo | 21 March 2001 (aged 16) | (Gabonese Football Federation) Académie Club de Libreville |
| 5 | MF | Olabisi Arafat | 16 February 2001 (aged 16) | (Gabonese Football Federation) Académie Club de Libreville |
| 6 | MF | Brimau Kevan Duchamp Nziengui Nziengui | 24 January 2001 (aged 16) | (Gabonese Football Federation) CF Mounana |
| 7 | MF | Kevin Junior Nguechoung | 13 August 2000 (aged 16) | (Gabonese Football Federation) Académie Club de Libreville |
| 8 | FW | Meshak Babanzila | 11 June 2001 (aged 15) | (Gabonese Football Federation) Académie Club de Libreville |
| 9 | FW | Fahd Ndzengue | 7 July 2000 (aged 16) | (Gabonese Football Federation) CF Mounana |
| 10 | FW | Sadidi Abechina Monlade | 14 April 2001 (aged 16) | (Gabonese Football Federation) Académie Club de Libreville |
| 11 | FW | Zico Anderson Eka Nzeng Mba | 27 June 2001 (aged 15) | (Gabonese Football Federation) Académie Club de Libreville |
| 12 | DF | Silvain Mba Edou | 24 July 2002 (aged 14) | (Gabonese Football Federation) Académie Club de Libreville |
| 13 | FW | Azaria Obame | 24 February 2000 (aged 17) | (Gabonese Football Federation) Académie Club de Libreville |
| 14 | FW | Eric Jospin Bekale Biyoghe | 4 March 2000 (aged 17) | (Gabonese Football Federation) CF Mounana |
| 15 | DF | Christophe Ona Nguema | 28 December 2003 (aged 13) | (Gabonese Football Federation) Académie Club de Libreville |
| 16 | GK | Lhin Keartis Bediki Hangoue Kota | 17 June 2000 (aged 16) | (Gabonese Football Federation) Centre Mberie Sportif |
| 17 | MF | Alain Miyogho | 24 October 2000 (aged 16) | (Gabonese Football Federation) AS Mangasport |
| 18 | DF | Brayan Sysi Kassa | 30 October 2000 (aged 16) | (Gabonese Football Federation) AS Val |
| 19 | FW | Clooney Oyouomi Yonni | 12 April 2000 (aged 17) | (Gabonese Football Federation) Bamgombe |
| 20 | MF | Alex Moucketou-Moussounda | 10 October 2000 (aged 16) | (Gabonese Football Federation) Irumba FC |
| 21 | GK | Abdoulaye Coulibaly | 21 January 2000 (aged 17) | (Gabonese Football Federation) Académie Club de Libreville |

=== Ghana ===
Head coach: Samuel Fabin

| No. | Pos. | Player | Date of birth (age) | Club |
|---|---|---|---|---|
| 1 | GK | Ibrahim Danlad | 2 December 2002 (aged 14) | (Ghana Football Association) Asante Kotoko |
| 2 | DF | John Otu | 12 April 2000 (aged 17) | (Ghana Football Association) Dreams FC |
| 3 | DF | Gideon Acquah | 24 May 2000 (aged 16) | (Ghana Football Association) Accra United FC |
| 4 | DF | Edmund Arko-Mensah | 9 September 2001 (aged 15) | (Ghana Football Association) All Stars F.C. |
| 5 | DF | Najeeb Yakubu | 1 May 2000 (aged 17) | (Ghana Football Association) New Town Youth FC |
| 6 | FW | Eric Ayiah | 6 March 2000 (aged 17) | (Ghana Football Association) Charity Stars FC |
| 7 | MF | Ibrahim Sulley | 6 July 2001 (aged 15) | (Ghana Football Association) New Life FC |
| 8 | MF | Isaac Antah | 9 May 2000 (aged 17) | (Ghana Football Association) Young Wise FC |
| 9 | FW | Kwadwo Opoku | 13 July 2001 (aged 15) | (Ghana Football Association) Attram de Visser Soccer Academy FC |
| 10 | MF | Emmanuel Toku | 10 July 2000 (aged 16) | (Ghana Football Association) Cheetah FC |
| 11 | MF | Samuel Mone Andoh | 24 July 2002 (aged 14) | (Ghana Football Association) Zein United FC |
| 12 | DF | Abdul Razak Yusif | 9 August 2001 (aged 15) | (Ghana Football Association) FC Tanga |
| 13 | MF | Gabriel Leveh | 1 April 2000 (aged 17) | (Ghana Football Association) Tema Youth |
| 14 | DF | Bismark Terry Owusu | 30 October 2000 (aged 16) | (Ghana Football Association) Mandela Soccer Academy FC |
| 15 | DF | Faisal Osman | 20 August 2000 (aged 16) | (Ghana Football Association) Kumasi Young Vipers FC |
| 16 | GK | Kwame Aziz | 15 June 2002 (aged 14) | (Ghana Football Association) Mandela Soccer Academy FC |
| 17 | MF | Rashid Alhassan | 20 June 2000 (aged 16) | (Ghana Football Association) Aduana Stars |
| 18 | MF | Mohammed Iddriss | 26 July 2000 (aged 16) | (Ghana Football Association) Cheetah FC |
| 19 | FW | Patmos Arhin | 15 December 2000 (aged 16) | (Ghana Football Association) Mandela Soccer Academy FC |
| 20 | DF | Kingsley Owusu | 3 August 2002 (aged 14) | (Ghana Football Association) Dreams FC |
| 21 | GK | Michael Acquaye | 10 August 2000 (aged 16) | (Ghana Football Association) West African Football Academy SC |

=== Guinea ===
Head coach: Camara Souleymane

| No. | Pos. | Player | Date of birth (age) | Club |
|---|---|---|---|---|
| 1 | GK | Ibrahima Sylla | 7 December 2002 (aged 14) | (Guinean Football Federation) FC Mendy |
| 2 | DF | Samuel Conté | 13 March 2000 (aged 17) | (Guinean Football Federation) Académie Horoya |
| 3 | DF | Ibrahima Sory Soumah | 19 November 2001 (aged 15) | (Guinean Football Federation) Académie Horoya |
| 4 | DF | Mohamed Cherif Camara | 21 October 2002 (aged 14) | (Guinean Football Federation) Académie St Marie |
| 5 | DF | Issiaga Camara | 30 December 2002 (aged 14) | (Guinean Football Federation) Académie Hafia |
| 6 | MF | Sékou Camara | 27 July 2001 (aged 15) | (Guinean Football Federation) Académie St Marie |
| 7 | FW | Fandjé Touré | 1 November 2002 (aged 14) | (Guinean Football Federation) CEFOMIG |
| 8 | FW | Aboubacar Lapé Bangoura | 31 December 2000 (aged 16) | (Guinean Football Federation) Académie Foot Conakry |
| 9 | FW | Facinet Doss Soumah | 6 February 2000 (aged 17) | (Guinean Football Federation) CEFOMIG |
| 10 | MF | Aguibou Camara | 20 May 2001 (aged 15) | (Guinean Football Federation) Académie Foot Conakry |
| 11 | DF | Djibril Sylla | 10 November 2002 (aged 14) | (Guinean Football Federation) Académie Horoya |
| 12 | DF | M'Bemba Camara | 8 September 2000 (aged 16) | (Guinean Football Federation) Académie ASKaloum |
| 13 | MF | Seydouba Cissé | 10 February 2001 (aged 16) | (Guinean Football Federation) FC Attouga |
| 14 | MF | Salia Bangoura | 15 November 2001 (aged 15) | (Guinean Football Federation) CEFOMIG |
| 15 | MF | Mohamed Blaise Camara | 11 March 2000 (aged 17) | (Guinean Football Federation) Espérence Conakry |
| 16 | GK | Abdoulaye Doumbouya | 1 September 2001 (aged 15) | (Guinean Football Federation) Académie Foot Conakry |
| 17 | DF | Ismael Traoré | 10 June 2000 (aged 16) | (Guinean Football Federation) Académie Sequence |
| 18 | MF | Elhadj Bah | 22 August 2001 (aged 15) | (Guinean Football Federation) Espérence Kaloum |
| 19 | MF | Ibrahim Camara | 12 September 2000 (aged 16) | Unattached |
| 20 | FW | Gerard Sella Bangoura | 23 March 2000 (aged 17) | (French Football Federation) AS Saint-Étienne |
| 21 | GK | Mohamed Camara | 16 March 2000 (aged 17) | (Guinean Football Federation) Académie Titi |

== Group B ==
=== Angola ===
Head coach: Simão Sebastião Cose José

| No. | Pos. | Player | Date of birth (age) | Club |
|---|---|---|---|---|
| 1 | GK | Nsesani Emanuel Simão | 5 November 2000 (aged 16) | (Angolan Football Federation) Primeiro de Agosto |
| 2 | DF | Capitão António José | 8 December 2000 (aged 16) | (Angolan Football Federation) A.F.A. |
| 3 | DF | Miguel Anselmo Basílio Daniel | 28 January 2000 (aged 17) | (Angolan Football Federation) A.F.A. |
| 4 | DF | Euclides Moisés Fernando dos Santos | 18 January 2000 (aged 17) | (Angolan Football Federation) Petro de Luanda |
| 5 | MF | Fausto Mário Maurício Ngumba | 26 October 2000 (aged 16) | (Angolan Football Federation) Primeiro de Agosto |
| 6 | MF | Fiete Quintas Agostinho dos Santos | 27 September 2000 (aged 16) | (Angolan Football Federation) Primeiro de Agosto |
| 7 | FW | Camilo Mbule Ngongue | 7 December 2001 (aged 15) | (Angolan Football Federation) Académica do Lobito |
| 8 | MF | Orlando Luís Secali | 4 February 2001 (aged 16) | (Angolan Football Federation) Primeiro de Agosto |
| 9 | FW | Jelson João Mivo | 21 April 2000 (aged 17) | (Angolan Football Federation) Primeiro de Agosto |
| 10 | MF | Pedro Agostinho | 30 July 2000 (aged 16) | (Angolan Football Federation) Petro de Luanda |
| 11 | DF | Ramiro João Paulo | 20 April 2001 (aged 16) | (Angolan Football Federation) A.F.A. |
| 12 | GK | Job Bengue Kamalandua | 22 November 2002 (aged 14) | (Angolan Football Federation) Primeiro de Agosto |
| 13 | FW | Melono Muondo Dala | 25 August 2001 (aged 15) | (Angolan Football Federation) Primeiro de Agosto |
| 14 | FW | Cláudio Macalo Viegas | 6 April 2001 (aged 16) | (Angolan Football Federation) Progresso do Sambizanga |
| 15 | MF | Benedito Cuzanda Vissoco | 10 May 2001 (aged 16) | (Angolan Football Federation) Primeiro de Agosto |
| 16 | DF | Benjino Ribeiro Benjamim | 9 January 2000 (aged 17) | (Angolan Football Federation) A.F.A. |
| 17 | FW | Abílio Mateus Contreiras | 18 September 2000 (aged 16) | (Angolan Football Federation) Primeiro de Agosto |
| 18 | DF | Adalmiro Patrício Pacheco da Silva | 6 January 2000 (aged 17) | (Angolan Football Federation) Primeiro de Agosto |
| 19 | FW | Francisco Carlos Chilumbo | 25 December 2000 (aged 16) | (Angolan Football Federation) Académica do Lobito |
| 20 | MF | Armando Martins Manuel dos Santos | 19 June 2000 (aged 16) | (Angolan Football Federation) Domant FC |
| 21 | DF | Moisés Pedro Amor | 28 February 2000 (aged 17) | (Angolan Football Federation) Académica do Lobito |

=== Mali ===
Head coach: Jonas Kokou Komla

| No. | Pos. | Player | Date of birth (age) | Club |
|---|---|---|---|---|
| 1 | GK | Alkalifa Coulibaly | 3 December 2001 (aged 15) | (Malian Football Federation) AS Olympique de Missira |
| 2 | DF | Felix Kamaté | 31 December 2000 (aged 16) | (Malian Football Federation) AS Olympique de Missira |
| 3 | DF | Djemoussa Traoré | 20 January 2000 (aged 17) | (Malian Football Federation) ALOB |
| 4 | DF | Fode Konaté | 2 December 2000 (aged 16) | (Malian Football Federation) AS Bamako |
| 5 | DF | Mamadi Fofana | 11 November 2000 (aged 16) | (Malian Football Federation) FC Diarra |
| 6 | MF | Mohamed Camara | 6 January 2000 (aged 17) | (Malian Football Federation) AS Real Bamako |
| 7 | FW | Hadji Dramé | 10 September 2000 (aged 16) | (Malian Football Federation) Yeelen Olympique |
| 8 | MF | Abdoulaye Dabo | 20 July 2000 (aged 16) | (Malian Football Federation) Africa Foot Academy |
| 9 | FW | Seme Camara | 25 November 2000 (aged 16) | (Malian Football Federation) FC Diarra |
| 10 | FW | Abdoul Salam Ag Jiddou | 1 February 2000 (aged 17) | (Malian Football Federation) Guidars FC |
| 11 | MF | Mamadou Traoré | 3 April 2002 (aged 15) | (Malian Football Federation) Stade Malien |
| 12 | MF | Seybou Senou | 20 December 2001 (aged 15) | (Qatar Football Association) Aspire Academy |
| 13 | MF | Amadou Diako | 30 November 2000 (aged 16) | (Malian Football Federation) AS Bakaridjan |
| 14 | FW | Sibiry Keita | 30 January 2001 (aged 16) | (Qatar Football Association) Aspire Academy |
| 15 | DF | Abdoulaye Diaby | 4 July 2000 (aged 16) | (Malian Football Federation) Djoliba AC |
| 16 | GK | Youssouf Koïta | 27 August 2000 (aged 16) | (Malian Football Federation) AS Bamako |
| 17 | MF | Mamadou Samaké | 15 May 2000 (aged 16) | (Malian Football Federation) Yeelen Olympique |
| 18 | MF | Ibrahim Kane | 23 June 2000 (aged 16) | (Malian Football Federation) Black Star |
| 19 | FW | Lassana N'Diaye | 3 October 2000 (aged 16) | (Malian Football Federation) AS Real Bamako |
| 20 | MF | Cheick Doucouré | 8 January 2000 (aged 17) | (Malian Football Federation) AS Real Bamako |
| 21 | GK | Massiré Gassama | 23 August 2000 (aged 16) | (Malian Football Federation) Black Star |

=== Niger ===
Head coach: Hamidou Harouna

| No. | Pos. | Player | Date of birth (age) | Club |
|---|---|---|---|---|
| 1 | GK | Moussa Laouali Hima | 13 December 2000 (aged 16) | (Nigerien Football Federation) AS-GNN |
| 2 | FW | Yacine Wa Massamba | 9 March 2000 (aged 17) | (Nigerien Football Federation) ASN NIGELEC |
| 3 | DF | Mahamadou Mahamane Ousmane | 12 October 2001 (aged 15) | (Nigerien Football Federation) ASN NIGELEC |
| 4 | DF | Abdoul Nasser Mahaman Bello Hassane | 24 September 2000 (aged 16) | (Nigerien Football Federation) Air Academy |
| 5 | DF | Farouk Idrissa | 12 February 2000 (aged 17) | (Nigerien Football Federation) AS Lazaret |
| 6 | MF | Ismael Issaka Magagi | 1 January 2000 (aged 17) | (Nigerien Football Federation) AS CBK |
| 7 | MF | Sountalma Sidibe Assoumane | 20 January 2002 (aged 15) | (Nigerien Football Federation) Sahel SC |
| 8 | MF | Habibou Sofiane | 1 January 2000 (aged 17) | (Nigerien Football Federation) AS Renaissance |
| 9 | MF | Kairou Amoustapha | 1 January 2001 (aged 16) | (Nigerien Football Federation) ASN NIGELEC |
| 10 | MF | Rachid Alfari Souley | 30 December 2000 (aged 16) | (Nigerien Football Federation) ASN NIGELEC |
| 11 | MF | Abdoul Karim Tinni Sanda | 21 January 2001 (aged 16) | (Nigerien Football Federation) Sahel SC |
| 12 | DF | Djibrilla Ibrahim Mossi | 2 March 2002 (aged 15) | (Nigerien Football Federation) AS Douanes |
| 13 | MF | Yacouba Aboubacar | 1 January 2000 (aged 17) | (Nigerien Football Federation) JS Tahoua |
| 14 | DF | Inoussa Amadou Darenkoum | 5 September 2000 (aged 16) | (Nigerien Football Federation) Saca Sport |
| 15 | DF | Abdoul Rachid Soumana Moussa | 1 January 2000 (aged 17) | (Ghana Football Association) Tudu Mighty Jets F.C. |
| 16 | GK | Abdoulaye Boubacar Adamou | 1 January 2001 (aged 16) | (Nigerien Football Federation) Apo River Academy |
| 17 | FW | Ibrahim Marou | 1 January 2000 (aged 17) | (Nigerien Football Federation) AS Sonintcha |
| 18 | DF | Ibrahim Namata | 10 May 2000 (aged 17) | (Nigerien Football Federation) AS Sonintcha |
| 19 | FW | Mamane Sani Boube Moussa | 13 November 2000 (aged 16) | (Nigerien Football Federation) Jangorzo FC |
| 20 | FW | Hamid Galissoune Ajina | 26 January 2000 (aged 17) | (Nigerien Football Federation) Saca Sport |
| 21 | GK | Khaled Lawali Ibrahim | 15 July 2000 (aged 16) | (Nigerien Football Federation) Sahel SC |

=== Tanzania ===
Head coach: Bakari Nyundo Shime S

| No. | Pos. | Player | Date of birth (age) | Club |
|---|---|---|---|---|
| 1 | GK | Ramadhani Awam Kabwili | 11 December 2000 (aged 16) | Unattached |
| 2 | MF | Ally Hamis Ng'anzi | 3 September 2000 (aged 16) | Unattached |
| 3 | FW | Nickson Kibabage | 12 October 2000 (aged 16) | Unattached |
| 4 | DF | Enrick Vitaris Nkosi | 15 January 2000 (aged 17) | Unattached |
| 5 | DF | Dickson Job | 29 December 2000 (aged 16) | Unattached |
| 6 | DF | Issa Abdi Makamba | 13 April 2001 (aged 16) | Unattached |
| 7 | MF | Said Mussa Bakari | 11 August 2000 (aged 16) | Unattached |
| 8 | MF | Syprian Benidictor Mtesigwa | 9 June 2000 (aged 16) | Unattached |
| 9 | FW | Abdul Hamisi Suleiman | 26 February 2001 (aged 16) | Unattached |
| 10 | FW | Asad Ali Juma | 15 April 2001 (aged 16) | Unattached |
| 11 | FW | Mohamed Abdallah Rashid | 12 June 2001 (aged 15) | Unattached |
| 12 | FW | Kibwana Ally Shomari | 1 January 2000 (aged 17) | Unattached |
| 13 | MF | Shabani Zuberi Ada | 24 November 2001 (aged 15) | Unattached |
| 14 | DF | Ally Msengi | 20 December 2001 (aged 15) | Unattached |
| 15 | FW | Yohana Mkomola | 18 April 2000 (aged 17) | Unattached |
| 16 | FW | Israel Patrick Mwenda | 10 March 2000 (aged 17) | Unattached |
| 17 | FW | Ibrahim Abdalla Ali | 8 September 2000 (aged 16) | Unattached |
| 18 | GK | Samwel Edward Brazio | 28 June 2000 (aged 16) | Unattached |
| 19 | FW | Muhsin Malima Makame | 10 December 2000 (aged 16) | Unattached |
| 20 | MF | Kelvin Nashon Naftal | 2 August 2000 (aged 16) | Unattached |
| 21 | GK | Kelvin Deogratias Kayego | 5 June 2001 (aged 15) | Unattached |
