= 2017 U-17 Africa Cup of Nations =

2017 Africa U-17 Cup of Nations
Coupe d'Afrique des nations des moins de 17 ans 2017

Tournament details
- Host country: Gabon
- Dates: 14–28 May
- Teams: 8 (from 1 confederation)
- Venues: 2 (in 2 host cities)

Final positions
- Champions: Mali (2nd title)
- Runners-up: Ghana
- Third place: Guinea
- Fourth place: Niger

Tournament statistics
- Matches played: 16
- Goals scored: 41 (2.56 per match)
- Top scorer(s): (Guinea) Fandjé Touré (6 goals)

The 2017 Africa U-17 Cup of Nations, officially known as the Total U-17 Africa Cup Of Nations, Gabon 2017, was the 12th edition of the Africa U-17 Cup of Nations (17th edition if tournaments without hosts are included), the biennial international youth football tournament organized by the Confederation of African Football (CAF) for players aged 17 and below.

The top four teams qualified for the 2017 FIFA U-17 World Cup in India.

== Host selection ==
The tournament was originally set to take place in Madagascar between 2–16 April 2017. However, the CAF Executive Committee decided on 12 January 2017 to withdraw the hosting rights from Madagascar following the reports of the CAF inspection teams.

On 3 February 2017, Gabon were selected as the new hosts, and the tournament was changed to 14 to 28 May 2017 (originally from 21 May to 4 June 2017).

== Qualification ==
The qualifiers were played between June and October 2016. At the end of the qualification phase, seven teams joined the hosts Gabon.

=== Player eligibility ===
Players born 1 January 2000 or later are eligible to participate in the competition.

=== Qualified teams ===
Gabon replaced Madagascar due to their selection as the new hosts. Moreover, Tanzania replaced Congo due to a Congolese player failing to turn up for a Magnetic Resonance Imaging test. Mali were cleared to compete after their suspension was lifted by FIFA on 28 April 2017.

Note: All appearance statistics count only those since the introduction of final tournament in 1995.

Team	Appearance	Previous best appearance
Angola	3rd	Group stage (1997, 1999)
Cameroon	6th	Champions (2003)
Gabon (hosts)	3rd	Group stage (2007, 2013)
Ghana	7th	Champions (1995, 1999)
Guinea	6th	Third place (1995, 2015)
Mali	8th	Champions (2015)
Niger	2nd	Group stage (2015)
Tanzania	1st	Debut

== Venues ==
The two venues were confirmed in March 2017.

Libreville	2017 U-17 Africa Cup of Nations is located in Gabon	Port-Gentil
Stade de l'Amitié	2017 U-17 Africa Cup of Nations is located in Gabon	Stade de Port-Gentil
Capacity: 40,000	2017 U-17 Africa Cup of Nations is located in Gabon	Capacity: 20,000
0.524167°N 9.397778°E	2017 U-17 Africa Cup of Nations is located in Gabon	0.716667°S 8.783333°E

Original venues of Madagascar before hosts were withdrawn.

Stadium	City	Capacity
Mahamasina Stadium	Antananarivo	22,000
Vontovorona Sport Complex	Vontovorona	?

== Draw ==
The draw for the tournament took place on 24 October 2016, 11:00 local time (UTC+2) at the CAF Headquarters in Cairo.

The teams were seeded based on the results of the last edition (final tournament and qualifiers).

Level 1	Level 2	Level 3	Level 4
Gabon (replaced Madagascar after draw) (host, assigned to A1); Mali (2015 winner, assigned to B1)	Guinea; Niger	Cameroon; Angola	Ghana; Tanzania (replaced Congo after draw)

== Squads ==
Each squad can contain a maximum of 21 players.

== Match officials ==
A total of 14 referees and 15 assistant referees were selected for the tournament.

Referees	(Egypt) Mohamed Maarouf Eid; (Djibouti) Souleiman Ahmed Djamal; (Nigeria) Ferdinand Udoh Aniete; (Algeria) Mustapha Ghorbal; (Gabon) Mihindou Mbina Gauthier; (Ivory Coast) Abou Coulibaly; (Madagascar) Hamada Nampiandraza; (Burundi) Pacifique Ndabihawenimana; (Kenya) Davies Ogenche Omweno; (Somalia) Hassan Mohamed Hagi; (Senegal) Maguette Ndiaye; (Democratic Republic of the Congo) Jean-Jacques Ndala
Reserve Referees	(Tunisia) Haithem Kossai; (Ghana) Daniel Nii Laryea
Assistant Referees	(Egypt) Mahmoud Abouelregal; (Tunisia) Aymen Ismail; (Burkina Faso) Seydou Tiama; (Gabon) Moussounda Montel; (Lesotho) Souru Phatsoane; (Seychelles) Gilbert Lista; (Benin) Gbèmassiandan Kouton; (Mozambique) Arsénio Marengula; (Morocco) Lahcen Azgaou; (Niger) Abdoul Aziz Moctar Saley; (Guinea) Mamady Tere; (Tanzania) Frank John Komba; (Ethiopia) Temesgin Samuel Atango; (Comoros) Soulaimane Amaldine
Reserve Assistant Referee	(Libya) Attia Amsaad

== Group stage ==
The group winners and runners-up advance to the semi-finals and qualify for the 2017 FIFA U-17 World Cup.

Tiebreakers

The teams were ranked according to points (3 points for a win, 1 point for a draw, 0 points for a loss). If tied on points, tiebreakers were applied in the following order:

1. Number of points obtained in matches between the teams concerned;
2. Goal difference in matches between the teams concerned;
3. Goals scored in matches between the teams concerned;
4. If, after applying criteria 1 to 3 to several teams, two teams still had an equal ranking, criteria 1 to 3 were reapplied exclusively to the matches between the two teams in question to determine their final rankings. If this procedure did not lead to a decision, criteria 5 to 7 applied;
5. Goal difference in all matches;
6. Goals scored in all matches;
7. Drawing of lots.

All times are local, WAT (UTC+1).

=== Group A ===
Pos	Team	Pld	W	D	L	GF	GA	GD	Pts	Qualification
1	Ghana	3	2	1	0	9	0	+9	7	Knockout stage and 2017 FIFA U-17 World Cup
2	Guinea	3	1	2	0	6	2	+4	5	Knockout stage and 2017 FIFA U-17 World Cup
3	Cameroon	3	1	1	1	2	5	−3	4	
4	Gabon (H)	3	0	0	3	1	11	−10	0	

Source: CAF
Rules for classification: Group stage tiebreakers
(H) Hosts
14 May 2017
15:30

Gabon	1–5	Guinea
Moubeti 70'	Report	Touré 7', 38', 69'; Bah 30'; A. Camara 45+1'

Stade de Port-Gentil, Port-Gentil
Referee: Davies Ogenche Omweno (Kenya)
14 May 2017
18:30

Cameroon	0–4	Ghana
	Report	Ayiah 25', 64'; Sulley 32', 34'

Stade de Port-Gentil, Port-Gentil
Referee: Mohamed Maarouf Eid (Egypt)

17 May 2017
15:30

Guinea	1–1	Cameroon
Touré 22'	Report	Zobo 68'

Stade de Port-Gentil, Port-Gentil
Referee: Maguette Ndiaye (Senegal)
17 May 2017
18:30

Ghana	5–0	Gabon
Ayiah 30', 57'; Toku 34', 67'; Arhin 76'	Report

Stade de Port-Gentil, Port-Gentil
Referee: Pacifique Ndabihawenimana (Burundi)

20 May 2017
18:30

Gabon	0–1	Cameroon
	Report	Zobo 20'

Stade de Port-Gentil, Port-Gentil
Referee: Mustapha Ghorbal (Algeria)
20 May 2017
18:30

Guinea	0–0	Ghana
	Report

Stade de l'Amitié Sino-Gabonaise, Libreville
Referee: Hamada Nampiandraza (Madagascar)

=== Group B ===
Pos	Team	Pld	W	D	L	GF	GA	GD	Pts	Qualification
1	Mali	3	2	1	0	8	2	+6	7	Knockout stage and 2017 FIFA U-17 World Cup
2	Niger	3	1	1	1	4	4	0	4	Knockout stage and 2017 FIFA U-17 World Cup
3	Tanzania	3	1	1	1	2	2	0	4	
4	Angola	3	0	1	2	4	10	−6	1	

Source: CAF
Rules for classification: Group stage tiebreakers
15 May 2017
15:30

Mali	0–0	Tanzania
	Report

Stade de l'Amitié Sino-Gabonaise, Libreville
Referee: Ferdinand Udoh Aniete (Nigeria)
15 May 2017
18:30

Angola	2–2	Niger
Melo 68'; Gelson 84' (pen.)	Report	Sanda 29' (pen.), 42'

Stade de l'Amitié Sino-Gabonaise, Libreville
Referee: Mihindou Mbina Gauthier (Gabon)

18 May 2017
15:30

Tanzania	2–1	Angola
Naftal 6'; Suleiman 70'	Report	Tombé 18'

Stade de l'Amitié Sino-Gabonaise, Libreville
Referee: Abou Coulibaly (Ivory Coast)
18 May 2017
18:30

Niger	1–2	Mali
Habibou 35'	Report	Dramé 6'; M. Camara 44'

Stade de l'Amitié Sino-Gabonaise, Libreville
Referee: Jean-Jacques Ndala (Democratic Republic of the Congo)

21 May 2017
18:30

Mali	6–1	Angola
S. Camara 2'; Dramé 14', 72'; N'Diaye 39', 70'; Kané 81'	Report	Melo 83'

Stade de l'Amitié Sino-Gabonaise, Libreville
Referee: Hassan Mohamed Hagi (Somalia)
21 May 2017
18:30

Tanzania	0–1	Niger
	Report	Marou 42'

Stade de Port-Gentil, Port-Gentil
Referee: Daniel Nii Laryea (Ghana)

== Knockout stage ==
In the knockout stages, if a match was level at the end of normal playing time, a penalty shoot-out was used to determine the winner (no extra time was played).

=== Bracket ===
Semi-finals
24 May – Port-Gentil
Ghana (p)	0 (6)
Niger	0 (5)
24 May – Libreville
Mali (p)	0 (2)
Guinea	0 (0)

Final
28 May – Libreville
Ghana	0
Mali	1
Third place
28 May – Libreville
Niger	1
Guinea	3

=== Semi-finals ===
24 May 2017
15:30

Ghana	0–0	Niger
	Report
Penalties
Owusu (penalty scored); Acquah (penalty scored); Iddriss (penalty scored); Ayiah (penalty missed); Osman (penalty scored); Sulley (penalty scored); Toku (penalty scored)	6–5	(penalty scored) Habibou; (penalty scored) Ajina; (penalty missed) Massamba; (penalty scored) Magagi; (penalty scored) Namata; (penalty scored) Souley; (penalty missed) Mossi

Stade de Port-Gentil, Port-Gentil
Referee: Mustapha Ghorbal (Algeria)

24 May 2017
18:30

Mali	0–0	Guinea
	Report
Penalties
Dramé (penalty scored); M. Camara (penalty missed); Konaté (penalty scored)	2–0	(penalty missed) I. Soumah; (penalty missed) Conté; (penalty missed) F. Soumah; (penalty missed) Touré

Stade de l'Amitié Sino-Gabonaise, Libreville
Referee: Davies Ogenche Omweno (Kenya)

=== Third place match ===
28 May 2017
15:30

Niger	1–3	Guinea
Marou 66'	Report	Touré 55', 75'; Bah 73'

Stade de l'Amitié Sino-Gabonaise, Libreville
Referee: Mihindou Mbina Gauthier (Gabon)

=== Final ===
28 May 2017
18:30

Ghana	0–1	Mali
	Report	Samaké 22'

Stade de l'Amitié Sino-Gabonaise, Libreville
Referee: Hamada Nampiandraza (Madagascar)

== Goalscorers ==
6 goals

- (Guinea) Djibril Touré

4 goals

- (Ghana) Eric Ayiah

3 goals

- (Mali) Hadji Dramé

2 goals

- (Angola) Melo
- (Cameroon) Stéphane Zobo
- (Ghana) Ibrahim Sulley
- (Ghana) Emmanuel Toku
- (Guinea) Elhadj Bah
- (Mali) Lassana N'Diaye
- (Niger) Ibrahim Marou
- (Niger) Abdoul Karim Sanda

1 goal

- (Angola) Gelson
- (Angola) Tombé
- (Gabon) Fahd Moubeti
- (Ghana) Patmos Arhin
- (Guinea) Aguibou Camara
- (Mali) Mohamed Camara
- (Mali) Semé Camara
- (Mali) Ibrahim Kané
- (Mali) Mamadou Samaké
- (Niger) Sofiane Habibou
- (Tanzania) Kelvin Naftal
- (Tanzania) Abdul Suleiman

== Qualified teams for FIFA U-17 World Cup ==
The following four teams from CAF qualified for the 2017 FIFA U-17 World Cup.

Team	Qualified on	Previous appearances in tournament^{1}
Mali	21 May 2017	4 (1997, 1999, 2001, 2015)
Ghana	17 May 2017	8 (1989, **1991**, 1993, **1995**, 1997, 1999, 2005, 2007)
Guinea	20 May 2017	4 (1985, 1989, 1995, 2015)
Niger	21 May 2017	0 (Debut)

^{1} Bold indicates champion for that year. Italic indicates host for that year.
