= 2017 FIFA U-17 World Cup =

२०१७ फीफा अंडर-१७ विश्व कप

Tournament details
- Host country: India
- Dates: 6–28 October
- Teams: 24 (from 6 confederations)
- Venues: 6 (in 6 host cities)

Final positions
- Champions: England (1st title)
- Runners-up: Spain
- Third place: Brazil
- Fourth place: Mali

Tournament statistics
- Matches played: 52
- Goals scored: 183 (3.52 per match)
- Attendance: 1,347,133 (25,906 per match)
- Top scorer: (England) Rhian Brewster (8 goals)
- Best player: (England) Phil Foden
- Best goalkeeper: (Brazil) Gabriel Brazão
- Fair play award: Brazil

The 2017 FIFA U-17 World Cup was the 17th FIFA U-17 World Cup, a biennial international football tournament contested by men's under-17 national teams. Organised by FIFA, the tournament took place in India from 6 to 28 October 2017, after the country was awarded the hosting rights on 5 December 2013. This marked the first time India hosted a FIFA tournament and the fifth Asian country to host U-17 World Cup after China in 1985, Japan in 1993, South Korea in 2007 and the United Arab Emirates in 2013. The attendance for this World Cup was a record 1,347,133, surpassing China's record in 1985 with 1,230,976.

The matches were played in six stadiums in six host cities around the country, with the final taking place at the Salt Lake Stadium in Kolkata. Twenty-three teams, besides the host India, managed to qualify for the tournament via participating in their various continental under-17 tournaments. In the first round of the tournament finals, the teams competed in round-robin groups of four for points, where the top two teams in each group along with the top four third placed teams would advance to the next round. These 16 teams will advance to the knockout stage, where three rounds of play decided which teams would participate in the final.

England won the U-17 World Cup for the first time after coming back from a two-goal deficit and beating Spain 5–2 in the final. This made England the second nation, after Brazil in 2003, to win both of FIFA's male age-capped (U-20 and U-17) World Cups in the same calendar year. (The women's equivalent of the feat was previously achieved once, by North Korea in 2016.) The official match ball used in the tournament was the Adidas Krasava.

== Host selection ==
The bidding procedure to host the tournament began on 17 March 2013, with the deadline falling on 15 November 2013. On 28 May 2013 it was announced by FIFA that Azerbaijan, India, the Republic of Ireland, and Uzbekistan had submitted bids for the hosting rights.

During the meeting of the FIFA Council on 5 December 2013, it was revealed that India had won the 2017 FIFA World Cup hosting rights.

== Qualified teams ==
As the hosts, India made their first ever appearance at the FIFA U-17 World Cup and their first appearance in the World Cup at any age level. As well as India, New Caledonia and Niger also made their debuts in the FIFA U-17 World Cup.

The previous U-17 World Cup title holders, Nigeria, failed to qualify for this edition, becoming the first nation since Switzerland in 2009 to fail to participate for the next edition of the FIFA U-17 World Cup after winning the previous edition.

A total of 24 teams qualified for the final tournament. In addition to India, the other 23 teams qualified from six separate continental competitions. Starting from 2017, the Oceania Football Confederation (OFC) received an additional spot (in total two spots), while UEFA dropped from having six spots to five.

Confederation	Qualifying Tournament	Qualifier(s)
AFC (Asia)	Host Nation	India^{1}
AFC (Asia)	2016 AFC U-16 Championship	Iraq; Iran; Japan; North Korea
CAF (Africa)	2017 Africa U-17 Cup of Nations	Ghana; Guinea; Mali; Niger^{1}
CONCACAF (Central, North America and Caribbean)	2017 CONCACAF U-17 Championship	Costa Rica; Honduras; Mexico; United States
CONMEBOL (South America)	2017 South American Under-17 Championship	Brazil; Chile; Colombia; Paraguay
OFC (Oceania)	2017 OFC U-17 Championship	New Caledonia^{1} New Zealand
UEFA (Europe)	2017 UEFA European Under-17 Championship	England; France; Germany; Spain; Turkey

1.Teams that will make their debut.

== Organization ==
=== Preparation ===
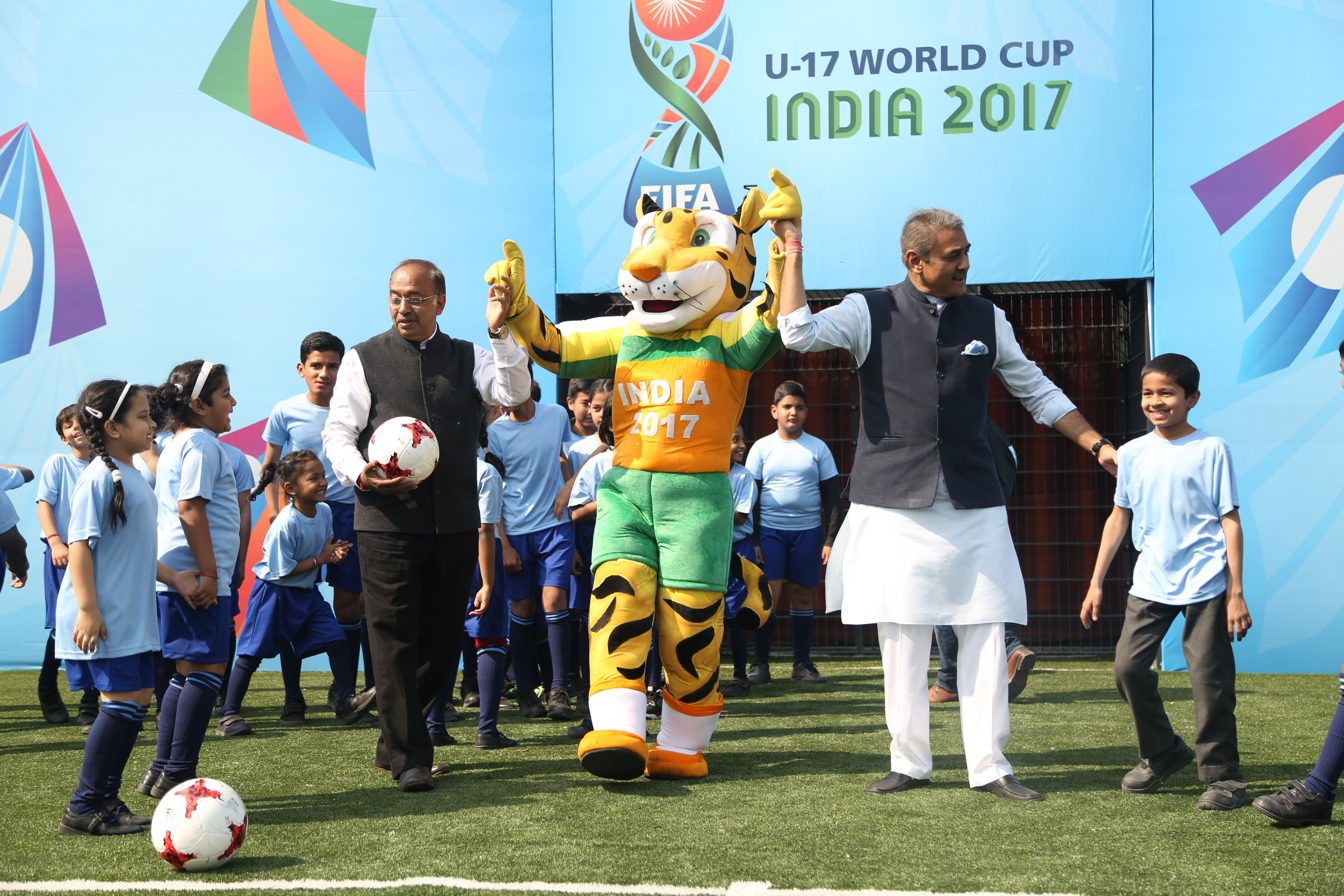
Vijay Goel and Praful Patel at MXIM Launch

The six venues selected for the tournament were given major renovations prior to the FIFA U-17 World Cup. All the stadiums were given new bucket seats, new dressing rooms, new evacuation exits for fans, and new training grounds. Javier Ceppi, the Local Organising Committee director, stated that despite work starting slowly, things eventually became quicker. "It has been a long process in the last two and half years. In India, it takes time to start things but once things start it kind of picks its own pace and in terms of implementation I always say that India is a very good country when it comes to implementation."

=== Emblem ===
The official emblem for the tournament was revealed on 27 September 2016 at a hotel in Goa during the 2016 AFC U-16 Championship. According to the press release from FIFA, the emblem was designed "as a celebration of the country's richness and diversity of cultures, with the main elements of the Indian Ocean, the banyan tree, the kite and the starburst, which is an interpretation of the Ashoka Chakra, an integral part of the national identity."

=== Tickets ===
Sales of tickets for the FIFA U-17 World Cup began on 16 May 2017 during a function in New Delhi. Carles Puyol was present during the launch of the ticket sales as a special guest. General ticket sales officially began on 17 May 2017 at 19:11. The time was selected as a tribute to when Mohun Bagan defeated East Yorkshire Regiment in the IFA Shield in 1911, marking the first time an Indian football club defeated a British side in British India. Tickets for the tournament were sold in four phases: Phase one only sold tickets for categories 1 to 3 at each venue with a 60% discount while phase two allowed people to buy tickets for all categories, but only if you are a Visa card holder, at a 50% discount. Phase three allowed anyone to buy tickets with a 25% discount while phase four had tickets at full price. The attendance for matches breached the million mark in the final match of the Round of 16, which made India only the third nation after China and Mexico to register an attendance of over a million for the event. On 28 October 2017, in the 3rd place match-up between Brazil and Mali, India surpassed the existing record of 1,230,976 set in the 1985 FIFA U-16 World Championship edition in China The final attendance figures were 1,347,133.

=== Mascot ===
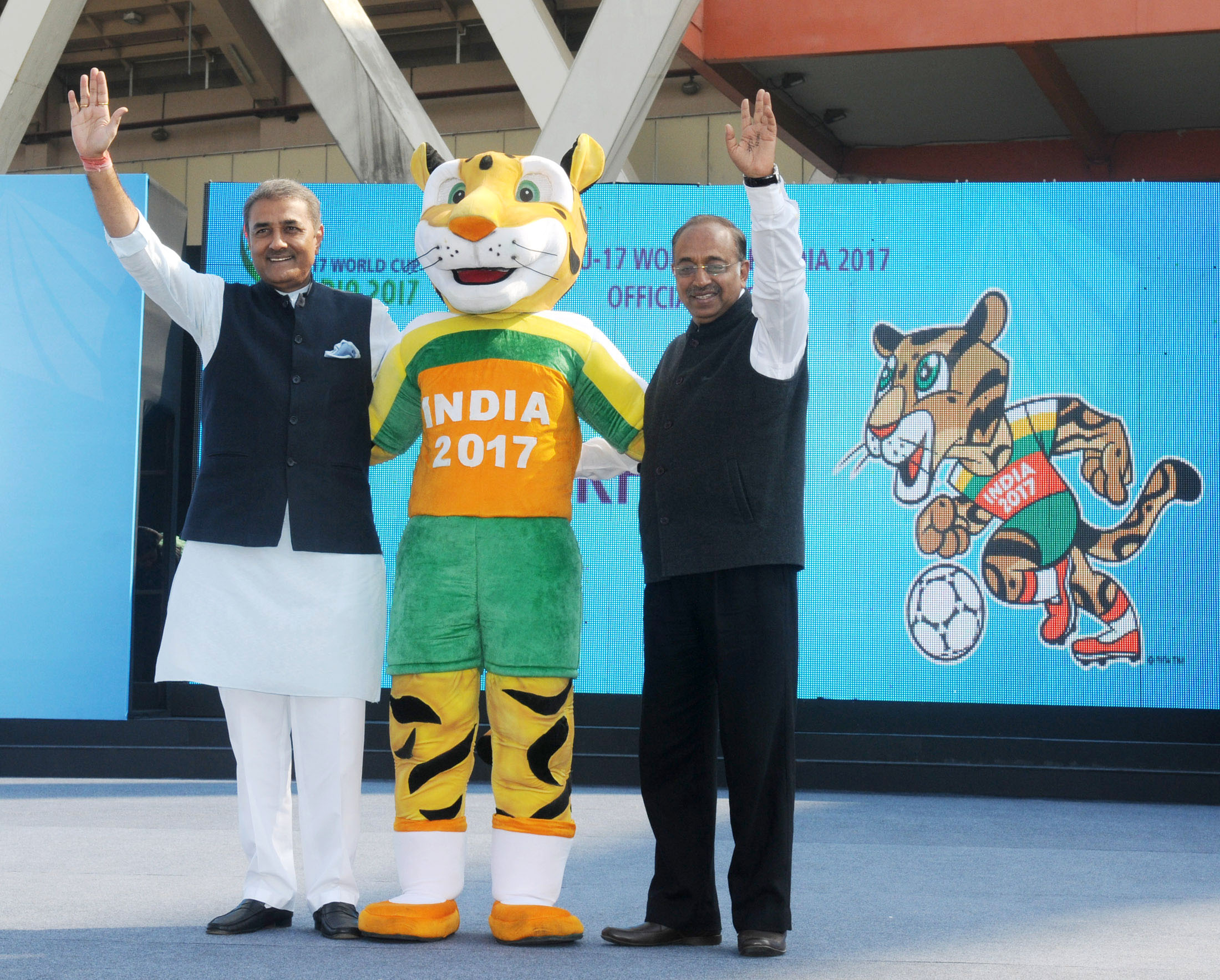
Vijay Goel and Praful Patel with the mascot, Kheleo

The mascot is "Kheleo", a Himalayan Clouded Leopard. He wears a jersey with the colours of white, yellow, green and orange. The Minister of Youth Affairs and Sports, Vijay Goel, stated: "Kheleo is young, vibrant, enthustiatic and a perfect representation of our country. He will help us to involve kids in football in a fun way".

=== Theme song ===
The official theme song for the 2017 U17 World Cup was called 'Kar Ke Dikhla De Goal' (कर के दिखला दे गोल) which roughly translates to 'Show that you can score a goal', composed by Pritam and written by Amitabh Bhattacharya. The official music video featured Indian football legend Bhaichung Bhutia along with Kerala Blasters co-owner Sachin Tendulkar and singer Babul Supriyo.

== Venues ==
After being awarded the hosting rights for the FIFA U-17 World Cup, eight locations were shortlisted: Bangalore, Guwahati, Kochi, Kolkata, Margao, Navi Mumbai, New Delhi and Pune. On 29 May 2015, Kochi, Mumbai, Kolkata, and Guwahati were provisionally selected as host locations and was informed two more would be provisionally approved from the list of Bengaluru, Chennai, Goa, New Delhi and Pune. On 27 October 2016, FIFA officially announced Guwahati, Kochi, Kolkata, Margao, Navi Mumbai and New Delhi as the official host cities for the FIFA U-17 World Cup.

Kolkata	Kochi	New Delhi
Salt Lake Stadium (Vivekananda Yuba Bharati Krirangan)	Jawaharlal Nehru Stadium (Jawaharlal Nehru International Stadium)	Jawaharlal Nehru Stadium
Capacity: 66,600	Capacity: 41,700	Capacity: 58,000
2017 FIFA U-17 World Cup is located in India
Navi Mumbai	Guwahati	Margao
DY Patil Stadium (Dr. DY Patil Stadium)	Indira Gandhi Athletic Stadium	Fatorda Stadium (Pandit Jawaharlal Nehru Stadium)
Capacity: 41,000	Capacity: 23,800	Capacity: 16,200

== Official Draw ==
The draw for the FIFA U-17 World Cup was held on 7 July 2017 at the Hotel Sahara Star in Mumbai, India. The draw was attended by former U-17 World Cup champions Nwankwo Kanu (Nigeria) and former U-20 World Cup champions Esteban Cambiasso (Argentina), as well as India senior international Sunil Chhetri and badminton player P. V. Sindhu.

The 24 teams were drawn into six groups of four teams, with hosts India being allocated to position A1. The rest of the teams were allocated into their respective pots based on a ranking which was built according to past performances during the last five FIFA U-17 World Cups. Importance was given to the most recent U-17 World Cups.

Pot 1	Pot 2	Pot 3	Pot 4
India; Mexico; Brazil; Germany; Mali; France	Spain; Japan; New Zealand; England; Iran; United States	Costa Rica; North Korea; Honduras; Iraq; Turkey; Colombia	Chile; Paraguay; Ghana; Guinea; Niger; New Caledonia

== Referees ==
FIFA's Referees' Committee selected 21 referees, representing all six confederations, to officiate at the U-17 World Cup: Seven from UEFA, four from CONMEBOL, three each from the AFC, CAF, and CONCACAF, and one from the OFC. Interestingly, no referee from host country India were selected to officiate.

Confederation	Referee	Assistant referees	Support referee
AFC	(Singapore) Muhammad Taqi	(Singapore) Lee Tzu Liang (Singapore) Koh Min Kiat	(North Korea) Ri Hyang-ok
AFC	(Japan) Ryuji Sato	(Japan) Toru Sagara (Japan) Hiroshi Yamauchi	(North Korea) Ri Hyang-ok
AFC	(Bahrain) Nawaf Shukralla	(Bahrain) Yaser Tulefat (Bahrain) Ebrahim Saleh	(North Korea) Ri Hyang-ok
CAF	(Algeria) Mehdi Abid Charef	(Algeria) Albdelhak Etchiali (Tunisia) Anouar Hmila	(Zambia) Gladys Lengwe
CAF	(Madagascar) Hamada Nampiandraza	(Mozambique) Arsenio Marengula (Niger) Yahaya Mahamadou	(Zambia) Gladys Lengwe
CAF	(Ethiopia) Bamlak Tessema Weyesa	(Democratic Republic of the Congo) Olivier Safari (Uganda) Mark Ssonko	(Zambia) Gladys Lengwe
CONCACAF	(United States) Jair Marrufo	(United States) Frank Anderson (United States) Corey Rockwell	(Canada) Carol Chenard
CONCACAF	(Costa Rica) Ricardo Montero	(Costa Rica) Octavio Jara (Costa Rica) Juan Carlos Mora	(Canada) Carol Chenard
CONCACAF	(Panama) John Pitti	(Panama) Gabriel Victoria (Honduras) Christian Ramírez	(Canada) Carol Chenard
CONMEBOL	(Venezuela) José Argote	(Venezuela) Luis Murillo (Venezuela) Carlos López	(Uruguay) Claudia Umpierrez
CONMEBOL	(Paraguay) Enrique Cáceres	(Paraguay) Eduardo Cardozo (Paraguay) Juan Zorrilla	(Uruguay) Claudia Umpierrez
CONMEBOL	(Brazil) Sandro Ricci	(Brazil) Emerson de Carvalho (Brazil) Marcelo Van Gasse	(Uruguay) Claudia Umpierrez
CONMEBOL	(Bolivia) Gery Vargas	(Bolivia) Juan Pablo Montaño (Bolivia) Jose Alberto Antelo	(Uruguay) Claudia Umpierrez
OFC	(French Polynesia) Abdelkader Zitouni	(Tonga) Folio Moeaki (Solomon Islands) Bernard Mutukera	(New Zealand) Anna-Marie Keighley
UEFA	(Romania) Ovidiu Hațegan	(Romania) Octavian Șovre (Romania) Sebastian Gheorghe	(Ukraine) Kateryna Monzul (Switzerland) Esther Staubli
UEFA	(Scotland) Bobby Madden	(Scotland) David McGeachie (Scotland) Alastair Mather	(Ukraine) Kateryna Monzul (Switzerland) Esther Staubli
UEFA	(Greece) Anastasios Sidiropoulos	(Greece) Polychronis Kostaras (Greece) Lazaros Dimitriadis	(Ukraine) Kateryna Monzul (Switzerland) Esther Staubli
UEFA	(Portugal) Artur Soares Dias	(Portugal) Rui Tavares (Portugal) Paulo Soares	(Ukraine) Kateryna Monzul (Switzerland) Esther Staubli
UEFA	(England) Anthony Taylor	(England) Gary Beswick (England) Adam Nunn	(Ukraine) Kateryna Monzul (Switzerland) Esther Staubli
UEFA	(France) Clément Turpin	(France) Nicolas Danos (France) Cyril Gringore	(Ukraine) Kateryna Monzul (Switzerland) Esther Staubli
UEFA	(Slovenia) Slavko Vinčić	(Slovenia) Tomaz Klancnik (Slovenia) Andraz Kovacic	(Ukraine) Kateryna Monzul (Switzerland) Esther Staubli

== Squads ==
Each team's squad for the FIFA U-17 World Cup consisted of 21 players. Each participating national association had to confirm their final 21-player squad by 21 September 2017. A total of 504 players participated in the tournament. The squads were announced by FIFA on 26 September 2017.

== Group stage ==
The top two teams of each group and the four best third-placed teams advanced to the round of 16.

All times are local, IST (UTC+5:30).

=== Tiebreakers ===
The rankings of teams in each group are determined as follows (regulations Article 17.7):

1. points obtained in all group matches;
2. goal difference in all group matches;
3. number of goals scored in all group matches;

If two or more teams are equal on the basis of the above three criteria, their rankings are determined as follows:

4. points obtained in the group matches between the teams concerned;
5. goal difference in the group matches between the teams concerned;
6. number of goals scored in the group matches between the teams concerned;
7. fair play points:
  - first yellow card: minus 1 point;
  - indirect red card (second yellow card): minus 3 points;
  - direct red card: minus 4 points;
  - yellow card and direct red card: minus 5 points;
8. drawing of lots by the FIFA Organising Committee.

=== Group A ===
Pos	Team	Pld	W	D	L	GF	GA	GD	Pts	Qualification
1	Ghana	3	2	0	1	5	1	+4	6	Knockout stage
2	Colombia	3	2	0	1	5	3	+2	6 (Note: Head-to-head points: Colombia 3, United States 0.)	Knockout stage
3	United States	3	2	0	1	5	3	+2	6	Knockout stage
4	India (H)	3	0	0	3	1	9	−8	0	

Source: FIFA
Rules for classification: Group stage tiebreakers
(H) Hosts
Notes:
6 October 2017
17:00

Colombia	0–1	Ghana
	Report	S. Ibrahim 39'

Jawaharlal Nehru Stadium, New Delhi
Attendance: 24,300
Referee: Clément Turpin (France)
6 October 2017
20:00

India	0–3	United States
	Report	Sargent 30' (pen.); Durkin 51'; Carleton 84'

Jawaharlal Nehru Stadium, New Delhi
Attendance: 46,351
Referee: Gery Vargas (Bolivia)

9 October 2017
17:00

Ghana	0–1	United States
	Report	Akinola 75'

Jawaharlal Nehru Stadium, New Delhi
Attendance: 17,500
Referee: Anastasios Sidiropoulos (Greece)
9 October 2017
20:00

India	1–2	Colombia
Jeakson 82'	Report	Peñaloza 49', 83'

Jawaharlal Nehru Stadium, New Delhi
Attendance: 48,184
Referee: Ricardo Montero (Costa Rica)

12 October 2017
20:00

Ghana	4–0	India
Ayiah 43', 52'; Danso 86'; Toku 87'	Report

Jawaharlal Nehru Stadium, New Delhi
Attendance: 52,614
Referee: Abdelkader Zitouni (Tahiti)
12 October 2017
20:00

United States	1–3	Colombia
Acosta 24'	Report	Vidal 3'; Peñaloza 67'; D. Caicedo 87'

Dr. DY Patil Stadium, Navi Mumbai
Attendance: 22,263
Referee: Artur Soares Dias (Portugal)

=== Group B ===
Pos	Team	Pld	W	D	L	GF	GA	GD	Pts	Qualification
1	Paraguay	3	3	0	0	10	5	+5	9	Knockout stage
2	Mali	3	2	0	1	8	4	+4	6	Knockout stage
3	New Zealand	3	0	1	2	4	8	−4	1	
4	Turkey	3	0	1	2	2	7	−5	1	

Source: FIFA
Rules for classification: Group stage tiebreakers
6 October 2017
17:00

New Zealand	1–1	Turkey
Mata 58'	Report	Kutucu 18'

Dr. DY Patil Stadium, Navi Mumbai
Attendance: 9,727
Referee: John Pitti (Panama)
6 October 2017
20:00

Paraguay	3–2	Mali
Galeano 12'; Sánchez 17'; Rodríguez 55' (pen.)	Report	Dramé 20'; N'Diaye 34'

Dr. DY Patil Stadium, Navi Mumbai
Attendance: 25,342
Referee: Artur Soares Dias (Portugal)

9 October 2017
17:00

Turkey	0–3	Mali
	Report	D. Traoré 38'; N'Diaye 68'; Konaté 86'

Dr. DY Patil Stadium, Navi Mumbai
Attendance: 18,323
Referee: Muhammad Taqi (Singapore)
9 October 2017
20:00

Paraguay	4–2	New Zealand
Rodríguez 2'; Vega 75', 78'; Armoa 90+1'	Report	Duarte 20', 34' (o.g.)

Dr. DY Patil Stadium, Navi Mumbai
Attendance: 20,877
Referee: Bamlak Tessema Weyesa (Ethiopia)

12 October 2017
17:00

Turkey	1–3	Paraguay
Kesgin 90+3'	Report	Bogado 41'; Cardozo 43'; Galeano 61'

Dr. DY Patil Stadium, Navi Mumbai
Attendance: 8,895
Referee: Ryuji Sato (Japan)
12 October 2017
17:00

Mali	3–1	New Zealand
Jiddou 18'; D. Traoré 50'; N'Diaye 82'	Report	Spragg 72'

Jawaharlal Nehru Stadium, New Delhi
Attendance: 23,112
Referee: Anastasios Sidiropoulos (Greece)

=== Group C ===
Pos	Team	Pld	W	D	L	GF	GA	GD	Pts	Qualification
1	Iran	3	3	0	0	10	1	+9	9	Knockout stage
2	Germany	3	2	0	1	5	6	−1	6	Knockout stage
3	Guinea	3	0	1	2	4	8	−4	1	
4	Costa Rica	3	0	1	2	3	7	−4	1	

Source: FIFA
Rules for classification: Group stage tiebreakers
7 October 2017
17:00

Germany	2–1	Costa Rica
Arp 21'; Awuku 89'	Report	Gómez 64'

Pandit Jawaharlal Nehru Stadium, Margao
Attendance: 12,329
Referee: Mehdi Abid Charef (Algeria)
7 October 2017
20:00

Iran	3–1	Guinea
Sayyadmanesh 59'; Sharifi 70' (pen.); Karimi 90'	Report	Touré 90+1'

Pandit Jawaharlal Nehru Stadium, Margao
Attendance: 12,329
Referee: José Argote (Venezuela)

10 October 2017
17:00

Costa Rica	2–2	Guinea
Jarquin 26'; Gómez 67'	Report	Touré 30'; I. Soumah 81'

Pandit Jawaharlal Nehru Stadium, Margao
Attendance: 6,717
Referee: Bobby Madden (Scotland)
10 October 2017
20:00

Iran	4–0	Germany
Delfi 6', 42'; Sayyadmanesh 49'; Namdari 75'	Report

Pandit Jawaharlal Nehru Stadium, Margao
Attendance: 8,267
Referee: Jair Marrufo (United States)

13 October 2017
17:00

Costa Rica	0–3	Iran
	Report	Ghobeishavi 25' (pen.); Shariati 29' (pen.); Sardari 89'

Pandit Jawaharlal Nehru Stadium, Margao
Attendance: 8,549
Referee: Hamada Nampiandraza (Madagascar)
13 October 2017
17:00

Guinea	1–3	Germany
I. Soumah 26'	Report	Arp 8'; Kühn 62'; Cetin 90+2' (pen.)

Jawaharlal Nehru International Stadium, Kochi
Attendance: 9,250
Referee: John Pitti (Panama)

=== Group D ===
Pos	Team	Pld	W	D	L	GF	GA	GD	Pts	Qualification
1	Brazil	3	3	0	0	6	1	+5	9	Knockout stage
2	Spain	3	2	0	1	7	2	+5	6	Knockout stage
3	Niger	3	1	0	2	1	6	−5	3	Knockout stage
4	North Korea	3	0	0	3	0	5	−5	0	

Source: FIFA
Rules for classification: Group stage tiebreakers
7 October 2017
17:00

Brazil	2–1	Spain
Lincoln 25'; Paulinho 45+1'	Report	Wesley 5' (o.g.)

Jawaharlal Nehru International Stadium, Kochi
Attendance: 21,362
Referee: Nawaf Shukralla (Bahrain)
7 October 2017
20:00

North Korea	0–1	Niger
	Report	Abdourahmane 59'

Jawaharlal Nehru International Stadium, Kochi
Attendance: 2,754
Referee: Abdelkader Zitouni (Tahiti)

10 October 2017
17:00

Spain	4–0	Niger
A. Ruiz 21', 41'; César 45+1'; Gómez 82'	Report

Jawaharlal Nehru International Stadium, Kochi
Attendance: 7,926
Referee: Enrique Cáceres (Paraguay)
10 October 2017
20:00

North Korea	0–2	Brazil
	Report	Lincoln 56'; Paulinho 61'

Jawaharlal Nehru International Stadium, Kochi
Attendance: 15,314
Referee: Slavko Vinčić (Slovenia)

13 October 2017
20:00

Spain	2–0	North Korea
Moha 4'; César 71'	Report

Jawaharlal Nehru International Stadium, Kochi
Attendance: 14,544
Referee: José Argote (Venezuela)
13 October 2017
20:00

Niger	0–2	Brazil
	Report	Lincoln 4'; Brenner 34'

Pandit Jawaharlal Nehru Stadium, Margao
Attendance: 15,830
Referee: Bobby Madden (Scotland)

=== Group E ===
Pos	Team	Pld	W	D	L	GF	GA	GD	Pts	Qualification
1	France	3	3	0	0	14	3	+11	9	Knockout stage
2	Japan	3	1	1	1	8	4	+4	4	Knockout stage
3	Honduras	3	1	0	2	7	11	−4	3	Knockout stage
4	New Caledonia	3	0	1	2	2	13	−11	1	

Source: FIFA
Rules for classification: Group stage tiebreakers
8 October 2017
17:00

New Caledonia	1–7	France
Wadenges 90'	Report	Iwa 5' (o.g.); Gouiri 19', 33'; Gomes 30'; Caqueret 40'; Wanesse 43' (o.g.); Isidor 90+1'

Indira Gandhi Athletic Stadium, Guwahati
Attendance: 12,640
Referee: Hamada Nampiandraza (Madagascar)
8 October 2017
20:00

Honduras	1–6	Japan
Palacios 36'	Report	Nakamura 22', 30', 43'; Kubo 45'; Miyashiro 51'; Suzuki 90'

Indira Gandhi Athletic Stadium, Guwahati
Attendance: 13,285
Referee: Anthony Taylor (England)

11 October 2017
17:00

France	2–1	Japan
Gouiri 13', 71'	Report	Miyashiro 73' (pen.)

Indira Gandhi Athletic Stadium, Guwahati
Attendance: 9,575
Referee: Gery Vargas (Bolivia)
11 October 2017
20:00

Honduras	5–0	New Caledonia
Mejía 25', 42'; Canales 27'; Palacios 51', 88'	Report

Indira Gandhi Athletic Stadium, Guwahati
Attendance: 11,002
Referee: Mehdi Abid Charef (Algeria)

14 October 2017
17:00

France	5–1	Honduras
Isidor 14'; Flips 23', 64'; Gouiri 86'; Adli 90+6'	Report	Mejía 10'

Indira Gandhi Athletic Stadium, Guwahati
Attendance: 12,831
Referee: Muhammad Taqi (Singapore)
14 October 2017
17:00

Japan	1–1	New Caledonia
Nakamura 7'	Report	Jeno 83'

Vivekananda Yuba Bharati Krirangan, Kolkata
Attendance: 44,665
Referee: Esther Staubli (Switzerland)

=== Group F ===
Pos	Team	Pld	W	D	L	GF	GA	GD	Pts	Qualification
1	England	3	3	0	0	11	2	+9	9	Knockout stage
2	Iraq	3	1	1	1	4	5	−1	4	Knockout stage
3	Mexico	3	0	2	1	3	4	−1	2	Knockout stage
4	Chile	3	0	1	2	0	7	−7	1	

Source: FIFA
Rules for classification: Group stage tiebreakers
8 October 2017
17:00

Chile	0–4	England
	Report	Hudson-Odoi 5'; Sancho 51', 60'; Gomes 81'

Vivekananda Yuba Bharati Krirangan, Kolkata
Attendance: 46,154
Referee: Ryuji Sato (Japan)
8 October 2017
20:00

Iraq	1–1	Mexico
Dawood 16'	Report	De la Rosa 51'

Vivekananda Yuba Bharati Krirangan, Kolkata
Attendance: 55,800
Referee: Ovidiu Hațegan (Romania)

11 October 2017
17:00

England	3–2	Mexico
Brewster 39'; Foden 48'; Sancho 55' (pen.)	Report	Lainez 65', 72'

Vivekananda Yuba Bharati Krirangan, Kolkata
Attendance: 48,620
Referee: Nawaf Shukralla (Bahrain)
11 October 2017
20:00

Iraq	3–0	Chile
Dawood 6', 68'; D. Valencia 81' (o.g.)	Report

Vivekananda Yuba Bharati Krirangan, Kolkata
Attendance: 50,286
Referee: Clément Turpin (France)

14 October 2017
20:00

England	4–0	Iraq
Gomes 11'; Smith Rowe 57'; Loader 59', 71'	Report

Vivekananda Yuba Bharati Krirangan, Kolkata
Attendance: 56,372
Referee: Jair Marrufo (United States)
14 October 2017
20:00

Mexico	0–0	Chile
	Report

Indira Gandhi Athletic Stadium, Guwahati
Attendance: 15,794
Referee: Slavko Vinčić (Slovenia)

=== Ranking of third-placed teams ===
The four best teams among those ranked third are determined as follows (regulations Article 17.7):

1. points obtained in all group matches;
2. goal difference in all group matches;
3. number of goals scored in all group matches;
4. fair play points;
5. drawing of lots by the FIFA Organising Committee.

Pos	Grp	Team	Pld	W	D	L	GF	GA	GD	Pts	Qualification
1	A	United States	3	2	0	1	5	3	+2	6	Knockout stage
2	E	Honduras	3	1	0	2	7	11	−4	3	Knockout stage
3	D	Niger	3	1	0	2	1	6	−5	3	Knockout stage
4	F	Mexico	3	0	2	1	3	4	−1	2	Knockout stage
5	B	New Zealand	3	0	1	2	4	8	−4	1 (Note: Fair play points: New Zealand −6, Guinea −9.)	
6	C	Guinea	3	0	1	2	4	8	−4	1	

Source: FIFA
Rules for classification: 1) Points; 2) Goal difference; 3) Goals scored; 4) Fair play points; 5) Drawing of lots.

== Knockout stage ==
In the knockout stages, if a match is level at the end of normal playing time, the match is determined by a penalty shoot-out (no extra time is played).

In the round of 16, the four third-placed teams were matched with the winners of groups A, B, C, and D. The specific match-ups involving the third-placed teams depend on which four third-placed teams qualified for the round of 16:

Third-placed teams qualify from groups						1A vs	1B vs	1C vs	1D vs
A	B	C	D			3C	3D	3A	3B
A	B	C		E		3C	3A	3B	3E
A	B	C			F	3C	3A	3B	3F
A	B		D	E		3D	3A	3B	3E
A	B		D		F	3D	3A	3B	3F
A	B			E	F	3E	3A	3B	3F
A		C	D	E		3C	3D	3A	3E
A		C	D		F	3C	3D	3A	3F
A		C		E	F	3C	3A	3F	3E
A			D	E	F	3D	3A	3F	3E
	B	C	D	E		3C	3D	3B	3E
	B	C	D		F	3C	3D	3B	3F
	B	C		E	F	3E	3C	3B	3F
	B		D	E	F	3E	3D	3B	3F
		C	D	E	F	3C	3D	3F	3E

=== Bracket ===
Round of 16
16 October – New Delhi
Colombia	0
Germany	4
18 October – Kochi
Brazil	3
Honduras	0
16 October – New Delhi
Paraguay	0
United States	5
17 October – Kolkata
England (p)	0 (5)
Japan	0 (3)
17 October – Margao
Mali	5
Iraq	1
18 October – Navi Mumbai
Ghana	2
Niger	0
17 October – Guwahati
France	1
Spain	2
17 October – Margao
Iran	2
Mexico	1

Quarter-finals
22 October – Kolkata
Germany	1
Brazil	2
21 October – Margao
United States	1
England	4
21 October – Guwahati
Mali	2
Ghana	1
22 October – Kochi
Spain	3
Iran	1

Semi-finals
25 October – Kolkata
Brazil	1
England	3
25 October – Navi Mumbai
Mali	1
Spain	3

Final
28 October – Kolkata
England	5
Spain	2
Third place play-off
28 October – Kolkata
Brazil	2
Mali	0

=== Round of 16 ===
16 October 2017
17:00

Colombia	0–4	Germany
	Report	Arp 7', 65'; Bisseck 39'; Yeboah 49'

Jawaharlal Nehru Stadium, New Delhi
Attendance: 19,477
Referee: Nawaf Shukralla (Bahrain)

16 October 2017
20:00

Paraguay	0–5	United States
	Report	Weah 19', 53', 77'; Carleton 63'; Sargent 74'

Jawaharlal Nehru Stadium, New Delhi
Attendance: 34,895
Referee: Ovidiu Hațegan (Romania)

17 October 2017
17:00

Iran	2–1	Mexico
Sharifi 7' (pen.); Sayyadmanesh 11'	Report	De la Rosa 37'

Pandit Jawaharlal Nehru Stadium, Margao
Attendance: 5,529
Referee: Anthony Taylor (England)

17 October 2017
17:00

France	1–2	Spain
Pintor 34'	Report	Miranda 44'; A. Ruiz 90' (pen.)

Indira Gandhi Athletic Stadium, Guwahati
Attendance: 13,316
Referee: Enrique Cáceres (Paraguay)

17 October 2017
20:00

England	0–0	Japan
	Report
Penalties
Brewster (penalty scored); Hudson-Odoi (penalty scored); Foden (penalty scored); Anderson (penalty scored); Kirby (penalty scored)	5–3	(penalty scored) Sugawara; (penalty scored) Miyashiro; (penalty missed) Kida; (penalty scored) Kozuki

Vivekananda Yuba Bharati Krirangan, Kolkata
Attendance: 53,302
Referee: José Argote (Venezuela)

17 October 2017
20:00

Mali	5–1	Iraq
Dramé 25'; N'Diaye 33', 90+4'; Konaté 73'; S. Camara 87'	Report	Kareem 85'

Pandit Jawaharlal Nehru Stadium, Margao
Attendance: 9,240
Referee: Ricardo Montero (Costa Rica)

18 October 2017
17:00

Ghana	2–0	Niger
Ayiah 45+4' (pen.); Danso 90'	Report

Dr. DY Patil Stadium, Navi Mumbai
Attendance: 21,286
Referee: Artur Soares Dias (Portugal)

18 October 2017
20:00

Brazil	3–0	Honduras
Brenner 11', 56'; Marcos Antônio 44'	Report

Jawaharlal Nehru International Stadium, Kochi
Attendance: 20,668
Referee: Bamlak Tessema Weyesa (Ethiopia)

=== Quarter-finals ===
21 October 2017
17:00

Mali	2–1	Ghana
Dramé 15'; D. Traoré 61'	Report	K. Mohammed 70' (pen.)

Indira Gandhi Athletic Stadium, Guwahati
Attendance: 3,706
Referee: Mehdi Abid Charef (Algeria)

21 October 2017
20:00

United States	1–4	England
Sargent 72'	Report	Brewster 11', 14', 90+6' (pen.); Gibbs-White 64'

Pandit Jawaharlal Nehru Stadium, Margao
Attendance: 16,148
Referee: Clément Turpin (France)

22 October 2017
17:00

Spain	3–1	Iran
A. Ruiz 13'; Gómez 60'; Torres 67'	Report	Karimi 69'

Jawaharlal Nehru International Stadium, Kochi
Attendance: 28,436
Referee: Gery Vargas (Bolivia)

22 October 2017
20:00

Germany	1–2	Brazil
Arp 21' (pen.)	Report	Weverson 71'; Paulinho 77'

Vivekananda Yuba Bharati Krirangan, Kolkata
Attendance: 66,613
Referee: Jair Marrufo (United States)

=== Semi-finals ===
25 October 2017
17:00

Brazil	1–3	England
Wesley 21'	Report	Brewster 10', 39', 77'

Vivekananda Yuba Bharati Krirangan, Kolkata (Note: The venue of the first semi-final was moved to Vivekananda Yuba Bharati Krirangan, Kolkata, following assessment of the pitch conditions of the original venue, Indira Gandhi Athletic Stadium, Guwahati, which had been affected by severe rainfall.)
Attendance: 63,881
Referee: Ovidiu Hațegan (Romania)

25 October 2017
20:00

Mali	1–3	Spain
N'Diaye 74'	Report	A. Ruiz 19' (pen.), 43'; Torres 71'

Dr. DY Patil Stadium, Navi Mumbai
Attendance: 37,847
Referee: Ryuji Sato (Japan)

=== Third place play-off ===
28 October 2017
17:00

Brazil	2–0	Mali
Alan 55'; Yuri Alberto 88'	Report

Vivekananda Yuba Bharati Krirangan, Kolkata
Attendance: 56,422
Referee: Ricardo Montero (Costa Rica)

=== Final ===
28 October 2017
20:00

England	5–2	Spain
Brewster 44'; Gibbs-White 58'; Foden 69', 88'; Guéhi 84'	Report	S. Gómez 10', 31'

Vivekananda Yuba Bharati Krirangan, Kolkata
Attendance: 66,684
Referee: Enrique Cáceres (Paraguay)

== Awards ==
The following awards were given at the conclusion of the tournament. They were all sponsored by Adidas, except for the FIFA Fair Play Award.

Golden Ball	Silver Ball	Bronze Ball
(England) Phil Foden	(Spain) Sergio Gómez	(England) Rhian Brewster
Golden Boot	Silver Boot	Bronze Boot
(England) Rhian Brewster (8 goals, 1 assist, 540 minutes played)	(Mali) Lassana N'Diaye (6 goals, 0 assists, 603 minutes played)	(Spain) Abel Ruiz (6 goals, 0 assists, 618 minutes played)
Golden Glove
(Brazil) Gabriel Brazão
FIFA Fair Play Award
Brazil

== Final ranking ==
As per statistical convention in football, matches decided in extra time are counted as wins and losses, while matches decided by penalty shoot-outs are counted as draws.

Pos	Team	Pld	W	D	L	GF	GA	GD	Pts	Final result
1	England	7	6	1	0	23	6	+17	19	Champions
2	Spain	7	5	0	2	17	10	+7	15	Runners-up
3	Brazil	7	6	0	1	14	5	+9	18	Third place
4	Mali	7	4	0	3	16	11	+5	12	Fourth place
5	Iran	5	4	0	1	13	5	+8	12	Eliminated in Quarter-finals
6	Ghana	5	3	0	2	8	3	+5	9	Eliminated in Quarter-finals
7	United States	5	3	0	2	11	7	+4	9	Eliminated in Quarter-finals
8	Germany	5	3	0	2	9	7	+2	9	Eliminated in Quarter-finals
9	France	4	3	0	1	15	5	+10	9	Eliminated in Round of 16
10	Paraguay	4	3	0	1	10	10	0	9	Eliminated in Round of 16
11	Colombia	4	2	0	2	5	7	−2	6	Eliminated in Round of 16
12	Japan	4	1	2	1	8	4	+4	5	Eliminated in Round of 16
13	Iraq	4	1	1	2	5	10	−5	4	Eliminated in Round of 16
14	Honduras	4	1	0	3	7	14	−7	3	Eliminated in Round of 16
15	Niger	4	1	0	3	1	8	−7	3	Eliminated in Round of 16
16	Mexico	4	0	2	2	4	6	−2	2	Eliminated in Round of 16
17	New Zealand	3	0	1	2	4	8	−4	1	Eliminated in Group stage
18	Guinea	3	0	1	2	4	8	−4	1	Eliminated in Group stage
19	Costa Rica	3	0	1	2	3	7	−4	1	Eliminated in Group stage
20	Turkey	3	0	1	2	2	7	−5	1	Eliminated in Group stage
21	Chile	3	0	1	2	0	7	−7	1	Eliminated in Group stage
22	New Caledonia	3	0	1	2	2	13	−11	1	Eliminated in Group stage
23	North Korea	3	0	0	3	0	5	−5	0	Eliminated in Group stage
24	India	3	0	0	3	1	9	−8	0	Eliminated in Group stage

Source: FIFA

== Goalscorers ==
8 goals

- (England) Rhian Brewster

6 goals

- (Mali) Lassana N'Diaye
- (Spain) Abel Ruiz

5 goals

- (France) Amine Gouiri
- (Germany) Jann-Fiete Arp

4 goals

- (Japan) Keito Nakamura
- (Spain) Sergio Gómez Martín

3 goals

- (Brazil) Brenner
- (Brazil) Lincoln
- (Brazil) Paulinho
- (Colombia) Juan Peñaloza
- (England) Phil Foden
- (England) Jadon Sancho
- (Ghana) Eric Ayiah
- (Honduras) Carlos Mejía
- (Honduras) Patrick Palacios
- (Iran) Allahyar Sayyadmanesh
- (Iraq) Mohammed Dawood Yaseen
- (Mali) Hadji Dramé
- (Mali) Djemoussa Traoré
- (United States) Josh Sargent
- (United States) Timothy Weah

2 goals

- (Costa Rica) Andrés Gómez
- (England) Morgan Gibbs-White
- (England) Angel Gomes
- (England) Danny Loader
- (France) Alexis Flips
- (France) Wilson Isidor
- (Ghana) Richard Danso
- (Guinea) Ibrahima Soumah
- (Guinea) Fandje Touré
- (Iran) Younes Delfi
- (Iran) Saeid Karimi
- (Iran) Mohammad Sharifi
- (Japan) Taisei Miyashiro
- (Mali) Fode Konaté
- (Mexico) Diego Lainez
- (Mexico) Roberto de la Rosa
- (Paraguay) Antonio Galeano
- (Paraguay) Alan Francisco Rodríguez
- (Paraguay) Aníbal Vega
- (Spain) César Gelabert
- (Spain) Ferran Torres
- (United States) Andrew Carleton

1 goal

- (Brazil) Alan Souza
- (Brazil) Yuri Alberto
- (Brazil) Marcos Antônio
- (Brazil) Wesley
- (Brazil) Weverson
- (Colombia) Déiber Caicedo
- (Colombia) Juan Vidal
- (Costa Rica) Yecxy Jarquin
- (England) Callum Hudson-Odoi
- (England) Emile Smith Rowe
- (England) Marc Guéhi
- (France) Yacine Adli
- (France) Claudio Gomes
- (France) Maxence Caqueret
- (France) Lenny Pintor
- (Germany) Noah Awuku
- (Germany) Yann Aurel Bisseck
- (Germany) Sahverdi Cetin
- (Germany) Nicolas Kühn
- (Germany) John Yeboah
- (Ghana) Ibrahim Sadiq
- (Ghana) Mohammed Kudus
- (Ghana) Emmanuel Toku
- (Honduras) Joshua Canales
- (India) Jeakson Singh Thounaojam
- (Iran) Mohammad Ghobeishavi
- (Iran) Vahid Namdari
- (Iran) Mohammad Sardari
- (Iran) Taha Shariati
- (Iraq) Ali Kareem
- (Japan) Takefusa Kubo
- (Japan) Tochi Suzuki
- (Mali) Seme Camara
- (Mali) Salam Giddou
- (New Caledonia) Cameron Wadenges
- (New Caledonia) Jekob Jeno
- (New Zealand) Max Mata
- (New Zealand) Charles Spragg
- (Niger) Salim Abdourahmane
- (Paraguay) Blas Armoa
- (Paraguay) Giovanni Bogado
- (Paraguay) Fernando David Cardozo
- (Paraguay) Leonardo Sánchez Cohener
- (Spain) Juan Miranda
- (Spain) Mohamed Moukhliss
- (Turkey) Kerem Atakan Kesgin
- (Turkey) Ahmed Kutucu
- (United States) George Acosta
- (United States) Ayo Akinola
- (United States) Chris Durkin

1 own goal

- (Brazil) Wesley (against Spain)
- (Chile) Diego Valencia (against Iraq)
- (New Caledonia) Bernard Iwa (against France)
- (New Caledonia) Kiam Wanesse (against France)

2 own goals

- (Paraguay) Alexis Duarte (against New Zealand)

Source: FIFA

== Marketing ==
=== Sponsorships ===
FIFA partners	National Supporters
Adidas; Coca-Cola; Gazprom; Hyundai; Qatar Airways; Visa; Wanda Group	Bank of Baroda; Byju's; Coal India; Dalmia Cement; Hero MotoCorp; NTPC Limited

== Broadcasting ==
FIFA released the media licensing rights for the U-17 World Cup on 21 September 2017. In India, the official broadcaster was Sony TEN and Sony ESPN. In the United States, the tournament was broadcast on Fox Sports 2 while the United Kingdom had the tournament broadcast on Eurosport.

== Legacy ==
The 2017 FIFA U-17 World Cup was regarded as a success by the media, FIFA and the tournament organisers. Jaime Yarza, Head of FIFA Tournaments, said, "It's been a fantastic tournament with an overwhelming response of everybody involved. First and foremost, the fans have filled the stadiums in all the matches, showing fair play and respect, cheering on all the teams, and really loving the football they have seen. The figures speak for themselves: more than 1.2 million fans attended games at the stadiums. By the final matchday, we're probably going to break the [attendance] record of all the other U-17 World Cups and we might even break the record for the U-20 World Cup, which is an amazing achievement. It really shows that India is a footballing nation in every sense. The hard work put in place during so many years has received a great response from everybody. It has been a very proud moment for all of us."

The tournament was the most attended and highest scoring edition of the FIFA U-17 World Cup in history. It was also the highest attended men's age-group World Cup ever, surpassing the attendance record of the FIFA U-20 World Cup. The attendance for this World Cup was a record 1,347,133 surpassing China's 1985 edition where it was 1,230,976, and the 2011 U-20 World Cup in Colombia which was attended by 1,309,929 people.

The 177 goals scored during the tournament made it the highest scoring U-17 World Cup in history, surpassing the previous record of 172 during the 2013 edition in the United Arab Emirates. The 2017 FIFA U-17 World Cup also recorded the highest goal average of 3.40 per match since the tournament format was expanded from 16 teams to 24 teams in 2007.

In September 2017, India submitted a bid to host the 2019 FIFA U-20 World Cup, but lost to Poland. India was selected to host the 2020 FIFA U-17 Women's World Cup by the FIFA Council on 15 March 2019.

== Brand design and event execution ==
The official tournament emblem was managed under the direction of FIFA Creative Services, adapting the global "trophy-silhouette" visual framework previously introduced for FIFA's premier tournaments. The design integrated localized Indian cultural motifs, including the branches of a Banyan tree, a kite, and a starburst interpretation of the Ashoka Chakra.

The live experiential and broadcast brand execution for the tournament's major milestone events, including the Official Draw, was produced by experiential agency Wizcraft International Entertainment. Senior brand architect, Creative Director and Production designer, Christopher Whyte led the translation of FIFA’s global corporate guidelines into the live broadcast environment, managing the spatial and stage production design for the Official Draw held on 7 July 2017 at the Hotel Sahara Star in Mumbai, India. Localized environmental stadium branding, regional venue dressing, and local signage across the host cities were executed by creative agency Myndroot.

== See also ==
- Mission XI Million
