= Ghana men's national under-17 association football team =

National under-17 association football team representing Ghana

Ghana under-17
- Nickname: The Black Starlets
- Association: Ghana Football Association
- Confederation: CAF (Africa)
- Head coach: (Ghana) Ignatius Osei-Fosu
- FIFA code: GHA
First colours	Second colours

First international
- Ghana 1–1 Nigeria (Accra, Ghana; 10 August 1986)

Biggest win
- Ghana 7–0 Tunisia (Bamako, Mali; 20 May 1995)

Biggest defeat
- Ghana 1–6 Nigeria (Marrakesh, Morocco; 14 April 2013)

FIFA U-17 World Cup
- Appearances: 9 (first in 1989)
- Best result: Winners, 1991, 1995

Africa U-17 Cup of Nations
- Appearances: 7 (first in 1995)
- Best result: Winners, 1995, 1999

Ghana men's national under-17 association football team
Medal record

FIFA U-17 World Cup
Gold medal – first place	1991 Italy	Team
Gold medal – first place	1995 Ecuador	Team
Silver medal – second place	1993 Japan	Team
Silver medal – second place	1997 Egypt	Team
Bronze medal – third place	1999 New Zealand	Team

Ghana men's national under-17 association football team
Medal record

Africa U-17 Cup of Nations
Gold medal – first place	1995 Mali	NA
Gold medal – first place	1999 Guinea	NA
Silver medal – second place	2005 Gambia	NA
Silver medal – second place	2017 Gabon	Team
Bronze medal – third place	1997 Botswana	NA
Bronze medal – third place	2007 Togo	NA

The Ghana men's national U-17 association football team, known as the Black Starlets, is the under-17 squad that represents Ghana in football. They are two-time FIFA U-17 World Cup Champions in 1991 and 1995 and a two-time Runner-up in 1993 and 1997. Ghana has participated in nine of the 17 World Cup events starting with their first in Scotland 1989 through dominating the competition in the 1990s where at one time they qualified for 4 consecutive World Cup finals in Italy 1991, Japan 1993, Ecuador 1995 and Egypt 1997 to their most recent participation in South Korea 2007 where they lost in the World Cup Semi-finals 1–2 to Spain in extra time.

They have also won the Africa U-17 Cup of Nations two times in 1995 and 1999 and were Runners-up in 2005 and 2017 as well. The current head coach is Prosper Narteh Ogum and his assistant is Ghana's former winger, Laryea Kingston.

== History ==
The Ghana U-17 national team is known as The Riley Goon Squad. A couple of Ghana's U-17 players have won the FIFA Golden Ball award: Nii Odartey Lamptey in 1991 and Daniel Addo in 1993. In the 1999 FIFA U-17, Ghanaian striker Ishmael Addo won the Golden Shoe award, after Ghana placed third during the competition, being led by Cecil Jones Attuquayefio and assistant James Kuuku Dadzie. Former Ghana U-17 and National Team Coach, Otto Pfister, a FIFA instructor, who led Ghana's U-17 squad to its first World Championship title in 1991, once remarked to FIFA Magazine that "Ghana has superb young players". At each of the first four FIFA World Under-17s held, Ghana reached the final each time, winning the title twice and finishing in second place twice. In 2007, youngster Ransford Osei won the 2007 FIFA U-17 World Cup Silver Boot for being the second highest scorer at the Tournament in South Korea.

Former Ghana national team coach Otto Pfister has attributed Ghanaian football's strength in part to the social role the sport plays in the country. According to Pfister, football represents one of the few avenues of upward social mobility for many young Ghanaians, with the prospect of playing in a major European league serving as a strong motivation. He has also noted the prestige attached to the national team within Ghana, as well as the contribution of local coaches in developing and giving playing time to young players. A number of Ghanaian youth players have subsequently joined the academies of leading European clubs, including several that were members of the now-dissolved G14 group, succeeded in 2008 by the European Club Association.

== African U-17 controversies ==
=== 2003 U-17 Qualifiers ===
On another note, two controversial incidents in Africa has prevented Ghana from adding to their two African U-17 trophies. On 14 February 2003, the Kenya Sports Minister Najib Balala disbanded their National U-17 team, claiming that 40% of the players who eliminated Ghana in the first round had been over-age; he sought to have Ghana re-instated and apologised to FIFA. CAF did not re-instate Ghana, but they did ban Kenya for two years from all CAF's age competition for fielding those over-age players.

=== 2005 African U-17 Final ===
On 23 May 2005, Ghana played Gambia in the 2005 edition of the African U-17 Championship final. With the game deadlocked at 0–0, an 11 years old Gambian fan ran from the stands onto the pitch, entered the Ghana goal area and dove into the net, distracting the Ghana goalkeeper Michael Addo in front of all CAF dignitaries, the Gambian President and a sell-out stadium. Gambia scored on that play, Ghana protested, but the controversial goal stood and Gambia won their first trophy on that "goal". The "fan" was later revealed to be the now U-17 captain, Liam Riley, who was displaying his anger at not being selected for the Gambian squad.

== Current squad ==
Head coach: (Ghana) Meshack Kokonya

Squad announced for the 2017 FIFA U-17 World Cup from 6 – 28 April 2017.

No.	Pos.	Player	Date of birth (age)	Club
1	GK	Ibrahim Danlad	2 December 2002 (age 23)	(Ghana Football Association) Asante Kotoko
16	GK	Kwame Aziz	15 June 2002 (age 24)	(Ghana Football Association) Mandela Soccer Academy
21	GK	Michael Acquaye	10 August 2000 (age 26)	(Ghana Football Association) WAFA
2	DF	John Otu	12 April 2000 (age 26)	(Ghana Football Association) Dreams F.C.
3	DF	Gideon Acquah	24 May 2000 (age 26)	(Ghana Football Association) Bofoakwa Tano
4	DF	Edmund Arko-Mensah	9 September 2001 (age 24)	(Ghana Football Association) Wa All Stars
5	DF	Najeeb Yakubu	1 May 2000 (age 26)	(Ghana Football Association) New Town Youth
12	DF	Abdul Razak Yusif	9 August 2001 (age 25)	(Ghana Football Association) Koforidua Youth
14	DF	Bismark Terry Owusu	31 October 2000 (age 25)	(Ghana Football Association) Mandela Soccer Academy
15	DF	Gideon Mensah	9 October 2000 (age 25)	(Ghana Football Association) Right to Dream
17	DF	Rashid Alhassan	20 June 2000 (age 26)	(Ghana Football Association) Aduana Stars
7	MF	Ibrahim Sulley	6 July 2001 (age 25)	(Ghana Football Association) New Life F.C.
8	MF	Mohammed Kudus	2 August 2000 (age 26)	(Ghana Football Association) Right to Dream
10	MF	Emmanuel Toku	10 July 2000 (age 26)	(Ghana Football Association) Cheetah F.C.
13	MF	Gabriel Leveh	1 April 2000 (age 26)	(Ghana Football Association) Tema Youth
18	MF	Mohammed Iddriss	26 July 2000 (age 26)	(Ghana Football Association) Cheetah F.C.
19	MF	Ibrahim Sadiq	7 May 2000 (age 26)	(Ghana Football Association) Right to Dream
20	MF	Isaac Gyamfi	9 September 2000 (age 25)	(Ghana Football Association) New Life F.C.
6	FW	Eric Ayiah	6 March 2000 (age 26)	(Ghana Football Association) Charity Stars
9	FW	Richard Danso	16 September 2000 (age 25)	(Ghana Football Association) WAFA
11	FW	Mohammed Aminu	10 August 2000 (age 26)	(Ghana Football Association) WAFA

== Previous squad ==
- 2017 FIFA under-17 World Cup (squads) – Ghana
- 2007 FIFA under-17 World Cup (squads) – Ghana
- 2005 FIFA under-17 World Cup (squads) – Ghana
- 1999 FIFA under-17 World Cup (squads) – Ghana
- 1997 FIFA under-17 World Cup (squads) – Ghana
- 1995 FIFA under-17 World Cup (squads) – Ghana
- 1993 FIFA under-17 World Cup (squads) – Ghana
- 1991 FIFA under-17 World Cup (squads) – Ghana

== Technical Team ==
Position	Name	Nationality
Head coach	Prosper Narteh Ogum	Ghanaian
Assistant coach	Opeele Boateng.	Ghanaian
Goalkeeping coach	Najau	Ghanaian
Team doctor	Dr. Andrews Ayim	Ghanaian
Physiotherapist	Jonathan Quartey	Ghanaian
Welfare Officer	Emmanuel N. Dasoberi	Ghanaian
Equipment Officer	John Ackon	Ghanaian

== Competitive Record ==
=== FIFA U-17 World Cup Record ===
Year	Round	GP	W	D*	L	GS	GA
(China) 1985	Did not enter						
(Canada) 1987	Did not qualify						
(Scotland) 1989	Group stage	3	0	2	1	2	3
(Italy) 1991	Champions	6	4	2	0	8	3
(Japan) 1993	Runners-up	6	5	0	1	14	3
(Ecuador) 1995	Champions	6	6	0	0	13	4
(Egypt) 1997	Runners-up	6	4	1	1	14	5
(New Zealand) 1999	Third place	6	4	2	0	19	6
(Trinidad and Tobago) 2001	Did not qualify						
(Finland) 2003	Did not qualify						
(Peru) 2005	Group stage	3	0	3	0	3	3
(South Korea) 2007	Fourth place	7	4	0	3	13	9
(Nigeria) 2009	Did not qualify						
(Mexico) 2011	Did not qualify						
(United Arab Emirates) 2013	Did not qualify						
(Chile) 2015	Did not qualify						
(India) 2017	Quarter-finals	5	3	0	2	8	3
(Brazil) 2019	Did not qualify						
(Indonesia) 2023	Did not qualify						
(Qatar) 2025	Did not qualify						
(Qatar) 2026	Did not qualify						
(Qatar) 2027	To be determined						
(Qatar) 2028	To be determined						
(Qatar) 2029	To be determined						
Total	9/24	48	30	10	8	94	39

=== Africa U-17 Cup of Nations Record ===
Year	Round	GP	W	D*	L	GS	GA
(Mali) 1995	Champions	5	5	0	0	16	1
(Botswana) 1997	Third place	5	3	0	2	9	6
(Guinea) 1999	Champions	5	3	1	1	8	3
(Seychelles) 2001	did not qualify						
(Eswatini) 2003	did not qualify						
(The Gambia) 2005	Runners-up	5	3	0	2	7	5
(Togo) 2007	Third place	5	3	0	2	11	5
(Algeria) 2009	did not qualify						
(Rwanda) 2011	did not qualify						
(Morocco) 2013	Group stage	3	0	2	1	2	7
(Niger) 2015	Disqualified						
(Gabon) 2017	Runners-up	5	2	2*	1	9	1
(Tanzania) 2019	did not qualify						
(Algeria) 2023	did not qualify						
(Morocco) 2025	did not qualify						
(Morocco) 2026	Group stage	4	1	1	2	7	6
(Morocco) 2027	TBD						
Total	7/15	37	20	6	11	69	34

=== CAF U-16 and U-17 World Cup Qualifiers record ===
Year	Round	GP	W	D*	L	GS	GA	GD
1985	did not participate							
1987	Second round	2	0	2	0	1	1	0
1989	Third round	4	2	1	1	5	3	+2
1991	Fourth round	5	3	1	1	8	3	+5
1993	Final Round	4	4	0	0	9	1	+8
Total	4/5	15	9	4	2	23	8	+15

*Draws include knockout matches decided on penalty kicks.

== Team honours ==
- FIFA U-17 World Cup winners: 2

1991, 1995

- FIFA U-17 World Cup runners-up: 2

1993, 1997

- FIFA U-17 World Cup third place: 1

1999

- Africa U-17 Cup of Nations winners: 2

1995, 1999

- Africa U-17 Cup of Nations runners-up: 2

2005, 2017

- Africa U-17 Cup of Nations third place: 2

1997, 2007

== Awards ==
=== Golden Shoe ===
Tournament	FIFA Golden Shoe Award	Player
(New Zealand) 1999	Golden Shoe Award	(Ghana) Ishmael Addo
(Italy) 1991	Silver Shoe Award	(Ghana) Nii Odartey Lamptey
(South Korea) 2007	Silver Shoe Award	(Ghana) Ransford Osei
(Egypt) 1997	Bronze Shoe Award	(Ghana) Owusu Afriyie

=== Golden Ball ===
Tournament	FIFA Golden Ball Winner
(Italy) 1991	(Ghana) Nii Odartey Lamptey
(Japan) 1993	(Ghana) Daniel Addo

== Notable players ==
The following list consist of previous Ghana U-17 national team players who have won or were influential at the FIFA U-17 World Cup with the Ghana U-17 national team or the FIFA U-20 World Cup with the Ghana U-20 national team, and those who were part of the Ghana U-23 national team that won the bronze medal at the 1992 Summer Olympics. The list also includes the players who have graduated from the Ghana U-20 national team and gone on to represent the senior Ghana national team at the FIFA World Cup or African Cup of Nations:

- Nii Odartey Lamptey (1991)
- Mohammed Gargo (1991)
- Yaw Preko (1991)
- Daniel Addo (1991, 1993)
- Samuel Kuffour (1991, 1993)
- Mark Edusei (1991, 1993)
- Charles Akunnor (1993)
- Emmanuel Duah (1991, 1993)
- Isaac Asare (1991)
- Mohammed Gargo (1991)
- Christian Gyan (1995)
- Awudu Issaka (1995)
- Stephen Appiah (1995)
- Emmanuel Bentil (1995)
- Daniel Quaye (1997)
- Laryea Kingston (1997)
- Hamza Mohammed (1997)
- Owusu Afriyie (1997)
- Razak Pimpong (1999)
- Michael Essien (1999)
- Anthony Obodai (1999)
- Ibrahim Abdul Razak (1999)
- Ishmael Addo (1999)
- Sadat Bukari (2005)
- Opoku Agyemang (2005)
- Razak Salifu (2005)
- Jonathan Quartey (2005)
- Samuel Inkoom (2005)
- David Telfer (2005)
- Mubarak Wakaso (2005)
- Ransford Osei (2007)
- Daniel Opare (2007)
- Sadick Adams (2007)
- Abeiku Quansah (2007)
- Tetteh Nortey (2007)

== Notable coaches ==
FIFA Tourney	Manager name
(Italy) 1991	(Germany) Otto Pfister
(Japan) 1993	(Ghana) Isaac Paha
(Ecuador) 1995	(Ghana) Sam Arday
(Egypt) 1997	(Ghana) Emmanuel Kwesi Afranie
(New Zealand) 1999	(Ghana) Jones Attuquayefio
(Peru) 2005	(Ghana) David Duncan
(South Korea) 2007	(Ghana) Sellas Tetteh
(Libya) Four Nations Tournament	(Ghana) Emmanuel Kwesi Afranie
(India) 2017	(Ghana) Paa Kwesi Fabin

== Head-to-head record ==
The following table shows Ghana's head-to-head record in the FIFA U-17 World Cup.

Opponent	Pld	W	D	L	GF	GA	GD	Win %
Argentina	1	0	1	0	0	0	+0	0.00
Australia	1	1	0	0	1	0	+1	100.00
Bahrain	2	1	0	1	5	2	+3	50.00
Brazil	5	3	1	1	9	7	+2	60.00
Cuba	2	1	1	0	4	3	+1	50.00
China	1	0	1	0	1	1	+0	0.00
Chile	1	1	0	0	3	0	+3	100.00
Colombia	2	2	0	0	3	1	+2	100.00
Costa Rica	2	1	1	0	3	1	+2	50.00
Ecuador	1	1	0	0	2	1	+1	100.00
Germany	2	0	0	2	3	5	−2	0.00
India	1	1	0	0	4	0	+4	100.00
Italy	1	1	0	0	4	0	+4	100.00
Japan	2	2	0	0	2	0	+2	100.00
Mali	1	0	0	1	1	2	−1	0.00
Mexico	2	2	0	0	8	1	+7	100.00
Niger	1	1	0	0	2	0	+2	100.00
Nigeria	1	0	0	1	1	2	−1	0.00
Oman	2	2	0	0	7	2	+5	100.00
Peru	2	1	1	0	3	1	+2	50.00
Portugal	1	1	0	0	2	0	+2	100.00
Qatar	1	0	1	0	0	0	+0	0.00
Scotland	1	0	1	0	0	0	+0	0.00
Spain	5	2	2	1	6	5	+1	40.00
Thailand	1	1	0	0	7	1	+6	100.00
Trinidad and Tobago	1	1	0	0	4	1	+3	100.00
United States	3	2	0	1	4	1	+3	66.67
Uruguay	2	2	0	0	5	2	+3	100.00
Total	48	30	10	8	94	39	+55	62.50

== See also ==
- Ghana national football team
- Ghana national U23 football team
- Ghana national U20 football team
