= Niger national under-17 football team =

National under-17 association football team representing Niger

Niger U-17
- Nickname: Ménas
- Association: Fédération Nigerienne de Football
- Confederation: CAF (Africa)
- Sub-confederation: WAFU (West Africa)
- Head coach: Francisco Castano Benito
- FIFA code: NIG
| First colours | Second colours |

First international
- Somalia 0-3 Niger (Mogadishu, Somalia; 15 August 2008)

Biggest win
- Somalia 0-3 Niger (Mogadishu, Somalia; 15 August 2008)

Biggest defeat
- Nigeria 6-0 Niger (Kano, Nigeria; 23 September 2009); Nigeria 6-0 Niger (Nigeria; 20 September 2012)

U-17 Africa Cup of Nations
- Appearances: 2 (first in 2015)
- Best result: Fourth place (2017)

FIFA U-17 World Cup
- Appearances: 1 (first in 2017)
- Best result: Round of 16 (2017)

The Niger national under-17 football team is the U-17 football team for Niger. The team represents the country in international under-17 matches and is controlled by the Fédération Nigerienne de Football.

== Tournament Records ==
=== FIFA U-17 World Cup record ===
FIFA U-17 World Cup
| Year | Round | PLD | W | D* | L | GS | GA |
|---|---|---|---|---|---|---|---|
| (China) 1985 | Did not participate | | | | | | |
| (Canada) 1987 | Did not participate | | | | | | |
| (Scotland) 1989 | Did not participate | | | | | | |
| (Italy) 1991 | Did not participate | | | | | | |
| (Japan) 1993 | Did not participate | | | | | | |
| (Ecuador) 1995 | Did not participate | | | | | | |
| (Egypt) 1997 | Did not participate | | | | | | |
| (New Zealand) 1999 | Did not participate | | | | | | |
| (Trinidad and Tobago) 2001 | Did not participate | | | | | | |
| (Finland) 2003 | Withdrew | | | | | | |
| (Peru) 2005 | Did not participate | | | | | | |
| (South Korea) 2007 | Did not participate | | | | | | |
| (Nigeria) 2009 | Disqualified | | | | | | |
| (Mexico) 2011 | Did not qualify | | | | | | |
| (United Arab Emirates) 2013 | Did not qualify | | | | | | |
| (Chile) 2015 | Did not qualify | | | | | | |
| (India) 2017 | Round of 16 | 4 | 1 | 0 | 3 | 1 | 8 |
| (Brazil) 2019 | Did not qualify | | | | | | |
| (Indonesia) 2023 | Did not qualify | | | | | | |
| (Qatar) 2025 | Did not qualify | | | | | | |
| (Qatar) 2026 | Did not qualify | | | | | | |
| Total | 1/21 | 4 | 1 | 0 | 3 | 1 | 8 |

=== U-17 Africa Cup of Nations record ===
U-17 Africa Cup of Nations
| Year | Round | PLD | W | D* | L | GS | GA |
|---|---|---|---|---|---|---|---|
| (Mali) 1995 | Did not participate | | | | | | |
| (Botswana) 1997 | Did not participate | | | | | | |
| (Guinea) 1999 | Did not participate | | | | | | |
| (Seychelles) 2001 | Did not participate | | | | | | |
| (Eswatini) 2003 | Withdrew | | | | | | |
| (The Gambia) 2005 | Did not participate | | | | | | |
| (Togo) 2007 | Did not participate | | | | | | |
| (Algeria) 2009 | Disqualified | | | | | | |
| (Rwanda) 2011 | Did not participate | | | | | | |
| (Morocco) 2013 | Did not qualify | | | | | | |
| (Niger) 2015 | Group stage | 3 | 1 | 0 | 2 | 3 | 5 |
| (Gabon) 2017 | Fourth place | 5 | 1 | 2 | 2 | 4 | 5 |
| (Tanzania) 2019 | Did not qualify | | | | | | |
| (Algeria) 2023 | Did not qualify | | | | | | |
| (Morocco) 2025 | Did not qualify | | | | | | |
| Total | 2/15 | 8 | 2 | 2 | 4 | 7 | 10 |

- Red border color indicates tournament was held on home soil.

*Draws include knockout matches decided on penalty kicks.

== Current squad ==
The following players were selected to compete in the 2017 FIFA U-17 World Cup.

Head coach: (Niger) Ismaila Tiemoko

| No. | Pos. | Player | Date of birth (age) | Club |
|---|---|---|---|---|
| 1 | GK | Mousa Laouali | 13 December 2000 (age 25) | (Nigerien Football Federation) GNN |
| 16 | GK | Abdoulaye Boubacar | 1 January 2001 (age 25) | (Nigerien Football Federation) APO River |
| 21 | GK | Khaled Lawali | 15 July 2000 (age 25) | (Nigerien Football Federation) Sahel |
| 3 | DF | Mahamadou Mahamane | 12 October 2001 (age 24) | (Nigerien Football Federation) Nigelec |
| 4 | DF | Nasser Mahaman | 24 September 2000 (age 25) | (Nigerien Football Federation) Air Academie |
| 5 | DF | Farouk Idrissa | 12 February 2000 (age 26) | (Nigerien Football Federation) Lazaret |
| 12 | DF | Djibrilla Ibrahim | 2 March 2002 (age 24) | (Nigerien Football Federation) Douanes |
| 15 | DF | Rachid Soumana | 1 January 2000 (age 26) | (Ghana Football Association) Tudu Mighty Jets |
| 18 | DF | Ibrahim Namata | 10 May 2000 (age 26) | (Nigerien Football Federation) Soniantcha |
| 2 | MF | Yacine Wa Massamba | 9 March 2000 (age 26) | (Nigerien Football Federation) Nigelec |
| 6 | MF | Ismael Issaka | 1 January 2000 (age 26) | (Nigerien Football Federation) CBK |
| 7 | MF | Moctar Ousmane | 15 September 2000 (age 25) | (Nigerien Football Federation) Mano Dayak |
| 8 | MF | Habibou Sofiane | 1 January 2000 (age 26) | (Israel Football Association) Maccabi Haifa |
| 10 | MF | Rachid Alfari | 30 December 2000 (age 25) | (Nigerien Football Federation) Nigelec |
| 11 | MF | Karim Tinni | 21 January 2001 (age 25) | (Nigerien Football Federation) Sahel |
| 13 | MF | Yacouba Aboubacar | 1 January 2000 (age 26) | (Nigerien Football Federation) Tahoua |
| 14 | MF | Kader Aboubacar | 31 December 2000 (age 25) | (Nigerien Football Federation) Akokana |
| 9 | FW | Kairou Amoustapha | 1 January 2001 (age 25) | (Nigerien Football Federation) Nigelec |
| 17 | FW | Ibrahim Boubacar Marou | 1 January 2000 (age 26) | (Nigerien Football Federation) Soniantcha |
| 19 | FW | Salim Abdourahmane | 2 September 2001 (age 24) | (Nigerien Football Federation) Jangorzo |
| 20 | FW | Hamid Galissoune | 26 January 2000 (age 26) | (Nigerien Football Federation) SACA Sport |

== Head-to-head record ==
The following table shows Niger's head-to-head record in the FIFA U-17 World Cup.

| Opponent | Pld | W | D | L | GF | GA | GD | Win % |
|---|---|---|---|---|---|---|---|---|
| Brazil | 1 | 0 | 0 | 1 | 0 | 2 | −2 | 0.00 |
| Ghana | 1 | 0 | 0 | 1 | 0 | 2 | −2 | 0.00 |
| North Korea | 1 | 1 | 0 | 0 | 1 | 0 | +1 | 100.00 |
| Spain | 1 | 0 | 0 | 1 | 0 | 4 | −4 | 0.00 |
| Total | 4 | 1 | 0 | 3 | 1 | 8 | −7 | 25.00 |
