= Eric Ayiah =

Ghanaian footballer (born 2000)

Personal information
- Date of birth: 6 March 2000 (age 26)
- Place of birth: Accra, Ghana
- Height: 1.83 m (6 ft 0 in)
- Positions: Winger; forward

Youth career
- –2018: Charity Stars
- 2018–2019: Monaco

Senior career*
Years	Team	Apps	(Gls)
2018–2022	Monaco B	42	(7)
2022–2023	Gil Vicente	0	(0)
2023–2025	Trofense	37	(11)
2025–2026	Felgueiras	11	(1)
2025–2026	→ Varzim (loan)	8	(0)
2026	→ União de Santarém (loan)	13	(2)

International career^{‡}
2016–2017	Ghana U17	15	(12)
Medal record
Representing Ghana
Men's football
Africa U-17 Cup of Nations
Second place	2017 Gabon
- * Club domestic league appearances and goals as of 17 May 2026 ‡ National team caps and goals as of 30 December 2019 (UTC)

Eric Ayiah (born 6 March 2000) is a Ghanaian professional footballer who plays as a winger or forward. He is a former captain of the Ghana U17 Team. He was included in The Guardian's "Next Generation 2017".

== Early and personal life ==
Ayiah attended Fomena T.I. Ahmadiyya Senior High for his secondary school education. Whilst playing for the Ghana U17 team, Ayiah wore the number 6 jersey as a tribute to Ghana's Independence Day; 6 March, which is coincidentally also his birthday.

== Club career ==
Ayiah started his career in his native Ghana with lower-tier side Charity Stars at the age of ten. He rose through the ranks till he was promoted to the senior team who played in the Ghana Division Two League. In August 2018, he secured a move to AS Monaco after his exploits with the Ghana U17 team at both the 2017 Africa U-17 Cup of Nations and 2017 FIFA U-17 World Cup. He signed a five-year deal with the club.

He was linked with several clubs including Porto, AC Milan and Anderlecht of which he apparently rejected their offers and signed for Monaco.

On 1 September 2022, Ayiah signed a three-year contract with Primeira Liga club Gil Vicente.

On 4 October 2023, after terminating his contract with Gil Vicente, Ayiah signed a two-year contract with Liga 3 side Trofense.

== International career ==
Ayiah was the captain for the Ghanaian youth team, the Black Starlets, the Ghana U17 Team.

He served and played as captain at the 2017 Africa U-17 Cup of Nations where he came up as second top scorer to clinch the silver boot after scoring four goals and guided the Black Starlets to the silver medal at the competition. He also played in the 2017 FIFA U-17 World Cup. He was included in Goal's 10 players to watch out of for at the World Cup. He went he score three goals as Ghana reached the quarter-finals.

In December 2016, he was nominated for the Confederation of African Football (CAF) Youth Player of the year alongside Ghanaian women's footballer Sandra Owusu-Ansah and eventual winner Nigerian footballer Alex Iwobi. He was again nominated for CAF Youth Player of the year award in 2017. The award was eventually won by Zambian footballer Patson Daka.

== Career statistics ==
=== Club ===
As of 11 December 2021

Club	Season	League			Cup		Continental		Other		Total	
Club	Season	Division	Apps	Goals	Apps	Goals	Apps	Goals	Apps	Goals	Apps	Goals
Monaco B	2018–19	Championnat National 2	3	0	–		–		0	0	3	0
Monaco B	2019–20	Championnat National 2	10	3	–		–		0	0	10	3
Monaco B	2020–21	Championnat National 2	6	1	–		–		0	0	6	1
Monaco B	2021–22	Championnat National 2	13	2	–		–		0	0	13	2
Career total			32	6	0	0	0	0	0	0	32	6

== Honours ==
Ghana U17

- Africa U-17 Cup of Nations runners up: 2017

Individual

- CAF Youth Player of the year nominee: 2016, 2017
