= Guinea national under-17 football team =

National under-17 association football team representing Guinea

Guinea U-17
- Association: Fédération Guinéenne de Football
- Confederation: CAF (Africa)
- Sub-confederation: WAFU (West Africa)
- Home stadium: Stade du 28 Septembre
First colours	Second colours

U-17 Africa Cup of Nations
- Appearances: 7 (first in 1995)
- Best result: Runners-up (2019) (later null and voided)

FIFA U-17 World Cup
- Appearances: 5 (first in 1985)
- Best result: Fourth Place (1985)

The Guinea National Under-17 Football Team, represents Guinea in international football at an under-17 level and is controlled by the Fédération Guinéenne de Football. The team's first appearance on the world stage was in 1985 at the 1985 FIFA U-16 World Championship. They were originally to play in the 2019 FIFA U-17 World Cup in Brazil, but they were disqualified due to fielding two overage players. Guinea was replaced by Senegal.

== Honours ==
- U-17 Africa Cup of Nations
  - Third (3): 1995, 2015 and 2017
- FIFA U-17 World Cup:
  - Fourth (1): 1985

== Competitive record ==
=== FIFA U-16 and U-17 World Cup record ===
FIFA U-16 and U-17 World Cup
Year	Round	GP	W	D^{1}	L	GS	GA
(China) 1985	Fourth Place	6	3	0	3	7	7
(Canada) 1987	Did not qualify						
(Scotland) 1989	Group stage	3	0	3	0	4	4
(Italy) 1991	Did not qualify						
(Japan) 1993	Did not enter						
(Ecuador) 1995	Group stage	3	1	0	2	3	6
(Egypt) 1997	Did not qualify						
(New Zealand) 1999	Did not qualify						
(Trinidad and Tobago) 2001	Disqualified						
(Finland) 2003	Did not qualify						
(Peru) 2005	Did not qualify						
(South Korea) 2007	Did not qualify						
(Nigeria) 2009	Did not qualify						
(Mexico) 2011	Did not qualify						
(United Arab Emirates) 2013	Did not qualify						
(Chile) 2015	Group stage	3	0	1	2	2	5
(India) 2017	Group stage	3	0	1	2	4	8
(Brazil) 2019	Disqualified after qualifying						
(Indonesia) 2023	Banned						
(Qatar) 2025	Withdrew						
(Qatar) 2026	To be determined						
Total	5/20	18	4	5	9	20	30

=== U-17 Africa Cup of Nations record ===
U-17 Africa Cup of Nations
Hosts/Year	Round	GP	W	D*	L	GS	GA
(Mali) 1995	Third Place	5	2	1	2	6	8
(Botswana) 1997	Did not qualify						
(Guinea) 1999	Group stage	3	1	1	1	6	3
(Seychelles) 2001	Disqualified						
(Eswatini) 2003	Group stage	3	1	1	1	9	4
(The Gambia) 2005	Did not qualify						
(Togo) 2007	Did not qualify						
(Algeria) 2009	Group stage	3	0	1	2	0	2
(Rwanda) 2011	Did not qualify						
(Morocco) 2013	Did not qualify						
(Niger) 2015	Third Place	5	2	1	2	7	6
(Gabon) 2017	Third Place	5	2	3	0	9	3
(Tanzania) 2019	Runners-up	5	3	0	2	6	6
(Algeria) 2023	Did not enter						
(Morocco) 2025	Withdrew						
Total	7/14	29	11	8	10	33	32

=== CAF U-16 and U-17 World Cup Qualifiers record ===
CAF U-16 and U-17 World Cup Qualifiers
Appearances: 4
Year	Round	Position	Pld	W	D*	L	GF	GA
1985	Second Round		4	2	2	0	5	2
1987	Third Round		4	2	1	1	3	4
1989	Third Round		6	4	0	2	9	3
1991	Third Round		4	1	2	1	1	3
1993	Did not enter							
Total	4/5	Third Round	6	3	1	2	12	4

- Red border color indicates tournament was held on home soil.

*Draws include knockout matches decided on penalty kicks.

== Current squad ==
The following players were selected to compete in the 2017 FIFA U-17 World Cup.

Head Coach: (Guinea) Souleymane Camara

No.	Pos.	Player	Date of birth (age)	Club
1	GK	Ibrahima Sylla	7 December 2002 (age 23)	(Guinean Football Federation) Mendy
16	GK	Abdoulaye Doumbouya	1 September 2001 (age 25)	(Guinean Football Federation) Académie Football de Conakry
21	GK	Mohamed Camara	16 March 2000 (age 26)	(Guinean Football Federation) Académie Titi Camara
2	DF	Samuel Conte	13 March 2000 (age 26)	(Guinean Football Federation) Académie Horoya
3	DF	Ibrahima Sory Soumah	19 November 2001 (age 24)	(Guinean Football Federation) Académie Horoya
4	DF	Cherif Camara	21 October 2002 (age 24)	(Guinean Football Federation) Académie Sainte Marie
5	DF	Issiaga Camara	30 December 2002 (age 23)	(Guinean Football Federation) Académie Hafia FC
12	DF	M'bemba Camara	8 September 2000 (age 26)	(Guinean Football Federation) Académie AS Kaloum
17	DF	Ismaël Traoré	10 June 2000 (age 26)	(Guinean Football Federation) Académie FC Séquence
6	MF	Sékou Camara	27 July 2001 (age 25)	(Guinean Football Federation) Académie Sainte Marie
10	MF	Aguibou Camara	20 May 2001 (age 25)	(Guinean Football Federation) Académie Football de Conakry
14	MF	Salia Bangoura	15 November 2001 (age 24)	(Guinean Football Federation) Cefomig
15	MF	Blaise Camara	11 March 2000 (age 26)	(Guinean Football Federation) Esperance Conakry
18	MF	Elhadj Bah	22 August 2001 (age 25)	(Guinean Football Federation) Esperance Conakry
7	FW	Fandje Touré	1 November 2002 (age 24)	(Guinean Football Federation) Cefomig
8	FW	Lape Bangoura	31 December 2000 (age 25)	(Guinean Football Federation) Académie Football de Conakry
9	FW	Doss Soumah	6 February 2000 (age 26)	(Guinean Football Federation) Cefomig
11	FW	Djibril Sylla	10 November 2002 (age 24)	(Guinean Football Federation) Académie Antonio Souaré
13	FW	Seydouba Cisse	10 February 2001 (age 25)	(Guinean Football Federation) FC Attouga
19	FW	Naby Bangoura	24 April 2001 (age 25)	(Guinean Football Federation) Académie Sainte Marie
20	FW	Aly Soumah	10 January 2000 (age 26)	(Tunisian Football Federation) Étoile du Sahel

== See also ==
- Guinea national football team
- Guinea national under-23 football team
- Guinea national under-20 football team
