= Isaac Gyamfi =

Ghanaian footballer

Personal information
- Full name: Isaac Gyamfi
- Date of birth: 9 September 2000 (age 26)
- Place of birth: Accra, Ghana
- Height: 1.86 m (6 ft 1 in)
- Position: Central midfielder

Senior career*
Years	Team	Apps	(Gls)
2018–2020	Great Olympics	9	(0)
2020–2022	Tirana	22	(0)
2023	Medeama	2	(0)
2023	Energetik-BGU Minsk	13	(0)

International career
2017	Ghana U17	5	(0)
- * Club domestic league appearances and goals as of 24 December 2023

Isaac Gyamfi (born 9 September 2000) is a Ghanaian footballer who plays as a central midfielder.
