= Meshak Babanzila =

Gabonese footballer

Personal information
- Full name: Meshak Babanzila Mayala
- Date of birth: 11 June 2001 (age 25)
- Place of birth: Libreville, Gabon
- Height: 1.71 m (5 ft 7 in)
- Position: Midfielder

Team information
- Current team: Gimnàstic

Youth career
- 2012–2015: Samuel Eto'o Academy
- 2015–2019: AC Libreville
- 2019: Paris FC

Senior career*
Years	Team	Apps	(Gls)
2019–2022	Paris FC II	14	(1)
2022–2024	Terrassa	36	(0)
2024–2026	Europa	59	(3)
2026–	Gimnàstic	0	(0)

International career^{‡}
2017	Gabon U17	2	(0)
2023	Gabon U23	2	(0)
2025–	Gabon	1	(0)
- * Club domestic league appearances and goals as of 25 May 2026 ‡ National team caps and goals as of 22:41, 14 October 2025 (UTC)

Meshak Babanzila Mayala (born 11 June 2001), known as just Meshak in Spain, is a Gabonese professional footballer who plays as a midfielder for Spanish club Gimnàstic de Tarragona and the Gabon national team.

== Club career ==
A youth product of the Samuel Eto'o Academy, Babanzila finished his development with Académie Club de Libreville. In June 2019, he moved to the reserves of Paris FC in the Championnat National 3. Rarely used in his first two years, he spent the entire 2021–22 season without appearing for the side.

In July 2022, Babanzila went on a trial at Segunda Federación side Terrassa FC, later signing a contract with the club on 15 August. Regularly used, he agreed to a one-year extension on 14 June 2023, but left the side the following 6 May.

On 27 October 2024, after nearly five months without a club, Babanzila agreed to a deal with CE Europa of the Primera Federación. The following 26 June, he extended his contract with the club for a further season.

Babanzila was a regular starter for the Escapulats during the 2025–26 campaign as the club missed out promotion in the play-offs, and signed a three-year deal with fellow third division side Gimnàstic de Tarragona on 15 July 2026.

== International career ==
Babanzila represented the Gabon national under-17 team in the 2017 U-17 Africa Cup of Nations, and also featured with the under-23 side in the 2023 U-23 Africa Cup of Nations. On 31 May 2025, he received his first call-up to the full side for two friendlies against Niger and Guinea Bissau, and made his full international debut on 9 June, coming on as a late substitute for Shorla Aboghe in a 2–0 win over the latter at the El Bachir Stadium in Mohammedia, Morocco.

== Personal life ==
Babanzila was assaulted during a home-robbery at the house of fellow Gabonese footballer Pierre-Emerick Aubameyang in August 2022.
