= Aníbal Vega =

Paraguayan footballer (born 2000)

Personal information
- Full name: Aníbal Gabriel Vega da Silva
- Date of birth: 18 March 2000 (age 26)
- Place of birth: Pedro Juan Caballero, Paraguay
- Height: 1.81 m (5 ft 11 in)
- Position: Striker

Team information
- Current team: General Caballero de Juan León Mallorquin
- Number: 18

Youth career
- Palmeiras

Senior career*
Years	Team	Apps	(Gls)
2020–2022	Palmeiras	0	(0)
2021	→ Vitória (loan)	3	(0)
2021–2022	→ União Leiria (loan)	6	(0)
2023–	Sportivo Ameliano	26	(2)

International career
2017	Paraguay U17	2	(2)
2019	Paraguay U20	2	(0)
- * Club domestic league appearances and goals as of 23:37, 18 April 2024 (UTC)

Aníbal Gabriel Vega da Silva (born 18 March 2000) is a Paraguayan professional footballer who plays as a striker for Sportivo Ameliano.

== Early life ==
Vega started playing football for the San Pedro Football Academy in Paraguay.

== Club career ==
Vega started his career with Brazilian top flight side Palmeiras. In 2021, he signed for Portuguese third tier side União de Leiria.

== International career ==
Vega has represented Paraguay internationally at youth level. He is eligible to represent Brazil internationally through his mother.

== Personal life ==
Vega is the son of a Paraguayan futsal player and a Brazilian woman.
