= 1985 African U-16 Qualifying for World Cup =

Tournament details
- Teams: 8 (from 1 confederation)

Final positions
- Champions: Congo; Guinea; Nigeria

The 1985 African U-16 Qualifying for World Cup was the first qualifying edition organized by the Confederation of African Football (CAF) into the FIFA U-16 World Championship. The three winners qualified for the 1985 FIFA U-16 World Championship.

== First round ==
The winners advanced to the Second Round.

Team 1	Agg.	Team 2	1st leg	2nd leg
Guinea	3–1	Algeria	3–1	0–0
Zambia	4–2	Lesotho	3–0	1–2

Guinea	3−1	Algeria

Algeria	0−0	Guinea

Guinea qualified after 3−1 on aggregate.

Zambia	3−0	Lesotho

Lesotho	2−1	Zambia

Zambia qualified after 4−2 on aggregate.

== Second round ==
The winners qualified for the 1985 FIFA U-16 World Championship.

Team 1	Agg.	Team 2	1st leg	2nd leg
Nigeria	2–1	Togo	1–0	1–1
Egypt	1–2	Guinea	1–1	0–1
Zambia	2–2 (2–4 p)	Congo	2–0	0–2

Nigeria	1−0	Togo

Togo	1−1	Nigeria

Nigeria qualified after 2−1 on aggregate.

Egypt	1−1	Guinea

Guinea	1−0	Egypt

Guinea qualified after 2−1 on aggregate.

Zambia	2–0	Congo

Congo	2–0	Zambia
Penalties
	4–2

Congo qualified following a penalty shootout (4–2) after a draw of 2–2 on aggregate.

== Countries to participate in 1985 FIFA U-16 World Championship ==
The following three teams qualified for 1985 FIFA U-16 World Championship.

- Congo
- Guinea
- Nigeria
