= Edmund Arko-Mensah =

Ghanaian footballer (born 2001)

Personal information
- Date of birth: 9 September 2001 (age 25)
- Height: 1.72 m (5 ft 8 in)
- Position: Left winger

Team information
- Current team: Gnistan
- Number: 12

Youth career
- –2018: Legon Cities

Senior career*
Years	Team	Apps	(Gls)
2018–2019	Legon Cities		
2018	→ Berekum Chelsea (loan)	8	(1)
2020	Honka II	2	(1)
2020–2023	Honka	91	(8)
2024	Dinamo Batumi	4	(0)
2025–	Gnistan	51	(3)

International career^{‡}
2017	Ghana U17	7	(0)
2023–	Ghana U23	3	(0)
- * Club domestic league appearances and goals as of 13 November 2026 ‡ National team caps and goals as of 30 June 2023

Edmund Arko-Mensah (born 9 September 2001) is a Ghanaian footballer who plays as a left-winger for Veikkausliiga club IF Gnistan.

== Club career ==
Mensah was transferred to Berekum Chelsea on loan on 4 February 2018.

Mensah joined Veikkausliiga team Honka in October 2019, starting in the 2020 season. He spent four seasons with Honka, making 91 league appearances and scoring eight goals, plus winning the Finnish League Cup.

Mensah joined Georgian club Dinamo Batumi on 9 February 2024. His time in Georgia was limited to just four appearances from the bench.

Mensah returned to Finland and joined Veikkausliiga club Gnistan in November 2024 on a two-year deal. A landmark game for his new club came on 10 May 2025 as he scored twice and made an assist in a 3–2 away win over AC Oulu before being sent off in the final minutes of the game.

== International career ==
In 2017, Arko-Mensah made his international debut for the Ghana U17 national team.

In June 2023, Arko-Mensah was named in the squad of the Ghana under-23 national team, for the 2023 U-23 Africa Cup of Nations final tournament, where he played in all three of Ghana's group stage matches.

== Career statistics ==
As of 24 June 2024

Club	Season	League			Cup (Note: Includes Suomen Cup)		League cup (Note: Includes Finnish League Cup)		Continental		Total	
Club	Season	Division	Apps	Goals	Apps	Goals	Apps	Goals	Apps	Goals	Apps	Goals
Berekum Chelsea (loan)	2018	Ghana Premier League	8	1	0	0	—		—		8	1
Honka Akatemia	2020	Kakkonen	2	1	0	0	—		—		2	1
Honka	2020	Veikkausliiga	17	0	5	0	—		0	0	22	0
Honka	2021	Veikkausliiga	23	2	5	0	—		4 (Note: Appearances in UEFA Europa Conference League)	0	32	2
Honka	2022	Veikkausliiga	25	3	1	0	4	1	—		30	4
Honka	2023	Veikkausliiga	26	3	3	0	2	0	1	0	32	3
Honka	Total		91	8	14	0	6	1	5	0	116	9
Dinamo Batumi	2024	Erovnuli Liga	4	0	0	0	—		—		4	0
Gnistan	2025	Veikkausliiga	0	0	0	0	3	0	–		3	0
Career total			106	10	14	0	9	1	5	0	133	11

== Honours ==
Honka

- Finnish League Cup: 2022
- Finnish Cup runner-up: 2023
