= Richard Danso =

Ghanaian footballer

Personal information
- Date of birth: 16 September 2000 (age 26)
- Place of birth: Accra, Ghana
- Height: 1.78 m (5 ft 10 in)
- Position: Winger

Team information
- Current team: Tirana
- Number: 90

Youth career
- WAFA

Senior career*
Years	Team	Apps	(Gls)
2017–2019	WAFA	31	(7)
2019	→ North Texas SC (loan)	12	(2)
2019–	ES Sahel		
2020–	→ WAFA (loan)		
2020–2022	Tirana	25	(0)
2021–2022	Tirana U-21	2	(1)
2023–	Aduana Stars	14	(1)
2023–	→Nations FC (loan)	3	(0)

International career^{‡}
2017	Ghana U17	4	(2)
2018	Ghana U20	?	(2)
2019	Ghana U23	?	(0)
- * Club domestic league appearances and goals as of 20 October 2019 ‡ National team caps and goals as of 15 July 2019

Richard Danso (born 16 September 2000) is a Ghanaian footballer who most recently played as a forward for Tirana in Albanian Superliga.

== Club career ==
Danso was set to move to Tunisian side Étoile du Sahel in January 2019 on a deal through 2022 after impressing in the Ghanaian Premier League. However, the deal fell through after an international transfer certificate could not be obtained. Instead, Danso joined North Texas SC on a loan until the end of the season.

== Honours ==
WAFA

- Ghana Premier League Runner-Up: 2017

== Career statistics ==
As of July 15, 2019

Club	League	Season	League		Playoffs		Cup		Total	
Club	League	Season	Apps	Goals	Apps	Goals	Apps	Goals	Apps	Goals
WAFA	Ghanaian Premier League	2017	17	4	–		–		17	4
WAFA	Ghanaian Premier League	2018	14	3	–		–		14	3
WAFA	Total		31	7	–		–		31	7
Career total			31	7	0	0	0	0	31	7
