= Mohamed Camara (footballer, born March 2000) =

Guinean footballer

Personal information
- Full name: Mohamed Richard Camara
- Date of birth: 16 March 2000 (age 26)
- Height: 1.94 m (6 ft 4 in)
- Position: Goalkeeper

Team information
- Current team: Kaloum
- Number: 1

Youth career
- Académie Titi Camara

Senior career*
Years	Team	Apps	(Gls)
2021–	CI Kamsar		

International career^{‡}
2017	Guinea U17	4	(0)
2021–	Guinea	1	(0)
- * Club domestic league appearances and goals as of 23 December 2021 ‡ National team caps and goals as of 23 December 2021

Mohamed Camara (born 16 March 2000) is a Guinean footballer who currently plays as a goalkeeper for CI Kamsar. He is the son of Guinean goalkeeping legend Kemoko Camara.

== Career statistics ==
=== International ===
As of matches played 23 December 2021.

Appearances and goals by national team and year
National team	Year	Apps	Goals
Guinea	2021	1	0
Total		1	0
