= Joshua Canales =

Honduran footballer (born 2000)

Personal information
- Full name: Joshua Antonio Canales Hernández
- Date of birth: 20 July 2000 (age 26)
- Place of birth: San José, Costa Rica
- Height: 1.73 m (5 ft 8 in)
- Position: Midfielder

Team information
- Current team: Aucas
- Number: 20

Youth career
- –2018: Olimpia
- 2019–2020: Carmelita

Senior career*
Years	Team	Apps	(Gls)
2021–2022	Querétaro	1	(0)
2022	→ Tlaxcala (loan)	14	(0)
2023–2024	Celaya	16	(0)
2024–2025	Herediano	15	(2)
2024	→ Santos Guápiles (loan)	12	(0)
2025–	Aucas	1	(0)

International career^{‡}
2017	Honduras U17	6	(1)
- * Club domestic league appearances and goals as of 20 August 2025 ‡ National team caps and goals as of 17:14, 3 March 2021 (UTC)

Joshua Antonio Canales Hernández (born 20 July 2000) is a professional footballer who plays as a midfielder for Ecuadorian Serie A club Aucas. Born in Costa Rica, Canales has represented Honduras at youth international level.

== International career ==
Canales was born in Costa Rican, and is of Honduran descent through his father. He is a youth international for Honduras.

== Career statistics ==
=== Club ===
As of 3 March 2021.

Club	Season	League			Cup		Continental		Other		Total	
Club	Season	Division	Apps	Goals	Apps	Goals	Apps	Goals	Apps	Goals	Apps	Goals
Querétaro	2020–21	Liga MX	1	0	0	0	–		0	0	1	0
Career total			1	0	0	0	0	0	0	0	1	0
