= Gideon Acquah =

Ghanaian footballer (born 2000)

Personal information
- Date of birth: 24 May 2000 (age 26)
- Height: 1.82 m (5 ft 11 1/2 in)
- Position: Defender

Team information
- Current team: Torre del Mar

Youth career
- –2018: Accra United
- 2018–2019: Medeama
- 2018–2019: → Extremadura (youth loan)

Senior career*
Years	Team	Apps	(Gls)
2017–2018	Accra United		
2017	→ Bofoakwa Tano (loan)		
2018–2019	Medeama	12	(0)
2019–2023	Montijo	76	(2)
2022	→ Istra 1961 (loan)	0	(0)
2023–2024	Atlético Pueblonuevo	33	(2)
2024–2025	Villafranca	32	(0)
2025–	Torre del Mar	10	(0)

International career^{‡}
2017	Ghana U17	4	(0)
- * Club domestic league appearances and goals as of 9 November 2025 ‡ National team caps and goals as of 14:44, 28 November 2018 (UTC)

Gideon Acquah (born 24 May 2000) is a Ghanaian footballer who plays as a defender for Spanish Tercera Federación club Torre del Mar.

== Career statistics ==
=== Club ===
As of 28 November 2018.

Club	Season	League			Cup		Continental		Other		Total	
Club	Season	Division	Apps	Goals	Apps	Goals	Apps	Goals	Apps	Goals	Apps	Goals
Medeama	2018	Ghanaian Premier League	12	0	0	0	0	0	0	0	12	0
Career total			12	0	0	0	0	0	0	0	12	0
