= Ibrahim Sulley =

Ghanaian footballer

Personal information
- Date of birth: 6 August 2001 (age 25)
- Place of birth: Accra, Ghana
- Height: 1.69 m (5 ft 6 1/2 in)
- Position: Attacking midfielder

Team information
- Current team: Al-Sadaqa

Youth career
- –2019: Rising Stars Academy

Senior career*
| Years | Team | Apps | (Gls) |
| 2019–2020 | Great Olympics | 9 | (2) |
| 2020–2021 | Tirana | 2 | (0) |
| 2020–2021 | → Tirana U-21 | 8 | (0) |
| 2021–2023 | Great Olympics | 42 | (3) |
| 2026 | DPMM | 10 | (0) |
| 2026– | Al-Sadaqa | 0 | (0) |

International career^{‡}
| 2017 | Ghana U17 | 7 | (1) |
| 2019 | Ghana U20 | 1 | (0) |
- * Club domestic league appearances and goals as of 7 October 2026 ‡ National team caps and goals as of 9 February 2019

Ibrahim Sulley (born 6 July 2001) is a Ghanaian footballer who plays as an attacking midfielder for Al-Sadaqa of the Libyan Premier League. He played for KF Tirana before rejoining his former club Great Olympics in July 2021.
