= 1999 African U-17 Championship =

Tournament details
- Host country: Guinea
- City: Conakry
- Dates: 16–30 May
- Teams: 8 (from 1 confederation)

Final positions
- Champions: Ghana (2nd title)
- Runners-up: Burkina Faso
- Third place: Mali
- Fourth place: Cameroon

Tournament statistics
- Matches played: 16
- Goals scored: 37 (2.31 per match)

The 1999 African U-17 Championship was a football competition organized by the Confederation of African Football (CAF). The tournament took place in Guinea. The top three teams qualified for the 1999 FIFA U-17 World Championship.

== Qualification ==
=== Qualified teams ===
- Angola
- Burkina Faso
- Cameroon
- Ghana
- Guinea (host nation)
- Mali
- Nigeria
- Zimbabwe

== Group stage ==
=== Group A ===
Pos	Team	Pld	W	D	L	GF	GA	GD	Pts	Qualification
1	Cameroon	3	1	2	0	4	3	+1	5	Knockout stage
2	Burkina Faso	3	1	2	0	3	2	+1	5	Knockout stage
3	Guinea (H)	3	1	1	1	6	3	+3	4	
4	Zimbabwe	3	0	1	2	1	6	−5	1	

Rules for classification: Group stage tiebreakers
(H) Hosts
16 May 1999

Guinea	1 – 1	Cameroon

Stade du 28 Septembre, Conakry

16 May 1999

Zimbabwe	0 – 0	Burkina Faso

Stade du 28 Septembre, Conakry

19 May 1999

Cameroon	1 – 1	Burkina Faso

Stade du 28 Septembre, Conakry

19 May 1999

Guinea	4 – 0	Zimbabwe

Stade du 28 Septembre, Conakry

22 May 1999

Cameroon	2 – 1	Zimbabwe

Stade du 28 Septembre, Conakry

22 May 1999

Guinea	1 – 2	Burkina Faso

Stade du 28 Septembre, Conakry

=== Group B ===
Pos	Team	Pld	W	D	L	GF	GA	GD	Pts	Qualification
1	Mali	3	1	2	0	5	4	+1	5	Knockout stage
2	Ghana	3	1	1	1	4	2	+2	4	Knockout stage
3	Nigeria	3	1	1	1	5	5	0	4	
4	Angola	3	1	0	2	2	5	−3	3	

Rules for classification: Group stage tiebreakers
17 May 1999

Ghana	3 – 0	Angola

Stade du 28 Septembre, Conakry

17 May 1999

Mali	3 – 3	Nigeria

Stade du 28 Septembre, Conakry

20 May 1999

Ghana	0 – 0	Mali

Stade du 28 Septembre, Conakry

20 May 1999

Angola	1 – 0	Nigeria

Stade du 28 Septembre, Conakry

23 May 1999

Angola	1 – 2	Mali

Stade du 28 Septembre, Conakry

23 May 1999

Nigeria	2 – 1	Ghana

Stade du 28 Septembre, Conakry

== Knock-out stage ==
Semi-finals
27 May - Conakry
Cameroon	0
Ghana	1
27 May - Conakry
Mali	0
Burkina Faso	1

Final
30 May - Conakry
Ghana	3
Burkina Faso	1
Third place
30 May - Conakry
Cameroon	0
Mali	1

=== Semi-finals ===
27 May 1999

Cameroon	0–1	Ghana
		B. Bortey 38'

Stade du 28 Septembre, Conakry

27 May 1999

Mali	0–1	Burkina Faso
		Barro 35'

Stade du 28 Septembre, Conakry

=== Third place match ===
30 May 1999

Cameroon	0–1	Mali
		Mamadou Diawara 19'

Stade du 28 Septembre, Conakry

=== Final ===
30 May 1999

Ghana	3–1	Burkina Faso
K. Mensah 12'; N. Lamptey 33'; B. Bortey 43'		Barro 63'

Stade du 28 Septembre, Conakry

== Winners ==
1999 CAF Under-17 Championship
(Ghana)
Ghana
Second title

== Countries to participate in 1999 FIFA U-17 World Championship ==
The 3 teams which qualified for 1999 FIFA U-17 World Championship.

- Ghana
- Burkina Faso
- Mali
