= Elhadj Bah =

Guinean footballer

Personal information
- Full name: Elhadj Abdourahamane Bah
- Date of birth: 22 August 2001 (age 25)
- Place of birth: Boké, Guinea
- Height: 1.83 m (6 ft 0 in)
- Positions: Midfielder; forward

Team information
- Current team: Stade Beaucairois

Youth career
- Académie Sainte Marie de Dixinn

Senior career*
Years	Team	Apps	(Gls)
2017–2018	Fello Star		
2018–2019	Satellite		
2019–2020	Santoba		
2020–2021	CI Kamsar		(21)
2021–2025	Samsunspor	6	(0)
2022–2023	→ Châteaubriant (loan)	22	(5)
2023–2024	→ Dunkerque (loan)	18	(1)
2024–2025	→ Châteaubriant (loan)	5	(0)
2025	Yenicami Ağdelen	16	(11)
2025–	Stade Beaucairois	11	(7)

International career^{‡}
2017	Guinea U17	3	(0)
2021	Guinea	1	(0)
- * Club domestic league appearances and goals as of 22 March 2026 ‡ National team caps and goals as of 00:57, 21 September 2021 (UTC)

Elhadj Abdourahamane Bah (born 22 August 2001) is a Guinean professional footballer who plays as a midfielder and forward for French Championnat National 3 club Stade Beaucairois.

== Club career ==
Best player and top scorer of the Guinée Championnat National in the previous season, Bah signed for Turkish club Samsunspor on a five-year contract on 6 September 2021. In 2022, he was loaned out to French club Châteaubriant for the season.

== International career ==
On 28 March 2021, Bah made his debut for the Guinea national team in a 2–1 loss to Namibia in Africa Cup of Nations qualification.

== Honours ==
Individual

- Guinée Championnat National best player: 2020–21
- Guinée Championnat National top goalscorer: 2020–21
