= Stéphane Zobo =

Cameroonian footballer (born 2000)

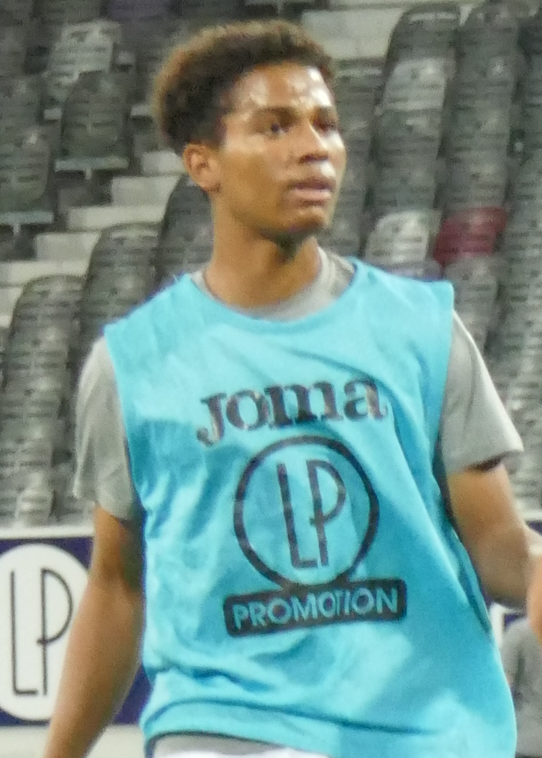
- Zobo with Toulouse in 2020

Personal information
- Full name: Stéphane Thierry Zobo
- Date of birth: 2 August 2000 (age 26)
- Place of birth: Yaoundé, Cameroon
- Height: 1.88 m (6 ft 2 in)
- Position: Forward

Youth career
- –2018: AS Azur Star
- 2018–2019: Toulouse

Senior career*
Years	Team	Apps	(Gls)
2019–2022	Toulouse B	29	(3)
2021–2022	Toulouse	1	(0)
2022	Béziers	16	(7)
2022–2023	Les Herbiers	19	(4)
2023–2024	Le Pays du Valois	16	(9)
2024–2025	Lyon-La Duchère	16	(2)

International career^{‡}
2019	Cameroon U23	2	(0)
- * Club domestic league appearances and goals as of 17 May 2025 ‡ National team caps and goals as of 20:26, 20 August 2022 (UTC)

Stéphane Thierry Zobo (born 2 August 2000) is a Cameroonian professional footballer who plays as a forward.

== Club career ==
Zobo made his professional debut for Toulouse in a 1–0 Coupe de France win over Niort on 20 January 2021. His Ligue 2 debut came on 24 July 2021, as he came on as a substitute in a 2–2 draw against Ajaccio. On 10 January 2022, his contract with Toulouse was terminated by mutual consent. He made a total of five appearances for the club.

On 11 January 2022, Zobo signed for Championnat National 2 side Béziers. He moved to fellow National 2 side Les Herbiers in the summer of 2022.

== International career ==
In the 2019 Africa U-23 Cup of Nations, Zobo made a total of two appearances for the Cameroon U23 national team.

== Personal life ==
Zobo's brother Stève Mvoué is also a footballer. They were teammates at Toulouse.

== Honours ==
Toulouse

- Ligue 2: 2021–22
