= Ibrahim Marou =

Nigerien footballer

Personal information
- Full name: Ibrahim Boubacar Marou
- Date of birth: 1 January 2000 (age 26)
- Place of birth: Tillabéri, Niger
- Height: 1.73 m (5 ft 8 in)
- Position: Forward

Team information
- Current team: AS FAN

Senior career*
Years	Team	Apps	(Gls)
2017–2019	Liberté FC		
2019–2020	Ilirija	1	(0)
2020–	AS FAN		

International career^{‡}
2017	Niger U17	9	(1)
2019	Niger U20	3	(0)
2021–	Niger	5	(0)
- * Club domestic league appearances and goals ‡ National team caps and goals as of 02:13, 21 October 2021 (UTC)

Ibrahim Boubacar Marou (born 1 January 2000) is a Nigerien professional footballer who plays as a forward for Niger Premier League club AS FAN and the Niger national team.
