= Charity Stars F.C. =

Football team in Ghana

- Full name: Charity Stars Football Club
- Founded: 1992; 33 years ago
- Ground: Charity Park
- Owner: Abram Owusu Amoah
- League: Division Two League, Ghana
Home colours	Away colours

Charity Stars Football Club is a Ghanaian professional football club based in Accra in the Greater Accra Region of Ghana. The club currently competes in Great Accra Region Zone of the Division Two League which is the third tier of the football league system in Ghana, and the MTN FA Cup.

== History ==
In 1992, Charity Stars Football Club was formed as an initiative of Abram Owusu Amoah, a Christian Minister, Leader and Founder of The Gentiles Revival Ministry, a religious charity aimed at evangelizing the word of God and helping the needy in society. As part of the ministry's charity community outreach development program, destitute and orphaned children at the ministry's affiliate branch in Bubiashie, a suburb of Accra, Ghana were mobilized to form a colt's team (youth) named Charity Stars Football Club.

The team began organizing trials and playing matches within Bubiashie and its outskirts until it was registered and joined Greater Accra Colts League (later branded as Milo Colts League).

As of 2021, the team plays in the Greater Accra Regional Football Association (GARFA) Division Two League.

In 2021, the club was named in the FIFA's 10 year (2011–2020) international transfers report as one Confederation of African Football (CAF)'s top 30 clubs based on their number outgoing transfers, coming in as the 26th.

The most notable amongst those transfers is Emmanuel Boateng who previously played for Rio Ave, Moreirense, Levante and currently plying his trade in the Chinese Super League with Dalian Professional.

== Grounds ==
The club plays their home matches at the Charity Park in Bubiashie in Accra.

== Notable players ==
See: Category:Charity Stars F.C. players
