= Djibril Fandjé Touré =

Guinean footballer (born 2002)

Fandjé Touré
Personal information
- Full name: Djibril Fandjé Touré
- Date of birth: 1 November 2002 (age 24)
- Place of birth: Conakry, Guinea
- Height: 1.75 m (5 ft 9 in)
- Position: Striker

Team information
- Current team: Yadanarbon
- Number: 9

Youth career
- –2021: Cefomig University

Senior career*
| Years | Team | Apps | (Gls) |
| 2021–2023 | Watford | 0 | (0) |
| 2021 | → Charleroi (loan) | 0 | (0) |
| 2021–2022 | → SV Horn (loan) | 9 | (0) |
| 2023–2025 | Vyškov | 12 | (2) |
| 2026 | Real Kashmir | 3 | (0) |
| 2026– | Yadanarbon | 0 | (0) |

International career^{‡}
| 2017 | Guinea U17 | 6 | (4) |
- * Club domestic league appearances and goals as of 19:43, 13 March 2026 (UTC) ‡ National team caps and goals as of 16:53, 31 January 2020 (UTC)

Djibril Fandjé Touré (born 1 November 2002) is a Guinean professional footballer who plays as a forward for Myanmar National League club Yadanarbon. He was included in The Guardian's "Next Generation 2019".

== Career ==
On 29 September 2020, it was announced Touré would join Watford on a five-and-a-half-year contract effective from 1 January 2021. He also had trials with Borussia Dortmund, Bayern Munich, Roma and Nice over a 12-month period before joining The Hornets.

Touré joined Charleroi on loan for the remainder of the season on 1 February 2021. However, due to travel restrictions, he only started training with the team during the month of April. On 1 September 2021, Touré was loaned out to Austrian Second League side SV Horn for two seasons until June 2023. His loan was shortened, and he returned to Watford on 1 September 2022.

== Career statistics ==
=== Club ===
As of 8 March 2026

Appearances and goals by club, season and competition
| Club | Season | League | | | Cup | | Other | | Total | |
| Club | Season | Division | Apps | Goals | Apps | Goals | Apps | Goals | Apps | Goals |
|---|---|---|---|---|---|---|---|---|---|---|
| Watford | 2020–21 | Championship | 0 | 0 | 0 | 0 | – | | 0 | 0 |
| Watford | 2021–22 | Premier League | 0 | 0 | 0 | 0 | – | | 0 | 0 |
| Watford | Total | | 0 | 0 | 0 | 0 | 0 | 0 | 0 | 0 |
| Charleroi (loan) | 2020–21 | Belgian Pro League | 0 | 0 | 0 | 0 | – | | 0 | 0 |
| SV Horn (loan) | 2021–22 | 2. Liga | 8 | 0 | 0 | 0 | – | | 8 | 0 |
| SV Horn (loan) | 2022–23 | 2. Liga | 1 | 0 | 0 | 0 | – | | 1 | 0 |
| SV Horn (loan) | Total | | 9 | 0 | 0 | 0 | 0 | 0 | 9 | 0 |
| Vyškov | 2022–23 | Czech NFL | 8 | 1 | 0 | 0 | – | | 8 | 1 |
| Vyškov | 2023–24 | Czech NFL | 4 | 1 | 1 (Note: Appearance(s) in Czech Cup) | 0 | – | | 5 | 1 |
| Vyškov | Total | | 12 | 2 | 1 | 0 | 0 | 0 | 13 | 2 |
| Real Kashmir | 2025–26 | Indian Football League | 2 | 0 | 0 | 0 | – | | 2 | 0 |
| Career total | | | 23 | 2 | 1 | 0 | 0 | 0 | 24 | 2 |
