= 2019 U-17 Africa Cup of Nations qualification =

2019 Africa U-17 Cup of Nations qualification
Tournament details
- Host countries: Tunisia (North Zone); Senegal (West A Zone); Niger (West B Zone); Equatorial Guinea (Central Zone); Tanzania (Central-East Zone); Mauritius (South Zone)
- Dates: 19 July – 18 September 2018
- Teams: 49 (from 1 confederation)

Tournament statistics
- Matches played: 78
- Goals scored: 279 (3.58 per match)
- Top scorer: (Ethiopia) Mintesnot Wakjira; (8 goals)

The 2019 Africa U-17 Cup of Nations qualification was a men's under-17 football competition which decided the participating teams of the 2019 Africa U-17 Cup of Nations.

Players born 1 January 2002 or later were eligible to participate in the competition. A total of eight teams qualified to play in the final tournament, including Tanzania who qualified automatically as hosts.

== Teams ==
In July 2017, the Confederation of African Football decided that the qualifying competition should be split into regional competitions. To qualify, 49 of the 54 CAF members entered the qualifying tournament of their zone, including the hosts Tanzania, which also participated in qualification despite automatically qualified for the final tournament.

Apart from the hosts, each of the six zones received one spot in the final tournament, and the zone of the defending champions received an additional spot. Since Mali won the 2017 Africa U-17 Cup of Nations, West A Zone received two spots.

| Zone | Spots | Teams entering qualification | Did not enter |
|---|---|---|---|
| North Zone (UNAF) | 1 spot | Algeria; Libya; **Morocco**; Tunisia **(H)** | Egypt |
| West A Zone (WAFU-UFOA A) | 2 spots | Cape Verde; Gambia; **Guinea**; Guinea-Bissau; Liberia; Mali; Mauritania; **Senegal** **(H)**; Sierra Leone | |
| West B Zone (WAFU-UFOA B) | 1 spot | Benin; Burkina Faso; Ghana; Ivory Coast; Niger **(H)**; **Nigeria**; Togo | |
| Central Zone (UNIFFAC) | 1 spot | **Cameroon**; Central African Republic; Chad; Congo; DR Congo; Equatorial Guinea **(H)**; São Tomé and Príncipe | Gabon (withdrew) |
| Central-East Zone (CECAFA) | 1 spot + hosts | Burundi; Djibouti; Ethiopia; Kenya; Rwanda; Somalia; South Sudan; Sudan; **Tanzania** **(H, Q)**; **Uganda** | Eritrea |
| South Zone (COSAFA) | 1 spot | **Angola**; Botswana; Lesotho; Malawi; Mauritius **(H)**; Mozambique; Namibia; Seychelles; South Africa; Eswatini (formerly Swaziland); Zambia; Zimbabwe | Comoros; Madagascar |

Notes

- Teams in **bold** qualified for the final tournament.
- (H): Qualifying tournament hosts
- (Q): Automatically qualified for final tournament regardless of qualification results

== Format ==
The qualification format is determined by each zone (Regulations Article 13).

- In case any qualification ties are played on a home-and-away two-legged basis: If the aggregate score is tied after the second leg, the away goals rule is applied, and if still tied, the penalty shoot-out (no extra time) is used to determine the winner.
- In case any qualification groups are played on a round-robin basis: Teams are ranked according to points (3 points for a win, 1 point for a draw, 0 points for a loss), and if tied on points, the following tiebreaking criteria are applied, in the order given, to determine the rankings:
1. Points in head-to-head matches among tied teams;
2. Goal difference in head-to-head matches among tied teams;
3. Goals scored in head-to-head matches among tied teams;
4. If more than two teams are tied, and after applying all head-to-head criteria above, a subset of teams are still tied, all head-to-head criteria above are reapplied exclusively to this subset of teams;
5. Goal difference in all group matches;
6. Goals scored in all group matches;
7. Drawing of lots.
- In case any qualification matches are played on a knockout basis: The penalty shoot-out (no extra time) is used to decide the winner if necessary.

== Schedule ==
The schedule of each qualifying zone is as follows.

| Zone | Group stage | Knockout stage |
|---|---|---|
| South Zone | 19–25 July 2018 | 27–29 July 2018 |
| Central Zone | 3–8 August 2018 | 10–12 August 2018 |
| Central-East Zone | 11–22 August 2018 | 24–26 August 2018 |
| North Zone | 20–28 August 2018 | — |
| West B Zone | 2–9 September 2018 | 12–15 September 2018 |
| West A Zone | 9–13 September 2018 | 16–18 September 2018 |

== North Zone ==
Tunisia hosted the 2018 UNAF U-17 Tournament, the 15th edition of the UNAF U-17 Tournament under the auspices of the UNAF, which also served as a qualifiers for the Africa U-17 Cup of Nations, between 20 and 28 August 2018. The matches were played at Monastir (Stade Mustapha Ben Jannet) and Sousse (Stade Olympique de Sousse).

The draw for the fixtures was held on 14 May 2018. The four teams were placed in one group, with the winner qualifying for the final tournament.

All times are local, CET (UTC+1).

| Pos | Team | Pld | W | D | L | GF | GA | GD | Pts | Qualification |
|---|---|---|---|---|---|---|---|---|---|---|
| 1 | Morocco | 3 | 3 | 0 | 0 | 7 | 2 | +5 | 9 | 2019 Africa U-17 Cup of Nations |
| 2 | Algeria | 3 | 1 | 1 | 1 | 5 | 6 | −1 | 4 | |
| 3 | Tunisia (H) | 3 | 1 | 0 | 2 | 1 | 3 | −2 | 3 | |
| 4 | Libya | 3 | 0 | 1 | 2 | 1 | 3 | −2 | 1 | |

Source: CAF
Rules for classification: Group tiebreakers
(H) Hosts
20 August 2018
19:15

| Tunisia | 1–0 | Libya |
|---|---|---|
| Ben Amira 88' (pen.) | Report |

Stade Mustapha Ben Jannet, Monastir
Referee: Samir Guezzaz (Morocco)
20 August 2018
20:15

| Algeria | 2–5 | Morocco |
|---|---|---|
| Belkacem 83'; Benali 85' | Report | Bentayeb 7', 47'; Ouacharaf 27', 39'; Ghailan 80' |

Stade Olympique de Sousse, Sousse
Referee: Ayman Al-Sharif (Libya)

24 August 2018
19:15

| Tunisia | 0–2 | Algeria |
|---|---|---|
| | Report | Rahmoune 56', 78' |

Stade Mustapha Ben Jannet, Monastir
Referee: Ahmed El-Ghandour (Egypt)
24 August 2018
20:15

| Morocco | 1–0 | Libya |
|---|---|---|
| Bentayeb 20' | Report |

Stade Olympique de Sousse, Sousse
Referee: Nabil Boukhalfa (Algeria)

28 August 2018
19:15

| Morocco | 1–0 | Tunisia |
|---|---|---|
| Nakach 21' | Report |

Stade Mustapha Ben Jannet, Monastir
Referee: Amin Mohamed Omar (Egypt)
28 August 2018
19:15

| Libya | 1–1 | Algeria |
|---|---|---|
| Al-Mesrati 33' | Report | Rahmoune 24' |

Stade Olympique de Sousse, Sousse
Referee: Haythem Guirat (Tunisia)

== West A Zone ==
Senegal would host the WAFU-UFOA Zone A U-17 Championship between 9 and 18 September 2018. The matches were played at Pikine (Stade Al Djigo) and Rufisque (Stade Ngalandou Diouf).

All times are local, GMT (UTC±0).

=== Group stage ===
The draw for the group stage was held on 30 July 2018. The nine teams were drawn into three groups of three teams. The winners of each group and the best runners-up advanced to the semi-finals.

==== Group A ====
| Pos | Team | Pld | W | D | L | GF | GA | GD | Pts | Qualification |
|---|---|---|---|---|---|---|---|---|---|---|
| 1 | Senegal (H) | 2 | 2 | 0 | 0 | 5 | 0 | +5 | 6 | Semi-finals |
| 2 | Guinea-Bissau | 2 | 1 | 0 | 1 | 2 | 2 | 0 | 3 | |
| 3 | Sierra Leone | 2 | 0 | 0 | 2 | 1 | 6 | −5 | 0 | |

Source: CAF
Rules for classification: Group tiebreakers
(H) Hosts
9 September 2018
15:30

| Senegal | 1–0 | Guinea-Bissau |
|---|---|---|
| Baldé 17' | Report |

Stade Al Djigo, Pikine
Referee: Bangaly Konaté (Guinea)

11 September 2018
16:30

| Guinea-Bissau | 2–1 | Sierra Leone |
|---|---|---|
| C. Sanha 74'; C. Mendes 79' | Report | Lamin 40' |

Stade Al Djigo, Pikine
Referee: Abdoulaye Rhissa Almoustapha (Niger)

13 September 2018
16:30

| Sierra Leone | 0–4 | Senegal |
|---|---|---|
| | Report | S. Diallo 28'; M. Diaw 45', 56'; Derosime 63' (o.g.) |

Stade Al Djigo, Pikine
Referee: Fabricio Duarte (Cape Verde)

==== Group B ====
| Pos | Team | Pld | W | D | L | GF | GA | GD | Pts | Qualification |
|---|---|---|---|---|---|---|---|---|---|---|
| 1 | Mali | 1 | 1 | 0 | 0 | 2 | 0 | +2 | 3 | Semi-finals |
| 2 | Gambia | 1 | 0 | 0 | 1 | 0 | 2 | −2 | 0 | |
| 3 | Liberia | 0 | 0 | 0 | 0 | 0 | 0 | 0 | 0 | Withdrew |

Source: CAF
Rules for classification: Group tiebreakers
9 September 2018
18:30

| Mali | 2–0 (Note: Gambia had only 1 substitute in their lineup as 7 of their players failed the MRI test. The referee stopped the match at the 62nd minute, the Gambians complaining that the lighting of the stadium was insufficient and had their only goalkeeper injured. The referee finished the match at the 62nd minute as Gambia was unable to continue. Mali qualified for the semi-final and since there were only 2 teams in the group after the withdrawal of Liberia, CAF announced that the team finishing 2nd in Group B was ineligible to be ranked in the table for the best 2nd place team.) | Gambia |
|---|---|---|
| Guindo 8'; Saidy 10' (o.g.) | Report |

Stade Al Djigo, Pikine
Referee: Jean Ouattara (Burkina Faso)

11 September 2018
18:30

| Gambia | Cancelled | Liberia |
|---|---|---|
| | Report |

Stade Al Djigo, Pikine

13 September 2018
18:30

| Liberia | Cancelled | Mali |
|---|---|---|
| | Report |

Stade Al Djigo, Pikine

==== Group C ====
| Pos | Team | Pld | W | D | L | GF | GA | GD | Pts | Qualification |
|---|---|---|---|---|---|---|---|---|---|---|
| 1 | Guinea | 2 | 1 | 1 | 0 | 4 | 2 | +2 | 4 | Semi-finals |
| 2 | Cape Verde | 2 | 1 | 1 | 0 | 3 | 2 | +1 | 4 | Semi-finals |
| 3 | Mauritania | 2 | 0 | 0 | 2 | 2 | 5 | −3 | 0 | |

Source: CAF
Rules for classification: Group tiebreakers
9 September 2018
21:00

| Guinea | 3–1 | Mauritania |
|---|---|---|
| A. Conté 10', 61' (pen.); A. Bangoura 43' | Report | Sy 58' |

Stade Ngalandou Diouf, Rufisque
Referee: Adissa Abdul Raphiou Ligali (Benin)

11 September 2018
18:30 (Note: Kick-off of the match between Mauritania and Cape Verde was moved from 21:00 to 18:30, and the match between Cape Verde and Guinea was moved from 21:00 to 16:30, after the withdrawal of Liberia from Group B.)

| Mauritania | 1–2 | Cape Verde |
|---|---|---|
| Tijani 63' | Report | A. Gomes 54'; P. Gomes 90+1' |

Stade Ngalandou Diouf, Rufisque
Referee: Issa Sy (Senegal)

13 September 2018
16:30

| Cape Verde | 1–1 | Guinea |
|---|---|---|
| Martins 9' (pen.) | Report | Fanyé 32' |

Stade Ngalandou Diouf, Rufisque
Referee: Boubou Traoré (Mali)

=== Ranking of second-placed teams ===
| Pos | Grp | Team | Pld | W | D | L | GF | GA | GD | Pts | Qualification |
|---|---|---|---|---|---|---|---|---|---|---|---|
| 1 | C | Cape Verde | 2 | 1 | 1 | 0 | 3 | 2 | +1 | 4 | Semi-finals |
| 2 | A | Guinea-Bissau | 2 | 1 | 0 | 1 | 2 | 2 | 0 | 3 | |
| 3 | B | Gambia | 1 | 0 | 0 | 1 | 0 | 2 | −2 | 0 | Ineligible |

Source: CAF
Rules for classification: Group tiebreakers

=== Knockout stage ===
Semi-finals
16 September – Rufisque
Senegal | 6
Cape Verde | 0
16 September – Rufisque
Mali | 2 (4)
Guinea (p) | 2 (5)

Final
18 September – Rufisque
Senegal | 4
Guinea | 0

==== Semi-finals ====
Winners qualified for 2019 Africa U-17 Cup of Nations.

16 September 2018
16:30

| Senegal | 6–0 | Cape Verde |
|---|---|---|
| S. Diallo 9', 45'; Baldé 23'; Boye 55'; Diouf 75'; B. Diallo 90' | Report |

Stade Ngalandou Diouf, Rufisque
Referee: Adissa Abdul Raphiou Ligali (Benin)
16 September 2018
19:30

| Mali | 2–2 | Guinea |
|---|---|---|
| Maïga 34'; Diambou 83' | Report | Fanyé 9'; A. Conté 75' |
Penalties
| Guindo (penalty scored); Nene (penalty scored); Sissokho (penalty scored); Bamba (penalty scored); Diallo (penalty missed) | 4–5 | (penalty scored) A. Bangoura; (penalty scored) S. Bangoura; (penalty scored) Diallo; (penalty scored) O. Conté; (penalty scored) A. Conté |

Stade Ngalandou Diouf, Rufisque
Referee: Abdoulaye Rhissa Almoustapha (Niger)

==== Final ====
18 September 2018
16:30

| Senegal | 4–0 | Guinea |
|---|---|---|
| M. Diaw 39'; Diouf 79'; Baldé 86', 88' | Report |

Stade Ngalandou Diouf, Rufisque
Referee: Fabricio Duarte (Cape Verde)

== West B Zone ==
The WAFU-UFOA Zone B qualifiers for the Africa U-17 Cup of Nations were held in Niger between 2 and 15 September 2018. It was originally to be hosted at Ghana, but a new host was appointed. The matches were played at Niamey (Stade Général Seyni Kountché; Stade Municipal would originally also host matches).

All times are local, WAT (UTC+1).

=== Group stage ===
The draw for the group stage was held on 24 July 2018. The seven teams were drawn into two groups, one of three teams and one of four teams. The winners and runners-up of each group advanced to the semi-finals.

==== Group A ====
| Pos | Team | Pld | W | D | L | GF | GA | GD | Pts | Qualification |
|---|---|---|---|---|---|---|---|---|---|---|
| 1 | Ghana | 2 | 1 | 1 | 0 | 2 | 1 | +1 | 4 | Semi-finals |
| 2 | Niger (H) | 2 | 0 | 2 | 0 | 0 | 0 | 0 | 2 | Semi-finals |
| 3 | Togo | 2 | 0 | 1 | 1 | 1 | 2 | −1 | 1 | |

Source: CAF
Rules for classification: Group tiebreakers
(H) Hosts
2 September 2018
16:00

| Niger | 0–0 | Togo |
|---|---|---|
| | Report |

Stade Général Seyni Kountché, Niamey
Referee: Abdullahi Shuaibu (Nigeria)

5 September 2018
16:30

| Niger | 0–0 | Ghana |
|---|---|---|
| | Report |

Stade Général Seyni Kountché, Niamey
Referee: Hassan Corneh (Liberia)

8 September 2018
16:30

| Togo | 1–2 | Ghana |
|---|---|---|
| Dermane 45' | Report | Boateng 43'; Appiah 85' (pen.) |

Stade Général Seyni Kountché, Niamey
Referee: Bienvenu Sinko (Ivory Coast)

==== Group B ====
| Pos | Team | Pld | W | D | L | GF | GA | GD | Pts | Qualification |
|---|---|---|---|---|---|---|---|---|---|---|
| 1 | Nigeria | 2 | 1 | 0 | 1 | 7 | 4 | +3 | 3 | Semi-finals |
| 2 | Ivory Coast | 2 | 1 | 0 | 1 | 4 | 5 | −1 | 3 | Semi-finals |
| 3 | Burkina Faso | 2 | 1 | 0 | 1 | 3 | 5 | −2 | 3 | |
| 4 | Benin (D) | 0 | 0 | 0 | 0 | 0 | 0 | 0 | 0 | Disqualified (Note: On 3 September 2018, Benin were disqualified from the tournament after 10 of their players failed MRI tests prior to the tournament.) |

Source: CAF
Rules for classification: Group tiebreakers
(D) Disqualified
Notes:
3 September 2018
16:30

| Nigeria | 2–3 | Burkina Faso |
|---|---|---|
| Olusegun 12', 45+1' (pen.) | Report | Komi 3' (pen.); Kouame 7'; Compaoré 78' |

Stade Général Seyni Kountché, Niamey
Referee: Mohamed Ali Moussa (Niger)
3 September 2018
19:00

| Ivory Coast | Cancelled | Benin |
|---|---|---|
| | Report |

Stade Général Seyni Kountché, Niamey

6 September 2018
16:30

| Nigeria | 5–1 | Ivory Coast |
|---|---|---|
| Hussain 7'; Olaniyan 10'; Olusegun 23'; Adeniyi 27'; Amoo 58' (pen.) | Report | D'Ávila 70' (pen.) |

Stade Général Seyni Kountché, Niamey
Referee: Kokou N'Tale (Togo)
6 September 2018
19:00

| Burkina Faso | Cancelled | Benin |
|---|---|---|
| | Report |

Stade Général Seyni Kountché, Niamey

9 September 2018
16:00

| Nigeria | Cancelled | Benin |
|---|---|---|
| | Report |

Stade Général Seyni Kountché, Niamey
9 September 2018
16:30

| Burkina Faso | 0–3 | Ivory Coast |
|---|---|---|
| | Report | D'Ávila 33'; Fofana 68' (pen.); Traoré 77' |

Stade Général Seyni Kountché, Niamey (Note: Venue of the match between Burkina Faso and Ivory Coast was moved from Stade Municipal to Stade Général Seyni Kountché after the disqualification of Benin.)
Referee: Beida Dahane (Mauritania)

=== Knockout stage ===
Semi-finals
12 September – Niamey
Ghana | 2
Ivory Coast | 1
12 September – Niamey
Nigeria | 2
Niger | 1

Final
15 September – Niamey
Ghana | 1 (1)
Nigeria (p) | 1 (3)
Third place
15 September – Niamey
Ivory Coast | 0
Niger | 2

==== Semi-finals ====
12 September 2018
16:30

| Ghana | 2–1 | Ivory Coast |
|---|---|---|
| Umar 39'; Shaibu 45' | Report | Traoré 19' |

Stade Général Seyni Kountché, Niamey
Referee: Bonifacio Julio Da Silva (Guinea-Bissau)
12 September 2018
19:30

| Nigeria | 2–1 | Niger |
|---|---|---|
| Amoo 45'; Olusegun 58' | Report | Sidibé 90' |

Stade Général Seyni Kountché, Niamey
Referee: Djindo Louis Houngnandande (Benin)

==== Third place match ====
15 September 2018
16:00

| Ivory Coast | 0–2 | Niger |
|---|---|---|
| | Report | Ali ?', ?' |

Stade Général Seyni Kountché, Niamey
Referee: Hassan Corneh (Liberia)

==== Final ====
Winner qualified for 2019 Africa U-17 Cup of Nations.

15 September 2018
19:00

| Ghana | 1–1 | Nigeria |
|---|---|---|
| Shaibu 54' | Report | Amoo 61' |
Penalties
| Uzair (penalty missed); Adade (penalty scored); Agyapong (penalty missed); Fatawu (penalty missed) | 1–3 | (penalty scored) Ishaya; (penalty scored) Tijani; (penalty missed) Amoo; (penalty scored) Ibrahim |

Stade Général Seyni Kountché, Niamey
Referee: Kokou N'Tale (Togo)

== Central Zone ==
The UNIFFAC qualifiers for the Africa U-17 Cup of Nations were held in Equatorial Guinea between 3 and 12 August 2018. It was originally to be hosted at DR Congo, but a new host was appointed. The matches were played at Bata (Estadio de Bata and Estadio La Libertad) and Malabo (Estadio de Malabo).

All times are local, WAT (UTC+1).

=== Group stage ===
The draw for the group stage was held on 30 July 2018. The seven teams were drawn into two groups, one of four teams and one of three teams. The winners and runners-up of each group advanced to the semi-finals.

==== Group A ====
| Pos | Team | Pld | W | D | L | GF | GA | GD | Pts | Qualification |
|---|---|---|---|---|---|---|---|---|---|---|
| 1 | Congo | 2 | 1 | 1 | 0 | 2 | 0 | +2 | 4 | Semi-finals |
| 2 | Equatorial Guinea (H) | 2 | 1 | 0 | 1 | 2 | 3 | −1 | 3 | Semi-finals |
| 3 | DR Congo | 2 | 0 | 1 | 1 | 1 | 2 | −1 | 1 | |
| 4 | São Tomé and Príncipe (D) | 0 | 0 | 0 | 0 | 0 | 0 | 0 | 0 | Disqualified (Note: On 3 August 2018, São Tomé and Príncipe were disqualified from the tournament after it was found out with the help of the MRI tests that all the players of the team were born in 2001 and would have been overaged in 2019. CAF earlier announced in its regulations that all the players should have been born on or after 1 January 2002.) |

Source: CAF
Rules for classification: Group tiebreakers
(D) Disqualified; (H) Hosts
Notes:
3 August 2018
17:00

| Equatorial Guinea | 2–1 | DR Congo |
|---|---|---|
| Nsue 45' (pen.); Robema 66' | Report | Kimvuidi 30' |

Estadio de Bata, Bata
Referee: Andre Kolissala (Central African Republic)
4 August 2018
16:00

| São Tomé and Príncipe | Cancelled | Congo |
|---|---|---|
| | Report |

Estadio de Bata, Bata

5 August 2018
16:00

| DR Congo | Cancelled | São Tomé and Príncipe |
|---|---|---|
| | Report |

Estadio de Bata, Bata
5 August 2018
16:00 (Note: Kick-off of the match between Equatorial Guinea and Congo was moved from 19:00 to 16:00 after the disqualification of São Tomé and Príncipe.)

| Equatorial Guinea | 0–2 | Congo |
|---|---|---|
| | Report | Kokolo 7' (pen.), 90' |

Estadio de Bata, Bata
Referee: Blaise Yuven Ngwa (Cameroon)

7 August 2018
16:00

| Equatorial Guinea | Cancelled | São Tomé and Príncipe |
|---|---|---|
| | Report |

Estadio de Bata, Bata
7 August 2018
16:00

| Congo | 0–0 | DR Congo |
|---|---|---|
| | Report |

Estadio La Libertad, Bata
Referee: Ahmat Amara Hassane (Chad)

==== Group B ====
| Pos | Team | Pld | W | D | L | GF | GA | GD | Pts | Qualification |
|---|---|---|---|---|---|---|---|---|---|---|
| 1 | Cameroon | 2 | 2 | 0 | 0 | 12 | 4 | +8 | 6 | Semi-finals |
| 2 | Central African Republic | 2 | 1 | 0 | 1 | 4 | 9 | −5 | 3 | Semi-finals |
| 3 | Chad | 2 | 0 | 0 | 2 | 5 | 8 | −3 | 0 | |

Source: CAF
Rules for classification: Group tiebreakers
4 August 2018
16:00

| Cameroon | 7–1 | Central African Republic |
|---|---|---|
| Seidou 3'; Alioum 22', 48'; Mvoué 35' (pen.), 64', 77'; Wamba 42' | Report | Yawenendji 25' |

Estadio de Malabo, Malabo
Referee: Diosdado Nzibi Nze (Equatorial Guinea)

6 August 2018
16:00

| Central African Republic | 3–2 | Chad |
|---|---|---|
| Yawenendji 22', 38'; Tomokoa 81' | Report | Hassan 31'; Djoeta 72' (pen.) |

Estadio de Malabo, Malabo
Referee: Yannick Kabanga Malala (DR Congo)

8 August 2018
16:00

| Cameroon | 5–3 | Chad |
|---|---|---|
| Seidou 1', 9'; Djembe 40', 62', 85' | Report | Souleymane 32'; Abbakali 52'; Djoeta 56' (pen.) |

Estadio de Malabo, Malabo
Referee: Angel Antonio Angue (Equatorial Guinea)

=== Knockout stage ===
Semi-finals
10 August – Bata
Congo | 4
Central African Rep. | 0
10 August – Malabo
Cameroon | 2
Equatorial Guinea | 0

Final
12 August – Malabo
Congo | 1
Cameroon | 3
Third place
12 August – Malabo
Central African Rep. | 1
Equatorial Guinea | 2

==== Semi-finals ====
10 August 2018
16:00

| Congo | 4–0 | Central African Republic |
|---|---|---|
| Matongo 34', 65'; Andzuono 62'; Ayemba 75' | Report |

Estadio de Bata, Bata
Referee: Pierre Atcho (Gabon)
10 August 2018
16:00

| Cameroon | 2–0 | Equatorial Guinea |
|---|---|---|
| Mvoué 7'; Wamba 15' | Report |

Estadio de Malabo, Malabo
Referee: Yannick Kabanga Malala (DR Congo)

==== Third place match ====
12 August 2018
14:00

| Central African Republic | 1–2 | Equatorial Guinea |
|---|---|---|
| Yawenendji 66' | Report | Robema 25'; Nguema 86' |

Estadio de Malabo, Malabo
Referee: Auladyo Dos Santos Pariz (São Tomé and Príncipe)

==== Final ====
Winner qualified for 2019 Africa U-17 Cup of Nations.

12 August 2018
17:00

| Congo | 1–3 | Cameroon |
|---|---|---|
| Kokolo 77' | Report | Ndongo 35'; Alioum 41'; Seidou 79' |

Estadio de Malabo, Malabo
Referee: Andre Kolissala (Central African Republic)

== Central-East Zone ==
The CECAFA qualifiers for the Africa U-17 Cup of Nations were held in Tanzania between 11 and 26 August 2018. The matches were played at Dar es Salaam (National Stadium and Chamazi Stadium).

All times are local, EAT (UTC+3).

=== Group stage ===
The draw for the group stage was held on 5 July 2018. The ten teams were drawn into two groups of five teams. The winners and runners-up of each group advanced to the semi-finals.

==== Group A ====
| Pos | Team | Pld | W | D | L | GF | GA | GD | Pts | Qualification |
|---|---|---|---|---|---|---|---|---|---|---|
| 1 | Tanzania (H) | 3 | 3 | 0 | 0 | 11 | 1 | +10 | 9 | Semi-finals |
| 2 | Rwanda | 3 | 2 | 0 | 1 | 7 | 8 | −1 | 6 | Semi-finals |
| 3 | Burundi | 3 | 1 | 0 | 2 | 8 | 8 | 0 | 3 | |
| 4 | Sudan | 3 | 0 | 0 | 3 | 3 | 12 | −9 | 0 | |
| 5 | Somalia | 0 | 0 | 0 | 0 | 0 | 0 | 0 | 0 | Withdrew |

Source: CAF
Rules for classification: Group tiebreakers
(H) Hosts
11 August 2018
14:00

| Rwanda | 3–1 | Sudan |
|---|---|---|
| Nyarugabo 30'; Isingizwe 33' (pen.); J. Ishimwe 89' | Report | Badr 71' |

National Stadium, Dar es Salaam
Referee: Andrew Juma Otieno (Kenya)
11 August 2018
17:00

| Tanzania | 2–1 | Burundi |
|---|---|---|
| Pius 10'; Ngoda 28' | Report | Arthur 20' |

National Stadium, Dar es Salaam
Referee: Belay Tadesse Asserese (Ethiopia)

13 August 2018
14:00

| Sudan | Cancelled | Somalia |
|---|---|---|
| | Report |

National Stadium, Dar es Salaam
13 August 2018
16:00 (Note: Kick-off of the matches between Burundi and Rwanda, Sudan and Tanzania, and Rwanda and Tanzania, were moved from 17:00 to 16:00, and the match between Burundi and Sudan was moved from 14:00 to 16:00, after the withdrawal of Somalia.)

| Burundi | 3–4 | Rwanda |
|---|---|---|
| Irankunda 26'; Munaba 57'; Iratanga 70' | Report | Nyarugabo 22', 62'; Isingizwe 42'; Nsanzimfura 43' |

National Stadium, Dar es Salaam
Referee: Saddam Houssein (Djibouti)

16 August 2018
14:00

| Somalia | Cancelled | Rwanda |
|---|---|---|
| | Report |

National Stadium, Dar es Salaam
16 August 2018
16:00

| Sudan | 0–5 | Tanzania |
|---|---|---|
| | Report | Yousif 11' (o.g.); Pius 46', 61'; Ngoda 73', 80' |

National Stadium, Dar es Salaam
Referee: William Oloya (Uganda)

18 August 2018
16:00

| Burundi | 4–2 | Sudan |
|---|---|---|
| Irankunda 40'; Arthur 48', 90+3'; Niyera 78' (pen.) | Report | Ali 82'; El Toum 86' |

National Stadium, Dar es Salaam
Referee: Andrew Juma Otieno (Kenya)
18 August 2018
17:00

| Tanzania | Cancelled | Somalia |
|---|---|---|
| | Report |

National Stadium, Dar es Salaam

21 August 2018
14:00

| Somalia | Cancelled | Burundi |
|---|---|---|
| | Report |

National Stadium, Dar es Salaam
21 August 2018
16:00

| Rwanda | 0–4 | Tanzania |
|---|---|---|
| | Report | Pius 23', 83', 90+3'; Ngoda 77' |

National Stadium, Dar es Salaam
Referee: Saddam Houssein (Djibouti)

==== Group B ====
| Pos | Team | Pld | W | D | L | GF | GA | GD | Pts | Qualification |
|---|---|---|---|---|---|---|---|---|---|---|
| 1 | Ethiopia | 4 | 4 | 0 | 0 | 14 | 3 | +11 | 12 | Semi-finals |
| 2 | Uganda | 4 | 3 | 0 | 1 | 17 | 3 | +14 | 9 | Semi-finals |
| 3 | Kenya | 4 | 2 | 0 | 2 | 16 | 7 | +9 | 6 | |
| 4 | South Sudan | 4 | 1 | 0 | 3 | 4 | 16 | −12 | 3 | |
| 5 | Djibouti | 4 | 0 | 0 | 4 | 1 | 23 | −22 | 0 | |

Source: CAF
Rules for classification: Group tiebreakers
12 August 2018
14:00

| South Sudan | 2–1 | Djibouti |
|---|---|---|
| D. Joseph 5'; Charles 26' | Report | R. Ahmed 64' |

Chamazi Stadium, Dar es Salaam
Referee: Emmanuel Mwandembwa (Tanzania)
12 August 2018
17:00

| Uganda | 0–1 | Ethiopia |
|---|---|---|
| | Report | Wakjira 14' |

Chamazi Stadium, Dar es Salaam
Referee: Abdoul Twagiramukiza (Rwanda)

14 August 2018
14:00

| Kenya | 4–0 | South Sudan |
|---|---|---|
| Imbali 12'; Mwendwa 61'; Irungu 76'; Ochieng 90' (pen.) | Report |

Chamazi Stadium, Dar es Salaam
Referee: Georges Gatogato (Burundi)
14 August 2018
17:00

| Djibouti | 0–4 | Ethiopia |
|---|---|---|
| | Report | Bayse 7'; Mune 44'; Beyene 52'; Wakjira 75' (pen.) |

Chamazi Stadium, Dar es Salaam
Referee: Elsiddig Eltreefe (Sudan)

17 August 2018
14:00

| South Sudan | 1–6 | Uganda |
|---|---|---|
| Manase 90' (pen.) | Report | Ssekajja 3', 17', 45', 70'; Kakaire 23', 44' |

Chamazi Stadium, Dar es Salaam
Referee: Georges Gatogato (Burundi)
17 August 2018
17:00

| Djibouti | 0–9 | Kenya |
|---|---|---|
| | Report | Imbali 7', 89'; Musa 37'; Bolo 39', 52', 78'; Ochieng 60'; Mwendwa 62', 71' |

Chamazi Stadium, Dar es Salaam
Referee: Abdoul Twagiramukiza (Rwanda)

19 August 2018
14:00

| Ethiopia | 5–1 | South Sudan |
|---|---|---|
| Wondimagegn 6', 45'; Mengesha 18'; Wakjira 43', 58' | Report | Charles 79' |

Chamazi Stadium, Dar es Salaam
Referee: Emmanuel Mwandembwa (Tanzania)
19 August 2018
17:00

| Kenya | 1–3 | Uganda |
|---|---|---|
| Nyakundi 74' | Report | Yiga 45'; Juma 79' (pen.); Asaba 83' |

Chamazi Stadium, Dar es Salaam
Referee: Elsiddig Eltreefe (Sudan)

22 August 2018
15:00 (Note: Kick-off of the matches between Uganda and Djibouti, was moved from 14:00 to 15:00, and the match between Ethiopia and Kenya was moved from 17:00 to 15:00 and venue moved from Chamazi Stadium to National Stadium, to ensure fairness for the final round of matches.)

| Uganda | 8–0 | Djibouti |
|---|---|---|
| Iddi 9'; Kakaire 17'; Yiga 22', 46', 64'; Juma 34', 73' (pen.); Ssekajja 48' | Report |

Chamazi Stadium, Dar es Salaam
Referee: Georges Gatogato (Burundi)
22 August 2018
15:00

| Ethiopia | 4–2 | Kenya |
|---|---|---|
| Bayse 34', 38', 84'; Wakjira 90' | Report | Omija 22'; Imbali 39' |

National Stadium, Dar es Salaam
Referee: Abdoul Twagiramukiza (Rwanda)

=== Knockout stage ===
Semi-finals
24 August – Dar es Salaam
Tanzania | 1
Uganda | 3
24 August – Dar es Salaam
Ethiopia (p) | 2 (4)
Rwanda | 2 (2)

Final
26 August – Dar es Salaam
Uganda | 3
Ethiopia | 1
Third place
26 August – Dar es Salaam
Tanzania (p) | 2 (4)
Rwanda | 2 (3)

==== Semi-finals ====
24 August 2018
14:00

| Ethiopia | 2–2 | Rwanda |
|---|---|---|
| Wakjira 11', 51' | Report | Nyarugabo 33'; Isingizwe 44' (pen.) |
Penalties
| Bayse (penalty scored); Mengesha (penalty scored); Mune (penalty scored); Wakjira (penalty scored) | 4–2 | (penalty scored) Nsanzimfura; (penalty missed) Nyarugabo; (penalty scored) Niyitanga; (penalty missed) Hagumubuzima |

National Stadium, Dar es Salaam
Referee: Elsiddig Eltreefe (Sudan)
24 August 2018
17:00

| Tanzania | 1–3 | Uganda |
|---|---|---|
| Mshirakandi 11' | Report | Iddi 4'; Alou 77'; Njeru 90+2' (o.g.) |

National Stadium, Dar es Salaam
Referee: Andrew Juma Otieno (Kenya)

==== Third place match ====
26 August 2018
14:00

| Tanzania | 2–2 | Rwanda |
|---|---|---|
| Niyomugisha 40' (o.g.); Abraham 80' (pen.) | Report | Nsanzimfura 77' (pen.); J. Ishimwe 87' |
Penalties
| Salumu (penalty scored); Abraham (penalty scored); Castory (penalty missed); Pius (penalty scored); Hamisi (penalty scored) | 4–3 | (penalty scored) Nsanzimfura; (penalty missed) Isingizwe; (penalty scored) J. Ishimwe; (penalty missed) Kazungu; (penalty scored) Niyonsega |

National Stadium, Dar es Salaam
Referee: William Oloya (Uganda)

==== Final ====
Winner qualified for 2019 Africa U-17 Cup of Nations.

26 August 2018
17:00

| Uganda | 3–1 | Ethiopia |
|---|---|---|
| Kasozi 14'; Iddi 62', 85' | Report | Wakjira 90+2' (pen.) |

National Stadium, Dar es Salaam
Referee: Georges Gatogato (Burundi)

== South Zone ==
COSAFA announced that the COSAFA U-17 Championship hosted by Mauritius between 19 and 29 July 2018 would be the region's qualifying tournament. The matches were played at Port Louis (St. François Xavier Stadium) and Belle Vue Maurel (Anjalay Stadium).

All times are local, MUT (UTC+4).

=== Group stage ===
The draw for the group stage was held on 31 May 2018. The twelve teams were drawn into three groups of four teams. The winners of each group and the best runners-up advanced to the semi-finals.

==== Group A ====
| Pos | Team | Pld | W | D | L | GF | GA | GD | Pts | Qualification |
|---|---|---|---|---|---|---|---|---|---|---|
| 1 | Namibia | 3 | 2 | 0 | 1 | 10 | 4 | +6 | 6 (Note: Head-to-head results: Mauritius 0–1 Botswana, Mauritius 1–0 Namibia, Namibia 2–0 Botswana. Head-to-head standings: Namibia: 3 pts, +1 GD; Mauritius: 3 pts, 0 GD; Botswana: 3 pts, −1 GD) | Semi-finals |
| 2 | Mauritius (H) | 3 | 2 | 0 | 1 | 7 | 2 | +5 | 6 | Semi-finals |
| 3 | Botswana | 3 | 2 | 0 | 1 | 3 | 3 | 0 | 6 | |
| 4 | Seychelles | 3 | 0 | 0 | 3 | 5 | 16 | −11 | 0 | |

Source: CAF
Rules for classification: Group tiebreakers
(H) Hosts
Notes:
19 July 2018
10:00

| Namibia | 8–3 | Seychelles |
|---|---|---|
| George 3', 16', 55'; Kamatuka 18'; Tjiueza 38', 68', 72', 84' (pen.) | Report | Aboudou 7'; Suzette 14'; Pauline 19' |

St. François Xavier Stadium, Port Louis
Referee: Kasokota Kafuli Derrick (Zambia)
19 July 2018
15:30

| Mauritius | 0–1 | Botswana |
|---|---|---|
| | Report | Maphorisa 83' (pen.) |

St. François Xavier Stadium, Port Louis
Referee: Antonio Caluassi Dungula (Angola)

21 July 2018
12:00

| Botswana | 2–1 | Seychelles |
|---|---|---|
| Maphorisa 13' (pen.); Kopelang 38' | Report | Pauline 65' |

St. François Xavier Stadium, Port Louis
Referee: Retselisitsoe David Molise (Lesotho)
21 July 2018
15:00

| Mauritius | 1–0 | Namibia |
|---|---|---|
| Kawoa 69' | Report |

St. François Xavier Stadium, Port Louis
Referee: Ben Amisy Tsimanohitsy Ibrahim (Madagascar)

24 July 2018
12:00

| Namibia | 2–0 | Botswana |
|---|---|---|
| Tjiueza 39'; Tsuseb 59' | Report |

Anjalay Stadium, Belle Vue Maurel
Referee: Antonio Caluassi Dungula (Angola)
24 July 2018
12:00

| Seychelles | 1–6 | Mauritius |
|---|---|---|
| Suzette 53' | Report | Gentil 58'; Aristide 59', 87'; Philibert 69'; Genave 78'; Hoareau 90' (o.g.) |

St. François Xavier Stadium, Port Louis
Referee: Ben Amisy Tsimanohitsy Ibrahim (Madagascar)

==== Group B ====
| Pos | Team | Pld | W | D | L | GF | GA | GD | Pts | Qualification |
|---|---|---|---|---|---|---|---|---|---|---|
| 1 | South Africa | 3 | 2 | 1 | 0 | 6 | 2 | +4 | 7 | Semi-finals |
| 2 | Zambia | 3 | 1 | 1 | 1 | 2 | 2 | 0 | 4 | |
| 3 | Mozambique | 3 | 1 | 1 | 1 | 3 | 5 | −2 | 4 | |
| 4 | Lesotho | 3 | 0 | 1 | 2 | 1 | 3 | −2 | 1 | |

Source: CAF
Rules for classification: Group tiebreakers
19 July 2018
12:30

| Zambia | 0–0 | Mozambique |
|---|---|---|
| | Report |

St. François Xavier Stadium, Port Louis
Referee: Ben Amisy Tsimanohitsy Ibrahim (Madagascar)
20 July 2018
15:30

| Lesotho | 0–0 | South Africa |
|---|---|---|
| | Report |

Anjalay Stadium, Belle Vue Maurel
Referee: Ishmael Chizinga (Malawi)

22 July 2018
12:00

| Mozambique | 1–4 | South Africa |
|---|---|---|
| Pablo 63' | Report | Siyasi 7'; Nare 48'; Buthelezi 75'; Balakasi 86' |

Anjalay Stadium, Belle Vue Maurel
Referee: Kasokota Kafuli Derrick (Zambia)
22 July 2018
15:00

| Zambia | 1–0 | Lesotho |
|---|---|---|
| Kalinda 89' | Report |

Anjalay Stadium, Belle Vue Maurel
Referee: Antonio Caluassi Dungula (Angola)

24 July 2018
15:00

| Lesotho | 1–2 | Mozambique |
|---|---|---|
| Rapuleng 81' | Report | Pablo 2'; José 13' |

Anjalay Stadium, Belle Vue Maurel
Referee: Kasokota Kafuli Derrick (Zambia)
24 July 2018
15:00

| South Africa | 2–1 | Zambia |
|---|---|---|
| Buthelezi 12'; Radiopane 81' | Report | Kalinda 7' |

St. François Xavier Stadium, Port Louis
Referee: Ganesh Chutooree (Mauritius)

==== Group C ====
| Pos | Team | Pld | W | D | L | GF | GA | GD | Pts | Qualification |
|---|---|---|---|---|---|---|---|---|---|---|
| 1 | Angola | 3 | 3 | 0 | 0 | 7 | 1 | +6 | 9 | Semi-finals |
| 2 | Malawi | 3 | 2 | 0 | 1 | 6 | 1 | +5 | 6 | |
| 3 | Eswatini | 3 | 1 | 0 | 2 | 3 | 7 | −4 | 3 | |
| 4 | Zimbabwe | 3 | 0 | 0 | 3 | 3 | 10 | −7 | 0 | |

Source: CAF
Rules for classification: Group tiebreakers
20 July 2018
10:00

| Angola | 1–0 | Malawi |
|---|---|---|
| Netinho 20' | Report |

Anjalay Stadium, Belle Vue Maurel
Referee: Tshepo Mokani Gobagoba (Botswana)
20 July 2018
12:30

| Eswatini | 3–2 | Zimbabwe |
|---|---|---|
| Shabangu 20', 86'; L. Dlamini 26' | Report | Ngwenya 60'; Bonomali 65' |

Anjalay Stadium, Belle Vue Maurel
Referee: Ganesh Chutooree (Mauritius)

23 July 2018
12:00

| Malawi | 5–0 | Zimbabwe |
|---|---|---|
| Mwaungulu 8', 77'; Mbalaka 24'; Mtoso 56'; Mitole 79' | Report |

St. François Xavier Stadium, Port Louis
Referee: Tshepo Mokani Gobagoba (Botswana)
23 July 2018
15:00

| Angola | 4–0 | Eswatini |
|---|---|---|
| Zito 3', 69'; Domingos 63'; Gege 90+1' | Report |

St. François Xavier Stadium, Port Louis
Referee: Ganesh Chutooree (Mauritius)

25 July 2018
15:30

| Eswatini | 0–1 | Malawi |
|---|---|---|
| | Report | Mbeta 28' |

Anjalay Stadium, Belle Vue Maurel
Referee: Retselisitsoe David Molise (Lesotho)
25 July 2018
15:30

| Zimbabwe | 1–2 | Angola |
|---|---|---|
| Mandinyenya 61' | Report | Nzanza 44'; Barri 45' |

St. François Xavier Stadium, Port Louis
Referee: Ben Amisy Tsimanohitsy Ibrahim (Madagascar)

=== Ranking of second-placed teams ===
| Pos | Grp | Team | Pld | W | D | L | GF | GA | GD | Pts | Qualification |
|---|---|---|---|---|---|---|---|---|---|---|---|
| 1 | A | Mauritius | 3 | 2 | 0 | 1 | 7 | 2 | +5 | 6 | Semi-finals |
| 2 | C | Malawi | 3 | 2 | 0 | 1 | 6 | 1 | +5 | 6 | |
| 3 | B | Zambia | 3 | 1 | 1 | 1 | 2 | 2 | 0 | 4 | |

Source: CAF
Rules for classification: Group tiebreakers

=== Knockout stage ===
Semi-finals
27 July – Port Louis
South Africa | 2
Mauritius | 0
27 July – Port Louis
Namibia | 0
Angola | 7

Final
29 July – Port Louis
South Africa | 0
Angola | 1
Third place
29 July – Port Louis
Mauritius | 1
Namibia | 2

==== Semi-finals ====
27 July 2018
12:30

| South Africa | 2–0 | Mauritius |
|---|---|---|
| Nare 27'; Dupre 88' (o.g.) | Report |

St. François Xavier Stadium, Port Louis
Referee: Ishmael Chizinga (Malawi)
27 July 2018
15:30

| Namibia | 0–7 | Angola |
|---|---|---|
| | Report | Capita 46', 67', 69' (pen.); Cisco 71', 87'; Zito 78'; Barri 84' |

St. François Xavier Stadium, Port Louis
Referee: Ben Amisy Tsimanohitsy Ibrahim (Madagascar)

==== Third place match ====
29 July 2018
11:00

| Mauritius | 1–2 | Namibia |
|---|---|---|
| Kawoa 38' | Report | Tjiueza 7'; Kandjii 44' |

St. François Xavier Stadium, Port Louis
Referee: Kasokota Kafuli Derrick (Zambia)

==== Final ====
Winner qualified for 2019 Africa U-17 Cup of Nations.

29 July 2018
15:00

| South Africa | 0–1 | Angola |
|---|---|---|
| | Report | Capita 5' |

St. François Xavier Stadium, Port Louis
Referee: Retselisitsoe David Molise (Lesotho)

== Qualified teams ==
The following eight teams qualify for the final tournament.

| Team | Zone | Qualified on | Previous appearances in Africa U-17 Cup of Nations^{1} only final tournament era (since 1995) |
|---|---|---|---|
| Tanzania (hosts) | Central-East Zone | 26 May 2015 | 1 (2017) |
| Morocco | North Zone | 28 August 2018 | 1 (2013) |
| Senegal | West A Zone | 16 September 2018 | 1 (2011) |
| Guinea | West A Zone | 16 September 2018 | 6 (1995, 1999, 2003, 2009, 2015, 2017) |
| Nigeria | West B Zone | 15 September 2018 | 8 (1995, 1999, **2001**, 2003, 2005, **2007**, 2013, 2015) |
| Cameroon | Central Zone | 12 August 2018 | 6 (1999, 2001, **2003**, 2009, 2015, 2017) |
| Uganda | Central-East Zone | 26 August 2018 | 0 (debut) |
| Angola | South Zone | 29 July 2018 | 3 (1997, 1999, 2017) |

^{1} Bold indicates champions for that year. Italic indicates hosts for that year.

== Goalscorers ==
- North Zone: There were 14 goals scored in 6 matches, for an average of 2.33 goals per match.
- West A Zone: There were 33 goals scored in 10 matches, for an average of 3.3 goals per match.
- West B Zone: There were 27 goals scored in 10 matches, for an average of 2.7 goals per match.
- Central Zone: There were 39 goals scored in 10 matches, for an average of 3.9 goals per match.
- Central-East Zone: There were 97 goals scored in 20 matches, for an average of 4.85 goals per match.
- South Zone: There were 69 goals scored in 22 matches, for an average of 3.14 goals per match.

In total, there were 279 goals scored in 78 matches, for an average of 3.58 goals per match.

8 goals

- (Ethiopia) Mintesnot Wakjira

6 goals

- (Namibia) Prins Tjiueza
- (Tanzania) Kelvin Pius

5 goals

- (Uganda) Davis Ssekajja

4 goals

- (Angola) Capita
- (Cameroon) Stève Mvoué
- (Cameroon) Ismaïla Seidou
- (Central African Republic) Christian Yawenendji
- (Ethiopia) Beyene Bayse
- (Kenya) Keith Imbali
- (Nigeria) Olakunle Olusegun
- (Rwanda) Moise Nyarugabo
- (Senegal) Aliou Baldé
- (Tanzania) Agiri Ngoda
- (Uganda) Abdulwahid Iddi
- (Uganda) Najib Yiga

3 goals

- (Algeria) Riad Rahmoune
- (Angola) Zito
- (Burundi) Nibikora Arthur
- (Cameroon) Nelson Djembe
- (Cameroon) Saidou Alioum
- (Republic of the Congo) Reich Kokolo
- (Guinea) Aboubacar Conté
- (Kenya) Richdonald Bolo
- (Kenya) Mathew Mwendwa
- (Morocco) Tawfik Bentayeb
- (Namibia) Tyrin George
- (Nigeria) Akinkunmi Amoo
- (Rwanda) Rodrigue Isingizwe
- (Senegal) Samba Diallo
- (Senegal) Mouhamadou Diaw
- (Uganda) Ibrahim Juma
- (Uganda) Thomas Kakaire

2 goals

- (Angola) Abdoul Barri
- (Angola) Cisco
- (Botswana) Oageng Maphorisa
- (Burundi) Arsène Irankunda
- (Cameroon) Léonel Wamba
- (Chad) Frédéric Djoeta
- (Republic of the Congo) Valdy Matongo
- (Equatorial Guinea) Francisco Javier Robema
- (Ethiopia) Bunaro Wondimagegn
- (Ghana) Taufiq Shaibu
- (Guinea) Momo Fanyé
- (Ivory Coast) Olivier D'Ávila
- (Ivory Coast) Seydou Traoré
- (Kenya) Nicholas Ochieng
- (Malawi) Patrick Mwaungulu
- (Mauritius) Jean Aristide
- (Mauritius) Jeremy Kawoa
- (Morocco) Bilal Ouacharaf
- (Mozambique) Pablo
- (Niger) Mohamed Sadou Ali
- (Rwanda) Jean-René Ishimwe
- (Rwanda) Keddy Nsanzimfura
- (Senegal) Oumar Diouf
- (Seychelles) Rino Pauline
- (Seychelles) Jarrell Suzette
- (South Africa) Thando Buthelezi
- (South Africa) Motlhalosi Nare
- (South Sudan) Victor Charles
- (Eswatini) Bandile Shabangu
- (Zambia) Vincent Kalinda

1 goal

- (Algeria) Adel Belkacem
- (Algeria) Nabil Benali
- (Angola) Domingos
- (Angola) Gege
- (Angola) Netinho
- (Angola) David Nzanza
- (Botswana) Tebogo Kopelang
- (Burkina Faso) Moubarak Compaoré
- (Burkina Faso) Abdoul Komi
- (Burkina Faso) Jean Fiacre Kouame
- (Burundi) Flavier Iratanga
- (Burundi) Edson Munaba
- (Burundi) Japhet Niyera
- (Cameroon) Nassourou Ndongo
- (Cape Verde) Anderson Freitas Gomes
- (Cape Verde) Paulo Jorge Gomes
- (Cape Verde) Joel Martins
- (Central African Republic) Dazourou Tomokoa
- (Chad) Abakar Abbakali
- (Chad) Mahamat Hassan
- (Chad) Mahamat Souleymane
- (Republic of the Congo) Élie Andzuono
- (Republic of the Congo) Lucien Ayemba
- (Democratic Republic of the Congo) Karim Kimvuidi
- (Djibouti) Remi Ahmed
- (Equatorial Guinea) José Pelayo Nguema
- (Equatorial Guinea) Carmelo Nsue
- (Ethiopia) Biniyam Beyene
- (Ethiopia) Amanuel Mengesha
- (Ethiopia) Bereket Mune
- (Ghana) Simon Appiah
- (Ghana) Christian Boateng
- (Ghana) Mohammed Umar
- (Guinea) Alya Bangoura
- (Guinea-Bissau) Claudio Mendes
- (Guinea-Bissau) Cristiano Sanha
- (Ivory Coast) Ibrahim Fofana
- (Kenya) Telvin Irungu
- (Kenya) Saidi Musa
- (Kenya) Ezekiel Nyakundi
- (Kenya) Alphonce Omija
- (Lesotho) Kananelo Rapuleng
- (Libya) Ibrahim Al-Mesrati
- (Malawi) Tatenda Mbalaka
- (Malawi) Lovemore Mbeta
- (Malawi) Emmanuel Mitole
- (Malawi) Francis Mtoso
- (Mali) Mamady Diambou
- (Mali) Daouda Guindo
- (Mali) Issoufi Maïga
- (Mauritania) Elv Housseine Sy
- (Mauritania) Mohamed Tijani
- (Mauritius) Ian Genave
- (Mauritius) Jean Gentil
- (Mauritius) Louis Philibert
- (Morocco) Zakaria Ghailan
- (Morocco) Akram Nakach
- (Mozambique) José
- (Namibia) Edmar Kamatuka
- (Namibia) Penouua Kandjii
- (Namibia) Gonzales Tsuseb
- (Niger) Sountalma Sidibé
- (Nigeria) Oluwatimilehin Adeniyi
- (Nigeria) Hassan Hussain
- (Nigeria) Olatomi Olaniyan
- (Senegal) Insa Boye
- (Senegal) Boubacar Diédhiou Diallo
- (Seychelles) Afandi Aboudou
- (Sierra Leone) Mohamadu Lamin
- (South Africa) Mthokozisi Balakasi
- (South Africa) Boitumelo Radiopane
- (South Africa) Bongolwetu Siyasi
- (South Sudan) Deng Joseph
- (South Sudan) Joseph Manase
- (Sudan) Agib Ali
- (Sudan) Mohamed Badr
- (Sudan) Anas El Toum
- (Eswatini) Langelihle Dlamini
- (Tanzania) Morice Abraham
- (Tanzania) Edson Mshirakandi
- (Togo) Karim Dermane
- (Tunisia) Mahdi Ben Amira
- (Uganda) John Alou
- (Uganda) Ivan Asaba
- (Uganda) Samson Kasozi
- (Zimbabwe) John Bonomali
- (Zimbabwe) Tapiwa Mandinyenya
- (Zimbabwe) Thandolwenkosi Ngwenya

1 own goal

- (The Gambia) Ansu Saidy (against Mali)
- (Mauritius) Yoan Dupre (against South Africa)
- (Rwanda) Eni Niyomugisha (against Tanzania)
- (Seychelles) Adrian Hoareau (against Mauritius)
- (Sierra Leone) Ibrahim Derosime (against Senegal)
- (Sudan) Omer Yousif (against Tanzania)
- (Tanzania) Amiri Njeru (against Uganda)
