= 2019 U-17 Africa Cup of Nations squads =

The 2019 Africa U-17 Cup of Nations is an international age-restricted football tournament which is currently being held in Tanzania from 14–28 April. The 8 representative teams involved in the tournament were required to register a squad of 21 players, including three goalkeepers. Only players born or after 1 January 2002 are eligible to be registered in these squads, only players registered in the squads are eligible to take part in the tournament.

Players in boldface have been capped at full international level at some point in their career.

== Group A ==
=== Tanzania ===
Head coach: Oscar Mirambo

No.	Pos.	Player	Date of birth (age)	Club
1	GK	Shabani Kingwaga	24 December 2003 (aged 15)	(Tanzania Football Federation) Alliance Schools FC
2	DF	Omary Jumanne	10 June 2002 (aged 16)	(Tanzania Football Federation) Karume Academy
3	DF	Arafat Hussein	13 July 2003 (aged 15)	(Tanzania Football Federation) Karume Academy
4	DF	Ben Swakali	23 July 2002 (aged 16)	(Tanzania Football Federation) Rugby Sports Academy
5	MF	Mustapha Nankuku	5 February 2002 (aged 17)	(Tanzania Football Federation) Tanzania
6	DF	Alphonce Mabula	14 June 2003 (aged 15)	(Tanzania Football Federation) Tanzania
7	MF	Misungwi Boniphace	12 March 2003 (aged 16)	(Tanzania Football Federation) Karume Academy
8	FW	Salumu Milenge	3 August 2003 (aged 15)	(Tanzania Football Federation) Tanzania
9	FW	Edmund Godfrey	4 December 2002 (aged 16)	(Tanzania Football Federation) Alliance Schools FC
10	FW	**Kelvin Pius**	10 June 2003 (aged 15)	(Tanzania Football Federation) Tanzania
12	DF	Pascal Gaudence	15 August 2003 (aged 15)	(Tanzania Football Federation) Tanzania
13	MF	Ladaki Juma	15 March 2004 (aged 15)	(Tanzania Football Federation) Tanzania
14	MF	Dominic Pauline	28 December 2003 (aged 15)	(Tanzania Football Federation) Alliance Schools FC
15	DF	Ally Hamisi	8 November 2002 (aged 16)	(Tanzania Football Federation) Tanzania
16	DF	Amiri Njeru	20 February 2002 (aged 17)	(Tanzania Football Federation) Azam
17	MF	Edson Mshirakandi	28 January 2003 (aged 16)	(Tanzania Football Federation) Tanzania
18	MF	Morice Abraham	13 August 2003 (aged 15)	(Tanzania Football Federation) Tanzania
19	FW	Agiri Ngoda	14 March 2002 (aged 17)	(Tanzania Football Federation) Tanzania
20	GK	Mwinyi Yahya	28 November 2002 (aged 16)	(Tanzania Football Federation) Fair Play

=== Nigeria ===
Head coach: Manu Garba

No.	Pos.	Player	Date of birth (age)	Club
1	GK	Sunday Stephen	20 September 2002 (aged 16)	(Nigeria Football Federation) Abuja
2	DF	Shedrack Tanko	23 June 2003 (aged 15)	(Nigeria Football Federation) Ambassadors FC
3	MF	Ogaga Oduko	11 August 2002 (aged 16)	(Nigeria Football Federation) Fresh Talent FC
4	MF	Samson Tijani	17 May 2002 (aged 16)	(Nigeria Football Federation) NON
5	DF	Clement Ikenna	16 March 2003 (aged 16)	(Nigeria Football Federation) A & B Academy
6	DF	David Ishaya	10 October 2002 (aged 16)	(Nigeria Football Federation) Abuja
7	FW	Olakunle Olusegun	23 April 2002 (aged 16)	(Nigeria Football Federation) ABS
8	FW	Mayowa Abayomi	24 August 2002 (aged 16)	(Nigeria Football Federation) Oasis FC
9	FW	Wisdom Ubani	16 May 2003 (aged 15)	(Nigeria Football Federation) Giant Brillers
10	FW	Adrian Akande	22 October 2003 (aged 15)	(The Football Association) Chelsea
11	MF	Mubaraq Adeshina	30 January 2002 (aged 17)	(Nigeria Football Federation) ABS
12	MF	Shuaibo Abdulrazaq	10 November 2003 (aged 15)	(Nigeria Football Federation) Oma FC
13	MF	Akinkunmi Amoo	7 June 2002 (aged 16)	(Nigeria Football Federation) Sidos FC
14	MF	Olatomi Olaniyan	5 February 2002 (aged 17)	(Nigeria Football Federation) NON
15	DF	Charles Etim	10 October 2003 (aged 15)	(Nigeria Football Federation) Blessed Stars
16	GK	Suleman Shaibu	28 November 2002 (aged 16)	(Nigeria Football Federation) Hofafa FC
17	MF	Peter Agba	20 December 2002 (aged 16)	(Nigeria Football Federation) Falala Football Academy
18	FW	Divine Nwachukwu	25 May 2003 (aged 15)	(Nigeria Football Federation) Rivertime FC
19	FW	Ibraheem Jabaar	24 October 2002 (aged 16)	(Nigeria Football Federation) Olisa FC
20	MF	Fawaz Abdullahi	4 May 2003 (aged 15)	(Nigeria Football Federation) B Angels
21	GK	Joseph Oluwabusola	1 January 2003 (aged 16)	(The Football Association) A.F.C. Bournemouth

=== Angola ===
Head coach: (Portugal) Pedro Gonçalves

No.	Pos.	Player	Date of birth (age)	Club
1	GK	Edmilson Cambila	16 May 2002 (aged 16)	(Angolan Football Federation) A.F.A.
2	DF	Porfírio Abrantes	9 April 2002 (aged 17)	(Angolan Football Federation) A.F.A.
3	DF	António José	5 April 2004 (aged 15)	(Angolan Football Federation) A.F.A.
4	DF	Domingos Andrade	7 May 2003 (aged 15)	(Angolan Football Federation) Interclube
5	DF	Mimo	13 March 2002 (aged 17)	(Angolan Football Federation) A.F.A.
6	MF	Maestro	4 August 2003 (aged 15)	(Angolan Football Federation) A.F.A.
7	MF	**Capita**	10 January 2002 (aged 17)	(Angolan Football Federation) Marinha
8	MF	Manuel Miguel	8 July 2002 (aged 16)	(Angolan Football Federation) Petro Atlético
9	FW	Cláudio Francisco	17 May 2003 (aged 15)	(South African Football Association) Kaizer Chiefs
10	FW	**Zito Luvumbo**	9 March 2002 (aged 17)	(Angolan Football Federation) 1º de Agosto
11	FW	Abdoul Barri	7 January 2002 (aged 17)	(Angolan Football Federation) Interclube
12	GK	Geovani de Carvalho	22 June 2002 (aged 16)	(Angolan Football Federation) 1º de Agosto
13	FW	Agostinho Pedro	21 July 2003 (aged 15)	(Angolan Football Federation) Real Sambila
14	FW	David Nzanza	28 September 2003 (aged 15)	(Angolan Football Federation) Interclube
15	DF	Afonso Binga	23 April 2002 (aged 16)	(Angolan Football Federation) Marinha
16	MF	**Benedito Mukendi**	21 May 2002 (aged 16)	(Angolan Football Federation) Petro Atlético
17	MF	Netinho	18 July 2002 (aged 16)	(Angolan Football Federation) A.F.A.
18	DF	Pablo	14 November 2003 (aged 15)	(Angolan Football Federation) 1º de Agosto
19	DF	Gegé	17 September 2002 (aged 16)	(Angolan Football Federation) Petro Atlético
20	FW	Cisco	1 April 2003 (aged 16)	(Angolan Football Federation) 1º de Agosto
21	GK	Vicente Pedro	14 October 2003 (aged 15)	(Angolan Football Federation) Petro Atlético

=== Uganda ===
Head coach: (Ghana) Samuel Fabin

No.	Pos.	Player	Date of birth (age)	Club
1	GK	Patrick Mubiru	9 April 2003 (aged 16)	(Federation of Uganda Football Associations) Bright Stars FC
2	DF	Kevin Ssekimbegga	4 February 2002 (aged 17)	(Federation of Uganda Football Associations) Express FC
3	DF	Innocent Opira	18 October 2003 (aged 15)	(Federation of Uganda Football Associations) Ndejje University FC
4	DF	Samson Kasozi	10 October 2003 (aged 15)	(Federation of Uganda Football Associations) Bright Stars FC
5	DF	Gavin Kizito	14 January 2002 (aged 17)	(Federation of Uganda Football Associations) Vipers SC
6	MF	Davis Ssekajja	25 February 2002 (aged 17)	(Federation of Uganda Football Associations) Bright Stars FC
7	FW	**Isma Mugulusi**	10 October 2003 (aged 15)	(Federation of Uganda Football Associations) Kirinya–Jinja
8	MF	Andrew Kawooya	3 March 2003 (aged 16)	(Federation of Uganda Football Associations) Vipers SC
9	FW	Abdulwahid Iddi	14 December 2003 (aged 15)	(Federation of Uganda Football Associations) Onduparaka FC
10	MF	Thomas Kakaire	28 December 2003 (aged 15)	(Federation of Uganda Football Associations) Bright Stars FC
11	MF	Ivan Asaba	8 May 2003 (aged 15)	(Federation of Uganda Football Associations) Vipers SC
12	MF	Mukisa Opaala	10 January 2004 (aged 15)	(Federation of Uganda Football Associations) Kirinya–Jinja
13	MF	Polycarp Mwaka	31 December 2002 (aged 16)	(Federation of Uganda Football Associations) Ndejje University FC
14	FW	Najib Yiga	18 December 2002 (aged 16)	(Federation of Uganda Football Associations) Vipers SC
15	FW	Rogers Mugisha	6 June 2003 (aged 15)	(Federation of Uganda Football Associations) Mbarara City FC
16	MF	John Alou	21 July 2002 (aged 16)	(Federation of Uganda Football Associations) Uganda Revenue Authority SC
17	DF	Ibrahim Juma	6 May 2004 (aged 14)	(Federation of Uganda Football Associations) KCCA
18	GK	Jack Komakech	31 July 2002 (aged 16)	(Federation of Uganda Football Associations) Ndejje University FC
19	GK	Oyo Delton	24 November 2003 (aged 15)	(Federation of Uganda Football Associations) Kirinya–Jinja
20	DF	Justine Opiro	28 December 2003 (aged 15)	(Federation of Uganda Football Associations) KCCA
21	FW	James Jarieko	3 November 2003 (aged 15)	(Federation of Uganda Football Associations) Paidha Black Angels FC

== Group B ==
=== Guinea ===
Head coach: Mohamed Maleah Camara

No.	Pos.	Player	Date of birth (age)	Club
1	GK	Mohamed Damaro	1 June 2002 (aged 16)	(Guinean Football Federation) Espérance
2	DF	Alpha Diallo	12 January 2002 (aged 17)	(Guinean Football Federation) Académie Daye
3	FW	Mohamed Lamine	7 July 2002 (aged 16)	(Guinean Football Federation) Sonny Sport
4	MF	Mory Camara	5 February 2003 (aged 16)	(Guinean Football Federation) ASSEG FC
5	DF	Alya Bangoura	26 February 2002 (aged 17)	(Guinean Football Federation) Académie
6	DF	Mahmoud Ben Bangoura	10 January 2002 (aged 17)	(Guinean Football Federation) AS Dakonta
7	FW	Alya Touré	4 January 2002 (aged 17)	(Guinean Football Federation) Académie Séquence
8	MF	Ibrahima Breze	15 August 2002 (aged 16)	(Guinean Football Federation) FC Atouga
9	FW	Momo Fanyé Touré	12 January 2002 (aged 17)	(Guinean Football Federation) Renaissance
10	FW	Algassime Bah	12 November 2002 (aged 16)	(Guinean Football Federation) Renaissance
11	MF	Aboubacar Conté	13 November 2002 (aged 16)	(Guinean Football Federation) CEFOMIG
12	MF	Ousmane Osky	14 February 2002 (aged 17)	(Guinean Football Federation) Horoya AC
13	DF	Naby Oularé	6 August 2002 (aged 16)	(Guinean Football Federation) Santoba FC
14	DF	Ibrahima Kalil	27 August 2002 (aged 16)	(Guinean Football Federation) Athlético
15	MF	Ahmed Keita	31 December 2002 (aged 16)	(Guinean Football Federation) FC Atouga
16	GK	Sékou Camara	25 May 2002 (aged 16)	(Guinean Football Federation) Renaissance
17	DF	Aboubacar Sidiki	6 January 2002 (aged 17)	(Guinean Football Federation) AS Lambandji
18	MF	**Sekou Tidiany Bangoura**	5 April 2002 (aged 17)	(Guinean Football Federation) Atlantic
20	MF	Mohamed Sacko	15 October 2003 (aged 15)	(Guinean Football Federation) ODAS FC
21	GK	N'Faly Camara	23 June 2003 (aged 15)	(Guinean Football Federation) Horoya AC

=== Cameroon ===
Head coach: Thomas Libiih

No.	Pos.	Player	Date of birth (age)	Club
1	GK	Jacques Mbeubap	19 October 2002 (aged 16)	(Cameroonian Football Federation) École
3	DF	Ricky Ngatchou	5 January 2002 (aged 17)	(Cameroonian Football Federation) AS Fortuna
4	MF	Daouda Amadou	2 October 2002 (aged 16)	(Cameroonian Football Federation) Oyili FC
5	DF	Bere Benjamin	9 March 2002 (aged 17)	(Cameroonian Football Federation) Oyili FC
6	MF	Gael Dibongue	5 January 2003 (aged 16)	(Cameroonian Football Federation) AS International
7	FW	Saidou Alioum	25 July 2003 (aged 15)	(Cameroonian Football Federation) Sahel FC
8	MF	Loïc Etoga	1 April 2003 (aged 16)	(Cameroonian Football Federation) AS International
9	FW	Léonel Wamba	1 September 2002 (aged 16)	(Cameroonian Football Federation) Aigle Royal Menoua
10	FW	**Stève Mvoué**	2 February 2002 (aged 17)	(Cameroonian Football Federation) AS Azur Star
11	FW	Yanick Noah	15 June 2002 (aged 16)	(Cameroonian Football Federation) Sahel FC
12	DF	Toni Nang	4 August 2002 (aged 16)	(Cameroonian Football Federation) AS Ngueng
13	DF	Severin Ze Essono	21 July 2003 (aged 15)	(Cameroonian Football Federation) AS International
14	MF	Nassourou Ndongo	20 July 2002 (aged 16)	(Cameroonian Football Federation) AS Dauphine
15	MF	Fabrice Ndzie	27 December 2002 (aged 16)	(Cameroonian Football Federation) Mbankomo Centre of Excellence
16	GK	Manfred Ekoi	9 March 2002 (aged 17)	(Cameroonian Football Federation) Best Stars
17	FW	Nelson Djembe	11 March 2002 (aged 17)	(Cameroonian Football Federation) École
18	DF	Patrice Ngolna	25 August 2002 (aged 16)	(Cameroonian Football Federation) AS Milet
19	FW	Ismaïla Seidou	15 May 2002 (aged 16)	(Cameroonian Football Federation) AS International

=== Morocco ===
Head coach: Jamal Sellami

No.	Pos.	Player	Date of birth (age)	Club
1	GK	Taha Mourid	4 March 2002 (aged 17)	(Royal Moroccan Football Federation) Wydad AC
2	DF	Jihad Moussalli	24 July 2002 (aged 16)	(Royal Moroccan Football Federation) Fath Union Sport
3	DF	Anas Nanah	12 March 2003 (aged 16)	(Royal Moroccan Football Federation) Mohammed VI Football Academy
4	MF	Akram Nakach	7 April 2002 (aged 17)	(Royal Moroccan Football Federation) Mohammed VI Football Academy
5	DF	Oussama Raoui	13 November 2002 (aged 16)	(Royal Moroccan Football Federation) Fath Union Sport
6	MF	Oussama Targhalline	20 May 2002 (aged 16)	(Royal Moroccan Football Federation) Mohammed VI Football Academy
7	MF	Oussama Zemraoui	1 March 2002 (aged 17)	(Royal Moroccan Football Federation) Raja Casablanca
8	MF	Mohammed Essahel	17 February 2003 (aged 16)	(Royal Moroccan Football Federation) Mohammed VI Football Academy
9	FW	Bilal Ouacharaf	9 May 2002 (aged 16)	(Royal Spanish Football Federation) Málaga CF
10	MF	Haitam Abaida	1 June 2002 (aged 16)	(Royal Spanish Football Federation) Málaga CF
11	FW	Tawfik Bentayeb	14 January 2002 (aged 17)	(Royal Moroccan Football Federation) Mohammed VI Football Academy
12	GK	Alaa Bellaarouch	1 January 2002 (aged 17)	(Royal Moroccan Football Federation) Mohammed VI Football Academy
13	GK	Mohamed Asmama	8 February 2002 (aged 17)	(Royal Moroccan Football Federation) Mohammed VI Football Academy
14	DF	Achraf Ramzi	4 February 2002 (aged 17)	(Royal Moroccan Football Federation) Fath Union Sport
15	DF	Youssef Aoujdal	2 January 2002 (aged 17)	(Royal Moroccan Football Federation) Mohammed VI Football Academy
16	MF	Yassine Kechta	25 February 2002 (aged 17)	(French Football Federation) Le Havre AC
17	FW	Faissal Boujemaoui	2 October 2002 (aged 16)	(Royal Belgian Football Association) Genk
18	DF	Mohamed Lakbi	21 February 2002 (aged 17)	(French Football Federation) Troyes AC
19	DF	Saad Bahir	22 January 2002 (aged 17)	(French Football Federation) US Orléans
20	FW	Oussama Ait El Asri	10 January 2002 (aged 17)	(Royal Moroccan Football Federation) Fath Union Sport
21	FW	El Mehdi Maouhoub	5 June 2003 (aged 15)	(Royal Moroccan Football Federation) Fath Union Sport

=== Senegal ===
Head coach: Malick Daf

No.	Pos.	Player	Date of birth (age)	Club
1	GK	Ousmane Ba	6 June 2002 (aged 16)	(Senegalese Football Federation) Génération Foot
2	DF	Thibaut Aubertin	5 May 2002 (aged 16)	(Senegalese Football Federation) Génération Foot
3	DF	Cheikh Diouf	2 February 2002 (aged 17)	(Senegalese Football Federation) Diambars FC
4	DF	Bacary Sane	24 December 2002 (aged 16)	(Senegalese Football Federation) Diambars FC
5	DF	Cheikhou Ndiaye	25 January 2002 (aged 17)	(Senegalese Football Federation) Génération Foot
6	MF	Amete Faye	17 June 2002 (aged 16)	(Senegalese Football Federation) Diambars FC
7	FW	Aliou Balde	12 December 2002 (aged 16)	(Senegalese Football Federation) Diambars FC
8	MF	Boubacar Diallo	15 May 2002 (aged 16)	(Senegalese Football Federation) Diambars FC
9	FW	Souleymane Faye	8 February 2003 (aged 16)	(Senegalese Football Federation) Galaxy FA
10	FW	Mouhamadou Diaw	8 March 2002 (aged 17)	(Senegalese Football Federation) Diambars FC
11	FW	Samba Diallo	5 January 2003 (aged 16)	(Senegalese Football Federation) Académie Foot
12	DF	Birame Diaw	1 May 2003 (aged 15)	(Senegalese Football Federation) Galaxy FA
13	MF	Issaga Kane	11 May 2003 (aged 15)	(Senegalese Football Federation) Galaxy FA
14	MF	Ibrahima Cissoko	18 April 2003 (aged 15)	(Senegalese Football Federation) US Gorée
15	DF	Miyail Faye	14 July 2004 (aged 14)	(Senegalese Football Federation) Diambars FC
16	MF	El Hadji Gueye	20 October 2003 (aged 15)	(Senegalese Football Federation) AS Dakar Sacré-Cœur
17	FW	Mélèye Diagne	24 November 2002 (aged 16)	(Senegalese Football Federation) Diambars FC
18	MF	Pape Matar Sarr	14 September 2002 (aged 16)	(Senegalese Football Federation) Génération Foot
19	MF	Insa Boye	23 March 2002 (aged 17)	(Senegalese Football Federation) Diambars FC
20	FW	Ousmane Diallo Toure	18 September 2003 (aged 15)	(Senegalese Football Federation) NSFC Iyane
21	GK	Pape Dione	20 March 2004 (aged 15)	(Senegalese Football Federation) Académie Foot
