= 2019 U-17 Africa Cup of Nations =

13th edition of U-17 AFCON

2019 Africa U-17 Cup of Nations
2019 Afrika U-17 Kombe la Mataifa

Tournament details
- Host country: Tanzania
- Dates: 14–28 April
- Teams: 8 (from 1 confederation)
- Venue: 2 (in 2 host cities)

Final positions
- Champions: Cameroon (2nd title)
- Runners-up: Vacant (originally Guinea)
- Third place: Angola
- Fourth place: Nigeria

Tournament statistics
- Matches played: 16
- Goals scored: 36 (2.25 per match)
- Top scorer: (Angola) Capita (4 goals)
- Best player: (Cameroon) Stève Mvoué
- Fair play award: Angola

The 2019 Africa U-17 Cup of Nations was the 13th edition of the Africa U-17 Cup of Nations (18th edition if tournaments without hosts are included), the biennial international youth football tournament organized by the Confederation of African Football (CAF) for players aged 17 and below. In May 2015, it was decided that the tournament would be hosted by Tanzania.

Four teams of the tournament qualified for the 2019 FIFA U-17 World Cup in Brazil as the CAF representatives. Cameroon won their second title.

Angola and Nigeria qualified for finishing third and fourth in the competition respectively. Defending champions Mali failed to qualify.

Following completion of the tournament, CAF ejected Guinea from the competition, and deleted its results from the records, for fielding players with passports which had a different date of birth to those the players had used in the U-16 age restricted 'International Dream Cup' in Japan. Senegal were given the remaining place at the U-17 World Cup as they had placed behind Guinea during the group stage.

== Qualification ==
The CAF decided in July 2017 that the format of the qualifying competition should be changed and split according to zones. The qualifiers were played between 19 July and 18 September 2018. At the end of the qualification phase, seven teams joined the hosts Tanzania.

=== Player eligibility ===
Players born 1 January 2002 or later were eligible to participate in the competition.

=== Qualified teams ===
The following eights teams qualified for the final tournament.

Note: All appearance statistics count only those since the introduction of final tournament in 1995.

Team	Zone	Appearance	Previous best performance
Tanzania (hosts)	Central-East Zone	2nd	Group stage (2017)
Morocco	North Zone	2nd	Fourth place (2013)
Senegal	West A Zone	2nd	Group stage (2011)
Guinea	West A Zone	7th	Third place (1995, 2015, 2017)
Nigeria	West B Zone	9th	Champions (2001, 2007)
Cameroon	Central Zone	7th	Champions (2003)
Uganda	Central-East Zone	1st	Debut
Angola	South Zone	4th	Group stage (1997, 1999, 2017)

== Venues ==
The matches were played in two venues.

Cities	Venues	Capacity
Dar es Salaam	National Stadium	60,000
Mbagala, Dar es Salaam	Chamazi Stadium	10,000

== Squads ==
Each squad can contain a maximum of 21 players.

== Draw ==
The draw of the final tournament was held on 20 December 2018, 19:30 EAT (UTC+3), at the Mlimani City Conference Centre in Dar es Salaam. The eight teams were drawn into two groups of four teams. The hosts Tanzania were seeded in Group A and allocated to position A1, while 2017 third place Guinea were seeded in Group B and allocated to position B1 (2017 champions and runners-up Mali and Ghana did not qualify). The remaining six teams were seeded based on their results in the 2017 Africa U-17 Cup of Nations (final tournament and qualifiers), and drawn to any of the remaining three positions in each group.

Seeds	Pot 1	Pot 2
Tanzania (hosts); Guinea (2017 third place)	Cameroon; Angola	Morocco; Nigeria; Senegal; Uganda

== Match officials ==
A total of 13 referees and 14 assistant referees were appointed for the tournament, including one female referee and two female assistant referees, which is the first time women officials were appointed in a CAF men's tournament.

Referees

- Nabil Boukhalfa (Algeria)
- Issa Sy (Senegal)
- Tsegay Mogos Teklu (Eritrea)
- Abdoul Karim Twagiramukiza (Rwanda)
- Ahmed Mahrous Hassan El Ghandour (Egypt)
- Samir Guezzaz (Morocco)
- Dahane Beida (Mauritania)
- Mashood Ssali (Uganda)
- Pierre Atcho (Gabon)
- Blaise Yuven Ngwa (Cameroon)
- Abdulwahid Huraywidah (Libya)
- Andofetra Rakotojaona (Madagascar)
- Jonesia Rukyaa Kabakama (Tanzania)

Assistant Referees

- Eric Ayimavo (Benin)
- (Burkina Faso) Habib Judicael Sanou (Burkina Faso)
- Adam Brahim Ahmat (Chad)
- Salah Abdi Mohamed (Djibouti)
- Nouha Bangoura (Senegal)
- Youssef El-Bosaty (Egypt)
- Mrs Mary Njoroge (Kenya)
- Mrs Lidwine Rakotozafinoro (Madagascar)
- (São Tomé and Príncipe) Abelmiro Dos Reis Montenegro (São Tomé and Príncipe)
- James Emile (Seychelles)
- Omer Hamid Ahmed (Sudan)
- Mohamed Mkono (Tanzania)
- Khalil Hassani (Tunisia)
- Thomas Kusosa (Zimbabwe)

== Group stage ==
The top two teams of each group advance to the semi-finals and qualify for the 2019 FIFA U-17 World Cup.

Tiebreakers

Teams were ranked according to points (3 points for a win, 1 point for a draw, 0 points for a loss), and if tied on points, the following tiebreaking criteria were applied, in the order given, to determine the rankings (Regulations Article 72):

1. Points in head-to-head matches among tied teams;
2. Goal difference in head-to-head matches among tied teams;
3. Goals scored in head-to-head matches among tied teams;
4. If more than two teams are tied, and after applying all head-to-head criteria above, a subset of teams are still tied, all head-to-head criteria above are reapplied exclusively to this subset of teams;
5. Goal difference in all group matches;
6. Goals scored in all group matches;
7. Drawing of lots.

All times are local, EAT (UTC+3).

=== Group A ===
Pos	Team	Pld	W	D	L	GF	GA	GD	Pts	Qualification
1	Nigeria	3	2	1	0	7	5	+2	7	Knockout stage and 2019 FIFA U-17 World Cup
2	Angola	3	2	0	1	5	3	+2	6	Knockout stage and 2019 FIFA U-17 World Cup
3	Uganda	3	1	1	1	4	2	+2	4	
4	Tanzania (H)	3	0	0	3	6	12	−6	0	

Source: CAF
Rules for classification: Group stage tiebreakers
(H) Hosts
14 April 2019
16:00

Tanzania	4–5	Nigeria
Godfrey 22', 60' (pen.); Pius 52'; Abraham 58' (pen.)	Report	Olaniyan 21'; Ubani 30', 72'; Amoo 37'; Jabaar 79'

National Stadium, Dar es Salaam
Referee: Issa Sy (Senegal)
14 April 2019
19:00

Angola	1–0	Uganda
Capita 32'	Report

National Stadium, Dar es Salaam
Referee: Nabil Boukhalfa (Algeria)

17 April 2019
14:00

Nigeria	1–0	Angola
Olusegun 21' (pen.)	Report

National Stadium, Dar es Salaam
Referee: Hassan El Ghandour (Egypt)
17 April 2019
17:00

Uganda	3–0	Tanzania
Kawooya 16'; Asaba 28'; Yiga 77'	Report

National Stadium, Dar es Salaam
Referee: Samir Guezzaz (Morocco)

20 April 2019
16:00

Tanzania	2–4	Angola
Omary 12'; Ngoda 44'	Report	Mimo 17'; Capita 41' (pen.), 72'; David 68'

National Stadium, Dar es Salaam
Referee: Abdulwahid Huraywidah (Libya)
20 April 2019
16:00

Nigeria	1–1	Uganda
Jabaar 74'	Report	Alou 69'

Chamazi Stadium, Mbagala
Referee: Blaise Yuven Ngwa (Cameroon)

=== Group B ===
Pos	Team	Pld	W	D	L	GF	GA	GD	Pts	Qualification
1	Cameroon	3	2	1	0	4	1	+3	7	Knockout stage and 2019 FIFA U-17 World Cup
2	Guinea (D)	3	2	0	1	3	3	0	6	Advanced to the knockout stage, but disqualified after the tournament.
3	Senegal	3	0	2	1	2	3	−1	2	2019 FIFA U-17 World Cup
4	Morocco	3	0	1	2	2	4	−2	1	

Source: CAF
Rules for classification: Group stage tiebreakers
(D) Disqualified
15 April 2019
14:00

Guinea	0–2	Cameroon
	Report	Mvoué 42'; Wamba 72'

Chamazi Stadium, Mbagala
Referee: Tsegay Mogos Teklu (Eritrea)
15 April 2019
17:00

Morocco	1–1	Senegal
Bentayeb 47'	Report	Baldé 88'

Chamazi Stadium, Mbagala
Referee: Abdoul Karim Twagiramukiza (Rwanda)

18 April 2019
14:00

Cameroon	2–1	Morocco
Seidou 73', 90+2'	Report	Bentayeb 22'

Chamazi Stadium, Mbagala
Referee: Beida Dahane (Mauritania)
18 April 2019
17:00

Senegal	1–2	Guinea
S. Diallo 10'	Report	Bah 33'; Fanyé 80'

Chamazi Stadium, Mbagala
Referee: Mashood Ssali (Uganda)

21 April 2019
16:00

Guinea	1–0	Morocco
Fanyé 64'	Report

Chamazi Stadium, Mbagala
Referee: Pierre Atcho (Gabon)
21 April 2019
16:00

Cameroon	0–0	Senegal
	Report

National Stadium, Dar es Salaam
Referee: Jonesia Rukyaa Kabakama (Tanzania)

== Knockout stage ==
In the knockout stage, penalty shoot-out (no extra time) was used to decide the winner if necessary (Regulations Article 73).

=== Bracket ===
Semi-finals
24 April – Dar es Salaam
Nigeria	0 (9)
Guinea (p)	0 (10)
24 April – Dar es Salaam
Cameroon (p)	0 (4)
Angola	0 (3)

Final
28 April – Dar es Salaam
Guinea	0 (3)
Cameroon (p)	0 (5)
Third place match
27 April – Dar es Salaam
Nigeria	1
Angola	2

=== Semi-finals ===
24 April 2019
16:00

Nigeria	0–0	Guinea
	Report
Penalties
Jabaar (penalty scored); Ishaya (penalty scored); Olusegun (penalty scored); Ikenna (penalty scored); Olaniyan (penalty scored); Tanko (penalty scored); Abdullahi (penalty scored); Ubani (penalty scored); Tijani (penalty scored); Oduko (penalty missed)	9–10	(penalty scored) A. Bangoura; (penalty scored) Touré; (penalty scored) Conté; (penalty scored) Tidiany; (penalty scored) Keita; (penalty scored) M. Bangoura; (penalty scored) Bah; (penalty scored) Breze; (penalty scored) Kalil; (penalty scored) Lamine

National Stadium, Dar es Salaam
Referee: Andofetra Rakotojaona (Madagascar)

24 April 2019
19:30

Cameroon	0–0	Angola
	Report
Penalties
Mvoué (penalty scored); Ndongo (penalty scored); Noah (penalty scored); Amadou (penalty scored)	4–3	(penalty scored) Domingos; (penalty scored) Cisco; (penalty missed) Pablo; (penalty scored) Zito; (penalty missed) Porfirio

National Stadium, Dar es Salaam
Referee: Issa Sy (Senegal)

=== Third place match ===
27 April 2019
16:00

Nigeria	1–2	Angola
Ubani 30'	Report	Capita 27'; Zito 49'

National Stadium, Dar es Salaam
Referee: Abdoul Karim Twagiramukiza (Rwanda)

=== Final ===
28 April 2019
16:00

Guinea	0–0	Cameroon
	Report
Penalties
A. Bangoura (penalty scored); Touré (penalty scored); Conté (penalty scored); Sacko (penalty missed)	3–5	(penalty scored) Mvoué; (penalty scored) Ndongo; (penalty scored) Wamba; (penalty scored) Nang; (penalty scored) Alioum

National Stadium, Dar es Salaam
Referee: Dahane Beida (Mauritania)

== Winners ==
2019 Africa U-17 Cup of Nations

Cameroon
Second title

== Awards ==
The following awards were given at the conclusion of the tournament:

Top Goalscorer	Most Valuable Player	Fair Play award
(Angola) Capita	(Cameroon) Stève Mvoué	Angola

== Goalscorers ==
There were 36 goals scored in 16 matches, for an average of 2.25 goals per match.

4 goals

- (Angola) Capita

3 goals

- (Nigeria) Wisdom Ubani

2 goals

- (Cameroon) Ismaïla Seidou
- (Guinea) Momo Fanyé
- (Morocco) Tawfik Bentayeb
- (Nigeria) Ibraheem Jabaar
- (Tanzania) Edmund Godfrey

1 goal

- (Angola) David
- (Angola) Mimo
- (Angola) Zito
- (Cameroon) Stève Mvoué
- (Cameroon) Léonel Wamba
- (Guinea) Algassime Bah
- (Nigeria) Akinkunmi Amoo
- (Nigeria) Olatomi Olaniyan
- (Nigeria) Olakunle Olusegun
- (Senegal) Aliou Baldé
- (Senegal) Samba Diallo
- (Tanzania) Morice Abraham
- (Tanzania) Agiri Ngoda
- (Tanzania) Omary Jumanne Omary
- (Tanzania) Kelvin Pius
- (Uganda) Ivan Asaba
- (Uganda) John Alou
- (Uganda) Andrew Kawooya
- (Uganda) Najib Yiga

== Qualified teams for FIFA U-17 World Cup ==
The following four teams from CAF qualified for the 2019 FIFA U-17 World Cup.

Team	Qualified on	Previous appearances in FIFA U-17 World Cup^{1}
Cameroon	18 April 2019	1 (2003)
Nigeria	20 April 2019	11 (**1985**, 1987, 1989, **1993**, 1995, 2001, 2003, **2007**, 2009, **2013**, **2015**)
Angola	20 April 2019	0 (debut)
Senegal	17 May 2019	0 (debut)

^{1} Bold indicates champions for that year. Italic indicates hosts for that year.

== Concerns and controversies ==
- Following Morocco's loss to Cameroon in the group stage, the Royal Moroccan Football Federation lodged a complaint with CAF over allegations that Cameroon had fielded over-age players and falsified documents. The case was dismissed due to insufficient evidence.
- Following Senegal's loss to Guinea in the group stage, the Senegalese Football Federation lodged a complaint with CAF over allegations that Guinea had fielded over-age players and falsified documents, and the Nigeria Football Federation lodged a complaint with CAF following Nigeria's loss to Guinea in the semi-finals about Aboubacar Conte and Ahmed Tidiane Keita. In 2017, Guinea had a team at the International Dream Cup in Japan: two of the players involved, Aboubacar Conte and Ahmed Tidiane Keita been registered with a date of birth that would make those players ineligible for the competition. After both complaints were upheld, Guinea was ejected from the competition, being replaced by Senegal for the 2019 FIFA U-17 World Cup spot.

=== Guinean Football Federation punishment ===
CAF imposed the following penalties on the Guinean Football Federation:

- Guinea's representative team were excluded from the 2019 FIFA U-17 World Cup, and the team was also barred from entering the next two editions of the competition.
- The Guinean Football Federation was also fined $50,000 USD, with a further $50,000 USD fine (in addition to any other penalty) should a similar incident reoccur within the next four years.
- CAF ejected Guinea from the competition, with its results being deleted from the records, and requested the return of the runners-up medals: failure to do so would result in an additional fine of $20,000 USD.
- The two players with falsified documents, Aboubacar Conte and Tidiane Keita, and the Guinean Football Federation official who filed these falsified documents, were all banned from involvement in football for two years.
