= 2018 UNAF U-17 Tournament squads =

The 2018 UNAF U-17 Tournament is an international football tournament hosted by Tunisia from 20 to 28 August 2018.

== Teams ==
=== Algeria ===
Coach: Sofiane Boudjella

=== Morocco ===
Coach: Jamal Sellami

No.	Pos.	Player	Date of birth (age)	Caps	Club
1	GK	Taha Mourid			(Morocco) Wydad Casablanca
2		Alaa Bellaarouch			(Morocco) AMF
3		Reda Asmama			(Morocco) AMF
4		Oussama Raoui			(Morocco) FUS Rabat
5		Youssef Oujdal			(Morocco) AMF
6		Achraf Ramzi			(Morocco) FUS Rabat
7		Anas Nanah			(Morocco) AMF
8		Akram Nakach			(Morocco) AMF
9		Mohammed Amine Essahel			(Morocco) AMF
10		Tawfik Bentayeb			(Morocco) AMF
11		Maouhoub El Mehdi			(Morocco) FUS Rabat
12		Assim Saïd			(Netherlands) NAC Breda
13	MF	Anas Maroun			(Spain) Málaga CF
14	MF	Haitam Abaida	1 June 2002 (aged 16)		(Spain) Málaga CF
15		Zakaria Ghailan			(Spain) FC Barcelona
16	FW	Elias Atiabou	15 January 2002 (aged 16)		(Austria) Red Bull Salzburg
17		Hicham Aderaze			(France) FC Rouen
18		Ilyes Addiche			(France) FC Metz
19	FW	Bilal Ouacharaf			(Spain) Málaga CF
20		El Mehdi El Boussadeqi			(Morocco) FUS Rabat
21		Ahmed El Khiyat			(Morocco) CLA Mohammedia
