= Simon Appiah Asamoah =

Ghanaian footballer (born 2002)

Personal information
- Date of birth: 1 June 2002 (age 24)
- Place of birth: Ghana
- Position: Midfielder

Senior career*
Years	Team	Apps	(Gls)
2018–2022	Liberty Professionals	54	(5)
2022–2024	Mjøndalen	38	(0)

International career
2018	Ghana U17	4	(1)
- * Club domestic league appearances and goals as of 13 June 2024

Simon Appiah Asamoah (born 1 June 2002) is a Ghanaian professional footballer who plays as midfielder. His last club was Mjøndalen, based in Mjøndalen, Buskerud, Norway.

== Club career ==
Asamoah started his senior career with Liberty Professionals in 2018. On 25 March 2018, he made his debut at the age of 16, starting a league match and playing 65 minutes of a 3–1 loss to West African Football Academy. He played another 7 league matches before the league was cancelled due to the Anas Number 12 Expose. In the 2019 season and 2019–20 season he played 2 matches and 13 matches respectively. The latter was however truncated in July 2020 due to the COVID-19 pandemic in Ghana.

Asamoah played his first match of the 2020–21 season during the opening day match on 16 November 2020 coming on in the 70th minute for Razak Boame. On 13 December 2020 he scored his debut Ghana Premier League goal by scoring a brace in a 2–0 victory over Accra Great Olympics, to help Liberty to their first league victory of the season after five matches. The goals were scored in either half of the game and were both assisted by Abraham Wayo. On 10 April 2021, he scored Liberty Professionals second goal, via an assist from Prosper Ahiabu, in their 4–0 victory over Elmina Sharks. On 27 June 2021, Asamoah scored a goal to help Liberty to a 2–0 victory over International Allies. The victory raised their hope of avoiding relegation. Unfortunately, they were later relegated on the final day of the season. He ended the season with 5 goals in 32 league matches.

== International career ==
In 2018, Asamoah capped for the Ghana U17 national team during the 2018 WAFU Zone B U17 tournament which served as the qualifiers for the 2019 Africa U-17 Cup of Nations. The team finished as runners-up to Nigeria after losing through penalty shutout in the final.
