= Amadou Diallo (disambiguation) =

Amadou Diallo (1975–1999) was a Guinean man who was killed by police in New York City.

Amadou Diallo may also refer to:

- Amadou Diallo (footballer, born 1994), a French-Guinean footballer
- Amadou Diallo (footballer, born 2003), an English footballer
- Amado Diallo, a Senegalese footballer

== See also ==
- Amad Diallo, an Ivorian footballer
