= Oskie =

Oskie may refer to:

- nickname of Gordon Slade (1904–1974), American Major League Baseball player
- Jimmy Oskie, American race car driver - see List of National Sprint Car Hall of Fame inductees
- Oscar the Grouch, a character on the children's television series Sesame Street, called Oskie by his girlfriend Grundgetta

== See also ==
- Oskie presentation, a type of cephalic presentation in childbirth
- Osky, nickname of Oskaloosa, Iowa, an American city
- Ousmane Osky, Guinean footballer - see 2019 Africa U-17 Cup of Nations squads
- Oscy, a character in the 1971 film Summer of '42
