= Claudio Mendes =

Bissau-Guinean footballer

Personal information
- Full name: Claudio Mendes Vicente
- Date of birth: 8 December 2000 (age 25)
- Place of birth: Arrecife, Spain
- Height: 1.86 m (6 ft 1 in)
- Position: Winger

Team information
- Current team: Penafiel (on loan from Casa Pia)
- Number: 99

Youth career
- Torrelavega
- Orientación Marítima

Senior career*
Years	Team	Apps	(Gls)
2019–2020	Las Palmas C	21	(1)
2019–2021	Las Palmas B	8	(2)
2020–2023	Las Palmas	24	(1)
2022	→ Rayo Majadahonda (loan)	12	(3)
2022–2023	→ Logroñés (loan)	33	(4)
2023–2024	Cornellà	29	(7)
2024–	Casa Pia	14	(1)
2026–	→ Penafiel (loan)	0	(0)

International career
2018	Guinea-Bissau U17	1	(1)
- * Club domestic league appearances and goals as of 5 September 2026

Claudio Mendes Vicente (born 8 December 2000) is a professional footballer who plays as a left winger for Liga Portugal 2 club Penafiel on loan from Casa Pia. Born in Spain, he represented Guinea-Bissau at youth international level.

== Club career ==
Born in Arrecife, Lanzarote, Canary Islands to Bissau-Guinean parents, Mendes represented SRCyD Torrelavega and CD Orientación Marítima as a youth before joining UD Las Palmas in 2019. Initially assigned to the C-team in Tercera División, he made his senior debut on 31 August of that year, coming on as a half-time substitute in a 1–2 away loss against CD Buzanada.

Mendes scored his first senior goal on 7 September 2019, netting the last in a 3–0 home success over EMF Atlético Unión Güímar. In December, he also started to feature for the reserves in Segunda División B.

Mendes made his first team debut with the Amarillos on 13 June 2020, replacing Juanjo Narváez late into a 0–0 Segunda División home draw against Girona FC; aged 19 years and 188 days, he became the third-youngest debutant of the club's history who was born in the isle of Lanzarote, only behind Sito and Antonio Betancort's debuts.

Mendes scored his first professional goal on 20 September 2020, netting a last-minute equalizer in a 3–3 home draw against CF Fuenlabrada. On 25 January 2022, after being rarely used, he was loaned to Primera División RFEF side CF Rayo Majadahonda for the remainder of the campaign.

On 3 August 2022, Mendes moved to fellow third division side UD Logroñés on loan for one year. On 19 July of the following year, he moved to UE Cornellà in the same tier on a permanent deal.

== International career ==
Born in Spain, Mendes is of Bissau-Guinean descent. He represented the latter's under-18s for the 2019 Africa U-17 Cup of Nations qualification, scoring a goal on his debut.

== Personal life ==
Mendes' twin brother Leo is also a footballer. A goalkeeper, both finished their formation at Orientación before moving to different teams.
