= Teungueth FC =

Association football club in Senegal

- Full name: Teungueth Football Club
- Founded: 2013; 13 years ago
- Ground: Stade Ngalandou Diouf
- Capacity: 7,500
- Chairman: Babacar Ndiaye
- Manager: Beau Saliou Touré
- League: Senegal Premier League
- 2025–26: Champions of 14
- Website: https://teungueth-fc.com/

Teungueth FC is a professional Senegalese football club based in Rufisque. Teungueth is currently playing in the Senegalese Premier League and is ranked 11th on the league table. They play at the Stade Ngalandou Diouf in Rufisque.
