= ASC Yakaar =

Senegalese football club

- Full name: Association Sportive et Culturelle Yakaar
- Ground: Stade Ngalandou Diouf; Rufisque, Senegal
- Capacity: 7,500
- League: Senegal Premier League
- 2010/11: 12th
| Home colours | Away colours |

Association Sportive et Culturelle Yakaar is a Senegalese football club based in Rufisque. They play in the top division in Senegalese football. Their home stadium is Stade Ngalandou Diouf.

== Achievements ==
- Senegal Assemblée Nationale Cup
  - Winners (1): 2008

== Performance in CAF competitions ==
- CAF Confederation Cup: 1 appearance

2009 - First Round

== Current squad ==
Note: Flags indicate national team as defined under FIFA eligibility rules; some limited exceptions apply. Players may hold more than one non-FIFA nationality.

| No. | Pos. | Nation | Player |
|---|---|---|---|
| — | DF | SEN | Boubacar Gassama |
| — | MF | SEN | Sega Diop |

| No. | Pos. | Nation | Player |
|---|---|---|---|
| — | FW | SEN | Pape Abdou Diakhaté |

== Notable players ==
- (Senegal) Amado Diallo
- (Senegal) Makhete Diop
