= Mbankomo Centre of Excellence =

Mbankomo Centre of Excellence Centre d'Excellence de Mbankomo
- Interactive map of the Mbankomo Centre of Excellence; Centre d'Excellence de Mbankomo area
- Alternative names: Mbankomo

General information
- Location: Mbankomo,, Cameroon
- Coordinates: 3.781687°N 11.353721°E
- Construction started: 2008
- Completed: 2010
- Owner: Cn Football

The Mbankomo Centre of Excellence (French: Centre d'Excellence de Mbankomo) is sports training facility owned by the Confederation of African Football (CAF) in Mbankomo, Cameroon which has been operational since 1998. It is situated in the middle of the equatorial forest which gives teams a secluded place for training. The centre also serves as the home venue of the Cameroon national football team.

== History ==
=== Development ===
It was during one of Assisi's Executive Committee meeting in South Africa in April 2003 that the CAF had decided to contribute more to the development of football on the continent through the construction of sports facilities. In its first phase achievements, six regions of Africa had been identified. For the zone in Central Africa, the country of Roger Milla was chosen. The Government of the Republic of Cameroon has offered Mbankomo field, located 24 km from Yaoundé. December 20, 2006, Shorouk, an Egyptian company started work, which in principle should be received in the month of July.

=== Costs ===
Six (6) billion CFA francs. In the opinion of Issa Hayatou, the chairman of the Confederation of African Football (CAF), it is approximately the amount of money already engulfed by his institution in the works construction of the "Centre of Excellence" in Cameroon. The announcement was made last Friday during a site visit by the President of CAF, who was accompanied on the occasion by his employees. In the opinion of Issa Hayatou, the contribution of the International Federation of Association Football (FIFA) is $1.8 million (1.2 in interest-free repayable loan and $600 million in donations). The rest of the investment capital comes from the CAF. He added that the Centre of Excellence Mbankomo could be more expensive: "If the government of Cameroon did not exempt the construction material of all customs duties."

== Tenants ==
Some teams have already used the centre's infrastructure:

- Burkina Faso national football team
- Cameroon national football team

== Facilities ==
Already built over five hectares, 24 hectares were granted by the State of Cameroon, the Academy is located near the centre of Mbankomo, four kilometers from the road Yaounde- Douala. The architectural masterpiece includes a large central building, which has 40 luxury rooms, a restaurant, a conference room and several offices. Two playgrounds for the practice of football are being finalized. A maximum size (90mx120m) field will be covered with synthetic turf and other minimum size (45mx90) will be natural grass.

The centre has the following facilities:

- 02 football playgrounds fields with artificial grass
- 01 playing field with natural grass
- 01 multi playground for volleyball, basketball and handball
- 01 tennis field
- 01 semi-olympic pool
- 35 double rooms
- 05 single rooms
- 02 gyms equipped with fitness equipment of high technology
- 01 sauna room
- 01 steam
- 01 Jacuzzi
- 01 conference room with 110 seats and full sound system with a translation booth
- 04 rooms with sound 30 seats each for the technical preparation of workshops and seminars players
- 01 restaurant of 104 seats
- 01 bar with terrace
- 01 hall giving access to the many facilities of the centre
- 02 villas
- 01 Administration Building
- 01 oxygenation area, which links 24 hectares of land available that are about to be built for walking
- 02 parking spaces for 250 vehicles are constructed
- 09 tanks with a capacity of 12,000 liters for drinkable/clean water supply
- 03 generators for electricity supply

Only 6 hectares of the 24 hectares available are occupied.

== Operations ==
The center, which has been operational since 2010, is located in the quiet equatorial forest, in a secure, ideal-for-training, green housing and seminar environment
