= Akram Nakach =

Moroccan footballer (born 2002)

Personal information
- Date of birth: 7 April 2002 (age 24)
- Place of birth: Casablanca, Morocco
- Height: 1.82 m (6 ft 0 in)
- Position: Left-back

Team information
- Current team: Khor Fakkan
- Number: 30

Youth career
- –2021: Mohammed VI Academy

Senior career*
Years	Team	Apps	(Gls)
2021–2024	Union de Touarga	35	(2)
2024–2025	AS FAR	19	(1)
2025–	Khor Fakkan	2	(0)

International career^{‡}
2018–2019	Morocco U17	5	(1)
2022–2024	Morocco U23	7	(1)
Medal record
Men's football
Representing Morocco
UNAF U-17 Tournament
Winner	2018 Morocco
U-23 Africa Cup of Nations
Winner	2023 Morocco
Olympic Games
Bronze medal – third place	2024 Paris	Team
- * Club domestic league appearances and goals as of 28 March 2024 ‡ National team caps and goals as of 20:57, 26 May 2023 (UTC)

Akram Nakach (Arabic: أكرم نقاش; born 7 April 2002) is a Moroccan professional footballer who plays as a left-back for Khor Fakkan.

== Club career ==
=== Union de Touarga ===
Nakach joined the Mohammed VI Football Academy training center at a young age, where he also received his schooling.

On 1 September 2021, Nakach signed his first professional contract by joining Union de Touarga for three seasons. He played his first season in Botola 2 and was crowned vice-champion in his first season. On 2 September 2022, he played his first match in Botola Pro against DHJ, coming on in the 81st minute in place of Omar Namsaoui (defeat, 1–0). On 2 October, he received his first start in Botola Pro against MA Tétouan (draw, 1-1). Five days later, on 7 October, he gave his team victory by scoring the only goal of the match against SCC Mohammédia thanks to an assist from Éric Mbangossoum (victory, 1–0). His club finished the 2022–23 season in eighth place in the championship standings.

=== AS FAR ===
On 5 July 2024, Nakach joined AS FAR on a four-year contract.

=== Khor Fakkan ===
On 13 July 2025, Nakach moved to UAE Pro League side Khor Fakkan.

== International career ==
Nakach first received a call-up to the Morocco U-17 team in 2018 from manager Jamal Sellami to participate in the UNAF Championship qualifying for the UNAF U-17 Tournament. Facing Algeria U-17 (victory, 5–2), Tunisia U-17 (victory, 1–0) and Libya U-17 (victory, 1–0), the Moroccans won the tournament thanks to three wins out of three matches. Against Tunisia, Nakach scored the only goal of the match. In April 2019, Nakach was officially selected to take part in the African Cup of Nations in Tanzania. The Moroccans were eliminated in the first round, finishing in fourth and last place in the standings of their group composed of Cameroon U17 (defeat, 2–1), Guinea U17 (defeat, 1–0) and Senegal U17 (draw, 1-1).

On 9 June 2023, Nakach was on Issame Charaï's final list to take part in the U23 African Cup which took place in Morocco. He made his first minutes in two friendly preparation matches against Mauritania (victory, 4–1) and Zambia (victory, 4–2), on 15 and 19 June respectively. The group stage matches took place at the end of June against Guinea, Ghana and Congo at the Prince Moulay Abdellah Stadium in Rabat. On the bench for the opening match against Guinea (victory, 2–1), Nakach was absent from the match sheet during the second match against Ghana in place of Oussama El Azzouzi. Morocco thus validated its ticket for the semi-finals of the competition after a victory of 5–1. In the semi-final against Mali, he was absent from the match sheet, while the Moroccans managed to win the match on penalties after a draw of 2-2. The Moroccans then automatically qualified for the 2024 Summer Olympics in Paris and the final of the CAN against Egypt. The final was won by Morocco in extra time against Egypt thanks to a goal by Oussama Targhalline (victory, 2–1).

Selected in September 2023, Nakach entered the game in a friendly match on 7 September against Brazil in Fez (victory, 1–0). A second friendly match scheduled for 11 September in the same city was canceled by the Royal Moroccan Football Federation following the earthquake in Morocco.

On 4 July 2024, Nakach was selected by Tarik Sektioui in a list of 22 players with Morocco to take part in the 2024 Olympic Games.

== Honours ==
Morocco U23

- U-23 Africa Cup of Nations: 2023
- Summer Olympics Bronze Medal: 2024

Morocco U17

- UNAF U-17 Tournament: 2018
