= Ibrahima (footballer) =

French association football player (born 1998)

Personal information
- Full name: Ibrahima Kalil Guirassy
- Date of birth: 14 October 1998 (age 28)
- Place of birth: Blois, France
- Height: 1.90 m (6 ft 3 in)
- Position: Defensive midfielder

Team information
- Current team: União de Leiria
- Number: 98

Youth career
- Marseille
- –2018: Elche

Senior career*
Years	Team	Apps	(Gls)
2017–2018	Elche Ilicitano	28	(3)
2018–2019	Aurillac Arpajon	0	(0)
2019–2020	União Madeira	21	(2)
2020–2022	Varzim	6	(0)
2021–2022	→ São João de Ver (loan)	34	(1)
2022–2024	Oliveirense	42	(1)
2024–2026	Marítimo	66	(5)
2026–	União de Leiria	5	(0)
- * Club domestic league appearances and goals as of 6 September 2026

Ibrahima Kalil Guirassy (born 14 October 1998) is a French professional footballer who plays as a defensive midfielder for Liga Portugal 2 club União de Leiria.

== Career ==
On 14 January 2024, Guirassy left Oliveirense and joined fellow Liga Portugal 2 club Marítimo, signing a two-and-a-half-year contract.

== Career statistics ==
=== Club ===
As of 13 March 2021

Appearances and goals by club, season and competition
Club	Season	League			National cup		Other		Total	
Club	Season	Division	Apps	Goals	Apps	Goals	Apps	Goals	Apps	Goals
Elche Ilicitano	2017–18	Tercera División	28	3	0	0	0	0	28	3
C.F. União	2019–20	Campeonato de Portugal	21	2	1	0	0	0	22	2
Varzim	2020–21	Liga Portugal 2	7	0	1	0	0	0	7	0
São João de Ver (loan)	2020–21	Campeonato de Portugal	5	1	0	0	0	0	5	1
Career total			61	6	2	0	0	0	63	6
