= Oussama Targhalline =

Moroccan footballer (born 2002)

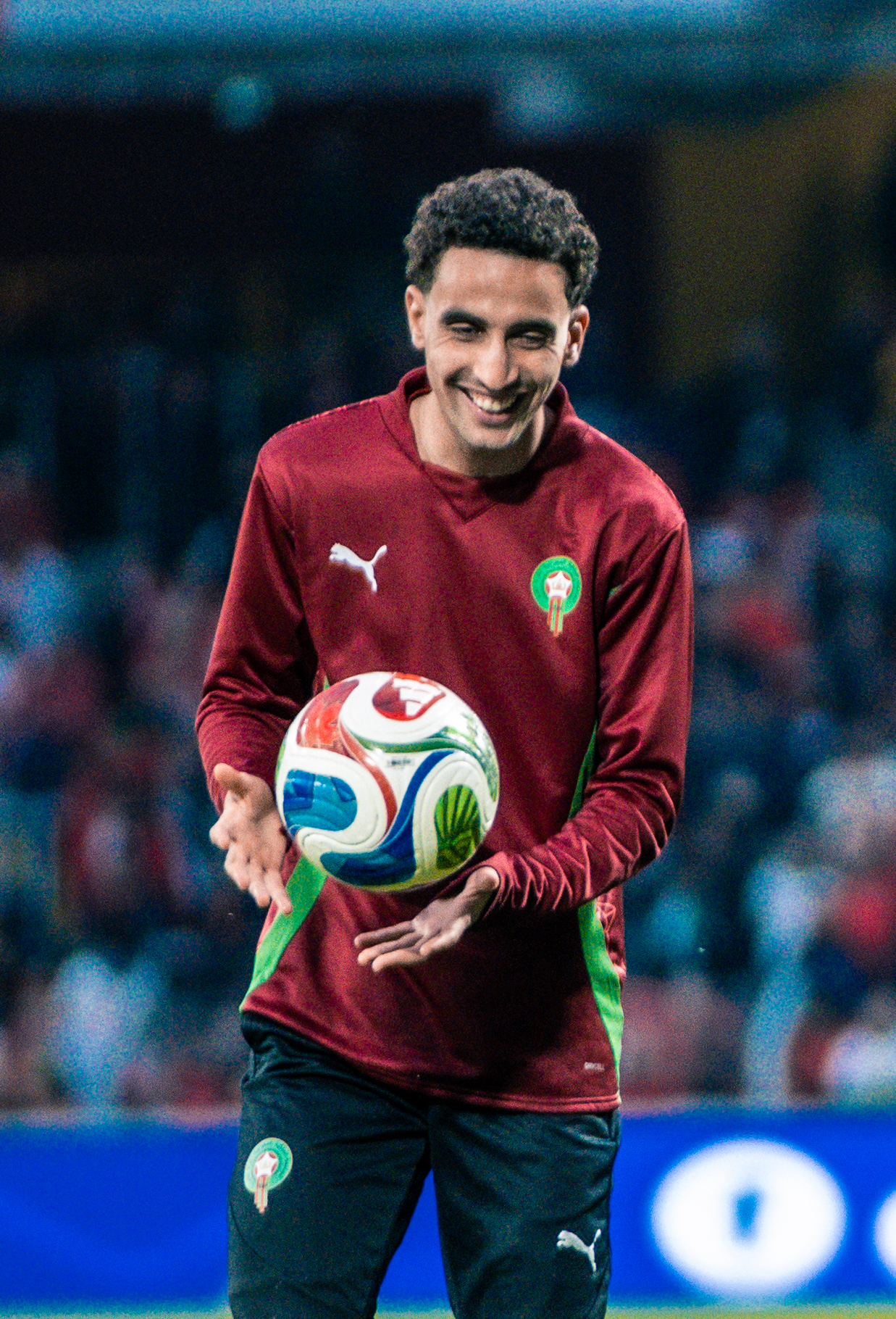
- Targhalline playing for Morocco U23 in 2024

Personal information
- Date of birth: 20 May 2002 (age 24)
- Place of birth: Casablanca, Morocco
- Height: 1.86 m (6 ft 1 in)
- Position: Midfielder

Team information
- Current team: Feyenoord
- Number: 28

Youth career
- –2020: Mohammed VI Academy

Senior career*
Years	Team	Apps	(Gls)
2020–2023	Marseille B	11	(0)
2021–2023	Marseille	2	(0)
2022	→ Alanyaspor (loan)	6	(0)
2023–2025	Le Havre	40	(1)
2025–	Feyenoord	42	(2)

International career^{‡}
2017	Morocco U17	3	(0)
2021–2022	Morocco U20	3	(1)
2022–	Morocco Olympic	20	(2)
2022–	Morocco A'	2	(0)
2024–	Morocco	12	(0)
Medal record
Representing Morocco
Africa Cup of Nations
Winner	2025 Morocco
U-23 Africa Cup of Nations
Winner	2023 Morocco
UNAF U-20 Tournament
Winner	2020 Tunisia
UNAF U-17 Tournament
Winner	2018 Tunisia
Olympic Games
Bronze medal – third place	2024 Paris	Team
- * Club domestic league appearances and goals as of 31 October 2026 ‡ National team caps and goals as of 29 September 2026

Oussama Targhalline (Arabic: أسامة ترغلين; born 20 May 2002) is a Moroccan professional footballer who plays as a midfielder for Eredivisie club Feyenoord and the Morocco national team.

== Club career ==
Targhalline began his career at the Mohammed VI Academy in Salé, Morocco before signing his first professional contract with Marseille at the age of 18. He scored his first senior goal for the club in a mid-season friendly match against Nîmes; Marseille went on to win the match 4–1. Targhalline made his first-team competitive debut for Marseille in a 4–1 Coupe de France win over Cannet Rocheville on 19 December 2021. He made his Ligue 1 debut in a 1–0 win over Bordeaux on 7 January 2022. On 1 August 2022, Targhalline was loaned to Turkish side Alanyaspor.

On 7 January 2023, after being recalled from the loan spell, Targhalline joined Ligue 2 side Le Havre on a permanent deal, signing a contract until June 2025, with an option for another year.

=== Feyenoord ===
On 5 February 2025, Targhalline joined Dutch side Feyenoord on a contract through mid-2028.

== International career ==
Targhalline has represented Morocco at under-17, under-20 and under-23 levels. He was on the final list to participate in the 2020 UNAF U-20 Tournament qualifying for the 2021 Africa U-20 Cup of Nations, and participated in all matches, scoring one goal against Libya.

In June 2023, he was included in the final squad of the under-23 national team for the 2023 U-23 Africa Cup of Nations, hosted by Morocco itself; he scored the winning goal in the 2–1 final victory over Egypt, which helped the Atlas Lions win their first title and qualify for the 2024 Summer Olympics.

Targhalline was selected for Morocco's squad to compete in the men's football at the 2024 Summer Olympics.

Targhalline made his debut for the Morocco national team on 9 September 2024 in a Africa Cup of Nations qualifier against Lesotho at the Adrar Stadium.

On 11 December 2025, Targhalline was called up to the Morocco squad for the 2025 Africa Cup of Nations.

== Career statistics ==
=== Club ===
As of match played 3 November 2026

Appearances and goals by club, season and competition
Club	Season	League			Cup		Europe		Total	
Club	Season	Division	Apps	Goals	Apps	Goals	Apps	Goals	Apps	Goals
Marseille B	2020–21	CFA	3	0	—		—		3	0
Marseille B	2021–22	CFA	8	0	—		—		8	0
Marseille B	Total		11	0	—		—		11	0
Marseille	2021–22	Ligue 1	2	0	1	0	—		3	0
Alanyaspor (loan)	2022–23	Süper Lig	6	0	1	0	—		7	0
Le Havre	2022–23	Ligue 2	12	1	—		—		12	1
Le Havre	2023–24	Ligue 1	14	0	2	0	—		16	0
Le Havre	2024–25	Ligue 1	14	0	0	0	—		14	0
Le Havre	Total		40	1	2	0	—		42	1
Feyenoord	2024–25	Eredivisie	6	0	—		0	0	6	0
Feyenoord	2025–26	Eredivisie	25	2	0	0	8 (Note: One appearance in UEFA Champions League, seven appearances in UEFA Europa League)	0	33	2
Feyenoord	2026–27	Eredivisie	10	0	0	0	4 (Note: Appearances in UEFA Champions League)	0	14	0
Feyenoord	Total		41	2	0	0	12	0	53	2
Career total			100	3	4	0	12	0	116	3

=== International ===
As of match played 29 September 2026

Appearances and goals by national team and year
National team	Year	Apps	Goals
Morocco	2024	1	0
Morocco	2025	6	0
Morocco	2026	5	0
Total		12	0

== Honours ==
Le Havre

- Ligue 2: 2022–23

Morocco U17

- UNAF U-17 Tournament: 2018

Morocco U20

- UNAF U-20 Tournament: 2020

Morocco U23

- Africa U-23 Cup of Nations: 2023
- Summer Olympics Bronze Medal: 2024

Morocco

- Africa Cup of Nations: 2025
