= 2018 UNAF U-17 Tournament =

Tournament details
- Country: Tunisia
- Dates: 20–28 August
- Teams: 4

Final positions
- Champions: Morocco (3rd title)
- Runners-up: Algeria
- Third place: Tunisia

Tournament statistics
- Matches played: 6
- Goals scored: 14 (2.33 per match)
- Top goal scorer(s): (Algeria) Riad Rahmoune (Morocco) Tawfik Bentayeb (3 goals each)

The 2018 UNAF U-17 Tournament is the 13th edition of the UNAF U-17 Tournament. The tournament took place in Tunisia between 20 and 28 August 2018. This edition serve as a qualification for the Africa U-17 Cup of Nations, the winner will qualify for the 2019 Africa U-17 Cup of Nations held in Tanzania.

== Participants ==
- Algeria
- Libya
- Morocco
- Tunisia (hosts)
- Egypt (withdrawn)

== Venues ==
Stade Mustapha Ben Jannet, Monastir
Stade Olympique de Sousse, Sousse

== Match officials ==
The following referees were chosen for the 2018 UNAF U-17 Tournament.

Referees

- (Algeria) Nabil Boukhalfa
- (Egypt) Ahmed El-Ghandour
- (Egypt) Amin Mohamed Omar
- (Libya) Ayman Al-Sharif
- (Morocco) Samir Guezzaz
- (Tunisia) Haythem Guirat

Assistant referees

- (Algeria) Mohamed Serradji
- (Egypt) Samir Jamal Saad
- (Egypt) Ali Tawfiq Taleb
- (Libya) Ibrahim Boukouz
- (Morocco) Mustapha Akerkad
- (Tunisia) Khalil Hassani

== Tournament ==
Pos	Team	Pld	W	D	L	GF	GA	GD	Pts	Qualification
1	Morocco	3	3	0	0	7	2	+5	9	2019 Africa U-17 Cup of Nations
2	Algeria	3	1	1	1	5	6	−1	4	
3	Tunisia (H)	3	1	0	2	1	3	−2	3	
4	Libya	3	0	1	2	1	3	−2	1	

Updated to match(es) played on 24 August 2018. Source: CAF
Rules for classification: Group tiebreakers
(H) Hosts

All times are local, CET (UTC+1).

20 August 2018
19:15

Tunisia	1–0	Libya
Ben Amira 85'	Report

Stade Mustapha Ben Jannet, Monastir
Referee: Samir Guezzaz (Morocco)
20 August 2018
20:15

Algeria	2–5	Morocco
Bouzida 84'; Benali 86'	Report	Bentayeb 7', 53'; Ouchraf 27', 29'; Ghilane 80'

Stade Olympique de Sousse, Sousse
Referee: Ayman Al-Sharif (Libya)

24 August 2018
19:15

Tunisia	0–2	Algeria
	Report	Rahmoune 58', 78'

Stade Mustapha Ben Jannet, Monastir
Referee: Ahmed El-Ghandour (Egypt)
24 August 2018
20:15

Morocco	1–0	Libya
Bentayeb 20'	Report

Stade Olympique de Sousse, Sousse
Referee: Nabil Boukhalfa (Algeria)

28 August 2018
19:15

Morocco	1–0	Tunisia
Nakach 20'	Report

Stade Mustapha Ben Jannet, Monastir
Referee: Amin Mohamed Omar (Egypt)
28 August 2018
20:15

Algeria	1–1	Libya
Rahmoune 25'	Report	Al-Mesrati 34'

Stade Olympique de Sousse, Sousse
Referee: Haythem Guirat (Tunisia)

== Goalscorers ==
3 goals

- (Algeria) Riad Rahmoune
- (Morocco) Tawfik Bentayeb

2 goals

- (Morocco) Bilal Ouchraf

1 goal

- (Algeria) Nabil Benali
- (Algeria) Belkacem Bouzida
- (Libya) Ibrahim Al-Mesrati
- (Morocco) Akram Nakach
- (Morocco) Zakaria Ghilane
- (Tunisia) Mehdi Ben Amira
