= Mohammed Umar =

Ghanaian footballer (born 2002)

Personal information
- Date of birth: 11 December 2002 (age 23)
- Place of birth: Ghana
- Height: 1.93 m (6 ft 4 in)
- Position: Centre back

Youth career
- Rising Star Academy

Senior career*
| Years | Team | Apps | (Gls) |
| 2022 | Medeama | 2 | (0) |
| 2023–2024 | Ilves | 18 | (0) |
| 2023–2024 | Ilves II | 4 | (0) |
| 2024–2026 | Politehnica Iași | 14 | (0) |

International career
| 2018–2019 | Ghana U17 | 2 | (1) |
- * Club domestic league appearances and goals as of 2 May 2026

Mohammed Umar (born 11 December 2002) is a Ghanaian professional footballer who plays as a centre back.

== Club career ==
Umar made his senior debut with Medeama S.C. in Ghana Premier League in 2022.

In the early 2023, he moved to Finland after signing with Veikkausliiga club Ilves. He debuted in the league on 15 April 2023, in a 2–1 home win over Inter Turku. On 30 September 2023, Umar and Ilves won the 2023 Finnish Cup, after defeating FC Honka 2–1 in the final. After the season, the club exercised their option to extend his deal for the 2024. On 4 August, his contract was terminated.

On 1 November 2024, Umar signed with Romanian Liga I side Politehnica Iași on a contract until 2027.

== International career ==
Umar has captained the Ghana under-17 national team.

== Career statistics ==
As of 2 May 2026

Appearances and goals by club, season and competition
| Club | Season | League | | | National cup (Note: Includes Suomen Cup, Cupa României) | | League cup (Note: Includes Finnish League Cup) | | Europe | | Total | |
| Club | Season | Division | Apps | Goals | Apps | Goals | Apps | Goals | Apps | Goals | Apps | Goals |
|---|---|---|---|---|---|---|---|---|---|---|---|---|
| Medeama | 2021–22 | Ghana Premier League | 2 | 0 | 0 | 0 | — | | — | | 2 | 0 |
| Ilves | 2023 | Veikkausliiga | 14 | 0 | 3 | 0 | 5 | 0 | — | | 22 | 0 |
| Ilves | 2024 | Veikkausliiga | 4 | 0 | 0 | 0 | 3 | 0 | 0 | 0 | 7 | 0 |
| Ilves | Total | | 18 | 0 | 3 | 0 | 8 | 0 | 0 | 0 | 29 | 0 |
| Ilves II | 2023 | Kakkonen | 1 | 0 | — | | — | | — | | 1 | 0 |
| Ilves II | 2024 | Kakkonen | 3 | 0 | — | | — | | — | | 3 | 0 |
| Ilves II | Total | | 4 | 0 | — | | — | | — | | 4 | 0 |
| Politehnica Iași | 2024–25 | Liga I | 12 | 0 | 3 | 1 | — | | — | | 15 | 1 |
| Politehnica Iași | 2025–26 | Liga II | 2 | 0 | 0 | 0 | — | | — | | 2 | 0 |
| Politehnica Iași | Total | | 14 | 0 | 3 | 1 | — | | — | | 17 | 1 |
| Career total | | | 38 | 0 | 6 | 1 | 8 | 0 | 0 | 0 | 52 | 1 |

== Honours ==
Ilves

- Finnish Cup: 2023
