= Karim Kimvuidi =

Congolese footballer

Personal information
- Full name: Karim Kimvuidi Ntikubuka
- Date of birth: 13 March 2002 (age 24)
- Place of birth: Kinshasa, DR Congo
- Height: 1.74 m (5 ft 9 in)
- Position: Midfielder

Team information
- Current team: F.C. Ashdod
- Number: 26

Youth career
- TP les âges 2015 2017

Senior career*
Years	Team	Apps	(Gls)
2018–2019	Groupe Bazano		
2019–2022	DC Motema Pembe		
2022–2023	Maritzburg United	29	(0)
2023–2025	Orlando Pirates	25	(2)
2025–	F.C. Ashdod	24	(4)

International career^{‡}
2021	DR Congo	1	(0)
- * Club domestic league appearances and goals as of 1 June 2026 ‡ National team caps and goals as of 27 March 2024

Karim Kimvuidi (born 13 March 2002) is a Congolese footballer who plays as an attacking midfielder or winger for F.C. Ashdod in the Israeli Premier League.

He was named in DR Congo's squad for the 2020 African Nations Championship, played in 2021, and featured in one game.

After several years in Daring Club Motema Pembe, he went to South African club Maritzburg United in 2022. Kimvuidi was an outstanding player for Maritzburg United, but the club was relegated from the 2022-23 South African Premier Division. As such, the club had several offers for their best players, and Kimvuidi transferred to Orlando Pirates in July 2023. He made his Bucs debut in September 2023 against Mamelodi Sundowns. He played regularly, but did not establish himself as a starter yet.
