= Amado Diallo =

Senegalese footballer

Amadou Diallo
Personal information
- Full name: Amadou Sadio Diallo
- Date of birth: June 13, 1981 (age 45)
- Place of birth: Sakal, Senegal
- Height: 1.83 m (6 ft 0 in)
- Position: Striker

Team information
- Current team: Al-Nasr

Youth career
- 2003–2004: ASC Yakaar

Senior career*
Years	Team	Apps	(Gls)
2005–2006	ASC Yakaar	16	(5)
2007	Chabab Massira	15	(3)
2008	Mouloudia Oujda	10	(2)
2009	Chabab Massira	9	(4)
2009	FUS Rabat	3	(1)
2010	Henan Construction	4	(0)
2011–2019	Al-Suwaiq		
2020–	Al-Nasr		
- * Club domestic league appearances and goals

Amadou Diallo (born 13 June 1981 in Sakal) is a Senegalese football player currently playing for Omani football club Al-Nasr.

== Career ==
He played for several clubs in Morocco such as Mouloudia Oujda and Chabab Massira. It was confirmed on the website of Henan Construction that he completed the transfer to Henan on February 12, 2010.
