= Ibraheem Jabaar =

Nigerian footballer

Personal information
- Full name: Ibraheem Olalekan Jabaar
- Date of birth: 24 October 2002 (age 24)
- Place of birth: Osun, Nigeria
- Height: 1.68 m (5 ft 6 in)
- Position: Winger

Team information
- Current team: Stellenbosch
- Number: 27

Senior career*
Years	Team	Apps	(Gls)
- Ijebu United
- Olisa
2021–2023	Stellenbosch	64	(2)
2023–2024	Maccabi Petah Tikva	27	(0)
2024–	Stellenbosch	40	(2)

International career^{‡}
2019–	Nigeria U17	9	(2)
- * Club domestic league appearances and goals as of 17 May 2026 ‡ National team caps and goals as of 20:30, 10 April 2021 (UTC)

Ibraheem Olalekan Jabaar (born 24 October 2002) is a Nigerian footballer who plays as a winger for Tanzania NBC premier league club Simba Sports Club.

== Club career ==
After playing for Ijebu United and Olisa in Nigeria, Jabaar signed for Stellenbosch of the South African Premier Division in February 2021 on a contract of an undisclosed length. He made his debut for the club on 21 February 2021 in a 1–0 defeat away to Tshakhuma Tsha Madzivhandila.

== International career ==
Jabaar has played for the Nigeria national under-17 team at the 2019 FIFA U-17 World Cup and the 2019 Africa U-17 Cup of Nations.
