= Stade Ngalandou Diouf =

Sports stadium in Senegal, Africa

- Location of the stadium
- Location: Rufisque, Senegal
- Coordinates: 14.7273°N 17.2810°W
- Capacity: 7,500
- Surface: Artificial turf

Tenants
- Teungueth FC; ASC Yakaar

Stade Ngalandou Diouf is a multi-use stadium in Rufisque, Senegal. It is currently used mostly for football matches and serves as a home ground of ASC Yakaar and Teungueth FC. The stadium holds 7,500 people.
