= David Nzanza =

Angolan footballer (born 2003)

Personal information
- Full name: David Muale Nzanza
- Date of birth: 28 September 2003 (age 23)
- Place of birth: Luanda, Angola
- Height: 1.83 m (6 ft 0 in)
- Position: Forward

Team information
- Current team: Castellón
- Number: 24

Youth career
- Interclube
- 2022: Braga

Senior career*
Years	Team	Apps	(Gls)
2019–2022	Interclube	7	(1)
2022–2023	Braga B	7	(1)
2024	Znojmo	17	(2)
2024–2025	Baník Ostrava B	4	(0)
2025–2026	Leça	25	(11)
2026–	Castellón	2	(0)

International career
2019	Angola U17	8	(2)
- * Club domestic league appearances and goals as of 17 October 2026

David Muale Nzanza (born 28 September 2003) is an Angolan professional footballer who plays as a forward for Segunda División club Castellón.

== Club career ==
Born in Luanda, Nzanza began his career with Interclube, making his first team debut in 2019. On 13 January 2022, he moved abroad and signed an 18-month contract with Portuguese side Braga.

Nzanza initially played for the B-team in the Liga 3 before being assigned to the under-23 squad in July 2022. In February 2024, he joined Znojmo of the Czech Moravian-Silesian Football League. On 12 July, he was announced at Baník Ostrava to play for their B-squad in the Czech National Football League.

On 11 August 2025, Nzanza joined Campeonato de Portugal side Leça. He scored 14 goals for the side during the season, including the opener in the league champions final against Vitória de Sernache, to help them promote to Liga 3.

On 23 July 2026, Nzanza signed a four-year contract with Spanish Segunda División club Castellón, for a rumoured fee of € 60,000.

== International career ==
Nzanza played in the 2019 U-17 Africa Cup of Nations and the 2019 FIFA U-17 World Cup for the Angola national under-17 team, aged 15 in the former tournament.
