= Morice Abraham =

Tanzanian footballer (born 2003)

Personal information
- Full name: Morice Michael Abraham
- Date of birth: 13 August 2003 (age 23)
- Place of birth: Tabata, Tanzania
- Height: 1.65 m (5 ft 5 in)
- Position: Midfielder

Team information
- Current team: Simba
- Number: 18

Youth career
- Alliance Mwanza
- Spartak Subotica

Senior career*
Years	Team	Apps	(Gls)
2021–2025	Spartak Subotica	20	(0)
2023–2024	→ RFK Novi Sad (loan)	7	(1)
2025–	Simba		

International career^{‡}
2019	Tanzania U17	3	(0)
2023–	Tanzania	11	(0)
- * Club domestic league appearances and goals as of 29 December 2025 ‡ National team caps and goals as of 15 November 2025

Morice Michael Abraham (born 13 August 2003) is a Tanzanian professional footballer who plays as a midfielder for Tanzanian Premier League club Simba and the Tanzania national team.

== Club career ==
Abraham is a former youth academy player of Alliance Mwanza. In September 2021, he signed a four-year contract with Serbian club Spartak Subotica. He made his professional debut for the club on 28 November 2021 in a 3–0 defeat against Red Star Belgrade.

== International career ==
Abraham was captain of Tanzanian squad at 2019 Africa U-17 Cup of Nations.

== Career statistics ==
=== Club ===
As of 28 November 2021

Appearances and goals by club, season and competition
Club	Season	League			Cup		Continental		Total	
Club	Season	Division	Apps	Goals	Apps	Goals	Apps	Goals	Apps	Goals
Spartak Subotica	2021–22	Serbian SuperLiga	5	0	0	0	—		5	0
Spartak Subotica	2022–23	Serbian SuperLiga	15	0	2	0	—		17	0
Career total			20	0	2	0	0	0	22	0

=== International ===
As of match played 15 November 2025

Appearances and goals by national team and year
National team	Year	Apps	Goals
Tanzania	2023	3	0
Tanzania	2024	5	0
Tanzania	2025	3	0
Total		11	0
