= Najib Yiga =

Ugandan footballer

Personal information
- Full name: Najib Yiga
- Place of birth: Mubende
- Position: Forward

Team information
- Current team: SC Villa
- Number: 32

Youth career
- Years: Team
- Vipers SC
- Kitara FC

Najib Yiga (born December 18, 2002) is a Ugandan professional footballer who plays as a Forward/Midfielder for SC Villa. Najib Yiga, is a son to Abdullah Yiga and Annet Nabukenya from Mubende. Yiga’s role model is Halid Lwaliwa, and he is left-footed in play. He won three league titles (2020, 2022, 2023) and two Uganda Cups (2021, 2023) with Vipers.

== Club career ==
Yiga started through St. Mary’s Kitende school team and Vipers Junior Team, loaned to Kitara FC in 2023–24 season (six league appearances) while still under contract with Vipers SC and in June 2024, he joined SC Villa.

== International career ==
Uganda U-17 (The Cubs): Yiga represented Uganda in youth tournaments.

Uganda U-20 (The Hippos): he was named in the provisional squad for the 2021 U-20 AFCON qualifiers, then started and played key matches at the 2021 AFCON U-20 tournament in Mauritania.

Uganda U-23 (The Kobs): Yiga competed in the 2021 CECAFA U-23 Challenge Cup classification matches, scoring in the 1–0 win over the Democratic Republic of Congo and again in the 2–1 victory against Eritrea.
