= Stève Mvoué =

Cameroonian footballer (born 2002)

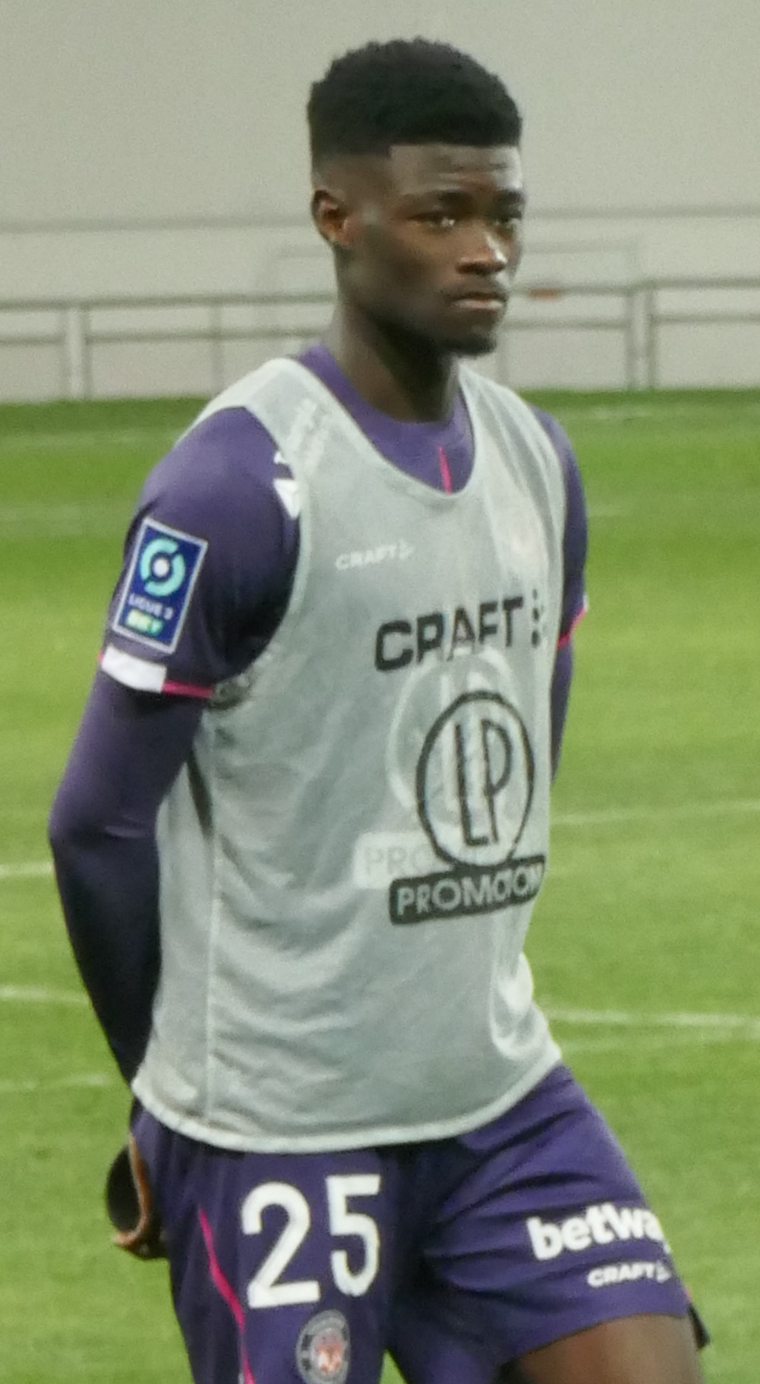
- Mvoué with Toulouse in 2022

Personal information
- Full name: Stève Regis Mvoué
- Date of birth: 2 February 2002 (age 24)
- Place of birth: Yaoundé, Cameroon
- Height: 1.85 m (6 ft 1 in)
- Position: Midfielder

Team information
- Current team: Start
- Number: 10

Youth career
- 2008–2020: Azur Star Yaoundé
- 2020–2021: Toulouse

Senior career*
Years	Team	Apps	(Gls)
2021–2022	Toulouse	4	(1)
2021–2022	Toulouse B	7	(2)
2022–2024	Seraing	29	(1)
2024	Portimonense	3	(0)
2024–2025	Paris 13 Atletico	1	(0)
2025–	Start	39	(4)

International career^{‡}
2019	Cameroon U17	7	(1)
2019	Cameroon	1	(0)
- * Club domestic league appearances and goals as of 22 August 2026 ‡ National team caps and goals as of 04:09, 25 November 2021 (UTC)

Stève Regis Mvoué (born 2 February 2002) is a Cameroonian professional footballer who plays as a midfielder for Start.

== Club career ==
Mvoué joined the youth academy of Azur Star Yaoundé when he was 6. On 4 July 2019, he signed a pre-agreement with Toulouse to join the side on his 18th birthday in February 2020.

On 20 January 2021, Mvoué made his professional debut in a 1–0 Coupe de France win over Chamois Niortais.

On 7 September 2022, Mvoué signed a two-year contract with the Belgian Pro League club Seraing. The contract was terminated by mutual consent on 22 January 2024.

On 25 January 2024, Mvoué signed a two-and-a-half-year contract with Portuguese Primeira Liga club Portimonense.

On 11 September 2024, Mvoué joined Championnat National club Paris 13 Atletico.

On 5 February 2025, Mvoué joined Eliteserien club IK Start. On 1 July 2026, Mvoué signed to extend his contract with the club until 2028, while his previous deal was due to expire in 2026.

== International career ==
Mvoué is a youth international for Cameroon, and was named the Best Player was at the 2019 Africa U-17 Cup of Nations. He represented the senior Cameroon national team in a 2–1 friendly win over Zambia on 9 June 2019.

== Personal life ==
Mvoué's mother Marie Mvoué was a Cameroonian international footballer, and his brother Stéphane Zobo is also a footballer. They were teammates at Toulouse.

== Honours ==
Toulouse

- Ligue 2: 2021–22

IK Start

- OBOS-Ligaen runners-up (promotion to Eliteserien): 2025

Cameroon U17

- Africa U-17 Cup of Nations: 2019

Individual

- Africa U-17 Cup of Nations Player of the Tournament: 2019
