= Domingos Andrade =

Angolan professional footballer

Personal information
- Full name: Domingos Paulo Andrade
- Date of birth: 7 May 2003 (age 23)
- Place of birth: Luanda, Angola
- Height: 1.83 m (6 ft 0 in)
- Position: Defensive midfielder

Team information
- Current team: Botafogo
- Number: 91

Youth career
- 2017–2021: Interclube
- 2021–2022: Sporting CP

Senior career*
Years	Team	Apps	(Gls)
2019–2021	Interclube	13	(0)
2022–2023	Sporting CP B	1	(0)
2023–2024	Felgueiras 1932	24	(1)
2024–2026	Porto B	58	(1)
2026–	Botafogo	1	(0)

International career^{‡}
2019	Angola U17	9	(0)
2021–	Angola	7	(0)
Medal record
Men's football
Representing Angola
COSAFA Cup
Winner	2024 South Africa
- * Club domestic league appearances and goals as of 19 June 2026 ‡ National team caps and goals as of 1 April 2025

Domingos Paulo Andrade (born 7 May 2003) is an Angolan professional footballer who plays as defensive midfielder for club Botafogo and the Angola national team.

== Club career ==
Andrade is a youth product of the Angolan club Interclube since he was 13.

Andrade joined Sporting CP B on 13 September 2021. He made his professional debut on 10 April 2022, coming on as a second-half substitute in a 1–0 away loss to Oliveira do Hospital, in the Liga 3.

On 6 September 2023, Andrade moved to fellow Liga 3 side Felgueiras 1932 on a free transfer, with Sporting CP keeping 50% of his economic rights.

On 18 July 2024, Andrade moved to Liga Portugal 2 side FC Porto B.

== International career ==
Andrade debuted with the Angola national team in a 1–1 2022 FIFA World Cup qualification tie with Libya on 16 November 2021.
