= Kelvin John =

Tanzanian footballer (born 2003)

Personal information
- Full name: Kelvin Pius John
- Date of birth: 10 June 2003 (age 23)
- Place of birth: Morogoro, Tanzania
- Height: 1.79 m (5 ft 10 in)
- Position: Forward

Team information
- Current team: AaB
- Number: 27

Youth career
- 2019–2021: Brooke House College
- 2021–2022: Genk

Senior career*
Years	Team	Apps	(Gls)
2022–2024	Genk	1	(0)
2022–2024	Jong Genk	41	(4)
2024–	AaB	54	(8)

International career^{‡}
2019	Tanzania U17	12	(16)
2021–2023	Tanzania U20	14	(18)
2019–	Tanzania	10	(1)
- * Club domestic league appearances and goals as of 2 June 2026 ‡ National team caps and goals as of 31 December 2025

Kelvin Pius John (born 10 June 2003) is a Tanzanian professional footballer who plays as a forward for Danish 1st Division side AaB and the Tanzania national team.

== Career ==
As a youth player, John joined Brooke House College.

On 31 May 2024 AaB confirmed that the newly promoted Danish Superliga club had signed John from K.R.C. Genk, who signed a four-year contract.

== Career statistics ==
=== International ===
As of matches played 9 October 2020.

National team	Year	Apps	Goals
Tanzania	2019	1	0
Tanzania	2021	1	0
Tanzania	2022	3	0
Total		5	0

== International goals ==
No.	Date	Venue	Opponent	Score	Result	Competition
1.	25 March 2024	Dalga Arena, Baku, Azerbaijan	Mongolia	1–0	3–0	2024 FIFA Series
