= Capita (footballer) =

Angolan footballer (born 2002)

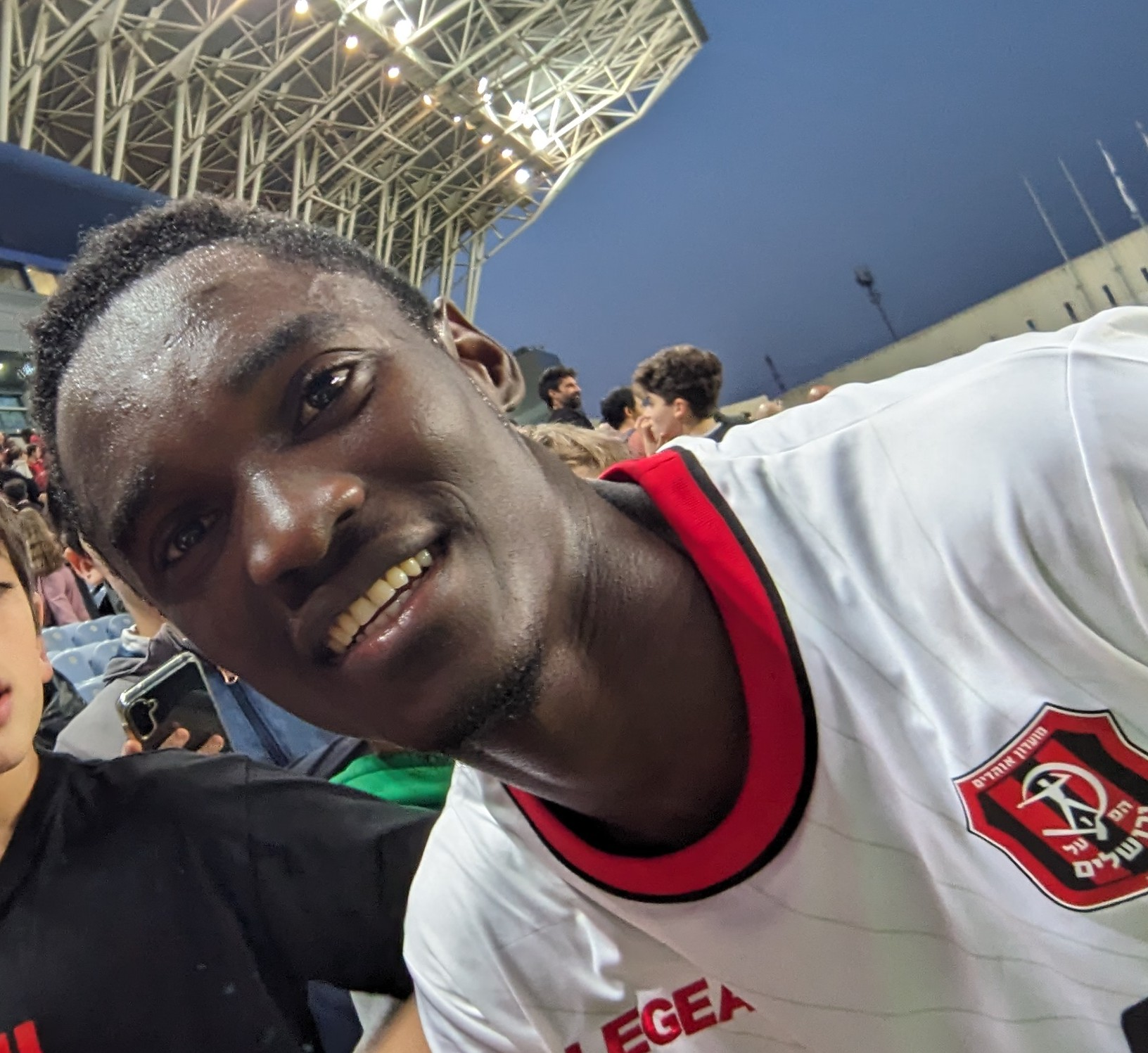
- Capita in 2023

Personal information
- Full name: Osvaldo Pedro Capemba
- Date of birth: 10 January 2002 (age 24)
- Place of birth: Luanda, Angola
- Height: 1.72 m (5 ft 8 in)
- Position: Winger

Team information
- Current team: Sporting Kansas City
- Number: 7

Youth career
- –2017: A.F.A.
- 2018: CD Marinha
- 2019: 1º de Agosto

Senior career*
Years	Team	Apps	(Gls)
2020	Trofense	3	(0)
2020–2022	Lille B	12	(2)
2020–2021	→ Mouscron (loan)	3	(0)
2022	→ Trofense (loan)	10	(4)
2022–2024	Estrela da Amadora	11	(2)
2023–2024	→ Hapoel Jerusalem (loan)	20	(1)
2024–2026	Radomiak Radom	37	(12)
2026–	Sporting Kansas City	9	(1)

International career
2019	Angola U17	9	(8)
2023	Angola U-23	1	(2)
2021–	Angola	3	(0)
- * Club domestic league appearances and goals as of 22:07, 20 May 2026 (UTC)

Osvaldo Pedro Capemba (born 10 January 2002), commonly known as Capita, is an Angolan professional footballer who plays as a winger for Major League Soccer club Sporting Kansas City.

== International career ==
Capita made his debut for Angola national team on 12 November 2021 in a World Cup qualifier against Egypt.

== Career statistics ==
=== Club ===
As of match played 5 March 2026

Appearances and goals by club, season and competition
Club	Season	League			National cup (Note: Includes Belgian Cup, Israel State Cup, Polish Cup)		Other		Total	
Club	Season	Division	Apps	Goals	Apps	Goals	Apps	Goals	Apps	Goals
Trofense	2019–20	Campeonato de Portugal	3	0	0	0	—		3	0
Lille B	2020–21	Championnat National 3	2	0	—		—		2	0
Lille B	2021–22	Championnat National 3	10	2	—		—		10	2
Lille B	Total		12	2	—		—		12	2
Mouscron (loan)	2020–21	Belgian First Division A	3	0	1	0	0	0	4	0
Trofense (loan)	2021–22	Liga Portugal 2	10	4	0	0	—		10	4
Estrela da Amadora	2022–23	Liga Portugal 2	11	2	0	0	—		0	0
Estrela da Amadora	2023–24	Primeira Liga	0	0	0	0	1 (Note: Appearance in Taça da Liga)	0	1	0
Estrela da Amadora	Total		11	2	0	0	1	0	12	2
Hapoel Jerusalem (loan)	2023–24	Israeli Premier League	20	1	1	0	—		21	1
Radomiak Radom	2024–25	Ekstraklasa	17	6	0	0	—		17	6
Radomiak Radom	2025–26	Ekstraklasa	20	6	1	0	—		21	6
Radomiak Radom	Total		37	12	1	0	—		38	12
Career total			96	21	3	0	1	0	100	16

=== International ===
As of match played 5 June 2022

Appearances and goals by national team and year
National team	Year	Apps	Goals
Angola
Angola	2021	1	0
Angola	2022	1	0
Total		2	0
