= Jericho Creek =

Jericho Creek may refer to:

== United States ==
=== California ===
- Jericho Creek (Hunting Creek), a tributary of Hunting Creek in Lake County, California.

=== Indiana ===
- Jericho Creek (Jordan Creek), a tributary of Jordan Creek in Vermillion County, Indiana.
- Jericho Creek (Laughery Creek), a tributary of Laughery Creek in Ripley County, Indiana.

=== Massachusetts ===
- Jericho Creek (Plum Island River), a tributary of the Plum Island River in Essex County, Massachusetts.

=== Montana ===
- Jericho Creek (Telegraph Creek), a tributary of Telegraph Creek in Monroe County, Montana.

=== Oregon ===
- Jericho Creek (North Fork John Day River), a tributary of North Fork John Day River in Umatilla County, Oregon.

=== Pennsylvania ===
- Jericho Creek (Delaware River tributary), a tributary of the Delaware River in Bucks County, Pennsylvania.

=== Texas ===
- Jericho Creek (Flat Fork Creek), a tributary of Flat Fork Creek in Shelby County, Texas.

=== Wisconsin ===
- Jericho Creek (Eagle Spring Lake), a tributary of Eagle Spring Lake in Waukesha County, Wisconsin.
