= Jericho (disambiguation) =

Jericho is a city, populated since ancient times, in the West Bank, in Palestine.

Jericho may also refer to:

== Places ==
=== Australia ===
- Jericho, Queensland, a town and locality
- Shire of Jericho, Queensland, a former local government area (1916–2008)
- Jericho, South Australia, a suburb of Kadina
- Jericho, Tasmania, one of the oldest townships in Australia

=== Canada ===
- Jericho, New Brunswick, a community in Carleton County
- Jericho Beach, Vancouver, British Columbia
- Jericho, a community in the municipality of Lambton Shores, Ontario

=== England ===
- Jericho, Bury, a district
- Jericho, Cumbria, a small hamlet
- Jericho, Oxford, a suburb of Oxford

=== South Africa ===
- Jericho, North West, a village
- Jericho Dam, Mpama River

=== United States ===
- Jericho, Arkansas, a town
- Jericho Trail, a hiking trail in Connecticut
- Jericho, Indiana, an unincorporated community
- Jericho, Kentucky, an unincorporated community
- Jericho Mountain, New Hampshire
- Jericho, Cumberland County, New Jersey, an unincorporated community
- Jericho, Gloucester County, New Jersey, an unincorporated community
- Jericho, New York, a hamlet and census-designated place
- Jericho Historic District, East Hampton, New York
- New York State Route 25 or Jericho Turnpike, a thoroughfare on Long Island, New York
- Jericho, North Carolina, an unincorporated community
- Jericho, Cameron County, Pennsylvania
- Jericho, Wayne County, Pennsylvania
- Jericho, Vermont, a town
  - Jericho (village), Vermont
- Jericho, West Virginia, an unincorporated community
- Jericho, Calumet County, Wisconsin, an unincorporated community
- Jericho, Waukesha County, Wisconsin, an unincorporated community
- Jericho Creek (disambiguation), various creeks throughout the country

=== Elsewhere ===
- Jericho, Nairobi, an estate in Kenya
- Jericho Governorate, West Bank, Palestine
- Jericho, the medieval name of Oricum, in what is now Albania
- Jericho Road, part of Route 417 in Israel

== Films ==
- Jericho (1937 film), also known as Dark Sands, a British film starring Paul Robeson
- Jericho (1946 film), a French film
- Jericho (1991 film), a Venezuelan film
- Jericho (2000 film), a Western mystery film

== Television ==
- Jericho (1966 TV series)
- Jericho (British TV series), a 2005 detective television series
- Jericho (2006 TV series), a post-apocalyptic drama television series
- Jericho (2016 TV series), a drama set in 1870s Yorkshire Dales
- "Jericho" (Titans episode)
- Jericho, a fictional terrorist organization in FlashForward
- Jericho, a sock puppet used by Cyril O'Reilly in Oz
- Jericho Turner, a main character in the 2019–2023 TV series Servant
  - "Jericho", an episode of the TV series Servant

== Music ==
=== Artists ===
- Jericho (band), from Israel
- Jericho (rapper) (born 1980), hip-hop recording artist from Namibia
- Jericho, a musical project of Mark Salling

=== Albums ===
- Jericho (Last in Line album), 2023
- Jericho (The Band album), 1993
- Jericho (Prism album), 1993

=== Songs ===
- "Jericho", a 1974 song by Joni Mitchell from Miles of Aisles
- "Jericho", a 1986 song by Simply Red from Picture Book
- "Fire/Jericho" a 1992 song by the Prodigy from Prodigy
- "Jericho", a 1995 song by Arena from Songs from the Lion's Cage
- "Jericho", a 2002 song on Pursuit of Happiness by Weekend Players
- "Jericho", a 2004 song by Hilary Duff from Hilary Duff
- "Jericho", a 2015 song by Celldweller from End of an Empire
- "Jericho", a 2023 song by Iniko from The Awakening
- "Jericho" (Andrew Ripp song), 2020
- "Jericho", a song by electronic music band The Prodigy on Fire/Jericho

== Literature ==
- Jericho (DC Comics), comic book character
- Koenma or Jericho, manga character from YuYu Hakusho; see list of YuYu Hakusho characters
- Jericho, comic book character in Exciting X-Patrol; see list of Amalgam Comics characters
- Jericho, a novel by Dirk Bogarde
- Jericho Books, an imprint of Hachette Book Group

== Video games ==
- Clive Barker's Jericho, horror-themed video game released in 2007
- Jericho Cross, video game character in Darkwatch
- Jericho, video game character in Fallout 3
- Jericho, fictional place in Detroit: Become Human

== Military ==
- Battle of Jericho, an incident in the biblical Book of Joshua
- Jericho (missile), a ballistic missile (rocket) produced by Israel
- Jericho 941, a handgun also known as the IMI Jericho and IWI Jericho, produced by Israel Weapons
- Operation Jericho, a World War II mission

== Schools ==
- Jericho High School, New York, United States
- Jericho School, a historic one-room school building in Caroline County, Virginia

== People ==
- Jericho (given name)
- Luke Jericho (born 1984), Australian rules footballer
- Chris Jericho, ring name of Christopher Irvine (born 1970), professional wrestler and lead singer of the band Fozzy

== Other uses ==
- Jericho (play), 2011, by American playwright Jack Canfora
- Jericho Diamond Mine, Nunavut, Canada
- Jericho Forum, an information and communications technology security forum
- Jericho, a lion, companion to Cecil

== See also ==
- Ariha (disambiguation)
- Géricault (1791–1824), French painter
- Jericó (disambiguation)
- Jerichow, a town in Saxony-Anhalt, Germany
- Jerricho, a name
- Walls of Jericho (disambiguation)
