= Islam in Virginia =

Islam religion in Virginia, US

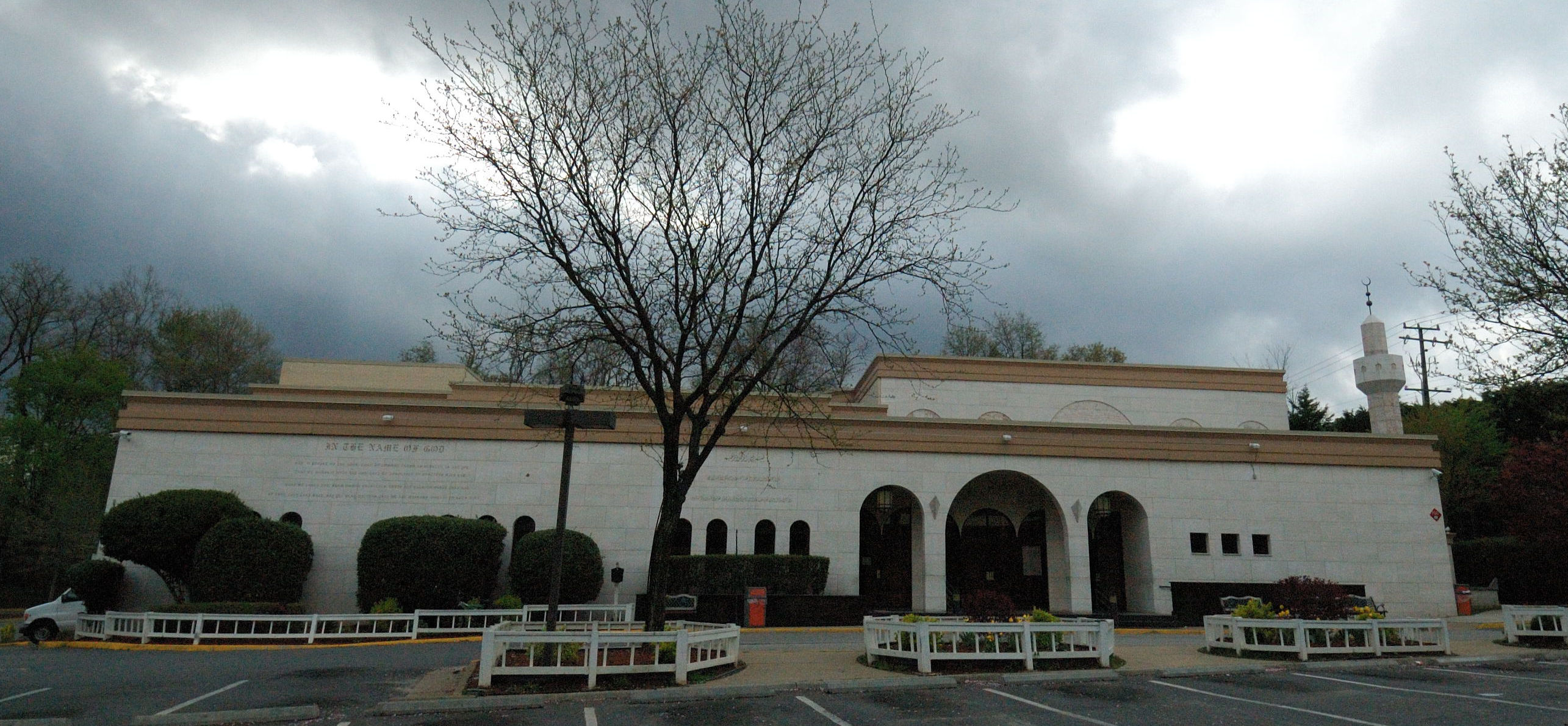
Dar Al-Hijrah Islamic Center, Falls Church, Virginia, 2022

There are an estimated 200,000 Muslims in Virginia in the United States as of 2008, according to the American Religious Identification Survey. As of 2014, Virginia has the fourth highest Islamic population concentration in the United States.

== History ==
=== 18th and 19th centuries ===
In the 1760s, future Governor of Virginia and U.S. President Thomas Jefferson purchased an English translation of the Quran while studying law. At the time, Muslims were alluded to in Virginia as "Mahometans," and while an estimated 20 percent of enslaved Africans were Muslim, much of Virginia's citizenry at the time did not acknowledge that Muslims existed in America.

Three years after the end of the Revolutionary War, Thomas Jefferson's 1779 "Bill for Establishing Religious Freedom", was passed by the Virginia General Assembly and became law in 1786. The new law guaranteed freedom of religion to people of all religious faiths, including Muslims.

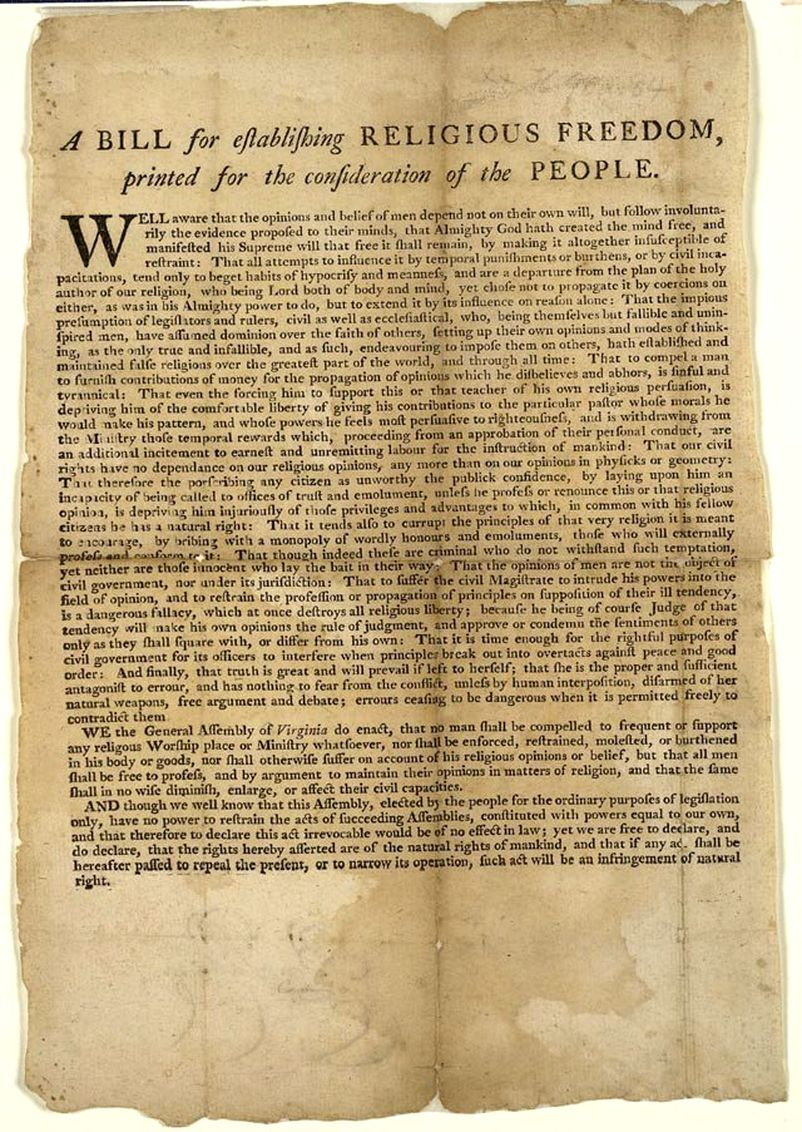
Thomas Jefferson's 1779 "Bill for Establishing Religious Freedom"

Virginia was one of the first states to formally recognize Muslims. Historian Peter Manseau wrote:

Muslims' presence [in the United States] is affirmed in documents dated more than a century before religious liberty became the law of the land, as in a Virginia statute of 1682 which referred to "negroes, moores, molatoes, and others, born of and in heathenish, idolatrous, pagan, and Mahometan parentage and country" who "heretofore and hereafter may be purchased, procured, or otherwise obtained, as slaves."

Virginia resident and first U.S. President George Washington suggested for Muslims to "obtain proper relief" from a proposed Virginia bill that would levy taxes to subsidize Christian worship in the state. On another occasion, Washington declared that he would welcome "Mohometans" to his Virginia Mount Vernon estate if they were "good workmen." Research indicates that some of Mount Vernon's enslaved workers in Virginia were practicing Muslims and adhered to Islamic tradition.

While President, Thomas Jefferson also participated in an iftar with the Ambassador of Tunisia at his Virginia Monticello Estate in 1809.

=== 20th century ===
Beginning in the 20th century, Muslims have been a rapidly growing religious group throughout the state through immigration and remain a "major driver of Virginia's religious diversity." By the 1950s, some Muslims in Virginia became affiliated with the Nation of Islam, a Black-oriented form of Islam.

Virginia has had many Muslim service members and veterans. By the 1970s, a cohort of the first Muslim cadets graduated from the Virginia Military Institute. In the late 1970s, U.S. Marine Douglas Burpee was accepted into the Officers Candidates' School in Quantico, Virginia. By the end of his military service, Colonel Burpee was the highest-ranking Muslim in the U.S. Marine Corps.

In 1992, Sharifa Alkhateeb founded the North American Council for Muslim Women in Fairfax, Virginia, and served as its first president. The organization was the first national organization of American Muslim women.

The Al Madina School of Richmond opened in 1998. A private school in Chesterfield County, Virginia, it is the only Islamic school in the Richmond area.

In 1998, there was widely publicized controversy over a proposal from the Saudi Government to build the Islamic Saudi Academy in Ashburn, Virginia. The Loudon County Board of Supervisors eventually voted 7–2 to approve the construction of the school. The original academy closed in June 2016, and the new King Abdullah Academy near Herndon opened in the Fall of 2016.

=== 21st century ===
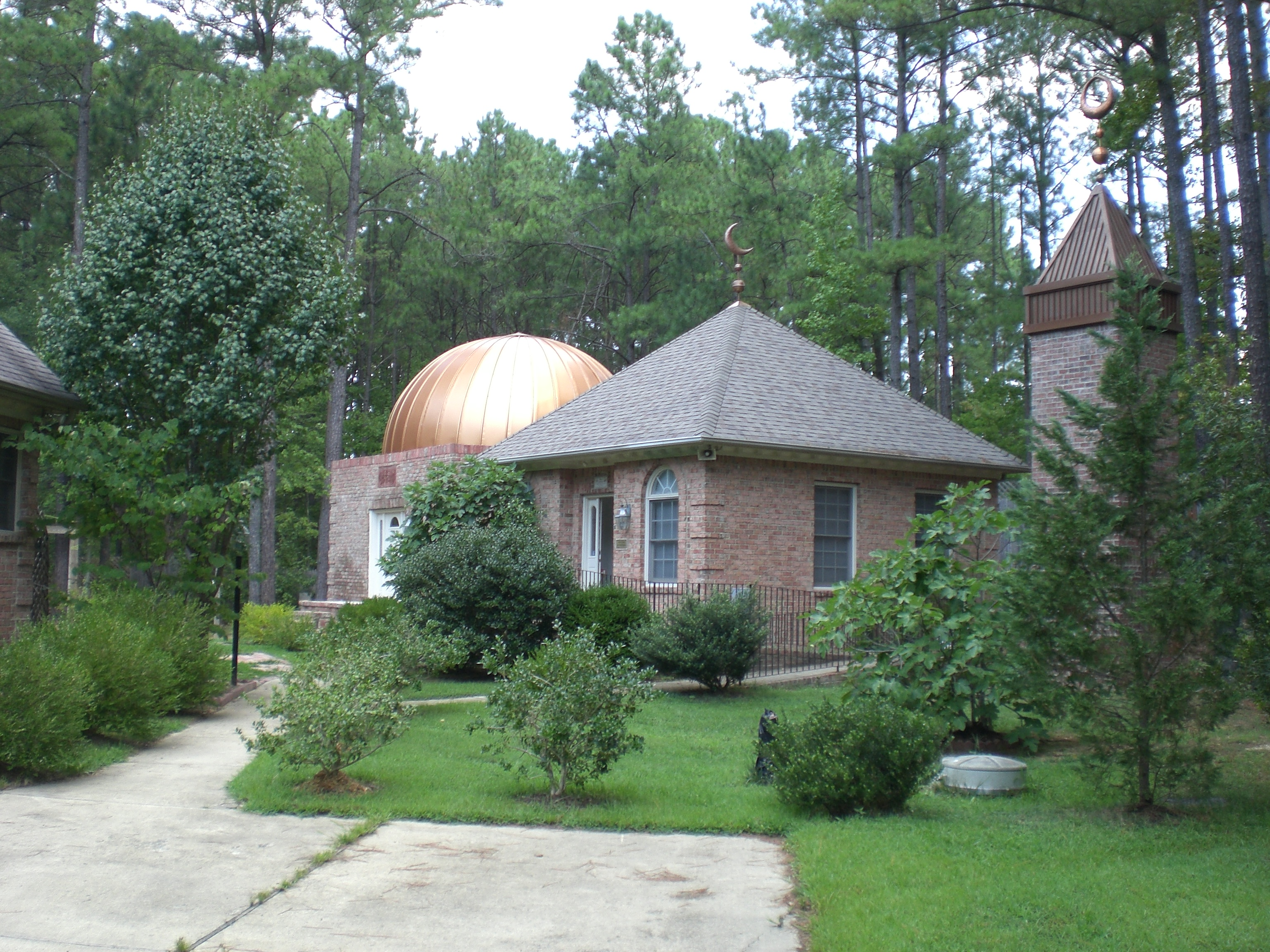
Masjid Abdul Aziz Islamic Center in Williamsburg, Virginia, 2010 (now defunct).

A live Quran reading at West End Islamic Center, Virginia, USA in 2025

As of the 2000s, Virginia is home to an estimated 200,000 Muslims, the majority of whom are concentrated in Northern Virginia and the Washington metropolitan area. Virginia is home to numerous Islamic centers, private schools (preschool, elementary, middle, high school), and mosques throughout the state.

In 2000, The Peaceful Families Project was established in Northern Virginia and is among the first Muslim organizations working to end domestic violence in Muslim families and communities.

In 2004, federal agents raided the Alexandria, Virginia satellite office of the World Assembly of Muslim Youth, long suspected of terrorism by the Federal Bureau of Investigation. After the raid, the organization strongly denied any ties to terrorism and stated that the government had told them the probe was focused solely on "immigration issues". The office was later permanently closed by order of the U.S. government.

In 2004, University of Virginia graduate Humayun Khan of the U.S. Army's 201st Forward Support Battalion, 1st Infantry Division was killed by a car bomb, saving the lives of his fellow soldiers. Khan's parents, Khizr and Ghazala Khan of Charlottesville, Virginia, later gained wide public recognition as a Muslim Gold Star family as they publicly addressed the immigration policies of President Donald Trump at the Democratic National Convention in 2016.

In 2007, the Islamic Center of Richmond was established as a 501c(3) non-profit organization with a mission to "organize religious, educational, and charitable activities for the benefit of the Muslim community in Virginia."

By percentage of the total population of counties or independent cities, Emporia, Virginia was reporting having the highest population of Muslims in the United States as of the 2010 census, with 28.99% of city residents being practicing Muslims.

The University of Virginia also has an Islamic studies program within its Department of Religious Studies, which is focused on "the advanced study of Islamic intellectual history spanning fifteen-hundred years, with an emphasis on the medieval and early modern philosophical and religious traditions."

In 2014, Sam Rasoul was elected as the first Muslim member of the Virginia General Assembly, representing District 11 in the Virginia House of Delegates.

The 2017 murder of Nabra Hassanen brought concerns regarding islamophobia in Virginia to the forefront, with many asserting it to be an anti-Muslim hate crime. Fairfax County police chief Edwin Roessler Jr. told the media that they had "absolutely no evidence" that the killing of Hassanen was a hate crime, but members of Hassanen's community have questioned this conclusion.

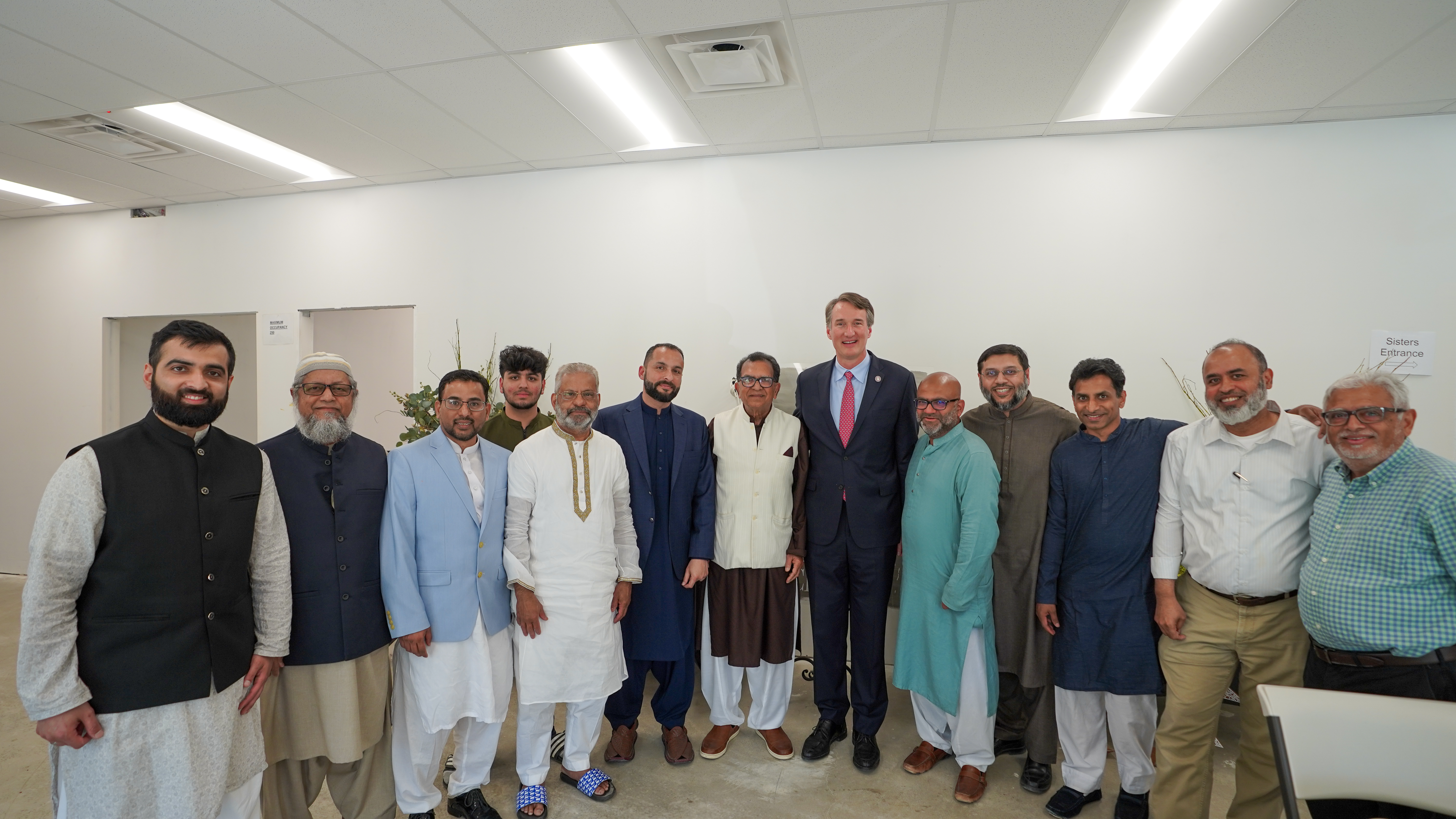
Governor of Virginia Glenn Youngkin with members of the West End Islamic Center, Richmond, Virginia, 2022

In the 2019 Virginia Senate election, Ghazala Hashmi was elected to represent Virginia's 10th Senate district, defeating incumbent Glen Sturtevant. She became the first Muslim elected to the Senate of Virginia. She was sworn into office on January 8, 2020. In the same election, Ibraheem Samirah was elected to the Virginia House of Delegates, becoming its second Muslim member.

In June 2020, Qasim Rashid was the first Muslim ever to win a congressional primary in Virginia, becoming the Democratic nominee for Virginia's 1st congressional district in the 2020 election.

In 2022, Governor of Virginia Glenn Youngkin visited a vandalized mosque on Eid al-Fitr to condemn anti-Muslim acts of violence and commit to partnership and further religious tolerance. He stated, "this is a moment for us to recognize across Virginia... that there is no place for religious persecution, there is no place for us to condemn people because of their faith. America was in fact founded on a basic principle of being able to express your religious beliefs."

== Mosques in Virginia ==
- All Dulles Area Muslim Society, mosque in Sterling, Virginia (second largest mosque community in the United States)
- Baitul Mukkaram Masjid, mosque in Arlington County, Virginia
- Dar Al-Hijrah, mosque in Fairfax County, Virginia
- Dar Ul-Ghuraba, mosque in Emporia, Virginia
- HAWA Center, mosque in Fair Lakes, Virginia
- Islamic Center-Northern Virginia, mosque in Fairfax, Virginia
- Islamic Society of Greater Richmond, mosque in Richmond, Virginia
- Islamic Society of Virginia, mosque in Charlottesville, Virginia
- Imam Ali Center, mosque in Springfield, Virginia
- Madina Islamic Center, mosque in Williamsburg, Virginia
- Masjid Al-Ihsan, mosque in Blacksburg, Virginia
- Masjid An Nur Islamic Center, mosque in Roanoke, Virginia
- Masjid Anwaar, mosque in Richmond, Virginia
- Masjid Ar-Rahman, mosque in Richmond, Virginia
- Masjid Bilal, mosque in Richmond, Virginia
- Masjidullah Islamic Center, mosque in Richmond, Virginia
- Masjid Umm Barakah, mosque in Richmond, Virginia
- Masjid Masroor, mosque in Manassas, Virginia
- McLean Islamic Center, mosque in McLean, Virginia
- Mosque & Islamic Center of Hampton Roads, mosque in Hampton Roads, Virginia
- Mubarak Mosque, mosque in Chantilly, Virginia
- Mustafa Center, mosque in Annandale, Virginia
- Qureshi Masjid, mosque in Alexandria, Virginia
- Shah-E-Najaf Islamic Center, mosque in Alexandria, Virginia
- Suleymaniye Center, mosque and education center in Annandale, Virginia
- Uyghur Islamic Center - Fairfax, mosque in Fairfax, Virginia
- Uyghur Islamic Center - Chantilly, mosque and community center in Chantilly, Virginia
- Virginia Islamic Center, mosque in Alexandria, Virginia
- West End Islamic Center, mosque and community center in Glen Allen, Virginia
