= Riha =

Riha or Ariha or RIHA may refer to:

== Places ==
- Urfa, a city in southeastern Turkey, known in Kurdish as Riha
- Jericho, a city in the West Bank, known in Arabic as Riha or ʼArīḥā
- Ariha, or Riha, a town in Syria
- Riha, Manipur, a village in India

== Other uses ==
- Riha (garment), an Assamese traditional garment
- Říha, a Czech surname
- Karl Riha (1935–2026), German poet, writer and literary scholar
- International Association of Research Institutes in the History of Art, or RIHA
- Administration system for the state information system RIHA, Estonian catalogue of public sector information systems
- RIHA, a Dutch electronic organ builder, for instance of the Riha Adagio
