= Canfora =

Canfora is a family name of Italian origin. It may refer to:

- Alan Canfora, American anti–Vietnam War activist
- Bruno Canfora (1924–2017), Italian composer, conductor and music arranger
- Jack Canfora (born 1969), American playwright, actor, musician and teacher
- Jason La Canfora (born 1974), American sports writer and television analyst
- Luciano Canfora (born 1942), Italian classicist and historian
