= 1987 African U-16 Qualifying for World Cup =

Tournament details
- Teams: 18 (from 1 confederation)

Final positions
- Champions: Ivory Coast; Egypt; Nigeria

The 1987 African U-16 Qualifying for World Cup was a qualifying edition organized by the Confederation of African Football (CAF) into the FIFA U-16 World Championship. The three winners qualified for the 1987 FIFA U-16 World Championship.

== First round ==
The Côte d'Ivoire-Togo matches were played on 22 June 1986 and 5 July 1986. The winners advanced to the Second Round.

Team 1	Agg.	Team 2	1st leg	2nd leg
Ivory Coast	2–2 (4–3 p)	Togo	1–1	1–1
Lesotho	w/o	Mauritius	–	–
Ethiopia	w/o	Sudan	–	–
Cameroon	w/o	Gabon	–	–
Ghana	w/o	Benin	–	–
Liberia	w/o	Gambia	–	–

22 June 1986

Ivory Coast	1–1	Togo

5 July 1986

Togo	1–1	Ivory Coast
Penalties
	3–4

Ivory Coast qualified on penalties 4–3 after a draw of 2–2 on aggregate.

Lesotho	w/o	Mauritius

Lesotho qualified after the withdrawal of Mauritius.

Ethiopia	w/o	Sudan

Ethiopia qualified after the withdrawal of Sudan.

Cameroon	w/o	Gabon

Cameroon qualified after the withdrawal of Gabon.

Ghana	w/o	Benin

Ghana qualified after the withdrawal of Benin.

Liberia	w/o	Gambia

Liberia qualified after the withdrawal of Gambia.

== Second round ==
The first leg matches were played on either 9 or 10 August 1986. The second leg matches were played on 22, 23 or 24 August 1986. The Liberia vs Guinea matches were played on 1 and 15 November 1986. The winners advanced to the Third Round.

Team 1	Agg.	Team 2	1st leg	2nd leg
Ghana	1–1 (a)	Nigeria	1–1	0–0
Tunisia	0–1	Algeria	0–1	0–0
Ivory Coast	3–3 (a)	Cameroon	2–0	1–3
Liberia	1–2	Guinea	1–1	0–1
Egypt	w/o	Ethiopia	3–0	w/o
Zambia	w/o	Lesotho	–	–

10 August 1986

Ghana	1−1	Nigeria

23 August 1986

Nigeria	0−0	Ghana

Nigeria advanced on away goal after 1−1 on aggregate.

9 August 1986

Tunisia	0−1	Algeria

22 August 1986

Algeria	0−0	Tunisia

Algeria advanced after 1−0 on aggregate.

9 August 1986

Ivory Coast	2−0	Cameroon

24 August 1986

Cameroon	3−1	Ivory Coast

Ivory Coast advanced on away goal after 3−3 on aggregate.

1 November 1986

Liberia	1−1	Guinea

15 November 1986

Guinea	1−0	Liberia

Guinea advanced after 2−1 on aggregate.

Egypt	3−0	Ethiopia

Ethiopia	w/o	Egypt

Egypt qualified after the withdrawal of Ethiopia in the second leg.

Zambia	w/o	Lesotho

Zambia qualified after the withdrawal of Lesotho.

== Third round ==
The first leg matches were played on either the 2nd or 4 January 1987. The second leg matches were played on either the 16th or 18 January 1987. The winners qualified for the 1987 FIFA U-16 World Championship.

Team 1	Agg.	Team 2	1st leg	2nd leg
Egypt	2–1	Algeria	0–0	2–1
Guinea	1–3	Ivory Coast	1–0	0–3
Nigeria	w/o	Zambia	–	–

2 January 1987

Egypt	0−0	Algeria

Arab Contractors Stadium, Cairo
Referee: Peter Wanyama (Kenya)
16 January 1987

Algeria	1−2	Egypt

Algiers

Egypt qualified after 2−1 on aggregate.

4 January 1987

Guinea	1−0	Ivory Coast

18 January 1987

Ivory Coast	3−0	Guinea

Ivory Coast qualified after 3−1 on aggregate.

Nigeria	w/o	Zambia

Nigeria qualified after the withdrawal of Zambia

== Countries to participate in 1987 FIFA U-16 World Championship ==
The following three teams qualified for 1987 FIFA U-16 World Championship.

- Ivory Coast
- Egypt
- Nigeria
