= Říha =

Říha (feminine Říhová) is a Czech surname. Notable people with the surname include:

- Blanka Říhová (born 1942), Czech immunologist
- Bohumil Říha, Czech writer
- František Říha, Czech canoeist
- Jan Říha, Czech footballer
- Jiří Říha, Czech ice hockey player
- Lukáš Říha, Czech ice hockey player
- Martin Josef Říha, Czech Roman Catholic clergyman
- Miloš Říha (1958–2020), Czech ice hockey player and coach

== See also ==
- Karl Riha (1935–2026), Czech-born German poet, writer and literary scholar
