= Prince Martor Jr. =

Liberian footballer (born 2007)

Personal information
- Date of birth: 9 July 2007 (age 19)
- Place of birth: Bensonville, Liberia
- Positions: Forward; winger

Team information
- Current team: Gençlerbirliği
- Number: 45

Youth career
- 2025: Gençlerbirliği

Senior career*
Years	Team	Apps	(Gls)
2022–2023	Global Pharma		
2023–2024	Heaven Eleven		
2024–2025	Black Man Warrior	12	(2)
2025–	Gençlerbirliği	5	(0)

International career^{‡}
2023	Liberia U17	1	(0)
2026–	Liberia	2	(0)
- * Club domestic league appearances and goals as of 23:54, 10 November 2026 (UTC) ‡ National team caps and goals as of 06:14, 19 September 2026 (UTC)

Prince Martor Jr. (born 9 July 2007) is a Liberian professional footballer who plays as a forward and winger for Süper Lig club Gençlerbirliği and the Liberia national team.

== Club career ==
Martor Jr. previously played for Global Pharma and Heaven Eleven in Liberia, before joining Black Man Warrior, where he scored twice in 12 matches during the 2024–25 LFA First Division season. In August 2025, he signed for Turkish club Gençlerbirliği's under-19 team on a one-year contract, with the option of an additional two years. In his first season in Turkey, he scored 15 goals in 28 matches in the U21 Ligi, and made three appearances in the 2025–26 Turkish Cup, including in the fourth round against Sakaryaspor and twice in the group stage.

Martor Jr. made his Süper Lig debut for Gençlerbirliği on 15 August 2026, playing six minutes in a 2–1 win against Fenerbahçe.

== International career ==
Martor Jr. has represented Liberia's under-17 national team. He was first called up for the Liberia national team in November 2025, for a friendly against Guinea. On 31 March 2026, he made his debut in a 2–2 draw with Libya.
