= Thomas Kojo =

Liberian former footballer (born 1972)

Personal information
- Full name: Thomas Kojo
- Date of birth: May 22, 1972 (age 54)
- Place of birth: Monrovia, Liberia
- Position: Defender

Youth career
- Lindsey Wilson College

Senior career*
| Years | Team | Apps | (Gls) |
| 1998 | Black Star | | |
| 1999–2000 | Mighty Barolle | | |
| 2000–2001 | Athinaikos | 11 | (0) |
| 2001 | Tennessee Rhythm | | |
| 2001–2002 | Minnesota Thunder | | |
| 2002–2003 | Maritzburg United | | |

International career
- Liberia

Managerial career
- 2008: FC AK (interim)
- 2012: Liberia (interim)
- 2013: Liberia (interim)
- 2018: Liberia
- 2022–2023: Liberia (interim)
- 2023: Liberia (assistant)
- 2025–2026: Liberia
- * Club domestic league appearances and goals as of 13:42, 08 December 2007 (UTC)

Thomas Kojo (born May 22, 1972) is a Liberian former footballer who played as a defender. He recently was the head coach of Liberia national football team.

Kojo attended Lindsey Wilson College where he was a 1996 first team All NAIA soccer player.

Kojo was an assistant coach with FC AK. On July 9, 2008, Kojo was appointed interim coach of FC AK after the surprise resignation of Ali Akan.

In November 2013, Kojo became the interim technical advisor for the national team for the second time, and will be in charge for the 2015 Africa Cup of Nations qualification.

On 9 January 2015, Kojo became technical director at Barrack Young Controllers FC.
