= Jerricho =

Jerricho is a given name and surname. Notable people with the name include:

- Jerricho Cotchery (born 1982), American football player and coach
- Paul Jerricho (born 1948), British actor

== See also ==
- Jericho (disambiguation)
- Jericó (disambiguation)
