= The Murderer Killings =

American true crime parody podcast

The Murderer Killings – A True* Crime Podcast
- Genre: Comedy; Parody; True crime
- Country of origin: United States
- Language: English

Creative team
- Created by: Michael Satow; Jack Canfora
- Written by: Michael Satow, Jack Canfora

Publication
- No. of seasons: 1
- No. of episodes: 10
- Original release: December 2025

The Murderer Killings is an American true crime parody podcast created by Michael Satow and Jack Canfora. The series parodies the true-crime podcast genre and follows fictional podcaster Charlie Incarica as he investigates a series of murders in the small town of Shady Grove. Its first season, comprising 10 episodes, was released in December 2025. In 2026, the podcast won both the Webby Award and the Webby's People's Voice Award in the Scripted Fiction (Limited-Series & Specials) category.

== Production ==
The podcast was created by Michael Satow and Jack Canfora. Satow directed, produced, edited and composed the series, and co-wrote it with Canfora. Satow voices Charlie Incarica, the fictional podcaster at the center of the story, while Canfora portrays Chief Tommy Ebner and Judge Maxwell Edison.

The series is a scripted comedy presented in the format of a serialized true-crime podcast. Its plot follows Incarica as he travels to Shady Grove to investigate a triple homicide connected to the town's prominent pudding-making business. The story uses elements of true-crime reporting, including interviews, suspects, local corruption and the presentation of evidence.

The podcast was distributed through Apple Podcasts and Spotify. Its trailer was released on November 21, 2025, and the first season's episodes followed in December 2025.

== Awards ==
In 2026, the podcast won the Webby Award and the People's Voice Award in the Podcasts: Scripted Fiction (Limited-Series & Specials) category. It also nominated for the Best Fiction Podcast: Comedy award at the 2026 NYC Podcast Awards.
