= Jericó =

Jericó is the Portuguese, Catalan, and Spanish form of Jericho, a city in the West Bank. Jericó or Jerico may also refer to:

== Places and jurisdictions ==
South America

- Jericó, Antioquia, a municipality in the department of Antioquia, Colombia
  - Roman Catholic Diocese of Jericó, with see in the above city
- Jericó, Boyacá, a municipality in the department of Boyacá, Colombia
- Jericó, Paraíba, a municipality in the state of Paraíba, Brazil

North America

- Jerico River, located in the U.S. state of Georgia

== People ==
- Jericó Abramo Masso (born 1975), Mexican politician affiliated with the Institutional Revolutionary Party
- Jerico Nelson (born 1989), American football strong safety

== See also ==
- Jericho (disambiguation)
- Jerricho, name
- Jerico Springs, Missouri, a village in Cedar County, Missouri, United States
