= Walls of Jericho =

The Walls of Jericho usually refer to the destruction of the walls of Jericho in the biblical story of the Battle of Jericho.

Walls of Jericho may also refer to:

- Wall of Jericho (Neolithic), a prehistoric wall around the city of Jericho
- Wrestler Chris Jericho’s signature submission, The Boston Crab, also known as the Walls of Jericho.

== Film and television ==
- The Walls of Jericho (1914 film), an American silent drama film
- The Walls of Jericho (1948 film), an American drama film
- "The Walls of Jericho", an episode of The Time Tunnel
- "Walls of Jericho" (Jericho episode), 2006

== Music ==
- Walls of Jericho (band), an American metalcore band
- "Walls of Jericho", a 1982 song by post-punk band Virgin Prunes
- Walls of Jericho (album), a 1985 album by Helloween
- "Walls of Jericho", a 1990 song by Cabaret Voltaire

== Places ==
- The Walls of Jericho (canyon), a nature reserve in North Alabama and Middle Tennessee
- Wall of Jericho, a mountain in Banff National Park, Alberta, Canada

== Other uses ==
- The Walls of Jericho, a 1928 novel by Rudolph Fisher
- Walls of Jericho, a finishing move of American-Canadian professional wrestler Chris Jericho

== See also ==
- Jericho (disambiguation)
