= Oslov =

- Municipality
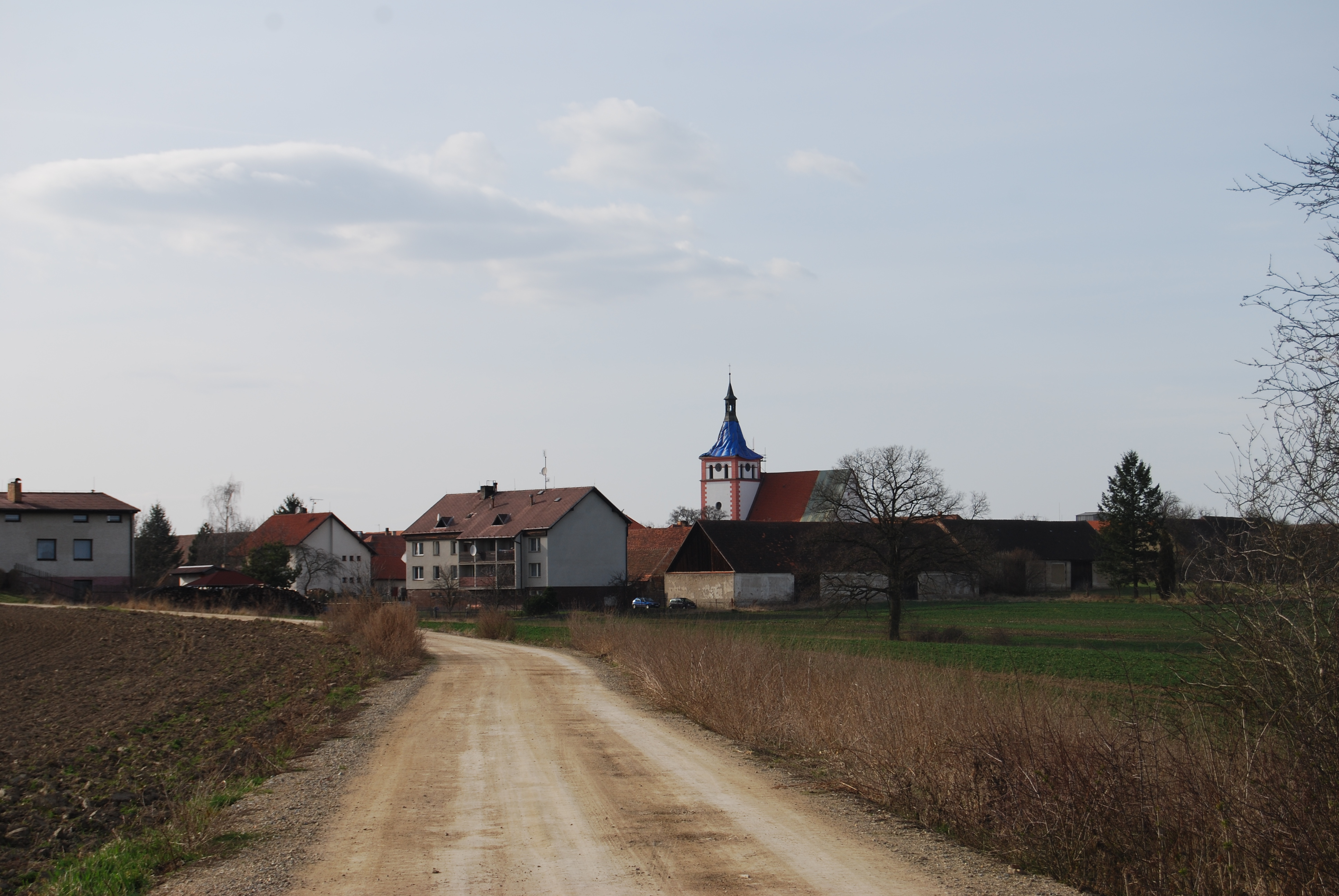
- View from the east

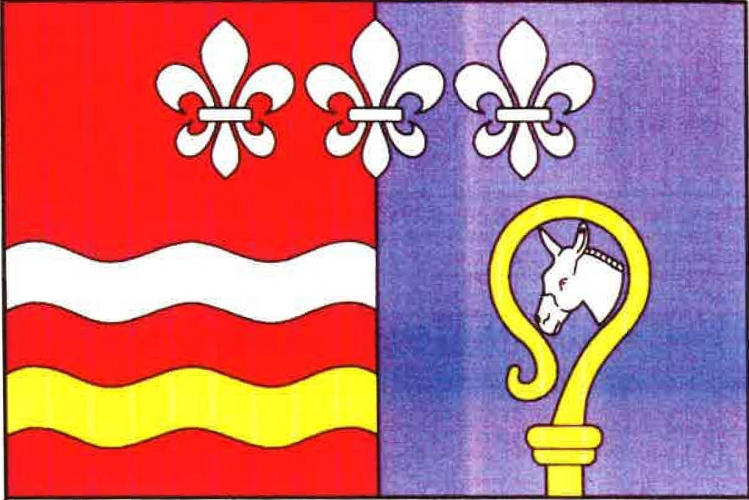
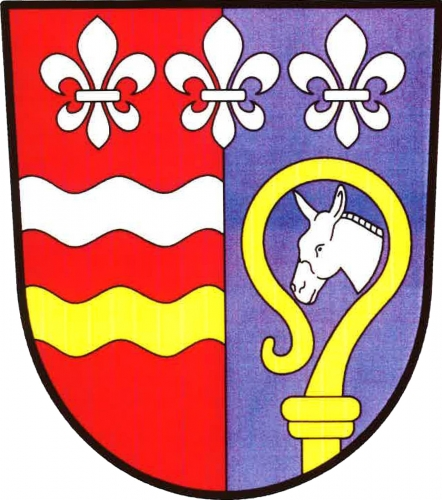
- Flag Coat of arms

- Location in the Czech Republic
- Coordinates: 49°23′58″N 14°12′43″E
- Country: Czech Republic
- Region: South Bohemian
- District: Písek
- First mentioned: 1167

Area
  - Total: 19.40 km^{2} (7.49 sq mi)
- Elevation: 421 m (1,381 ft)

Population (2026-01-01)
  - Total: 344
  - Density: 17.7/km^{2} (45.9/sq mi)
- Time zone: UTC+1 (CET)
  - Summer (DST): UTC+2 (CEST)
- Postal codes: 397 01, 398 35
- Website: www.oslov.cz

Oslov is a municipality and village in Písek District in the South Bohemian Region of the Czech Republic. It has about 300 inhabitants.

== Administrative division ==
Oslov consists of three municipal parts (in brackets population according to the 2021 census):

- Oslov (249)
- Svatá Anna (1)
- Tukleky (75)

== Etymology ==
The village was named after its founder, who was a noble named Osel. Osel literally means 'donkey' in Czech.

== Geography ==
Oslov is located about 11 kilometres (7 mi) north of Písek and 50 km (31 mi) north of České Budějovice. It lies in the Tábor Uplands. The highest point is at 435 m (1,427 ft) above sea level. The municipality is situated on an elevated plateau between the Vltava and Otava rivers, on the shores of the Orlík Reservoir, which is built on both of these rivers. The confluence of the Otava and Lomnice is located on the western municipal border.

== History ==
The first written mention of Oslov is from 1167, when the village was donated to the convent in Doksany. Later it belonged to the Zvíkov estate.

== Demographics ==
Historical population

| Year | Pop. | ±% |
|---|---|---|
| 1869 | 1,511 | — |
| 1880 | 1,459 | −3.4% |
| 1890 | 1,361 | −6.7% |
| 1900 | 1,192 | −12.4% |
| 1910 | 1,049 | −12.0% |

| Year | Pop. | ±% |
|---|---|---|
| 1921 | 1,044 | −0.5% |
| 1930 | 903 | −13.5% |
| 1950 | 591 | −34.6% |
| 1961 | 580 | −1.9% |
| 1970 | 485 | −16.4% |

| Year | Pop. | ±% |
|---|---|---|
| 1980 | 311 | −35.9% |
| 1991 | 228 | −26.7% |
| 2001 | 176 | −22.8% |
| 2011 | 187 | +6.2% |
| 2021 | 192 | +2.7% |

Source: Censuses

== Transport ==
The railway from Písek to Milevsko passes through the outlying part of the municipal territory, but there is no train station. The municipality is served by the train station in neighbouring Vlastec.

== Sights ==
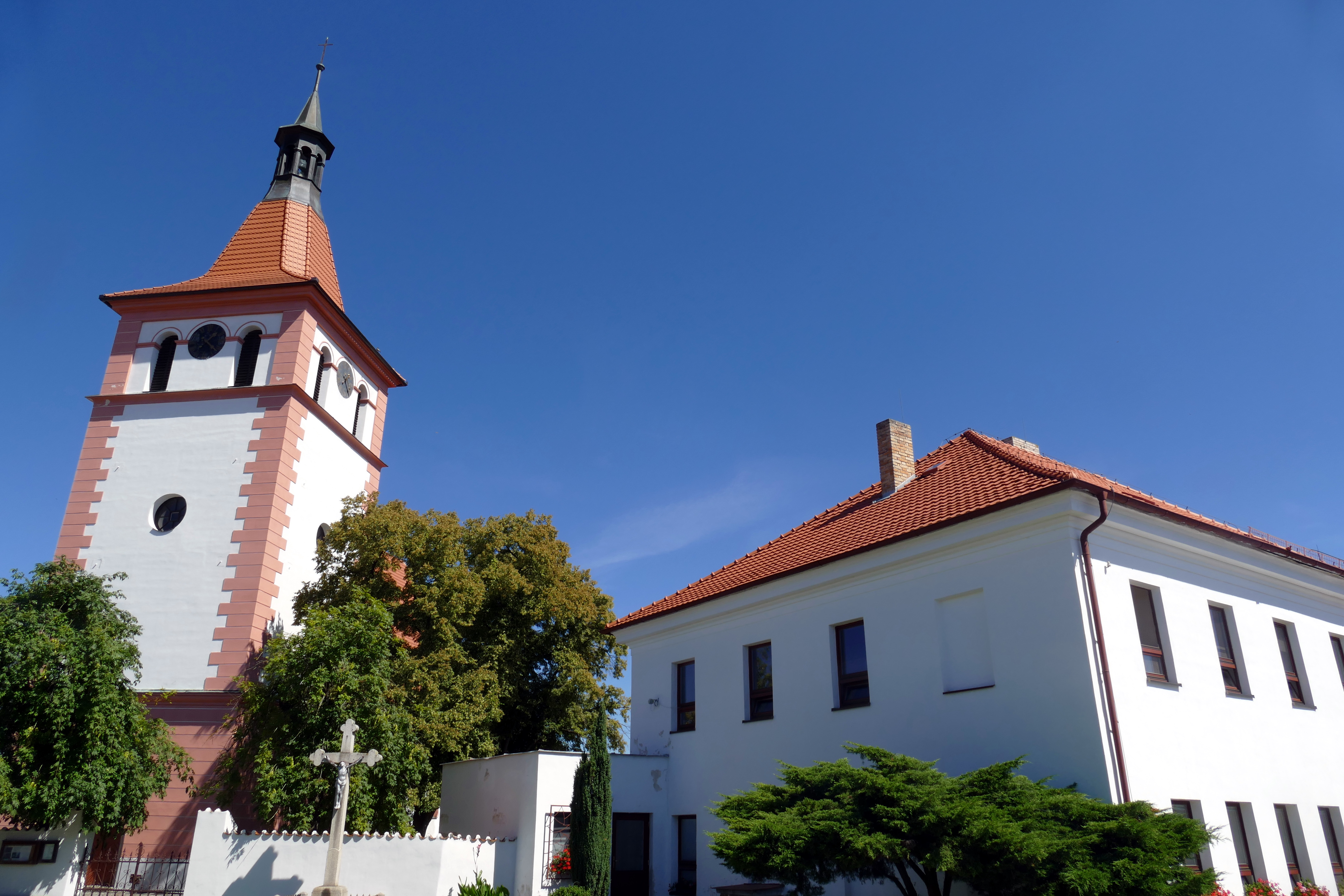
Church of Saint Leonard

The main landmark of Oslov is the Church of Saint Leonard. Originally a Gothic church, it was first documented in 1384. It was completely rebuilt into its current form in 1788.

The Červená Railway Bridge is located on the municipal border. It was built over the Orlík Reservoir in 1886–1889. It is a valuable technical monument.

== Notable people ==
- Martin Josef Říha (1839–1907), Bishop of České Budějovice
