= Armah Vaikainah =

Liberian footballer

Personal information
- Full name: Armah Ayo Vaikainah
- Date of birth: 17 June 1995 (age 31)
- Place of birth: Liberia
- Position: Attacking midfielder

Team information
- Current team: Marsaxlokk

Senior career*
Years	Team	Apps	(Gls)
2018–2020	LISCR FC		
2020–2021	Customs Ladkrabang United	9	(1)
2022–2023	Sirens	14	(0)
2023–	Marsaxlokk	9	(0)

International career^{‡}
2019	Liberia	11	(0)
- * Club domestic league appearances and goals as of 17 November 2024 ‡ National team caps and goals as of 20:04, 13 September 2023 (UTC)

Armah Ayo Vaikainah (born 17 June 1995) is a Liberian professional footballer who plays for Maltese side Marsaxlokk and the Liberia national team.

== Career statistics ==
=== International ===
As of match played 17 November 2024

Appearances and goals by national team and year
National team	Year	Apps	Goals
Liberia	2019	4	0
Liberia	2022	2	0
Liberia	2023	1	0
Liberia	2024	4	0
Total		11	0
