= Kaetu Smith =

Liberian football coach

Managerial career
- Years: Team
- Baccus Marine
- LPRC Oilers
- 2012: Liberia

Kaetu Smith is a Liberian football coach.

== Career ==
During the 1990s, Smith managed Liberian club sides Baccus Marine and LPRC Oilers, before spending much of the 2000s coaching youth teams in the United States. He was appointed as manager of the Liberian national team in May 2012. Smith's appointment was criticised by George Weah, comments which were played down by Smith. Smith and his assistants were sacked in December 2012.
