= Shawky Hussein Mohmoud =

Egyptian former football coach

Personal information
- Full name: Shawky Hussein Mohmoud Shehab El Din
- Place of birth: Egypt

Managerial career
- Years: Team
- 2006: Liberia

Shawky Hussein Mohmoud is an Egyptian former football coach who last managed the Liberia national football team in 2006.

== Liberia ==
Originally taking charge of the Liberia national team under a four-year contract in February 2006 through an agreement between the Liberian and Egyptian governments, Mohmoud relinquished his role as head coach just four months later, citing "poor facilities" among other causes as the reasons for his resignation. He was also not provided a car by the local FA.
