= Jericho (given name) =

Jericho is a masculine given name originating from the city of Jericho. Because of its biblical associations, it is often given by parents of Christian faith.

== People ==
- Jericho Brown (born 1976), American poet and writer
- Jerricho Cotchery (born 1982), American National Football League player and coach
- Jericho Cruz (born 1990), Philippine Basketball Association player
- Jericho Gawanab (born 1980), Namibian rapper and songwriter known mononymously as "Jericho"
- Jericho Nograles (born 1981), Filipino politician
- Jericho Petilla (born 1963), Filipino politician, management engineer, and businessman
- Jericho Rosales (born 1979), Filipino actor
- Jericho Shinde (born 1959), Zimbabwean football coach and former player
- Jericho Sims (born 1998), American National Basketball Association player
- Jericho Vincent (born 1982), American author and public speaker
- Frank Jericho Nagbe (born 1958), Liberian football manager and former professional player

== Fictional characters ==
- Jericho Drumm, Marvel Comics superhero as "Brother Voodoo" and "Doctor Voodoo"
