= Sharifa Alkhateeb =

American Muslim journalist and editor

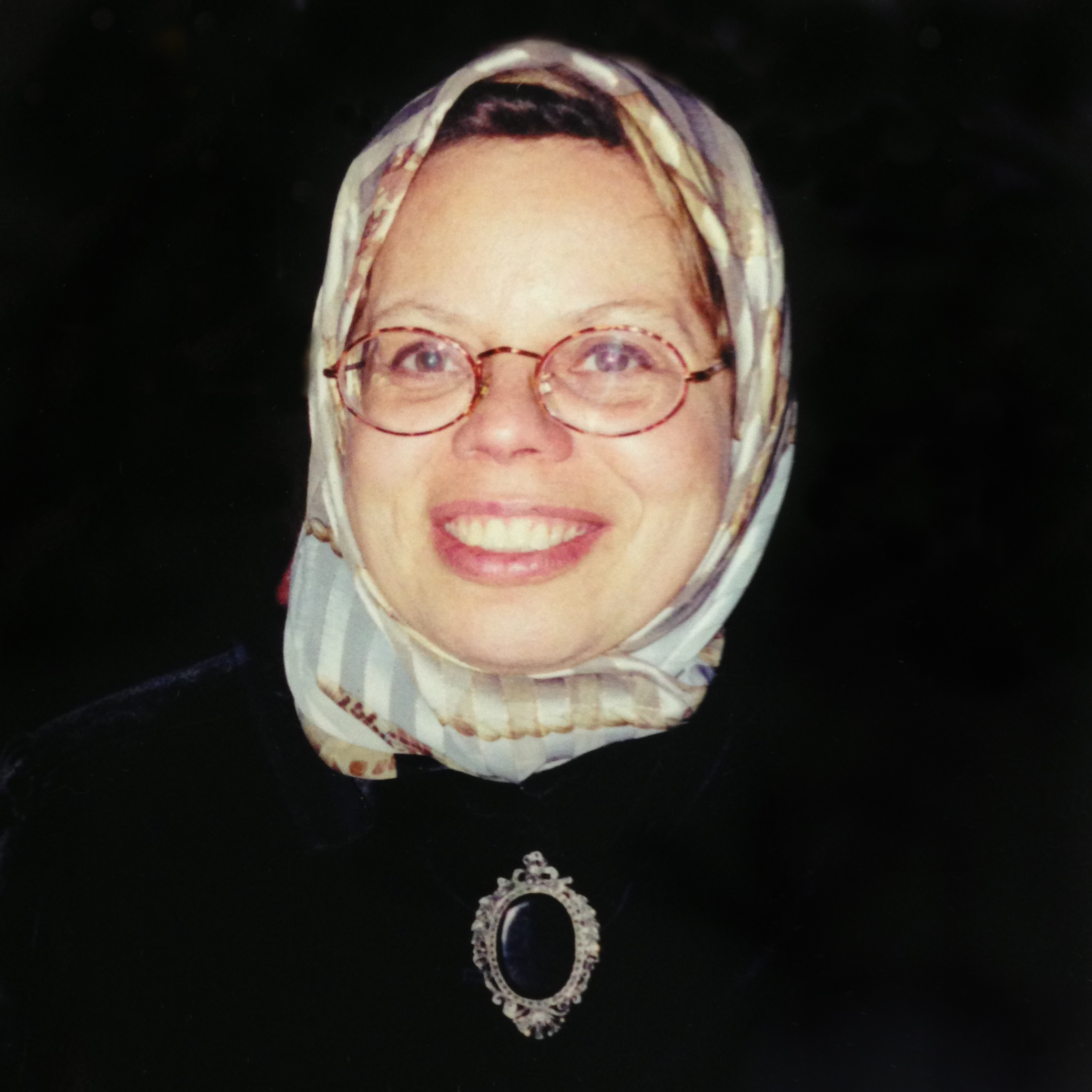
- Born: Thereffia Tahia Ahmad Bey; June 6, 1946; Philadelphia, Pennsylvania
- Died: October 21, 2004 (aged 58); Ashburn, Virginia
- Occupations: Teacher, writer
- Spouse: Mejdi Alkhateeb
- Children: Layla, Maha, Nasreen

Sharifa Tahiya Alkhateeb (born Thereffia Tahia Ahmad Bey; June 6, 1946 – October 21, 2004) was an American writer, researcher and teacher on cultural communication and community building for Islam and Muslims in the United States. She was involved in feminist causes, domestic violence prevention, as well as interfaith and educational organizations. She founded the first nationwide organization for Muslim women in the US and was the first woman to receive the Community Service Award from the Islamic Society of North America.

== Biography ==
Alkhateeb was born on June 6, 1946, in Philadelphia, Pennsylvania. Her father was Hajji Abdullah Ahmad Bey (1920-2006), born Wayland Frantz Dunaway in Baltimore, of African-American descent who worked for the National Youth Administration. In 1943, he married her mother, Anna Louise (née Folker Jordan; 1919-1961) in Wilmington, Delaware, of partial Czech Catholic descent. Anna's maternal grandparents were born in Jetětice and Chabeřice.

After finishing high school, Alkhateeb continued her education, receiving her B.A. in English Literature from the University of Pennsylvania. During her time at the University of Pennsylvania, she joined the feminist movement of the 1960s, never feeling that there was a conflict between her religious convictions and feminism. After completion of her undergraduate degree, she earned her master's in comparative religion from Norwich University, in Northfield, Vermont, and in 1977, edited a translation of the Quran published by Marmaduke Pickthall.

Between 1978 and 1987, Alkhateeb and her husband, Mejdi Alkhateeb, lived in Saudi Arabia, where she worked as a journalist for the Saudi Gazette and taught at both a Saudi university and in private schools. In 1988, the couple returned to the United States, locating in northern Virginia, and Alkhateeb worked as a diversity consultant with the Fairfax County Public Schools in Fairfax, Virginia, producing a television program called "Middle Eastern Parenting", which aired from 1993 to 1997. In the early 1990s, she became managing editor of the American Journal of Islamic Social Sciences (AJISS) and she co-wrote the Arab World Notebook, a social studies text used throughout the public school system in the United States. From 1989 until her death, Alkhateeb served as president of the Muslim Education Council, a regional organization focused on teaching administrators about Islamic culture.

In 1992, she founded the North American Council for Muslim Women (NACMW) and served as its first president. NACMW was the first national organization of American Muslim women. She followed up with the establishment of a consultative database for organizations addressing the needs of Muslim women and created the first crisis hotline for them. In 1995, Alkhateeb served as Chair of the Muslim Caucus at the Fourth World Conference on Women convened by the United Nations in Beijing, China. In 1998, she established the Peaceful Families Project in conjunction with the Department of Justice, to analyze violence in the Muslim community. The resulting survey, was the first nationwide inquiry on domestic violence within the community.

After the attacks of 9/11, Alkhateeb coordinated efforts of an "interfaith consortium of synagogues, churches and mosques to facilitate dialogues and understanding". She became the Middle Eastern/Muslim Team Leader for the Community Resilience Project, which was funded by Federal Emergency Management Agency (FEMA), as a crisis counseling center in Northern Virginia after the attacks. In September 2004, she received the Community Service Award from the Islamic Society of North America, becoming the first woman to ever receive the honor. One month later, on October 21, 2004, she died of cancer of the pancreas at her home in Ashburn, Virginia.

Since her death, several efforts have continued to honor her legacy. Among these are the Peaceful Families Project, the Sharifa Alkhateeb Community Service Award given annually by the MAS Freedom Foundation, and the Sharifa Alkhateeb Memorial Scholarship of Fairfax County Public Schools.
