= Červená Railway Bridge =

Coordinates: 49°22′53″N 14°15′10″E

- Červenský železniční most (Czech)
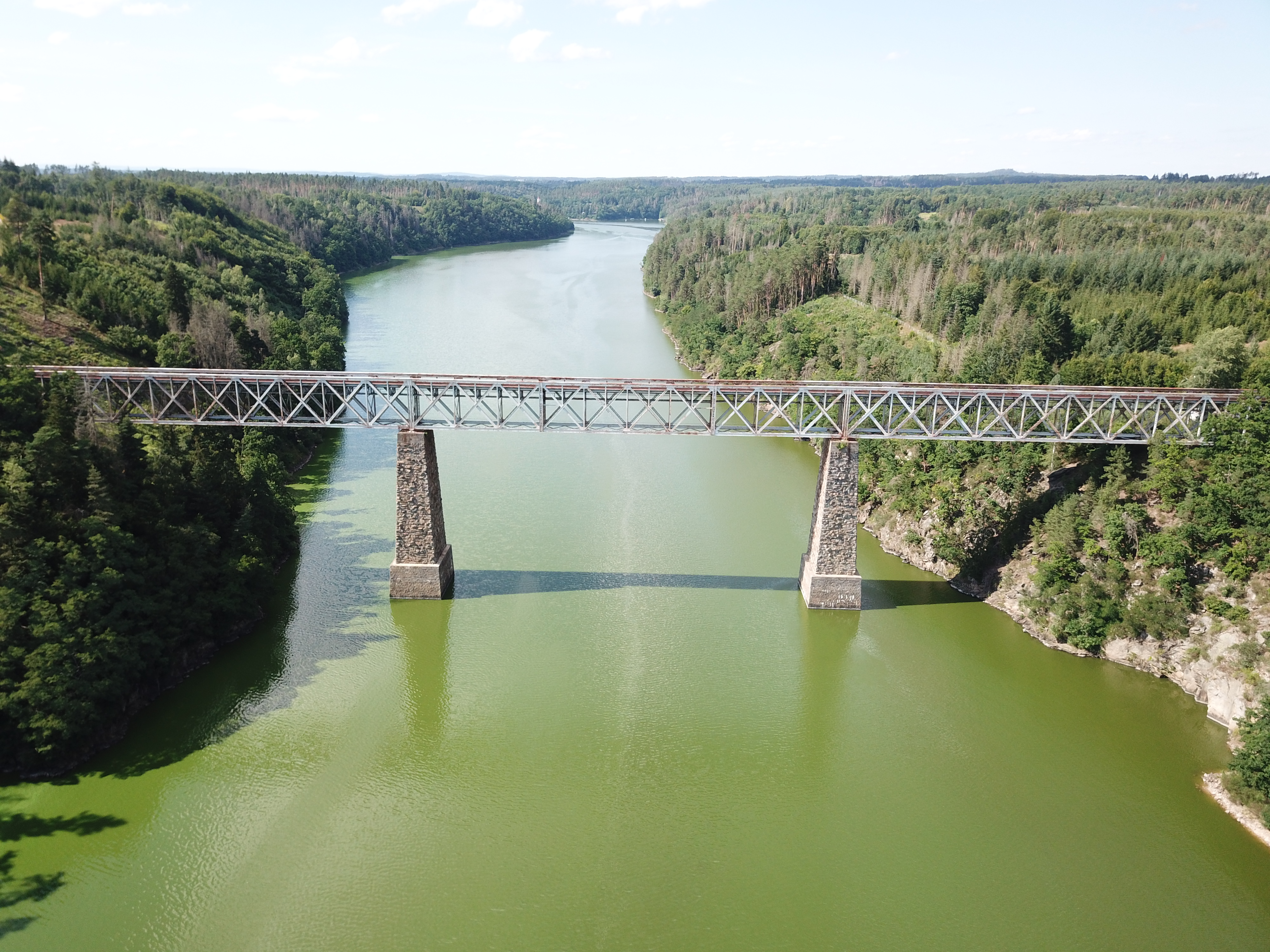
- View from the south
- Interactive map of Červená Railway Bridge
- Type: railway bridge
- Location: rail line between Tábor and Písek

History
- Built: 1886

Site notes
- Height: 65 metres (213 ft) above the river
- Area: Oslov and Jetětice, Czech Republic
- Architect: Meltzer and Hüsse

The Červená Railway Bridge (Czech: Červenský železniční most) is a railway bridge in the Czech Republic, located on the rail line between Tábor and Písek, over the Orlík Reservoir. It was declared a cultural monument of the Czech Republic in 2021.

== History ==
The bridge was built in 1886–1889 from steel from the First Czech-Moravian Machine Factory, the largest producer of steel structures in Bohemia at the time. Designed by the engineers Meltzer and Hüsse, it opened on 20 November 1889. It was built without scaffolding, using the balanced cantilever method, first railway bridge in the area built using this method. During its construction, it became the second highest bridge in all of Austria-Hungary.

The bridge was the subject of a CIA study in 1950, noting that it was of local strategic importance only. According to the report, the bridge is 500 m long (noting that this length seems exaggerated), with a height of 65–70 m above the river.

Since 2021, it has been a cultural monument of the Czech Republic, with the designation noting: "The railway steel lattice bridge, built at the end of the 1880s near the settlement of Červená, is a unique technical structure of extraordinary importance not only in terms of its dimensions, but also in its static arrangement and method of flying assembly. At the end of the 19th century, it was the very first railway bridge in our country, built without scaffolding by fly assembly, which was a revolutionary innovation in construction. (...)"

== Technical details ==
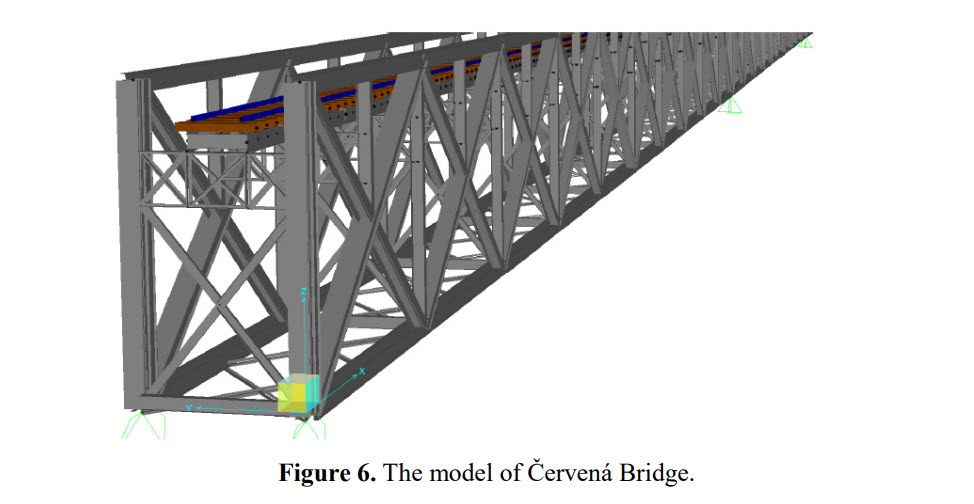
Cross-section of the rail deck

The structure is a three-span, truss girder bridge with an immediate bridge deck without a ballast platform, built in 1886 using the balanced cantilever method.

The bridge is 254.2 metres (834 ft) long with three main spans of 84.4 metres (277 ft), the load-bearing structure is formed by two truss girders with overall height of 9.9 metres (32 ft) and system of cross and longitudinal beams supporting the intermediate bridge deck. A rail expansion device is installed on both ends.
