= Ansu Keita =

Liberian football coach

Personal information
- Date of birth: 30 June 1960 (age 66)

Managerial career
- Years: Team
- Liberia U17
- 2022: Liberia (caretaker)
- 2023: Liberia

Ansumana Keita (born 30 June 1960) is a Liberian football coach.

== Family ==
His son, Samsy Keita, is a professional football goalkeeper with CF Montreal of Major League Soccer.

== Career ==
Keita was manager of the Liberia under-17 team.

Keita took temporary charge of the Liberia national team for two matches of the 2022 African Nations Championship qualification, before being appointed permanently to the role in January 2023.

In November 2023 he received death threats and was absent from games. He was sacked in December 2023.
