= Jericho Historic District =

Historic district in New York, United States

- U.S. National Register of Historic Places
- U.S. Historic district
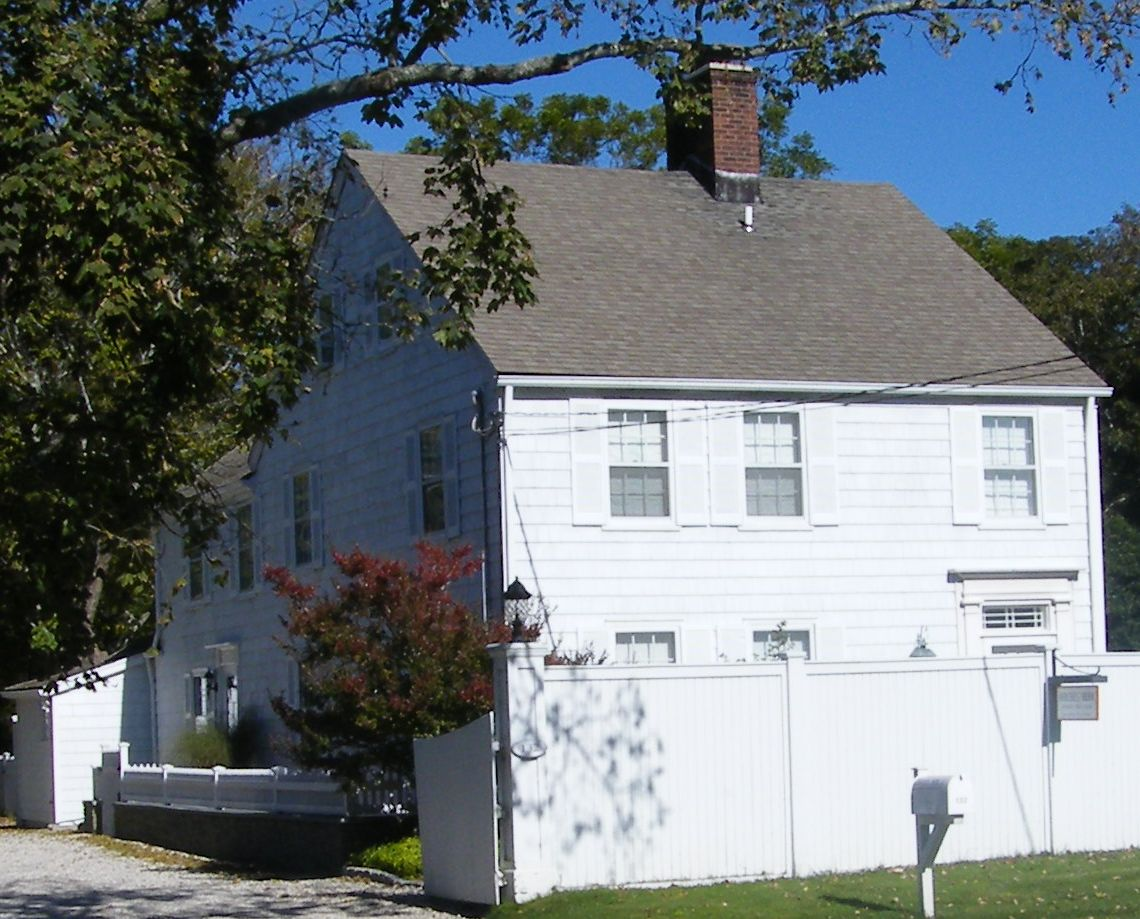
- House at Jericho, October 2008

- Location within New York Location within the United States
- Location: Montauk Hwy., East Hampton, New York
- Coordinates: 40°57′4″N 72°13′0″W
- Area: 5 acres (2.0 ha)
- Architect: Jones, Talmage; Et al.
- Architectural style: Federal
- MPS: Village of East Hampton MRA
- NRHP reference No.: 88001028
- Added to NRHP: July 21, 1988

Jericho Historic District is a national historic district located at East Hampton, New York in Suffolk County, New York. The district includes three contributing buildings. They are three early the 19th century, Federal style residences; the remnants of a historic settlement known as "Jericho." All are built of heavy timber-frame construction with shingled exterior sheathing.

It was added to the National Register of Historic Places in 1988.
