= Jericho Creek (Jordan Creek tributary) =

Location
- Country: United States
- State: Indiana
- County: Vermillion County

Physical characteristics
- Source
  - location: Vermilion County, Indiana, United States
  - coordinates: 40°4′13″N 87°27′15″W
- Mouth
  - location: Vermillion County, Indiana, United States
  - coordinates: 40°1′58″N 87°27′8″W
  - elevation: 541 ft (165 m)

Jericho Creek is a tributary of Jordan Creek in Vermillion County, Indiana.
