= Liberia national football team =

Liberia
- Nickname: The Lone Star
- Association: Liberia Football Association (LFA)
- Confederation: CAF (Africa)
- Sub-confederation: WAFU (West Africa)
- Head coach: Mohammed Erradi
- Captain: Oscar Dorley
- Most caps: Joe Nagbe (77)
- Top scorer: George Weah (18)
- Home stadium: SKD Stadium
- FIFA code: LBR
First colors	Second colors	Third colors

FIFA ranking
- Current: 146 ▼6 (7 October 2026)
- Highest: 66 (July 2001)
- Lowest: 164 (October–November 2010)

First international
- (France) Ivory Coast 0–2 Liberia (Abidjan, Ivory Coast; unknown date 1954)

Biggest win
- Liberia 5–0 Djibouti (Monrovia, Liberia; 29 March 2016)

Biggest defeat
- Ghana 6–0 Liberia (Accra, Ghana; 6 April 1975)

Africa Cup of Nations
- Appearances: 2 (first in 1996)
- Best result: Group stage (1996 and 2002)

The Liberia national football team, nicknamed the Lone Stars, represents Liberia in men's international football and is controlled by the Liberia Football Association. Although the nation produced the 1995 FIFA World Player of the Year, George Weah, its football team has never qualified for the FIFA World Cup and has qualified for the Africa Cup of Nations just twice—in 1996 and 2002. It is a member of both FIFA and the Confederation of African Football (CAF).

== History ==
=== African Cup of Nations ===
In 1965 Liberia played for the first time in the 1965 qualification qualifying campaign, losing its first match 0–1 against Ivory Coast. They also won 3–2 against DR Congo but lost both returning fixtures and were eliminated in the first round. In 1967 Liberia played in the 1968 qualification qualifying campaign, drawing its first match 2–2 against Guinea. They also drew against Senegal but lost both returning fixtures and were eliminated again in the first round. Liberia returned to qualifying in 1976 but lost in the preliminary round to Togo, falling in both fixtures. After another absence, this time of six years, Liberia again joined AFCON qualifying in 1982 in the preliminary rounds but failed to progress after two draws against Gambia, falling short as a result of the away goals rule.

Liberia withdrew from qualifying for the 1984 African Cup of Nations, but the following tournament they managed to secure their first win during qualifying, a 3–1 first-leg victory over Mauritania. They failed to capitalize on this advantage, however, and lost 3–0 in the second leg. They then faced Sierra Leone and Mali in the 1988 qualification and 1990 qualification campaigns respectively, but again failed to progress. In 1992, Liberia withdrew from qualifying before playing a match due to the ongoing First Liberian Civil War, and in 1994, Liberia was put into a group with two participants that withdrew during qualifying (Tanzania and Burkina Faso) however they failed to take advantage of this and finished with zero points, having lost to Ghana twice.

In the 1996 African Cup of Nations qualification, led by Ballon d’Or winner and captain George Weah, Liberia managed to register three wins—against Togo, Tunisia and Mauritania—and four draws, which saw them finish the group in second place and qualify for their first African Cup of Nations tournament. Following the withdrawal of Nigeria, Liberia was placed in a group with Gabon and Zaire. They opened the tournament with a 2–1 victory over Gabon with goals from Kelvin Sebwe and Mass Sarr Jr. but lost 2–0 to Zaire. This meant that Liberia finished bottom of the group on goal difference and failed to progress to the knock-out stages.

Liberia missed out on returning to the African Cup of Nations in 1998 as they finished one point off of qualification. In 2000, they defeated Niger in the preliminary rounds, but again failed to advance to the main tournament, this time finishing behind Algeria on goal difference.

In 2002 African Cup of Nations qualification, Liberia beat Cape Verde in the preliminary rounds, ultimately finishing top of their group to qualify for the tournament for the second time in their history. In the 2002 African Cup of Nations, Liberia drew their first game 1–1 with Mali with George Weah scoring the goal and drew their second game 2–2 against Algeria behind goals from Prince Daye and Kelvin Sebwe. In their final group game, though, needing a win against Nigeria to advance, they lost 1–0.

=== FIFA World Cup ===
Liberia first entered the qualifying process for the FIFA World Cup in 1966, however, they withdrew in protest against the fact that too few places had been reserved for Africa and Asia, along with all fourteen other African nations that had initially entered qualifying.

Liberia next entered qualifying in 1982 against Guinea after receiving a bye in the first round. They lost 1–0 over the two legs and were eliminated. In 1986, Liberia was again eliminated without having scored a goal, falling 4–0 to Nigeria. In 1990, Liberia won its first FIFA qualifying match defeating Ghana to progress to the second round. Despite finishing second in their group, Liberia failed to advance to the final qualification round, ending two points behind group winners Egypt.

In 1998, Liberia beat Gambia in the first qualification round, but finished twelve points adrift of Tunisia in their group. In 2002, Liberia had their strongest qualifying campaign, however, a loss against Ghana in their penultimate group game gave Nigeria the opportunity to overtake them and secure the only qualification spot.

== Team image ==
=== Kit supplier ===
Kit provider	Period
(Denmark) Hummel	1990–1993
(Italy) Diadora	1994–1995
(Germany) Adidas	1996–1998
(Liberia) Weah Sports	1999–2001
(Italy) Sportika	2002
(Germany) Adidas	2003–2004
(Denmark) Hummel	2004–2006
(Italy) Kappa	2006–2008
(Germany) Adidas	2008
(Singapore) Kubba	2009
(Germany) Adidas	2010–2012
(Italy) Erreà	2012
(Indonesia) SPECS	2012–2013
(Spain) Joma	2013–2014
(Germany) Adidas	2015–2020
(Germany) Puma	2021–2024
(Ethiopia) Wanaw	2024–present

== Results and fixtures ==
The following is a list of match results in the last 12 months, as well as any future matches that have been scheduled.

Win Draw Loss Fixture

=== 2025 ===
15 November Friendly	Guinea	2–0	Liberia	Mohammedia, Morocco
17:30 UTC+1	Sekou Bangoura; Yadaly Diaby 77'	Report		Stadium: El Bachir Stadium

=== 2026 ===
27 March Friendly	Benin	1–0	Liberia	Casablanca, Morocco
16:00 UTC+1	Tosin 85'	Report		Stadium: Père Jégo Stadium; Referee: Jalal Jayed (Morocco)

31 March Friendly	Liberia	2–2	Libya	Casablanca, Morocco
16:00 UTC+1	Dorley 76'; P. Balde 82'	Report	El Maremi 44'; Al-Musrati 45+1'	Stadium: Larbi Zaouli Stadium; Referee: Hamza El Fariq (Morocco)

6 June Friendly	Sierra Leone	1–0	Liberia	Freetown, Sierra Leone
16:00 UTC+0	Jarjue Kabia 67'	Report		Stadium: Bo Stadium

9 June Friendly	Liberia	3–1	Sierra Leone	Paynesville, Liberia
16:00 UTC+0	Teclar 30'; Kosiah 43', 71'	Report	D. Kanu 90+4'	Stadium: Samuel Kanyon Doe Sports Complex

25 September 2027 AFCON qualification	Rwanda	v	Liberia	Kigali, Rwanda
18:00 UTC+0				Stadium: Amahoro Stadium

29 September 2027 AFCON qualification	Liberia	v	Mali	TBD, Liberia
21:00 UTC+0				Stadium: TBD

11 November 2027 AFCON qualification	Cape Verde	v	Liberia	TBD, Cape Verde
TBD				Stadium: TBD

15 November 2027 AFCON qualification	Liberia	v	Cape Verde	TBD, Liberia
TBD				Stadium: TBD

=== 2027 ===
24 March 2027 AFCON qualification	Liberia	v	Rwanda	TBD, Liberia
TBD				Stadium: TBD

28 March 2027 AFCON qualification	Mali	v	Liberia	TBD, Mali
TBD				Stadium: TBD

== Coaching staff ==
Position	Name
Head coach	(Liberia) Thomas Kojo
Assistant coach	(Liberia) Kelvin Sebwe
Assistant coach	(Liberia) Harold Gbotoe
Goalkeeping coach	(Liberia) Chris Wesseh
Fitness coach	(Liberia) Desmond Mulbah

=== Coaching history ===
Caretaker managers are listed in italics

- (Liberia) Josiah Johnson (1971–78)
- (West Germany) Bert Trautmann (1978–80)
- (Brazil) Paulo Campos (1986)
- (Liberia) Walter Pelham (1986–1990)
- (Liberia) Wilfred Lardner (1990–1998)
- (Liberia) Kadalah Kromah (1999–2000)
- (France) Philippe Redon (2000–02)
- (Liberia) Dominic George Vava (2002)
- (Liberia) Kadalah Kromah (2002–04)
- (Liberia) Joseph Sayon (2004–06)
- (Egypt) Shawky El Din (2006)
- (Liberia) Frank Jericho Nagbe (2006–08)
- (Germany) Antoine Hey (2008–09)
- (Hungary) Bertalan Bicskei (2010–11)
- (Italy) Roberto Landi (2011–12)
- (Liberia) Thomas Kojo (2012)
- (Liberia) Kaetu Smith (2012)
- (Liberia) Frank Jericho Nagbe (2013)
- (Liberia) Thomas Kojo (2013)
- (Liberia) James Debbah (2013–17)
- (Liberia) Thomas Kojo (2018)
- (England) Peter Butler (2019–2022)
- (Liberia) Ansu Keita (2022)
- (Liberia) Thomas Kojo (2022–2023)
- (Liberia) Ansu Keita (2023)
- (Romania) Mario Marinica (2024)
- (Liberia) Thomas Kojo (2025)

== Players ==
=== Current squad ===
The following players were called up for the friendly matches against Benin and Libya on 27 and 31 March 2026; respectively.

Caps and goals correct as of 24 March 2025, after the match against Libya.

No.	Pos.	Player	Date of birth (age)	Caps	Goals	Club
	GK	Tommy Songo	20 April 1995 (age 31)	24	0	(Liberia Football Association) LISCR
	GK	Ashley Williams	30 October 2000 (age 25)	20	0	(Liberia Football Association) Bea Mountain
	GK	Junior Yeanaye	19 December 2004 (age 21)	7	0	(Liberia Football Association) Wologizi
	GK	Amos Wesseh	19 December 2000 (age 25)	1	0	(Royal Dutch Football Association) Rohda Raalte
	DF	Sampson Dweh	10 October 2001 (age 25)	36	1	(Football Association of the Czech Republic) Viktoria Plzeň
	DF	Prince Balde	23 March 1998 (age 28)	25	1	(Swedish Football Association) Trelleborgs FF
	DF	Sebastien Teclay	28 February 2000 (age 26)	16	0	(Liberia Football Association) LISCR
	DF	Mark Pabai	30 September 2000 (age 26)	14	0	(Football Association of Slovenia) Koper
	DF	Natus Swen	18 November 2004 (age 21)	13	0	(Moldovan Football Federation) Sheriff Tiraspol
	DF	Nelson Laomie	4 April 2005 (age 21)	11	0	(Liberia Football Association) Watanga
	DF	Emmanuel Fully	20 March 2006 (age 20)	5	0	(Football Association of the Czech Republic) Artis Brno
	DF	Tito Yormie	24 January 2002 (age 24)	1	0	(Football Federation of Belarus) Neman Grodno
	MF	Oscar Dorley	19 July 1998 (age 28)	53	4	(Saudi Arabian Football Federation) Al Taawoun
	MF	Divine Teah	19 April 2006 (age 20)	24	2	(Football Association of the Czech Republic) Slavia Prague
	MF	Solomon Tweh	30 August 2004 (age 22)	9	0	(Saudi Arabian Football Federation) Al Raed
	MF	Sheikh Sesay	24 October 2002 (age 23)	8	1	(Botswana Football Association) Gaborone United
	MF	Jegbay Konneh	11 November 2003 (age 22)	8	0	(Liberia Football Association) Heaven Eleven
	FW	Edward Ledlum	15 June 1999 (age 27)	21	1	(Algerian Football Federation) ASO Chlef
	FW	Peter Wilson	9 October 1996 (age 30)	19	2	(United States Soccer Federation) Oakland Roots SC
	FW	Sulahmana Bah	28 May 2001 (age 25)	5	1	(Egyptian Football Association) ZED
	FW	Jimmy Farkarlun	14 July 2001 (age 25)	5	1	(United States Soccer Federation) El Paso Locomotive
	FW	Emmanuel Flomo	31 October 2007 (age 18)	4	0	(Sudan Football Association) Al Hilal
	FW	Emmanuel Gono	29 October 2005 (age 20)	4	0	(Swedish Football Association) IK Oddevold
	FW	Prince Martor Jr.	9 July 2007 (age 19)	1	0	(Turkish Football Federation) Gençlerbirliği

=== Recent call-ups ===
The following players have been called up for the team in the last 12 months.

Pos.	Player	Date of birth (age)	Caps	Goals	Club	Latest call-up
DF	Kemoh Kamara	3 July 1995 (age 31)	25	0	(Liberia) Bea Mountain	v. Guinea, 15 November 2025
DF	Philip Tarnue	25 December 2005 (age 20)	12	0	(Liberia) Watanga	v. Guinea, 15 November 2025
DF	Josephus Mantor	8 September 2002 (age 24)	2	0	(Liberia) Fassell	v. Guinea, 15 November 2025
DF	Meshach Greene	23 April 2003 (age 23)	1	0	(Liberia) Paynesville	v. Guinea, 15 November 2025
MF	Mohammed Sangare	28 December 1998 (age 27)	24	4	(England) Morecambe	v. Guinea, 15 November 2025
MF	Armah Vaikainah	17 June 1995 (age 31)	14	0	(Malta) Marsaxlokk	v. Guinea, 15 November 2025
MF	Abdulai Bility	8 September 1999 (age 27)	7	1	(Liberia) Heaven Eleven	v. Guinea, 15 November 2025
FW	Ayouba Kosiah	22 July 2001 (age 25)	12	3	(Serbia) Radnik Surdulica	v. Guinea, 15 November 2025
FW	Chauncy Freeman	26 July 2001 (age 25)	8	0	(Liberia) Watanga	v. Guinea, 15 November 2025
FW	Daniel Toe	15 July 2000 (age 26)	7	0	(Liberia) LISCR	v. Guinea, 15 November 2025
FW	Nicholas Andrews	4 August 1998 (age 28)	6	3	(Malta) Fgura United	v. Guinea, 15 November 2025

== Records ==
As of 15 November 2025
Players in bold are still active with Liberia.

=== Most appearances ===
Rank	Name	Caps	Goals	Career
1	Joe Nagbe (Note: Nagbe retired from international duty in 2001 but later played two farewell matches in 2011.)	77	0	1986–2011
2	George Weah (Note: Weah retired from international duty in 2002 but later played a farewell match in 2018.)	75	18	1986–2018
3	Kelvin Sebwe	62	10	1988–2008
4	James Debbah (Note: Debbah retired from international duty in 2004 but later played a farewell match in 2018.)	58	13	1986–2018
5	**Oscar Dorley**	54	3	2015–present
6	George Gebro	48	1	1997–2012
7	Anthony Laffor	46	5	2004–2018
8	Teah Dennis Jr.	44	1	2011–2019
9	Varmah Kpoto	40	1	1997–2008
10	Fallah Johnson	37	0	1995–2004
10	Zizi Roberts	37	9	1995–2003

=== Top goalscorers ===
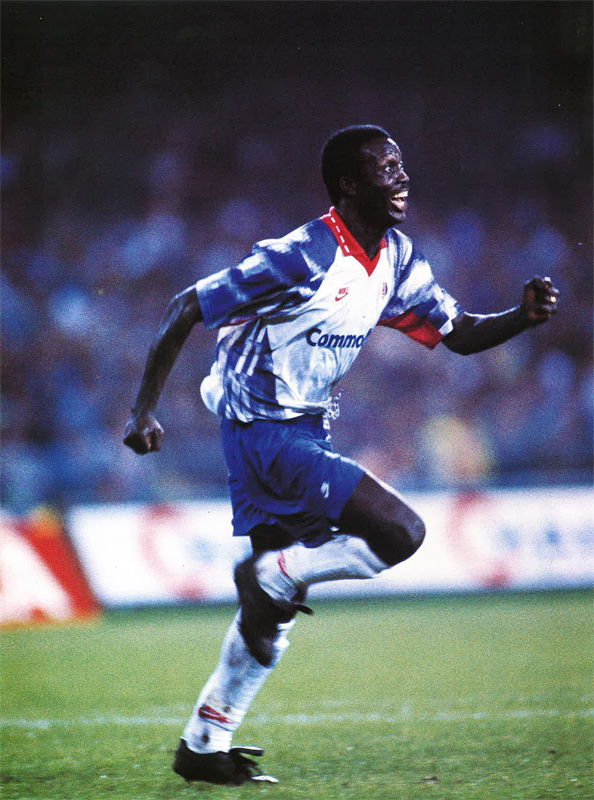
George Weah is Liberia's top scorer with 18 goals.

Rank	Name	Goals	Caps	Ratio	Career
1	George Weah	18	75	0.24	1986–2018
2	William Jebor	13	27	0.48	2011–2023
2	James Debbah	13	58	0.22	1986–2018
4	Kelvin Sebwe	10	62	0.16	1988–2008
5	Zizi Roberts	9	37	0.24	1995–2003
6	Oliver Makor	8	32	0.25	1995–2008
7	Prince Daye	7	25	0.28	1996–2004
7	Jonathan Sogbie	7	27	0.26	1988–1998
9	Zah Rahan	6	35	0.17	2006–2017
10	Francis Doe	5	22	0.23	2004–2016
10	Isaac Tondo	5	22	0.23	2000–2005
10	Dioh Williams	5	24	0.21	2004–2016
10	**Marcus Macauley**	5	28	0.18	2011–present
10	Anthony Laffor	5	46	0.11	2004–2018

== Competitive record ==
=== FIFA World Cup ===
FIFA World Cup record									Qualification record					
Year	Round	Position	Pld	W	D	L	GF	GA	Pld	W	D	L	GF	GA
(Uruguay) 1930 to (Chile) 1962	Not a FIFA member								Not a FIFA member					
(England) 1966	Withdrew								Withdrew					
(Mexico) 1970 to (Argentina) 1978	Did not enter								Declined participation					
(Spain) 1982	Did not qualify								2	0	1	1	0	1
(Mexico) 1986	Did not qualify								2	0	0	2	0	4
(Italy) 1990	Did not qualify								8	3	3	2	4	3
(United States) 1994	Withdrew during qualification								Withdrew during qualification					
(France) 1998	Did not qualify								8	2	1	5	7	12
(South Korea) (Japan) 2002	Did not qualify								10	6	1	3	11	8
(Germany) 2006	Did not qualify								12	2	1	9	6	29
(South Africa) 2010	Did not qualify								6	0	3	3	4	12
(Brazil) 2014	Did not qualify								6	1	1	4	3	9
(Russia) 2018	Did not qualify								4	1	1	2	4	6
(Qatar) 2022	Did not qualify								8	3	0	5	8	10
(Canada) (Mexico) (United States) 2026	Did not qualify								10	4	3	3	13	11
(Morocco) (Portugal) (Spain) 2030	To be determined								To be determined					
(Saudi Arabia) 2034	To be determined								To be determined					
Total	—	0/15	–	–	–	–	–	–	76	22	15	39	60	105

=== Africa Cup of Nations ===
Africa Cup of Nations record
Appearances: 2
Year	Round	Position	Pld	W	D	L	GF	GA
(Sudan) 1957	Not affiliated to CAF							
(United Arab Republic) 1959	Not affiliated to CAF							
(Ethiopia) 1962	Not affiliated to CAF							
(Ghana) 1963	Did not enter							
(Tunisia) 1965	Did not qualify							
(Ethiopia) 1968	Did not qualify							
(Sudan) 1970	Did not enter							
(Cameroon) 1972	Did not enter							
(Egypt) 1974	Did not enter							
(Ethiopia) 1976	Did not qualify							
(Ghana) 1978	Did not enter							
(Nigeria) 1980	Did not enter							
(Libya) 1982	Did not qualify							
(Ivory Coast) 1984	Withdrew							
(Egypt) 1986	Did not qualify							
(Morocco) 1988	Did not qualify							
(Algeria) 1990	Did not qualify							
(Senegal) 1992	Withdrew							
(Tunisia) 1994	Did not qualify							
(South Africa) 1996	Group stage	13th	2	1	0	1	2	3
(Burkina Faso) 1998	Did not qualify							
(Ghana) (Nigeria) 2000	Did not qualify							
(Mali) 2002	Group stage	9th	3	0	2	1	3	4
(Tunisia) 2004	Did not qualify							
(Egypt) 2006	Did not qualify							
(Ghana) 2008	Did not qualify							
(Angola) 2010	Did not qualify							
(Equatorial Guinea) (Gabon) 2012	Did not qualify							
(South Africa) 2013	Did not qualify							
(Equatorial Guinea) 2015	Did not qualify							
(Gabon) 2017	Did not qualify							
(Egypt) 2019	Did not qualify							
(Cameroon) 2021	Did not qualify							
(Ivory Coast) 2023	Did not qualify							
(Morocco) 2025	Did not qualify							
(Kenya) (Tanzania) (Uganda) 2027	To be determined							
Total	Group stage	2/35	5	1	2	2	5	7

== Honors ==
=== Regional ===
- WAFU Nations Cup
  - (bronze) Third place (1): 2011
- West African Nations Cup
  - (silver) Runners-up (1): 1987
- CEDEAO Cup
  - (silver) Runners-up (1): 1987
