= Riha Adagio =

Dutch electronic organ

RIHA Adagio (also sometimes Ri-Ha Adagio) is a Dutch electronic organ with a built-in Leslie speaker and a fine wood finish. Similar to other RIHA organs, the Adagio was made by Benelux Musical Instruments, The Hague, the Netherlands. A fine member of those line of all-transistor Dutch organs that featured eight models in three console finishes - walnut, teak, and rosewood. All of them have standard features, including, but not limited to, pedal volume control, brilliance control, and reverberation. The Adagio is one of the once popular RIHA models, along with the Festivo, the Andante, and the Allegro.

== Keyboards and pedalboard ==
The RIHA Adagio has two manuals, a pedalboard, and an expression pedal. Both manuals have four octaves (49 notes).

The organ comes with a bass pedalboard, so that the organist can play bass lines with his feet. However, the pedal keyboard has just one octave (13 notes) which is much shorter than that of larger organs. The balance of keyboards volumes is adjustable with a potentiometer. Pedalboard volume can be set separately.

=== Tabs ===
The RIHA Adagio organ has 19 tabs for the upper keyboard, 11 tabs for the lower keyboard, and 4 tabs for the pedalboard.

=== Upper keyboard ===
Upper keyboard tabs
Tab	Pitch length
TIBIA	16'
DIAPASON	16'
FAGOTT	16'
FLUTE	8'
CLARINET	8'
PRINCIPAL	8'
SALICET	8'
OBOE	8'
FR. HORN	8'
STRING	8'
COLOUR	5 1/3'
FLUTE	4'
SALICE	4'
OCTAVE	4'
VIOLIN	4'
QUINT	2 2/3'
CIMBEL	2 2/3'
FLUTE	2'
STRING	2'

=== Lower keyboard ===
Lower keyboard tabs
Tab	Pitch length
HORN	16'
CELLO	16'
TIBIA	8'
REED	8'
HORN DIAP.	8'
GAMBA	8'
FLUTE	4'
OCTAVE	4'
VIOLIN	4'
FLUTE	2'
PICCOLO	2'

=== Pedalboard ===
Pedal tabs
Tab	Pitch length
SUBBAS	16'
STOPPED	8'
PRINCIPAL	8'
OCTAVE	4'

== Effects ==
The RIHA Adagio offers a wide variety of keyboard, pedalboard, and special effects.

The effect of the Leslie speaker is not the only feature of the organ that is similar to the ones found in Hammond organs. The organist can use the harmonic percussion effect whose stop, time, repeat, and volume can be set separately.

A reverberation effect is also available, as well as the V-speed, V-depth, V-cancel, and V-delay. There is a SUSTAIN effect for the pedalboard.

== Notable performers ==
RIHA organs are far less well-known than other electronic organs, such as Hammond, but there are some famous organists who played RIHA organs (not necessarily the Adagio). Some examples are:

- Brian Sharp: B# Past & Present (CD) [CDGRS 1333], Organ Fiesta Volume 2 (Tape) [VFM VCA082]
- Han Meyer: 23 Instruments In One Organ (LP) [B.M.I. 113 503]

== See also ==
- Hammond organ
