= Jetětice =

- Municipality
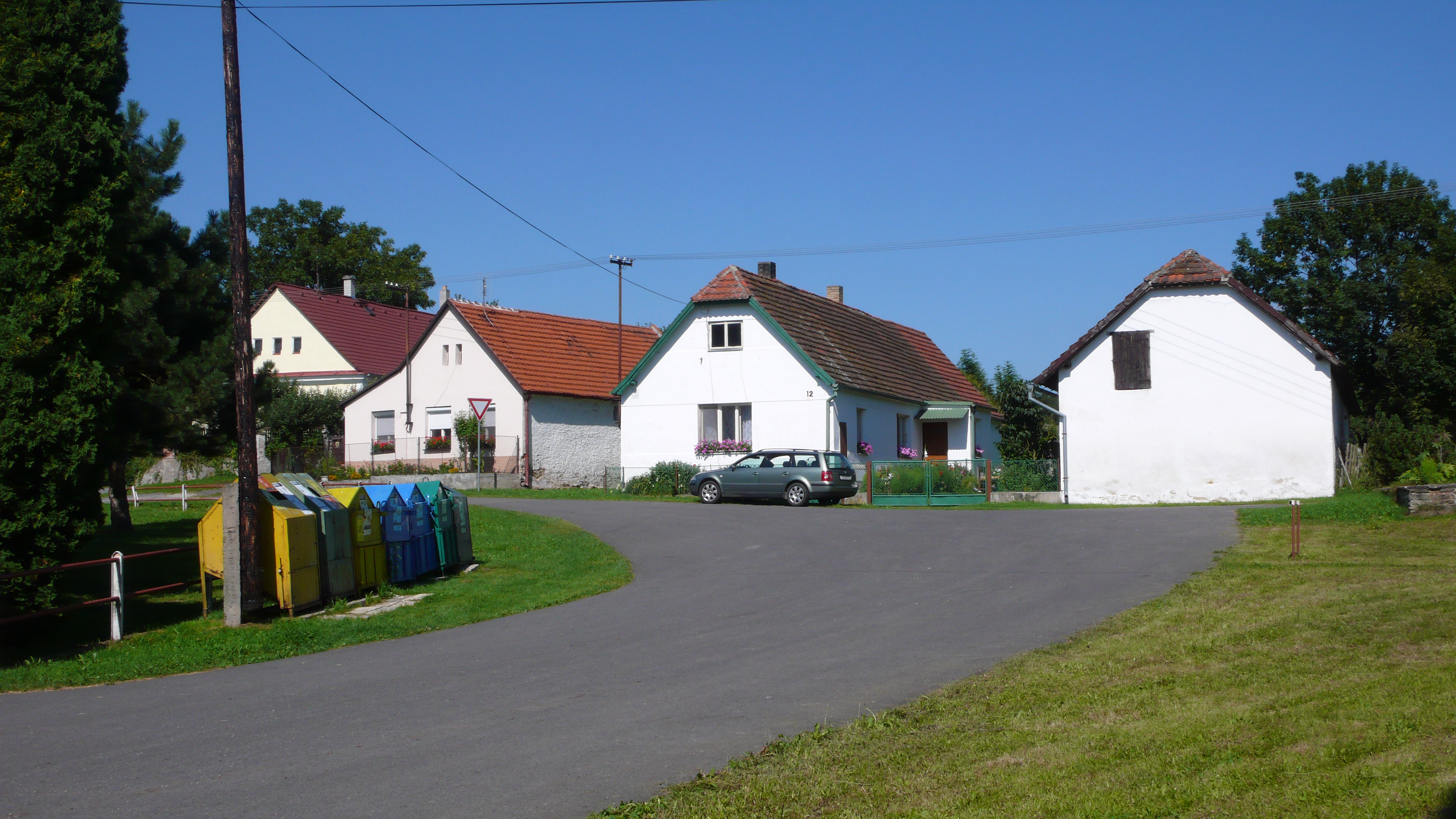
- Centre of Jetětice

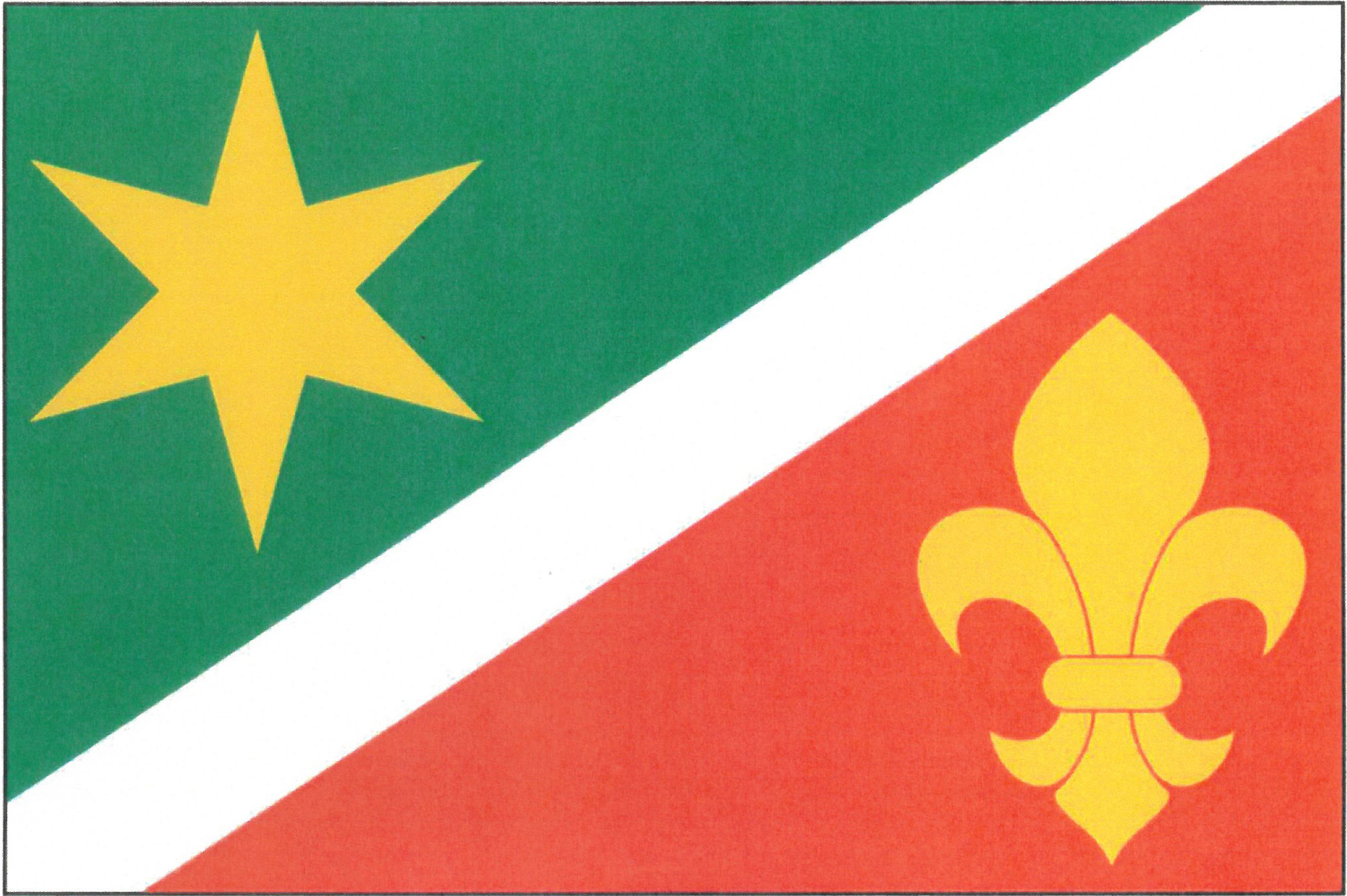
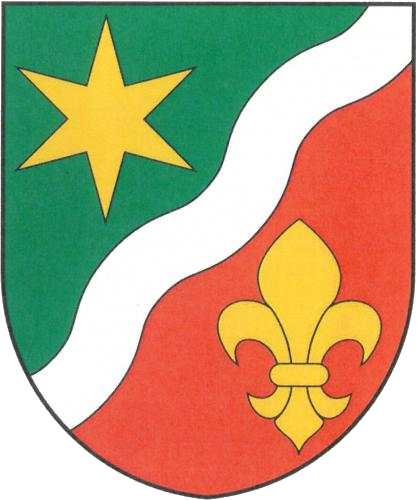
- Flag Coat of arms

- Location in the Czech Republic
- Coordinates: 49°23′10″N 14°17′33″E
- Country: Czech Republic
- Region: South Bohemian
- District: Písek
- First mentioned: 1463

Area
  - Total: 13.72 km^{2} (5.30 sq mi)
- Elevation: 447 m (1,467 ft)

Population (2026-01-01)
  - Total: 373
  - Density: 27.2/km^{2} (70.4/sq mi)
- Time zone: UTC+1 (CET)
  - Summer (DST): UTC+2 (CEST)
- Postal code: 398 48
- Website: www.jetetice.cz

Jetětice is a municipality and village in Písek District in the South Bohemian Region of the Czech Republic. It has about 400 inhabitants.

== Administrative division ==
Jetětice consists of two municipal parts (in brackets population according to the 2021 census):

- Jetětice (214)
- Červená (101)

== Etymology ==
The original name of the village was probably Dětětice. The name was derived from the personal name Dětěta, meaning "the village of Dětěta's people".

== Geography ==
Jetětice is located about 13 kilometres (8 mi) northeast of Písek and 47 km (29 mi) north of České Budějovice. It lies in the Tábor Uplands. The highest point is at 525 metres (1,722 ft) above sea level. The municipality is situated on the shore of the Orlík Reservoir, built on the Vltava River.

== History ==
The first written mention of Jetětice is from 1463.

== Demographics ==
Historical population

Year	Pop.	±%
1869	630	—
1880	551	−12.5%
1890	552	+0.2%
1900	540	−2.2%
1910	579	+7.2%

Year	Pop.	±%
1921	603	+4.1%
1930	635	+5.3%
1950	476	−25.0%
1961	447	−6.1%
1970	427	−4.5%

Year	Pop.	±%
1980	345	−19.2%
1991	302	−12.5%
2001	296	−2.0%
2011	291	−1.7%
2021	315	+8.2%

Source: Censuses

== Transport ==
Jetětice is located on the railway line Písek–Tábor.

== Sights ==
The only cultural monuments in the municipality is the Červená Railway Bridge, located on the municipal border. It was built over the Orlík Reservoir in 1886–1889. It is a valuable technical monument.

The main landmark of the village is the Chapel of the Nativity of the Virgin Mary.
