= Lukáš Říha =

Czech ice hockey player

- Born: March 20, 1981 (age 44); Litvínov, Czechoslovakia
- Height: 6 ft 0 in (183 cm)
- Weight: 165 lb (75 kg; 11 st 11 lb)
- Position: Forward
- Shoots: Left
- Polish I Liga team: TH Unia Oświęcim
- NHL draft: Undrafted
- Playing career: 2001–present

Lukáš Říha (born March 20, 1981) is a Czech professional ice hockey player who plays in Poland with TH Unia Oświęcim. He previously played in the Slovak Extraliga with MHC Martin, and has also played 131 games in the Czech Extraliga.
