= Jericho Creek (Hunting Creek tributary) =

Location
- Country: United States
- State: California
- County: Lake County

Physical characteristics
- Source
  - location: Lake County, California, United States
  - coordinates: 38°50′2″N 122°27′23″W
- Mouth: Hunting Creek
  - location: Lake County, California, United States
  - coordinates: 38°47′46″N 122°24′16″W
  - elevation: 876 ft (267 m)
- Length: 7 mi (11 km)

Jericho Creek is a seven-mile long tributary of Hunting Creek located in Lake County, California. Rising on Bishop Mountain, the stream flows northeast through Jericho Valley, then flows southeast and southwest through Paradise Valley to its confluence with Hunting Creek.
