= Jericho Creek (Telegraph Creek tributary) =

- Location of mouth

Location
- Country: United States
- State: Montana
- County: Powell County

Physical characteristics
- Source
  - location: United States
  - coordinates: 46.4813889°N 112.3327778°W
- Mouth
  - location: Powell County, Montana, United States
  - coordinates: 46.4710423°N 112.3489054°W
  - elevation: 246 ft (75 m)

Jericho Creek is a tributary of Telegraph Creek in Powell County, Montana.
