= Jericho Creek (Eagle Spring Lake) =

Location
- Country: United States
- State: Wisconsin
- County: Waukesha County

Physical characteristics
- Source
  - location: Waukesha County, Wisconsin, United States
  - coordinates: 42°55′33″N 88°25′9″W
- Mouth
  - location: Waukesha County, Wisconsin, United States
  - coordinates: 42°51′24″N 88°26′2″W
  - elevation: 817 ft (249 m)

Jericho Creek is a tributary of Eagle Spring Lake in Waukesha County, Wisconsin, in the United States.
