= Peaceful Families Project =

It's so good organization in the word

The Peaceful Families Project (PFP) is among the pioneering Muslim organizations working to end domestic violence in Muslim families and communities. A national organization established in Northern Virginia in 2000, they provide Islamically grounded awareness workshops for Muslim community leaders and members, and cultural sensitivity trainings for professionals serving Muslims.

== Foundation ==
PFP was founded by Sharifa Alkhateeb (1946-2004) in the year 2000. Alkhateeb was a pioneer who spent 40 years advocating for the civil rights of Muslims in the United States, and for Muslim women's rights in particular. She worked on behalf of Muslim victims of domestic violence, and collaborated with Muslim leaders and communities across the nation from 2000-2004 conducting workshops to raise awareness levels. In 1993 she conducted the first national study on the prevalence of physical violence among Muslims in the United States, showing that 10% of Muslims were experiencing physical abuse, a figure that is comparable to national statistics and other faith groups. Her enthusiasm inspired Muslim activists to become proactive in their own communities, resulting in the development of domestic violence organizations and victim resources in many Muslim communities.

== Current work and publications ==
PFP has been one of the first Muslim domestic violence organizations to develop educational resources designed specifically for Muslim audiences. In 2007 they published the first edited volume on domestic violence among Muslims, Change From Within: Diverse Perspectives on Domestic Violence in Muslim Communities. They also co-produced the premiere documentary on domestic violence among Muslims in conjunction with FaithTrust Institute, Garments for One Another: Ending Domestic Violence in Muslim Families. The Co-Director serves on the Leadership Team of FaithTrust Institute.

== See also ==
- Islam and domestic violence
- AHA Foundation, organization devoted to Muslim women's rights
