= Liberia national under-17 football team =

National under-17 association football team representing Liberia

Liberia U-17
- Nickname(s): The Lone Stars
- Association: Liberia Football Association
- Confederation: CAF (Africa)
- Sub-confederation: WAFU (West Africa)
- Home stadium: SKD Stadium
- FIFA code: LBR
First colours	Second colours

U-17 Africa Cup of Nations
- Appearances: None

FIFA U-17 World Cup
- Appearances: None

The Liberia national under-17 football team is one of the national male football teams of Liberia.It represents Liberia at the under-17 level in international competitions. It has become Liberians favorite (of all the national teams) due to its unique (possession) style of play, being referred to as "tao tao".

Ansumana Keita is the current manager of the Liberia national under-17 football team.

== Competitive record ==
=== FIFA U-16 and U-17 World Cup record ===
FIFA U-16 and U-17 World Cup
Year	Round	PLD	W	D*	L	GS	GA
(China) 1985	Did not qualify						
(Canada) 1987	Did not qualify						
(Scotland) 1989	Did not qualify						
(Italy) 1991	Did not qualify						
(Japan) 1993	Did not qualify						
(Ecuador) 1995	Did not qualify						
(Egypt) 1997	Did not qualify						
(New Zealand) 1999	Did not qualify						
(Trinidad and Tobago) 2001	Did not qualify						
(Finland) 2003	Did not qualify						
(Peru) 2005	Did not qualify						
(South Korea) 2007	Did not qualify						
(Nigeria) 2009	Did not qualify						
(Mexico) 2011	Did not qualify						
(United Arab Emirates) 2013	Did not qualify						
(Chile) 2015	Did not qualify						
(India) 2017	Did not qualify						
(Brazil) 2019	Did not qualify						
(Indonesia) 2023	Did not qualify						
(Qatar) 2025	Did not qualify						
(Qatar) 2026	To be determined						
Total	0/20	0	0	0	0	0	0

== See also ==
- Liberia national football team
- Liberia national under-20 football team
