= Jericho Creek (Plum Island River tributary) =

Location
- Country: United States
- State: Massachusetts
- County: Essex County

Physical characteristics
- Source
  - location: Essex County, Massachusetts, United States
  - coordinates: 42°45′57″N 70°50′10″W
- Mouth
  - location: Essex County, Massachusetts, United States
  - coordinates: 42°46′6″N 70°49′8″W
  - elevation: 0 ft (0 m)

Jericho Creek is a tributary of Plum Island River, Essex County, Massachusetts.
