= Martin Josef Říha =

Czech Catholic bishop (1839–1907)

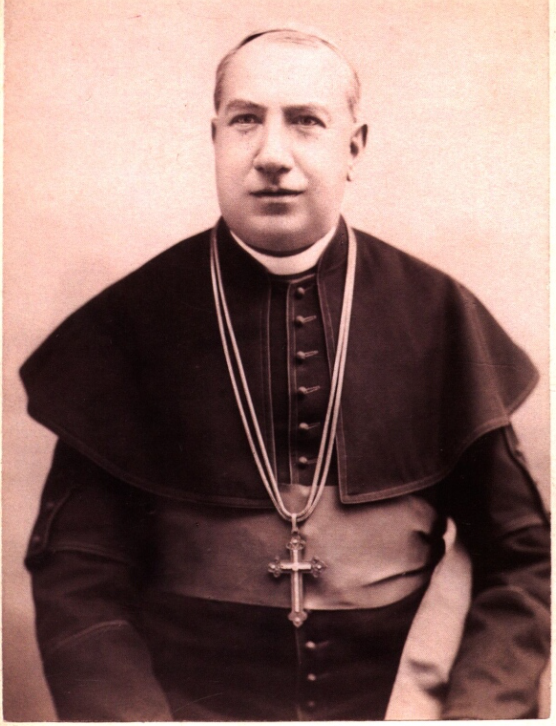

Martin Josef Říha (11 November 1839, Oslov – 7 February 1907, České Budějovice) was a Czech Roman Catholic clergyman. From 1885 until his death he was bishop of České Budějovice.

== Sources ==
- "Österreichisches Biographisches Lexikon Page 163" (PDF).
- "Bishop Martin Josef Říha".
