= Jericho Creek (North Fork John Day River tributary) =

Location
- Country: United States
- State: Oregon
- County: Umatilla County

Physical characteristics
- Source
  - location: Umatilla County, Oregon, United States
  - coordinates: 40°2′33″N 119°6′28″W
- Mouth
  - location: Umatilla County, Oregon, United States
  - coordinates: 45°0′44″N 119°3′5″W
  - elevation: 2,615 ft (797 m)

Jericho Creek is a tributary of North Fork John Day River in Umatilla County, Oregon, in the United States.
