= Jericho (play) =

Jericho is a play by American playwright Jack Canfora that gives a fictional account of the lives of a group of people affected by the September 11 attacks several years after the events. The play received an Edgerton Foundation New American Play Award and was selected for the National New Play Network's Rolling World Premiere. In April 2011, it was named to the Orlando Shakespeare Festival's "Playfest" reading series. It was produced Off-Broadway at 59E59 Theaters in New York City in 2013 and was named a New York Times Critics' Pick.

== Plot ==
Set several years after the September 11 attacks, Jericho follows a family and their friends during a Thanksgiving gathering on Long Island. The family gathering becomes confrontational as the characters discuss their experiences of September 11, grief, and their personal relationships.

== Production ==
Jericho was first presented as a staged reading at Rattlestick Playwrights Theater in New York City on May 18, 2009. In 2010, it was a finalist for the National New Play Network Festival and was presented at the network's convention at Curious Theatre Company in Denver, Colorado, on December 4.

The play was also selected for the National New Play Network's Rolling World Premiere. The first production opened at the New Jersey Repertory Company in Long Branch, New Jersey, on October 13, 2011. Productions at the Phoenix Theatre in Indianapolis and Florida Studio Theatre in Sarasota followed during 2011 and 2012.

The play was presented Off-Broadway at 59E59 Theaters from October 4 to November 3, 2013. The production starred Jill Eikenberry. It was later produced by the Minnesota Jewish Theatre Company in April 2015. Broadway Play Publishing published Jericho on November 26, 2012. The play was also selected for the Orlando Shakespeare Festival's PlayFest reading series in April 2011.

== Reception ==
The 2013 Off-Broadway production received a Critics' Pick from The New York Times, and received positive reviews from Sarasota Magazine, CurtainUp and BrodwayWorld.
