= Jericho Creek (Flat Fork Creek tributary) =

Location
- Country: United States
- State: Texas
- County: Shelby County

Physical characteristics
- Source
  - location: Shelby County, Texas, United States
  - coordinates: 31°51′5″N 94°9′0″W
- Mouth
  - location: Shelby County, Texas, United States
  - coordinates: 31°53′28″N 94°7′35″W
  - elevation: 203 ft (62 m)

Jericho Creek is a tributary of Flat Fork Creek in Shelby County, Texas in the United States.
