= Jack Canfora =

American dramatist

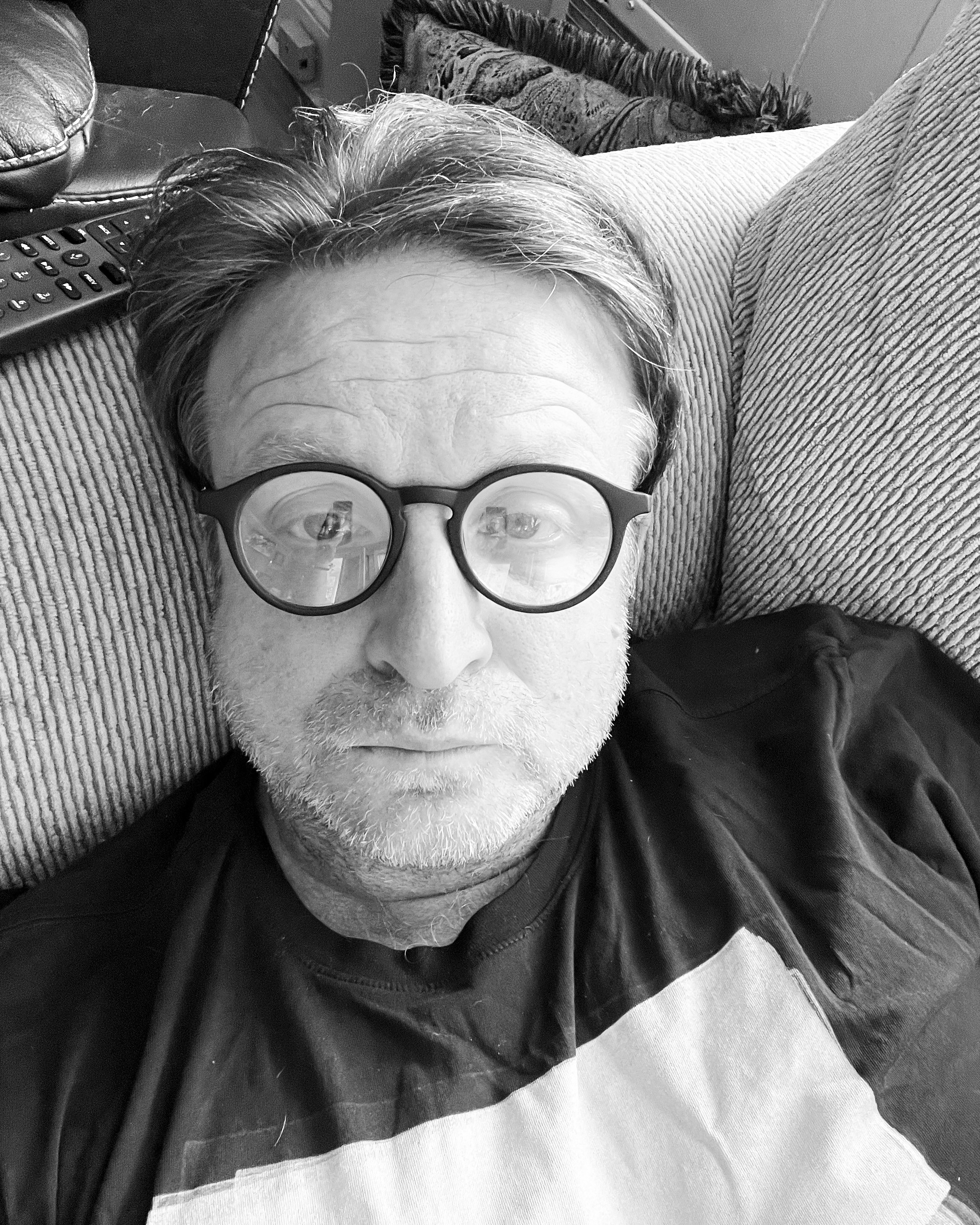
- Born: April 6, 1969 (age 57)
- Education: London Academy of Music and Dramatic Art
- Occupations: Playwright and actor
- Writing career
- Notable works: Place Setting; Jericho; The Source; Fellow Travelers; The Vienna Lessons
- Notable awards: Webby Award

John Lawrence "Jack" Canfora (born April 6, 1969) is an American playwright, actor and educator. He is best known for his contemporary plays exploring family dynamics, politics, ethics, and social issues, many of which have been produced at regional and Off-Broadway theatres throughout the United States. His works include Jericho, Poetic License, The Source, Fellow Travelers, and The Vienna Lessons.

In addition to his work as a playwright, Canfora has worked extensively as a stage actor and director and serves as the Artistic Director of New Normal Rep, a theatre company he co-founded to develop and present new and classic works. He has won two Edgerton Awards and three webby awards.

His plays have been reviewed by publications including Thes New York Times, Associated Press, The Newark Star-Ledger, BroadwayWorld, and CurtainUp. In 2026, The Murderer Killings received both the Webby Award and the Webby People's Voice Award in the Scripted (Fiction), Limited-Series & Specials podcast category. The podcast also received recognition at the 2026 NYC Podcast Awards, where it was nominated in several fiction and production categories and received an award. Canfora is credited with Satow as a creator of the series.

== Education and early career ==
After receiving his dramatic training at the London Academy of Music and Dramatic Art, he began his career as an actor in regional theater, working mostly in Shakespearean roles such as Mercutio and Macbeth as well appearing in the title roles in Hamlet, Gardner McKay's Toyer: An Unavoidable Tragedy, and in a 1995 production of "Variations on the Death of Trotsky".Canfora has also performed on television for the educational series TV411. He also wrote for the show. His career as a writer began in the mid-1990s as a sketch writer for various New York-based sketch groups. After his sketch group "The Waiting Room" disbanded in 1999, he turned to playwriting, beginning with one-act comedies which were performed regionally in different parts of the United States.

== Works ==
=== Place Setting ===
In September, 2005, his play Place Setting was read in Los Angeles, directed by veteran film director Howard Deutch and starring Jon Cryer and Steven Weber.

In June 2007, Canfora performed in Place Setting at the New Jersey Repertory Company. The play received largely positive reviews. Talkinbroadway.com said that while the play wasn't especially original, it did "provide witty, involving and thought provoking entertainment." It also praised his performance in the role of Greg. Curtainup.com wrote "Canfora, who skillfully embraces both acting and writing, may not leave any of the characters unscarred or unscathed, but we are certainly kept alert and empathetic to their quandaries." "The Newark Star-Ledger called the play "funny and fascinating," adding that "Canfora has wonderfully incisive wit". The Newark Star Ledger nominated "Place Setting" for "Best Play" for 2007-2008 along with plays by Edward Albee, Theresa Rebeck, and Elaine May.

=== A World with Snow/Poetic License ===
In March 2005, his play A World with Snow was read publicly in New York City and starred Austin Pendleton.

In September, 2008, the New Jersey Repertory Company produced his play Poetic License (also known as A World with Snow) to largely mixed reviews. The New York Times wrote of the play and its characters "All their relationships are clearly drawn, and their dialogue is at once educated, revealing and lively. Part of the fascination of the play's first hour lies simply in the caliber of their verbal interaction. But the other part of it lies in the surprise twists Mr. Canfora has cooked up (which make discussion of the play's specifics difficult without revealing too much). The two he lets fly in the first act are both stunners. " However, it contends that the second act fell flat and urged Canfora to revise the second act, writing that in this incarnation the play was only a "glorious tease." He completed a rewrite of the play in March, 2010. The play had its Off-Broadway debut at 59E59 Theaters in February, 2012, starring Canadian actor Geraint Wyn-Davies. It received generally strong reviews. The New York Post wrote" It's hard to imagine that a crackling drama could revolve around a poet laureate's career. But Jack Canfora's “Poetic License” manages to render a tale of artistic ambition and hidden secrets with the breathlessness of a well-paced thriller." The Associated Press and Time Out New York offered similar praise, and the New York Times, while criticizing the plot's central premise, described it as "smartly written."

Abingdon Theatre named Canfora, on the strength of "Poetic License," the winner of the 2011 Christopher Brian Wolk award for playwriting.

The play was published in April, 2016 by Broadway Play Publishing Inc.

His third play, Jericho, had a public staged reading at The Rattlestick Theatre in New York City on May 18, 2009. In October, 2010, The National New Play Network named Jericho," a finalist in their annual National New Play Network Festival. It was read at their convention in Denver, Colorado, on December 4, 2010, at the Curious Theatre.

In 2018, his play, "Fellow Travelers," which delved into the relationships between Arthur Miller, Elia Kazan, and Marilyn Monroe, was performed at The Bay Street Theatre to positive reviews.

His play "The Source" won an Edgerton New Play Award and was performed at New Jersey Repertory in March 2019.

During the pandemic of 2020/2021, Canfora co-founded and become the Artistic Director of the online theater company, "New Normal Rep"

=== The Source ===
The Source is a play by Canfora that premiered at the New Jersey Repertory Company in March 2019. Inspired in part by the phone-hacking scandal involving media organizations in the United Kingdom, the drama explores the relationship between media power, privacy, corporate ambition, and journalistic ethics through the story of a powerful newspaper family. Although influenced by real events, Canfora has described the work as a fictional drama rather than a dramatization of specific individuals.

Before its premiere, The Source received an Edgerton Foundation New Play Award, supporting its development and production. The play marked Canfora's fourth world premiere at New Jersey Repertory Company and was directed by Evan Bergman. Critics noted its contemporary subject matter and its examination of moral compromise, media influence, and personal responsibility.

=== Fellow Travelers ===
Fellow Travelers is a play by Canfora that explores the complex personal and professional relationships among playwright Arthur Miller, director Elia Kazan, and actress Marilyn Monroe during the period surrounding the Hollywood blacklist and the investigations of the House Un-American Activities Committee. The play examines themes of loyalty, artistic integrity, political conviction, and the personal consequences of public choices.

The play premiered at Bay Street Theater in 2018. Critics noted its blending of historical events with fictionalized dramatic dialogue, highlighting Canfora's exploration of moral ambiguity and the intersection of politics and personal relationships. Reviews in publications including BroadwayWorldand The New York Times discussed the work's historical context and character-driven narrative.

=== The Vienna Lessons ===
''The Vienna Lessons'' is a play by Canfora that received its world premiere at the New Jersey Repertory Company in Long Branch, New Jersey, in June 2026. Directed by Evan Bergman, the comic drama is set in Vienna in 1787 and imagines a meeting between Wolfgang Amadeus Mozart and the teenage Ludwig van Beethoven, whose historical encounter remains a subject of debate among music historians.

The play depicts Beethoven approaching Mozart in the hope of hiring him as a teacher.It explores an imagined relationship between the two composers, contrasting their ages, temperaments, and approaches to music while portraying the artistic connection that develops between them. The production incorporates works by Mozart and Beethoven as well as imagined musical collaborations between the composers. Jesse Kodama portrayed Mozart, Quentin Chisholm played Beethoven, and Sandy Clancy appeared as Constanze Mozart.

Reviewing the premiere for BroadwayWorld, Marina Kennedy described the production as a "smart and compelling world premiere play" and praised Bergman's direction and the three-person cast. Other reviews noted the play's combination of comedy and drama and its speculative treatment of a possible relationship between two major figures in Western classical music.

Canfora co-created The Murderer Killings - A True* Crime Podcast' with actor and producer Michael Satow. A scripted comedy and parody of the true-crime podcast genre, the series follows fictional podcaster Charlie Incarica as he investigates an elaborate murder case in the town of Shady Grove. The ten-episode series uses the narrative conventions and investigative style associated with true-crime podcasts for satirical purposes.

== Awards and honors ==
Canfora has received awards for his work in theatre and digital media. His play Jericho received an Edgerton Foundation New Play Award and was selected for a National New Play Network Rolling World Premiere. Its Off-Broadway production at 59E59 Theaters was named a New York Times Critics' Pick.

In 2011, Canfora received the Christopher Brian Wolk Award from the Abingdon Theatre Company for Poetic License. His play The Source later received an Edgerton Foundation New Play Award in 2018, making Canfora a two-time recipient of the award.

Canfora has also received three Webby honors. In 2016, The Small Time, which he co-created and co-wrote with Andrew Rein, won the Webby Award for Best Writing in Online Film & Video. In 2026, the satirical true-crime podcast The Murderer Killings, co-created by Canfora and Michael Satow, received both the Webby Award and the People's Voice Award in the Scripted (Fiction), Limited-Series and Specials category.
