= Administration system for the state information system RIHA =

Estonian catalogue of public sector information systems

Administration system for the state information system (RIHA) (Estonian: Riigi infosüsteemi haldussüsteem – RIHA) of Estonia is the Estonian catalogue of public sector information systems. It serves as the national registry of systems, components, services, data models, semantic assets.

From a legal point of view, RIHA is a set of principles as well as a major state register. It is regulated by the Public Information Act and a special regulation. The use of RIHA is mandatory for state agencies. Technically, RIHA is a secure web-based database and software application.

== Objectives ==
The objective of RIHA is to ensure the transparency of administration of the state information system and planning for information management, and to support the interoperability of databases of the state, local governments and private persons performing public duties, and allow compliance control functions.

== Principles ==
The principles of RIHA are:

1. Principle of legality: data shall be processed in a database belonging to the state information system in the course of performance of public duties, for the purpose of performance of obligations prescribed by an Act, legislation issued on the basis thereof, or an international agreement.
2. Principle of unity: the databases belonging to the state information system must be compatible with each other and be capable of interoperability, exchange of data and verification of data.
3. Principle of use of basic data: data shall be gathered from sources which are as authentic as possible and shall be consolidated in a database which, in respect of that data, shall be a common source for all the databases belonging to the state information system in the performance of their functions imposed by law.
4. Principle of traceability: all inquiries made to a database and responses provided to the users shall be stored (in the case of information systems interfaced to the data exchange layer of the information systems, in the security logs of secure servers). It shall be possible to establish and restore data in a database and the fact of processing thereof.
5. Principle of use of up-to-date information technology: the possibilities offered by up-to-date information technology shall be exploited to the maximum extent in the administration of databases belonging to the state information system. Data shall be processed digitally.
6. Service-centred approach to exchange of data: exchange of data (cross-usage) between different databases and processors shall be carried out based on data services.
7. Principle of technical and organisational optimality: a database is established and changed taking account of the principles for administration of the state information system and based on the good practice and the interoperability frameworks for state information technology established by the Minister of Economic Affairs and Communications.

== Catalogue ==
RIHA gives information on the following subjects:

- Which are the information systems and databases that make up the state’s information system;
- Which data are collected and processed and in which information systems;
- Which services, incl. X-Road services, are provided and who is using them;
- Who are the responsible and authorised processors of the information systems and databases, and who are the contact persons;
- On which legal basis are the databases operated and the data processed;
- The reusable components that ensure the interoperability of information systems (XML assets, classifications, dictionaries and ontologies).
