= Frank Jericho Nagbe =

Liberian footballer

Frank Wontee Nagbe
Personal information
- Date of birth: May 11, 1958 (age 68)
- Place of birth: Diyakpo Bokon Jadae, Liberia
- Position: Midfielder

Youth career
- William VS Tubman High School

Senior career*
Years	Team	Apps	(Gls)
1972–1975	Saint Jerry		
1975–1976	Invincible Eleven		
1976–1977	Sporting Club de Gagnoa		
1977–1984	Invincible Eleven		

International career
1975–1983	Liberia		

Managerial career
- 1985–1986: NPA Anchors
- 1986–1988: Sinoe County
- 1988–1989: NPA Anchors
- 1989–1993: Invincible Eleven
- 1993–1997: Junior Professionals
- 1997–1998: Saint Anthony
- 1998–2002: Liberia (Assistant)
- 2003–2004: Sinoe County
- 2004–2006: NPA Anchors
- 2006–2007: Liberia
- 2013: Liberia
- * Club domestic league appearances and goals

Frank Wontee Nagbe (born May 11, 1958 in Diyakpo Bokon Jadae) is a Liberian football manager and former professional player who currently coaches Liberia. Frank Wontee Nagbe, popularly known as Jericho, is the man who has placed NPA Anchors at the top of the premier league, following victories over Mighty Barolle and Invincible Eleven (IE).

== Personal life ==
He is a Muslim who resides in West Point. He is married with children. His son Frank Nagbe Junior is the captain of the NPA Anchors.

== Playing career ==
Jerico is a product of the William VS Tubman High School in Sinkor. The Liberian tactician played active soccer both at home and abroad. He started with Saint Jerry (1972–1975) before moving to Invincible Eleven (IE) from 1975 to 1984. Jerico, who was a midfielder, spent one season (1976–1977) with Sporting Club de Gagnoa in Côte d'Ivoire. As a player, he won the league title with IE in 1976, the year he was voted Most Valuable Player, and the six-nation tournament with the Lone Star in 1979. In Côte d'Ivoire, Jerico won the league championship with Gagnoa in 1977. He spent eight years on the national team as a regular player, which enabled Jericho to face great teams of Africa, Europe and the Americas. He got trained in Mexico in 1980.

== Managerial career ==
The NPA Anchors manager started his coaching sojourn in the second division with West Point-based La-Modell International in 1985. Three years later, under Jerico, the club reached the first division. Coach Nagbe led his native Sinoe County to three County Meet tournaments. Under him, Sinoe finished as champions in 1986, third place in 1987 and semi finalist in 2004. Jerico joined IE as Deputy Coach from 1989 to 1992. He then coached Junior Professionals for five seasons (1993–1998). Jerico promoted Junior Pros to the first division and went on to finished as runners-up in his first season before lifting the league title in 1997. He took Jr. Pros to the African Cup Winners, at which time the club ousted ASFAG of Guinea (but could not continue due to the April 6, 1996 fighting in Monrovia). Jerico led Jr. Pros to the African Champions League, and eliminated RCB of Burkina Faso, but were eliminated by eventual grand finalist Obuasi Goldfields a year later. During the 1997–1998 season, Adolph Lawrence hired him at a time Saint Anthony was in search of first division qualification. Jerico did not fail in winning all the seven matches he had. In his debut year with Saint Anthony in division one, Jerico led the club to second place in both league and knockout championships. Jerico had two stints with the Lone Star as Deputy Coach. His first stint ran from 1996 to 1998. On the second occasion, Lone Star reached the 2002 Nations Cup finals in Mali and nearly qualified for the World Cup the same year. A year earlier, Jerico and the Lone Star won the Goodwill Tournament in Côte d'Ivoire. The LFA awarded Jerico five times as Coach of the Year in 1985, 1987, 1996, 2000 and 2004. In 1985, the NPA Anchors coach attended the FIFA Youth Training Program conducted by Karl Heinz Moroski of Germany and Mohammed El Wash of Egypt (CAF). He also participated in the FIFA Futuro II course conducted by Philip Rouon in 1999. Currently, No Bad Day football club, a third division club in Liberia is seeking support from Jericho for partnership.
