= Jericho Creek (Laughery Creek tributary) =

- Location within the United States Location within Indiana

Location
- Country: United States
- State: Indiana
- County: Ripley County

Physical characteristics
- Source
  - location: Ripley County, Indiana, United States
  - coordinates: 39°10′46″N 85°17′39″W
- Mouth
  - location: Ripley County, Indiana, United States
  - coordinates: 39°10′37″N 85°15′18″W
  - elevation: 850 ft (260 m)

Jericho Creek is a tributary of Laughery Creek in Ripley County, Indiana.
