= 2027 U-17 Africa Cup of Nations qualification =

Tournament details
- Host countries: Tunisia (North Zone); Senegal (West A Zone); Burkina Faso (West B Zone); TBD (Central Zone); Rwanda (Central-East Zone); TBD (South Zone)
- Dates: 7 September 2026 –
- Teams: 48

The 2027 U-17 Africa Cup of Nations qualification is a men's under-17 football competition that decided the participating teams of the 2027 U-17 Africa Cup of Nations.

Players born on 1 January 2010 or later are eligible to participate in the competition. A total of sixteen teams qualified to play in the final tournament.

== Teams ==
Zone	Spots	Teams entering qualification	Did not enter
North Zone (UNAF)	3 spots	**Algeria**; **Egypt**; ~~Libya~~ **(W)**; **Morocco**; Tunisia	
West A Zone (WAFU-UFOA A)	3 spots	**Gambia**; **Guinea**; ~~Guinea-Bissau~~ **(D)**; Liberia; Mali; Mauritania; **Senegal**; Sierra Leone	Cape Verde
West B Zone (WAFU-UFOA B)	2 spots	Benin; Burkina Faso; Ghana; **Ivory Coast**; **Niger**; Nigeria; Togo	
Central Zone (UNIFFAC)	2 spots	Cameroon; Central African Republic; Congo; DR Congo; Gabon; Equatorial Guinea	Chad; São Tomé and Príncipe
Central-East Zone (CECAFA)	3 spots	Burundi; ~~Djibouti~~ **(W)**; Ethiopia; Kenya; **Rwanda**; **Somalia**; South Sudan; Sudan; Tanzania; **Uganda**	Eritrea
South Zone (COSAFA)	3 spots	Angola; Botswana; Comoros; Eswatini; Lesotho; Madagascar; Malawi; Mauritius; Mozambique; South Africa; Zambia; Zimbabwe	Namibia; Seychelles

Notes

- Teams in **bold** qualified for the final tournament.
- (W): Withdrew after draw
- (D): Disqualified

== North Zone ==
Pos	Team	Pld	W	D	L	GF	GA	GD	Pts	Qualification
1	Algeria	3	2	0	1	3	4	−1	6	Final tournament
2	Egypt	3	2	0	1	3	2	+1	6	Final tournament
3	Morocco	3	1	0	2	5	3	+2	3	Final tournament as the host nation
4	Tunisia (H)	3	1	0	2	6	8	−2	3	

Source: UNAF
(H) Hosts
10 November 2026
14:00

Algeria	1–0	Morocco
Ziane 41'	Report

Sousse Olympic Stadium, Sousse
Referee: Abdulrahman Adoum (Chad)
10 November 2026
17:00

Tunisia	1–2	Egypt
Zribi 20'	Report	Shaboun 9', 89'

Sousse Olympic Stadium, Sousse
Referee: Abdelouahed Haridioua (Libya)

13 November 2026
14:00

Tunisia	4–1	Algeria
Hassan 36', 65'; Kahrmani 73' (pen.); Ben Hssine 89'	Report	Abed 23'

Sousse Olympic Stadium, Sousse
Referee: Naoufel Nachit (Morocco)
13 November 2026
17:00

Egypt	1–0	Morocco
Ali 11'	Report

Sousse Olympic Stadium, Sousse
Referee: Rafik Aouina (Algeria)

16 November 2026
14:00

Tunisia	1–5	Morocco
Abdelbaki 60'	Report	Dabdoubi 24'; Ait Hammou 85'; Jadid 89', 90+2' (pen.), 90+4'

Sousse Olympic Stadium, Sousse
Referee: Mohamed Tabei Ghazi (Egypt)
16 November 2026
14:00

Algeria	1–0	Egypt
Daoud 8'	Report

Mustapha Ben Jannet Stadium, Monastir
Referee: Bassem Belaid (Tunisia)

== West A Zone ==
The WAFU-UFOA Zone A qualifiers for the U-17 Africa Cup of Nations were hosted by Senegal, with the matches played between 7 and 20 September 2026. The matches were played in Dakar.

=== Group stage ===
The eight teams were drawn into two groups of four teams. The winners and the runners-up of each group advanced to the semi-finals.

==== Tiebreakers ====
Teams were ranked according to the three points for a win system (3 points for a win, 1 for a draw, 0 points for a loss), and if two teams were tied on points, the following tiebreaking criteria were applied, in the order given, to determine the rankings (Regulations Article 13):

1. Points in head-to-head matches match between the two tied teams;
2. Goal difference in all group matches;
3. Goals scored in all group matches;
4. Drawing of lots.

If more than two teams were tied, the following criteria were applied instead:

1. Points in matches between the tied teams;
2. Goal difference in matches between the tied teams;
3. Goals scored in matches between the tied teams;
4. If after applying all criteria above, two teams were still tied, the above criteria were again applied to matches played between the two teams in question. If this did not resolve the tie, the next three criteria were applied;
5. Goal difference in all group matches;
6. Goals scored in all group matches;
7. Drawing of lots.

==== Group A ====
Pos	Team	Pld	W	D	L	GF	GA	GD	Pts	Qualification
1	Senegal (H)	3	2	1	0	9	0	+9	7	Semi-finals
2	Gambia	3	2	1	0	7	2	+5	7	Semi-finals
3	Mauritania	3	0	1	2	1	7	−6	1	
4	Sierra Leone	3	0	1	2	1	9	−8	1	

Source: CAF
(H) Hosts
7 September 2026
16:00

Senegal	4–0	Mauritania
Sy 37+1', 69'; Faye 48'; Ndiaye 87'	Report

Abdoulaye Wade Stadium, Diamniadio
7 September 2026
19:00

Gambia	4–1	Sierra Leone
Saine 9' (pen.), 13' (pen.); Touray 20'; Jatta 76'	Report	Bangura 3'

Abdoulaye Wade Stadium, Diamniadio

10 September 2026
16:00

Mauritania	1–3	Gambia
49'	Report	Saine 13'; Badjie 78'; Jatta 90+4'

Stade Lat-Dior, Thiès
10 September 2026
19:00

Sierra Leone	0–5	Senegal
	Report	Faye 15'; Sy 32', 38' (pen.); Seck 51'; Ba 82'

Stade Lat-Dior, Thiès

13 September 2026
16:00

Senegal	0–0	Gambia
	Report

Stade Lat-Dior, Thiès
13 September 2026
16:00

Mauritania	0–0	Sierra Leone
	Report

Stade Djagaly Bagayoko, Dakar

==== Group B ====
Pos	Team	Pld	W	D	L	GF	GA	GD	Pts	Qualification
1	Liberia	2	1	1	0	3	2	+1	4	Semi-finals
2	Guinea	2	1	0	1	3	3	0	3	Semi-finals
3	Mali	2	0	1	1	2	3	−1	1	

Source: CAF

Guinea-Bissau was also drawn into this group but were disqualified from the qualifiers after a few of their players failed to pass the MRI test.

8 September 2026
16:00

Mali	1–1	Liberia
Sangaré 90'	Report	Smith 56'

Abdoulaye Wade Stadium, Diamniadio

11 September 2026
16:00

Liberia	2–1	Guinea
Putu 19'; Smith 78' (pen.)	Report	Bangoura 47'

Stade Lat-Dior, Thiès

14 September 2026
16:00

Mali	1–2	Guinea
Keita 2'	Report	S. Camara 30'; A. Camara 72'

Stade Lat-Dior, Thiès

=== Knockout stage ===
==== Bracket ====
Semi-finals
17 September
Senegal	3
Guinea	0
17 September
Liberia	1
Gambia	2

Final
20 September
Senegal	0 (3)
Gambia (p)	0 (5)
Third place
20 September
Guinea	2
Liberia	0

==== Semi-finals ====
The semi-final winners qualified for the 2027 U-17 Africa Cup of Nations.

17 September 2026
17:00

Senegal	3–0	Guinea
Ndiaye 13'; Faye 85'; Thior 90+1'	Report

Leopold Sédar Senghor Stadium, Dakar

17 September 2026
20:00

Liberia	1–2	Gambia
Kamara 86'	Report	Saine 15'; Badjie 67'

Leopold Sédar Senghor Stadium, Dakar

==== Third place play-off ====
20 September 2026
17:00

Guinea	2–0	Liberia
Diallo 63', 76' (pen.)	Report

Leopold Sédar Senghor Stadium, Dakar

==== Final ====
20 September 2026
20:00

Senegal	0–0	Gambia
	Report
Penalties
	3–5

Leopold Sédar Senghor Stadium, Dakar

== West B Zone ==
The WAFU-UFOA Zone B qualifiers for the U-17 Africa Cup of Nations were hosted by Burkina Faso, with the matches played between 10 and 23 October 2026. The draw was announced on 3 September 2026.

=== Group stage ===
The seven teams were drawn into two groups of three and four teams. The winners and the runners-up of each group advanced to the semi-finals.

==== Tiebreakers ====
Teams were ranked according to the three points for a win system (3 points for a win, 1 for a draw, 0 points for a loss), and if two teams were tied on points, the following tiebreaking criteria were applied, in the order given, to determine the rankings (Regulations Article 13):

1. Points in head-to-head matches match between the two tied teams;
2. Goal difference in all group matches;
3. Goals scored in all group matches;
4. Drawing of lots.

If more than two teams were tied, the following criteria were applied instead:

1. Points in matches between the tied teams;
2. Goal difference in matches between the tied teams;
3. Goals scored in matches between the tied teams;
4. If after applying all criteria above, two teams were still tied, the above criteria were again applied to matches played between the two teams in question. If this did not resolve the tie, the next three criteria were applied;
5. Goal difference in all group matches;
6. Goals scored in all group matches;
7. Drawing of lots.

==== Group A ====
Pos	Team	Pld	W	D	L	GF	GA	GD	Pts	Qualification
1	Ghana	3	2	1	0	4	1	+3	7	Semi-finals
2	Burkina Faso (H)	3	1	2	0	1	0	+1	5	Semi-finals
3	Benin	3	1	1	1	3	3	0	4	
4	Togo	3	0	0	3	0	4	−4	0	

Source: CAF
(H) Hosts
10 October 2026
15:00

Burkina Faso	0–0	Benin
	Report

4 August Stadium, Ouagadougou
Referee: Toure Ben Ali (Ivory Coast)
10 October 2026
18:00

Ghana	1–0	Togo
Kwarteng 9'	Report

4 August Stadium, Ouagadougou
Referee: Ahmadou Alou Moussa (Niger)

13 October 2026
16:00

Benin	1–3	Ghana
Mevowanou 31'	Report	Alidu 4', 10'; Odoi 81'

4 August Stadium, Ouagadougou
Referee: Abubarkar Nurudeen (Nigeria)
13 October 2026
19:00

Togo	0–1	Burkina Faso
	Report	Abdou 66'

4 August Stadium, Ouagadougou
Referee: Khaled Gouider (Tunisia)

16 October 2026
16:00

Burkina Faso	0–0	Ghana
	Report

4 August Stadium, Ouagadougou
Referee: Donatien Kofitse Yena (Togo)
16 October 2026
16:00

Togo	0–2	Benin
	Report	Abel 46'; Sankamao 88'

Terrain Focus Sport, Ouagadougou
Referee: Toure Ben Ali (Ivory Coast)

==== Group B ====
Pos	Team	Pld	W	D	L	GF	GA	GD	Pts	Qualification
1	Niger	2	1	1	0	3	2	+1	4	Semi-finals
2	Ivory Coast	2	0	2	0	2	2	0	2	Semi-finals
3	Nigeria	2	0	1	1	2	3	−1	1	

Source: CAF
11 October 2026
16:00

Ivory Coast	1–1	Niger
Christ 56'	Report	Aboubacar 17'

4 August Stadium, Ouagadougou
Referee: Selorm Yao Bless (Ghana)

14 October 2026
16:00

Niger	2–1	Nigeria
Razak 19'; Rakilou 86'	Report	Fasiu 90+5'

4 August Stadium, Ouagadougou
Referee: Bassadin H. Romuald (Benin)

17 October 2026
16:00

Nigeria	1–1	Ivory Coast
John 84'	Report	Fousseni 16'

4 August Stadium, Ouagadougou
Referee: Bado Benoit (Burkina Faso)

=== Knockout stage ===
==== Bracket ====
Semi-finals
20 October
Ghana	0
Ivory Coast	1
20 October
Niger	1
Burkina Faso	0

Final
23 October
Ivory Coast	2 (1)
Niger (p)	2 (3)
Third place
23 October
Ghana	0
Burkina Faso	2

==== Semi-finals ====
The semi-final winners qualified for the 2027 U-17 Africa Cup of Nations.

20 October 2026
16:00

Ghana	0–1	Ivory Coast
	Report	Fousseni Bamba 77'

4 August Stadium, Ouagadougou
Referee: Khaled Gouider (Tunisia)

20 October 2026
19:30

Niger	1–0	Burkina Faso
Rakilou 61'	Report

4 August Stadium, Ouagadougou
Referee: Donatien Kofitse Yena (Togo)

==== Third place play-off ====
23 October 2026
16:00

Ghana	0–2	Burkina Faso
	Report	Soubeiga 23'; Kabore 75'

4 August Stadium, Ouagadougou
Referee: Abubarkar Nurudeen (Nigeria)

==== Final ====
23 October 2026
19:30

Ivory Coast	2–2	Niger
Ruben 21'; Christ 67'	Report	Hamidou 52'; Rakilou 85'
Penalties
	1–3

4 August Stadium, Ouagadougou
Referee: Bado Benoit (Burkina Faso)

== See also ==
- 2027 U-20 Africa Cup of Nations qualification
