= 2027 U-20 Africa Cup of Nations qualification =

Tournament details
- Host countries: Egypt (North Zone); Mali (West A Zone); Ivory Coast (West B Zone); Cameroon (Central Zone); Tanzania (Central-East Zone); Mozambique (South Zone)
- Dates: 26 July – 24 October
- Teams: 48

The 2027 U-20 Africa Cup of Nations qualification was a men's under-20 football competition that decided the participating teams of the 2027 U-20 Africa Cup of Nations.

Players born on 1 January 2007 or later were eligible to participate in the competition. A total of twelve teams qualified to play in the final tournament.

== Teams ==
| Zone | Spots | Teams entering qualification | Did not enter |
|---|---|---|---|
| North Zone (UNAF) | 2 spots | Algeria; **Egypt**; Libya; **Morocco**; Tunisia | |
| West A Zone (WAFU-UFOA A) | 2 spots | **Gambia**; **Guinea**; ~~Guinea-Bissau~~ **(W)**; Liberia; Mali; Mauritania; Senegal; Sierra Leone | Cape Verde |
| West B Zone (WAFU-UFOA B) | 2 spots | Benin; **Burkina Faso**; **Ghana**; Ivory Coast; Niger; Nigeria; Togo | |
| Central Zone (UNIFFAC) | 2 spots | **Cameroon**; **Central African Republic**; Chad; Congo; DR Congo; Gabon | Equatorial Guinea; São Tomé and Príncipe |
| Central-East Zone (CECAFA) | 2 spots | Burundi; Djibouti; Ethiopia; Kenya; Rwanda; South Sudan; **Sudan**; **Tanzania**; Uganda | Eritrea; Somalia |
| South Zone (COSAFA) | 2 spots | Angola; Botswana; Comoros; Eswatini; Lesotho; Mauritius; Malawi; **Mozambique**; Namibia; **South Africa**; Seychelles; Zambia | Madagascar; Zimbabwe |

Notes

- Teams in **bold** qualified for the final tournament.
- (W): Withdrew after draw

== Qualified teams ==
All twelve teams qualified for the final tournament following the WAFU A semi-finals on 25 October 2026.

| Zone | Qualified teams | Qualification method |
|---|---|---|
| West A (WAFU A) | Gambia; Guinea | Zonal tournament finalists |
| West B (WAFU B) | Ghana | Hosts |
| West B (WAFU B) | Burkina Faso | Zonal tournament winners |
| North (UNAF) | Egypt; Morocco | Zonal tournament top two |
| Central (UNIFFAC) | Cameroon; Central African Republic | Zonal tournament finalists |
| Central-East (CECAFA) | Sudan; Tanzania | Zonal tournament finalists |
| South (COSAFA) | South Africa; Mozambique | Zonal tournament finalists |

== North Zone ==
The 2026 UNAF U-20 Tournament, which also served as the qualifiers for the U-20 Africa Cup of Nations, took place between 24 September and 6 October in Egypt. The five teams were placed in one group, with the winner and the runner-up qualifying for the final tournament.

All times are local, EST, CAT (UTC+2).

| Pos | Team | Pld | W | D | L | GF | GA | GD | Pts | Qualification |
|---|---|---|---|---|---|---|---|---|---|---|
| 1 | Egypt (H) | 4 | 3 | 0 | 1 | 6 | 3 | +3 | 9 | 2027 U-20 Africa Cup of Nations |
| 2 | Morocco | 4 | 2 | 1 | 1 | 7 | 4 | +3 | 7 | 2027 U-20 Africa Cup of Nations |
| 3 | Algeria | 4 | 1 | 1 | 2 | 5 | 7 | −2 | 4 (Note: Head-to-head result: Libya 1–3 Algeria.) | |
| 4 | Libya | 4 | 1 | 1 | 2 | 5 | 8 | −3 | 4 | |
| 5 | Tunisia | 4 | 0 | 3 | 1 | 3 | 4 | −1 | 3 | |

Source: UNAF
Rules for classification: 1) Points; 2) Goal difference; 3) Goals scored
(H) Hosts
Notes:
24 September 2026
16:30

| Algeria | 1–1 | Tunisia |
|---|---|---|
| Seddik 9' | Report | Marchal 30' (o.g.) |

Suez Canal Stadium, Ismailia
24 September 2026
20:00

| Egypt | 2–0 | Libya |
|---|---|---|
| Awad 19'; Hamdy 56' | Report |

Suez Canal Stadium, Ismailia

27 September 2026
16:30

| Libya | 1–3 | Algeria |
|---|---|---|
| Al Hamadi 90+4' | Report | Seddik 57'; Sellami 73'; Aïche 88' |

Suez Canal Stadium, Ismailia
27 September 2026
20:00

| Tunisia | 0–0 | Morocco |
|---|---|---|
| | Report |

Suez Canal Stadium, Ismailia

30 September 2026
16:30

| Morocco | 3–1 | Algeria |
|---|---|---|
| Bouhoudane 53'; Mounssef 56'; Hidaoui 65' | Report | Mohamed 84' |

Suez Canal Stadium, Ismailia
30 September 2026
20:00

| Egypt | 2–1 | Tunisia |
|---|---|---|
| El Shamy 16' (pen.); Hamad 32' | Report | Saidi 66' |

Suez Canal Stadium, Ismailia

3 October 2026
16:30

| Tunisia | 1–1 | Libya |
|---|---|---|
| Brik 24' | Report | Ibrahim 64' |

Suez Canal Stadium, Ismailia
3 October 2026
20:00

| Egypt | 0–2 | Morocco |
|---|---|---|
| | Report | Baallal 25'; Bouhoudane 33' |

Suez Canal Stadium, Ismailia

6 October 2026
16:00

| Libya | 3–2 | Morocco |
|---|---|---|
| Abraheem 30'; Makkari 36' (pen.); Aboulteifa 67' | Report | Kasbi 18'; Mounssef 79' |

Suez Canal Stadium, Ismailia
6 October 2026
16:30

| Algeria | 0–2 | Egypt |
|---|---|---|
| | Report | Salah 22'; Roshdy 82' |

Ismailia Stadium, Ismailia

== West A Zone ==
The WAFU-UFOA Zone A qualifiers for the 2027 U-20 Africa Cup of Nations will be hosted by Mali, with the matches to be played between 15 and 30 October 2026 in Bamako, Mali. The draw was held on 1 October 2026 in Abidjan, Ivory Coast.

=== Group stage ===
The eight teams were drawn into two groups of four. The top two teams in each group will advance to the semi-finals.

==== Group A ====
| Pos | Team | Pld | W | D | L | GF | GA | GD | Pts | Qualification |
|---|---|---|---|---|---|---|---|---|---|---|
| 1 | Gambia | 3 | 2 | 1 | 0 | 3 | 1 | +2 | 7 | Semi-finals |
| 2 | Guinea | 3 | 2 | 0 | 1 | 3 | 2 | +1 | 6 | Semi-finals |
| 3 | Mali (H) | 3 | 1 | 0 | 2 | 3 | 2 | +1 | 3 | |
| 4 | Liberia | 3 | 0 | 1 | 2 | 0 | 4 | −4 | 1 | |

Source: CAF; WAFU A
(H) Hosts
15 October 2026
16:00

| Mali | 0–1 | Guinea |
|---|---|---|
| | Report | Keita 40' |

Mamadou Konaté Stadium, Bamako
15 October 2026
19:00

| Liberia | 0–0 | Gambia |
|---|---|---|
| | Report |

Mamadou Konaté Stadium, Bamako

18 October 2026
16:00

| Guinea | 1–0 | Liberia |
|---|---|---|
| Diallo 29' | Report |

Mamadou Konaté Stadium, Bamako
18 October 2026
19:00

| Gambia | 1–0 | Mali |
|---|---|---|
| Danjo 83' | Report |

Mamadou Konaté Stadium, Bamako

21 October 2026
16:00

| Mali | 3–0 | Liberia |
|---|---|---|
| Konare 15'; Nientao 25'; Boune 90+3' | Report |

Mamadou Konaté Stadium, Bamako
21 October 2026
19:00

| Guinea | 1–2 | Gambia |
|---|---|---|
| Camara 90' | Report | Dibba 8'; Gomez 55' |

Mamadou Konaté Stadium, Bamako

==== Group B ====
| Pos | Team | Pld | W | D | L | GF | GA | GD | Pts | Qualification |
|---|---|---|---|---|---|---|---|---|---|---|
| 1 | Senegal | 2 | 1 | 1 | 0 | 2 | 1 | +1 | 4 | Semi-finals |
| 2 | Sierra Leone | 2 | 0 | 2 | 0 | 2 | 2 | 0 | 2 | Semi-finals |
| 3 | Mauritania | 2 | 0 | 1 | 1 | 3 | 4 | −1 | 1 | |
| 4 | Guinea-Bissau | 0 | 0 | 0 | 0 | 0 | 0 | 0 | 0 | Withdrew |

Source: CAF

Guinea-Bissau was also drawn into this group, but withdrew before playing.

16 October 2026
16:00

| Senegal | 2–1 | Mauritania |
|---|---|---|
| Gueye 40', 86' | Report | Sow 13' |

Mamadou Konaté Stadium, Bamako
16 October 2026
19:00

| Sierra Leone | Cancelled | Guinea-Bissau |
|---|---|---|
| | Report |

Mamadou Konaté Stadium, Bamako

19 October 2026
16:00

| Mauritania | 2–2 | Sierra Leone |
|---|---|---|
| Sow 35'; El Hafedh 84' | Report | Mansaray 23'; Bah 90+2' |

Mamadou Konaté Stadium, Bamako
19 October 2026
19:00

| Guinea-Bissau | Cancelled | Senegal |
|---|---|---|
| | Report |

Mamadou Konaté Stadium, Bamako

22 October 2026
16:00

| Senegal | 0–0 | Sierra Leone |
|---|---|---|
| | Report |

Mamadou Konaté Stadium, Bamako
22 October 2026
19:00

| Guinea-Bissau | Cancelled | Mauritania |
|---|---|---|
| | Report |

Mamadou Konaté Stadium, Bamako

=== Knockout stage ===
==== Bracket ====
Semi-finals
25 October – Bamako
Gambia | 2
Sierra Leone | 0
25 October – Bamako
Senegal | 2
Guinea (a.e.t.) | 3

Final
30 October – Bamako
Gambia | 0
Guinea | 1
Third place play-off
30 October – Bamako
Sierra Leone | 2
Senegal | 2 (5–6 p)

==== Semi-finals ====
Winners qualified for the 2027 U-20 Africa Cup of Nations.

25 October 2026
16:00

| Gambia | 2–0 | Sierra Leone |
|---|---|---|
| Dibba 8'; Gomez 30' | Report |

Mamadou Konaté Stadium, Bamako
25 October 2026
19:00

| Senegal | 2–3 (a.e.t.) | Guinea |
|---|---|---|
| Gueye 45+4', 71' | Report | Camara 73'; Ndiaye 80', 113' |

Mamadou Konaté Stadium, Bamako

==== Third place play-off ====
30 October 2026
16:00

| Sierra Leone | 2–2 | Senegal |
|---|---|---|
| Bah 42'; Jalloh 46' | Report | Ndiaye 34'; Ba 62' |
Penalties
| | 5–6 |

Mamadou Konaté Stadium, Bamako

==== Final ====
30 October 2026
19:00

| Gambia | 0–1 | Guinea |
|---|---|---|
| | Report | Aboubacar 40' |

Mamadou Konaté Stadium, Bamako

== West B Zone ==
The WAFU-UFOA Zone B qualifiers for the 2027 U-20 Africa Cup of Nations were hosted by Ivory Coast, with the matches played between 26 July and 9 August 2026 at Yamoussoukro, Ivory Coast. The draw was held on 15 July 2026 in Abidjan, Ivory Coast. Ghana qualified automatically as hosts of the final tournament; the winners of this qualifying tournament claimed the zone's other berth.

=== Group stage ===
The seven teams were drawn into two groups, one of three and one of four teams. In both groups, the top two teams advanced to the semi-finals.

==== Group A ====
| Pos | Team | Pld | W | D | L | GF | GA | GD | Pts | Qualification |
|---|---|---|---|---|---|---|---|---|---|---|
| 1 | Ivory Coast (H) | 2 | 2 | 0 | 0 | 7 | 0 | +7 | 6 | Semi-finals |
| 2 | Niger | 2 | 1 | 0 | 1 | 1 | 2 | −1 | 3 | Semi-finals |
| 3 | Benin | 2 | 0 | 0 | 2 | 0 | 6 | −6 | 0 | |

Source: CAF
(H) Hosts
26 July 2026
14:00

| Ivory Coast | 5–0 | Benin |
|---|---|---|
| Roma 10'; Zagadou 18'; Keita 47'; Koutouan 61', 74' | Report |

Charles Konan Banny Stadium, Yamoussoukro

29 July 2026
14:00

| Niger | 1–0 | Benin |
|---|---|---|
| Aziz 71' | Report |

Charles Konan Banny Stadium, Yamoussoukro

1 August 2026
14:00

| Niger | 0–2 | Ivory Coast |
|---|---|---|
| | Report | Adje 56'; Keita 90+5' |

Lycée Scientifique, Yamoussoukro

==== Group B ====
| Pos | Team | Pld | W | D | L | GF | GA | GD | Pts | Qualification |
|---|---|---|---|---|---|---|---|---|---|---|
| 1 | Burkina Faso | 3 | 2 | 1 | 0 | 6 | 2 | +4 | 7 | Semi-finals |
| 2 | Nigeria | 3 | 2 | 0 | 1 | 7 | 4 | +3 | 6 | Semi-finals |
| 3 | Ghana | 3 | 0 | 2 | 1 | 3 | 5 | −2 | 2 | |
| 4 | Togo | 3 | 0 | 1 | 2 | 1 | 6 | −5 | 1 | |

Source: CAF
27 July 2026
14:00

| Nigeria | 4–2 | Ghana |
|---|---|---|
| Olayemi 4'; Oraro 32'; Adeleke 41' (pen.), 90+2' (pen.) | Report | Zaidan 23'; Nkrumah 62' (pen.) |

Charles Konan Banny Stadium, Yamoussoukro
27 July 2026
18:00

| Togo | 1–3 | Burkina Faso |
|---|---|---|
| Tokanou 15' | Report | Zongo 2'; Komi 49'; Ouédraogo 79' |

Charles Konan Banny Stadium, Yamoussoukro

30 July 2026
14:00

| Nigeria | 3–0 | Togo |
|---|---|---|
| Adeleke 47', 60'; Agbe Joye 86' | Report |

Lycée Scientifique, Yamoussoukro
30 July 2026
18:00

| Ghana | 1–1 | Burkina Faso |
|---|---|---|
| Badu 41' | Report | Tapsoba 34' |

Lycée Scientifique, Yamoussoukro

2 August 2026
14:00

| Nigeria | 0–2 | Burkina Faso |
|---|---|---|
| | Report | Bagayogo 23'; Zongo 37' |

Lycée Scientifique, Yamoussoukro
2 August 2026
14:00

| Ghana | 0–0 | Togo |
|---|---|---|
| | Report |

Charles Konan Banny Stadium, Yamoussoukro

=== Knockout stage ===
==== Bracket ====
Semi-finals
5 August – Yamoussoukro
Ivory Coast | 2
Nigeria | 2 (4–3 p)
5 August – Yamoussoukro
Burkina Faso | 2
Niger | 0 (a.e.t.)

Final
9 August – Yamoussoukro
Nigeria | 1
Burkina Faso | 4
Third place play-off
9 August – Yamoussoukro
Ivory Coast | 0
Niger | 0 (3–4 p)

==== Semi-finals ====
5 August 2026
14:00

| Ivory Coast | 2–2 (a.e.t.) | Nigeria |
|---|---|---|
| Keita 18', 105' | Report | Simeon 68'; Aliyu 91' |
Penalties
| | 3–4 |

Charles Konan Banny Stadium, Yamoussoukro

5 August 2026
18:00

| Burkina Faso | 2–0 (a.e.t.) | Niger |
|---|---|---|
| Ouattara 102'; Diakite 120+2' | Report |

Charles Konan Banny Stadium, Yamoussoukro

==== Third place play-off ====
9 August 2026
14:00

| Ivory Coast | 0–0 (a.e.t.) | Niger |
|---|---|---|
| | Report |
Penalties
| | 3–4 |

Charles Konan Banny Stadium, Yamoussoukro

==== Final ====
The winner qualified for 2027 U-20 Africa Cup of Nations.

9 August 2026
18:00

| Nigeria | 1–4 | Burkina Faso |
|---|---|---|
| Adeleke 50' (pen.) | Report | Bagayogo 3'; Tapsoba 5'; Dabo 14'; Barro 90+4' |

Charles Konan Banny Stadium, Yamoussoukro

== Central Zone ==
The UNIFFAC Zone qualifiers for the 2027 U-20 Africa Cup of Nations will be hosted by Cameroon, with the matches to be played from 12 to 24 October 2026 in Yaoundé, Cameroon. The draw was held on 5 October 2026 in Yaoundé, Cameroon.

=== Group stage ===
The six teams were drawn into two groups. In both groups, the top two teams will advance to the semi-finals.

==== Group A ====
| Pos | Team | Pld | W | D | L | GF | GA | GD | Pts | Qualification |
|---|---|---|---|---|---|---|---|---|---|---|
| 1 | Cameroon (H) | 2 | 2 | 0 | 0 | 5 | 0 | +5 | 6 | Semi-finals |
| 2 | Central African Republic | 2 | 0 | 1 | 1 | 1 | 3 | −2 | 1 | Semi-finals |
| 3 | Chad | 2 | 0 | 1 | 1 | 1 | 4 | −3 | 1 | |

Source: SportyTV
(H) Hosts
12 October 2026
13:00

| Cameroon | 3–0 | Chad |
|---|---|---|
| Manguele 2'; Fonyuy Achu 15' (pen.), 23' | Report |

Olembe Stadium, Yaoundé
15 October 2026
13:00

| Central African Republic | 1–1 | Chad |
|---|---|---|
| Koyaboko 50' | Report | Nadjitensem 60' |

Olembe Stadium, Yaoundé
18 October 2026
13:00

| Cameroon | 2–0 | Central African Republic |
|---|---|---|
| Fonyuy Achu 9', 62' | Report |

Olembe Stadium, Yaoundé

==== Group B ====
| Pos | Team | Pld | W | D | L | GF | GA | GD | Pts | Qualification |
|---|---|---|---|---|---|---|---|---|---|---|
| 1 | Congo | 2 | 0 | 2 | 0 | 2 | 2 | 0 | 2 | Semi-finals |
| 2 | Gabon | 2 | 0 | 2 | 0 | 1 | 1 | 0 | 2 (Note: Tied on head-to-head, points, goal difference, and goals scored. Gabon were drawn over DR Congo by UNIFFAC, according to the regulations of the tournament.) | Semi-finals |
| 3 | DR Congo | 2 | 0 | 2 | 0 | 1 | 1 | 0 | 2 | |

Source: SportyTV
Notes:
12 October 2026
16:00

| DR Congo | 0–0 | Gabon |
|---|---|---|
| | Report |

Olembe Stadium, Yaoundé
15 October 2026
16:00

| Congo | 1–1 | Gabon |
|---|---|---|
| Bouangui 78' | Report | Bouleme 69' |

Olembe Stadium, Yaoundé
18 October 2026
16:00

| DR Congo | 1–1 | Congo |
|---|---|---|
| Massey 23' | Report | Bouesso 80' |

Ahmadou Ahidjo Stadium, Yaoundé

=== Knockout stage ===
==== Bracket ====
Semi-finals
21 October – Yaoundé
Cameroon | 4
Gabon | 1
21 October – Yaoundé
Congo | 0
Central African Republic | 2

Final
24 October
Cameroon | 1
Central African Republic | 0
Third place play-off
24 October
Congo | 2
Gabon | 0

==== Semi-finals ====
Winners qualified for the 2027 U-20 Africa Cup of Nations.

21 October 2026
13:00

| Congo | 0–2 | Central African Republic |
|---|---|---|
| | Report | Reckian Bemkom 45'; Zande 87' |

Olembe Stadium, Yaoundé
21 October 2026
16:00

| Cameroon | 4–1 | Gabon |
|---|---|---|
| Songue 59', 90+2'; Fonyuy Achu 78' (pen.); Bengono 90+4' | Report | Litombo 50' (pen.) |

Olembe Stadium, Yaoundé

==== Third place play-off ====
24 October 2026
13:00

| Congo | 2–0 | Gabon |
|---|---|---|
| Wumba Niati Tsimba 68' (pen.), 87' (pen.) | Report |

Olembe Stadium, Yaoundé

==== Final ====
24 October 2026
16:00

| Cameroon | 1–0 | Central African Republic |
|---|---|---|
| Manguele 20' | Report |

Olembe Stadium, Yaoundé

== Central-East Zone ==
The CECAFA qualifiers for the U-20 Africa Cup of Nations are hosted by Tanzania between 15 and 25 September 2026.

=== Group stage ===
The 9 teams were drawn into three groups of three teams. The winners and the best runner-up advanced to the semi-finals.

==== Group A ====
| Pos | Team | Pld | W | D | L | GF | GA | GD | Pts | Qualification |
|---|---|---|---|---|---|---|---|---|---|---|
| 1 | Tanzania (H) | 2 | 2 | 0 | 0 | 7 | 0 | +7 | 6 | Semi-finals |
| 2 | Rwanda | 2 | 0 | 1 | 1 | 0 | 3 | −3 | 1 | |
| 3 | Ethiopia | 2 | 0 | 1 | 1 | 0 | 4 | −4 | 1 | |

Source: CECAFA
(H) Hosts
15 September 2026
20:00

| Tanzania | 3–0 | Rwanda |
|---|---|---|
| Kayanda 30'; Abushiri 38'; Lukanima 42' |

Uhuru Stadium, Dar es Salaam
Referee: Dickens Mimisa (Kenya)

17 September 2026
14:00

| Rwanda | 0–0 | Ethiopia |

Uhuru Stadium, Dar es Salaam
Referee: Nasser Houssein (Djibouti)

19 September 2026
20:00

| Ethiopia | 0–4 | Tanzania |
|---|---|---|
| | | Kibaila 30', 45'; Sagwe 53', 57' |

Uhuru Stadium, Dar es Salaam
Referee: Dickens Mimisa (Kenya)

==== Group B ====
| Pos | Team | Pld | W | D | L | GF | GA | GD | Pts | Qualification |
|---|---|---|---|---|---|---|---|---|---|---|
| 1 | Uganda | 2 | 2 | 0 | 0 | 5 | 1 | +4 | 6 | Semi-finals |
| 2 | Sudan | 2 | 1 | 0 | 1 | 3 | 1 | +2 | 3 | Semi-finals |
| 3 | Djibouti | 2 | 0 | 0 | 2 | 1 | 7 | −6 | 0 | |

Source: CECAFA
15 September 2026
14:00

| Uganda | 4–1 | Djibouti |
|---|---|---|
| Magala 5', 62'; Odiya 44'; Okello 58' | | Tahir 24' |

Uhuru Stadium, Dar es Salaam
Referee: Ephrame Debele (Ethiopia)

17 September 2026
17:00

| Djibouti | 0–3 | Sudan |
|---|---|---|
| | | Omer 8', 85'; Saman 52' |

Uhuru Stadium, Dar es Salaam
Referee: Celestin Nsabimana (Rwanda)

19 September 2026
17:00

| Sudan | 0–1 | Uganda |
|---|---|---|
| | | Munogera 70' |

Uhuru Stadium, Dar es Salaam
Referee: Anthony Kiri (South Sudan)

==== Group C ====
| Pos | Team | Pld | W | D | L | GF | GA | GD | Pts | Qualification |
|---|---|---|---|---|---|---|---|---|---|---|
| 1 | Burundi | 2 | 2 | 0 | 0 | 6 | 0 | +6 | 6 | Semi-finals |
| 2 | Kenya | 2 | 0 | 1 | 1 | 1 | 3 | −2 | 1 | |
| 3 | South Sudan | 2 | 0 | 1 | 1 | 1 | 5 | −4 | 1 | |

Source: CECAFA
15 September 2026
17:00

| South Sudan | 0–4 | Burundi |
|---|---|---|
| | | Nshimirimana 40', 45+1'; Majidi 75', 77' |

Uhuru Stadium, Dar es Salaam
Referee: Joshua Duula (Uganda)

17 September 2026
20:00

| Burundi | 2–0 | Kenya |
|---|---|---|
| Nshimirimana 11', 70' |

Uhuru Stadium, Dar es Salaam
Referee: Amro Ismail (Sudan)

19 September 2026
14:00

| Kenya | 1–1 | South Sudan |
|---|---|---|
| Nacheri 90+4' | | Ajoung 27' |

Uhuru Stadium, Dar es Salaam
Referee: Herry Sasii (Tanzania)

=== Knockout stage ===
==== Bracket ====
Semi-finals
22 September – Dar es Salaam
Uganda | 2
Sudan | 3
22 September – Dar es Salaam
Tanzania | 2
Burundi | 0

Final
24 September – Dar es Salaam
Sudan | 1 (4–3 p)
Tanzania | 1 (a.e.t.)
Third place play-off
24 September – Dar es Salaam
Uganda | 2
Burundi | 0

==== Semi-finals ====
Winners qualified for 2027 U-20 Africa Cup of Nations.

22 September 2026
12:30

| Uganda | 2–3 | Sudan |
|---|---|---|
| Okello 7'; Ssozi 66' | | Mohamed 10'; Somi 48'; Albahli Taowr 82' |

Uhuru Stadium, Dar es Salaam
Referee: Dickens Mimisa (Kenya)

22 September 2026
16:00

| Tanzania | 2–0 | Burundi |
|---|---|---|
| Abushiri 14'; Kayanda 30' |

Uhuru Stadium, Dar es Salaam
Referee: Ephrame Debele (Ethiopia)

==== Third place play-off ====
24 September 2026
11:30

| Uganda | 2–0 | Burundi |
|---|---|---|
| Ssozi 22'; Kyakuwa 83' |

Uhuru Stadium, Dar es Salaam
Referee: Herry Sasii (Tanzania)

==== Final ====
24 September 2026
14:30

| Tanzania | 1–1 (a.e.t.) | Sudan |
|---|---|---|
| Abdallah 110' | | Hamd Ahmed 92' |
Penalties
| | 3–4 |

Uhuru Stadium, Dar es Salaam
Referee: Nasser Houssein (Djibouti)

== South Zone ==
=== Group stage ===
==== Group A ====
| Pos | Team | Pld | W | D | L | GF | GA | GD | Pts | Qualification |
|---|---|---|---|---|---|---|---|---|---|---|
| 1 | Namibia | 3 | 3 | 0 | 0 | 5 | 0 | +5 | 9 | Semi-finals |
| 2 | Mozambique | 3 | 2 | 0 | 1 | 9 | 2 | +7 | 6 | Semi-finals |
| 3 | Seychelles | 3 | 1 | 0 | 2 | 5 | 10 | −5 | 3 | |
| 4 | Mauritius | 3 | 0 | 0 | 3 | 3 | 10 | −7 | 0 | |

Source: COSAFA
18 September 2026
12:00

| Mauritius | 0–1 | Namibia |
|---|---|---|
| | Report | Sakeus 43' |

Zimpeto Stadium, Maputo
Referee: Keabetswe Dintwa (Botswana)
18 September 2026
18:00

| Mozambique | 4–1 | Seychelles |
|---|---|---|
| Macuácua 19'; Cuna 29', 57'; Abdala 77' | Report | Rajabary 5' |

Zimpeto Stadium, Maputo
Referee: David Chinoko (Malawi)

20 September 2026
12:00

| Mauritius | 3–4 | Seychelles |
|---|---|---|
| Lalsing 21', 90+4'; Ravina 53' (pen.) | Report | Hoareau 27' (pen.), 60' (pen.), 71'; Barbe 82' |

ABB Stadium (Pitch 2), Maputo
Referee: Keabetswe Dintwa (Botswana)
20 September 2026
15:00

| Mozambique | 0–1 | Namibia |
|---|---|---|
| | Report | Naobeb 18' |

ABB Stadium (Pitch 2), Maputo
Referee: Arnaud Zafimahatoha (Madagascar)

22 September 2026
15:00

| Seychelles | 0–3 | Namibia |
|---|---|---|
| | Report | Naobeb 15'; Ashitenda 62'; Sakeus 78' |

ABB Stadium (Pitch 2), Maputo
Referee: Arnaud Zafimahatoha (Madagascar)
22 September 2026
15:00

| Mozambique | 5–0 | Mauritius |
|---|---|---|
| Cuna 12', 19', 77'; Machel 25'; Romão 90+6' | Report |

ABB Stadium (Pitch 1), Maputo
Referee: Charles Ng'andwe (Zambia)

==== Group B ====
| Pos | Team | Pld | W | D | L | GF | GA | GD | Pts | Qualification |
|---|---|---|---|---|---|---|---|---|---|---|
| 1 | South Africa | 3 | 3 | 0 | 0 | 7 | 0 | +7 | 9 | Semi-finals |
| 2 | Angola | 3 | 2 | 0 | 1 | 9 | 2 | +7 | 6 | |
| 3 | Eswatini | 3 | 1 | 0 | 2 | 3 | 8 | −5 | 3 | |
| 4 | Lesotho | 3 | 0 | 0 | 3 | 2 | 11 | −9 | 0 | |

Source: COSAFA
19 September 2026
12:00

| South Africa | 3–0 | Lesotho |
|---|---|---|
| Mendes 45+1', 60'; Mlangeni 65' | Report |

Zimpeto Stadium, Maputo
Referee: Celso Alvação (Mozambique)
19 September 2026
15:00

| Angola | 4–0 | Eswatini |
|---|---|---|
| Muxito 21'; Kulica 35'; Muanha 45'; Luisinho 50' | Report |

Zimpeto Stadium, Maputo
Referee: Lominson Todihajaniaina (Madagascar)

21 September 2026
15:00

| South Africa | 2–0 | Angola |
|---|---|---|
| Maku 14'; Mendes 41' | Report |

ABB Stadium (Pitch 1), Maputo
Referee: Eness Gumbo (Malawi)
21 September 2026
18:00

| Eswatini | 3–2 | Lesotho |
|---|---|---|
| Gama 13', 90+1'; Malaza 42' | Report | Kalache 30'; Tuoane 90' |

ABB Stadium (Pitch 1), Maputo
Referee: Akhona Makalima (South Africa)

23 September 2026
12:00

| South Africa | 2–0 | Eswatini |
|---|---|---|
| Mazibuko 25'; Nalumango 34' | Report |

ABB Stadium (Pitch 1), Maputo
Referee: Keabetswe Dintwa (Botswana)
23 September 2026
12:00

| Lesotho | 0–5 | Angola |
|---|---|---|
| | Report | Muanha 6'; Luisinho 13', 19' (pen.); Romano 37', 86' |

ABB Stadium (Pitch 2), Maputo
Referee: Mweshitsama Negongo (Namibia)

==== Group C ====
| Pos | Team | Pld | W | D | L | GF | GA | GD | Pts | Qualification |
|---|---|---|---|---|---|---|---|---|---|---|
| 1 | Zambia | 3 | 3 | 0 | 0 | 8 | 1 | +7 | 9 | Semi-finals |
| 2 | Malawi | 3 | 2 | 0 | 1 | 5 | 3 | +2 | 6 | |
| 3 | Comoros | 3 | 0 | 1 | 2 | 1 | 5 | −4 | 1 | |
| 4 | Botswana | 3 | 0 | 1 | 2 | 1 | 6 | −5 | 1 | |

Source: COSAFA
18 September 2026
15:00

| Zambia | 2–0 | Malawi |
|---|---|---|
| Daka 80', 90+8' | Report |

Zimpeto Stadium, Maputo
Referee: Eugine Mdluli (South Africa)
19 September 2026
18:00

| Comoros | 0–0 | Botswana |
|---|---|---|
| | Report |

Zimpeto Stadium, Maputo
Referee: Akhona Makalima (South Africa)

21 September 2026
11:00

| Zambia | 3–0 | Comoros |
|---|---|---|
| Mununga 5'; Nyirongo 17'; Chinunda 64' | Report | I. Abdallah (red card) 45+5'; Othman (red card) 71' |

ABB Stadium (Pitch 2), Maputo
Referee: Mweshitsama Negongo (Namibia)
21 September 2026
14:00

| Botswana | 0–3 | Malawi |
|---|---|---|
| Seleke (red card) 29' | Report | Billiat 22'; Kalambo 45+3'; Chibalo 90+3' |

ABB Stadium (Pitch 2), Maputo
Referee: Sanele Ntimane (Eswatini)

23 September 2026
15:00

| Zambia | 3–1 | Botswana |
|---|---|---|
| Silubonde 9', 64'; Foloko 90+1' | Report | Murandu 47' |

ABB Stadium (Pitch 1), Maputo
Referee: Eugine Mdluli (South Africa)
23 September 2026
15:00

| Malawi | 2–1 | Comoros |
|---|---|---|
| Issilamou-Hamza 90+3' (o.g.); Yasini 90+6' | Report | Moussa 23' |

ABB Stadium (Pitch 2), Maputo
Referee: Akhona Makalima (South Africa)

=== Knockout stage ===
==== Bracket ====
Semi-finals
25 September – Maputo
South Africa | 4
Zambia | 2
25 September – Maputo
Namibia | 0
Mozambique | 3

Final
27 September – Maputo
South Africa | 2
Mozambique | 1
Third place play-off
27 September – Maputo
Zambia | 3
Namibia | 0

==== Semi-finals ====
Winners qualified for 2027 U-20 Africa Cup of Nations.

25 September 2026
12:00

| South Africa | 4–2 | Zambia |
|---|---|---|
| Mendes 63' (pen.), 85' (pen.); Booysen 65'; Witbooi 90+6' | Report | Musialela 29'; Kalamina 75' (red card) 83' |

ABB Stadium (Pitch 1), Maputo

25 September 2026
18:00

| Namibia | 0–3 | Mozambique |
|---|---|---|
| | Report | Começar 15'; Pelembe 57'; Sócrates 79' |

ABB Stadium (Pitch 1), Maputo
Referee: Eugine Mdluli (South Africa)

==== Third place ====
27 September 2026
11:00

| Zambia | 3–0 | Namibia |
|---|---|---|
| Mumbi 42'; Muntanga 62', 90+1' | Report |

ABB Stadium (Pitch 1), Maputo
Referee: Eugine Mdluli (South Africa)

==== Final ====
27 September 2026
14:00

| South Africa | 2–1 | Mozambique |
|---|---|---|
| Booysen 28'; Mendes 58' (pen.) | Report | Começar 30'; Macombe (red card) 90+2' |

ABB Stadium (Pitch 1), Maputo
Referee: Mweshitsama Negongo (Namibia)

== See also ==
- 2027 U-17 Africa Cup of Nations qualification
