= Mohamed Camara =

Mohamed Camara may refer to:

- Mady Camara (born 1997), Guinean football midfielder who plays in Greece
- Mo Camara (born 1975), Guinean football defender who played in France, England, and Scotland
- Mohamed Ali Camara (born 1997), Guinean football defender who plays in Switzerland
- Mohamed Almamy Camara (born 1996), Guinean football forward who plays in Austria
- Mohamed Camara (film director) (born 1959), Guinean film director based in France
- Mohamed Camara (footballer, born 1980), Guinean football midfielder who played in Belgium and Greece
- Mohamed Camara (footballer, born 1981), Sierra Leonean football midfielder who played in Russia
- Mohamed Camara (footballer, born 1982), Guinean football midfielder who played in Guinea, Algeria, and Moldova
- Mohamed Camara (footballer, born 1987), Malian football defender who plays in Mali
- Mohamed Camara (footballer, born 1989), Guinean football midfielder who played in Guinea and Morocco
- Mohamed Camara (footballer, born 1990), Guinean football forward who plays in France
- Mohamed Camara (footballer, born 1999), Guinean football defender who plays in Guinea
- Mohamed Camara (footballer, born January 2000), Malian football midfielder who plays in Monaco
- Mohamed Camara (footballer, born March 2000), Guinean football goalkeeper who plays in Guinea
- Mohamed Lamine Camara (born 1986), Guinean football forward who played in Guinea and France
- Mohamed Marko Camara (born 1985), Guinean football forward who played in Guinea, Tunisia, and Algeria
- Mohamed Saliou Camara (born 1996), Guinean football midfielder who plays in Guinea
- Mohamed Sorel Camara (born 1997), Guinean football midfielder who plays in France
- Mohamed Tawal Camara (born 1976), Guinean football defender who played in Hungary
- Yali-Yali (Mohamed Camara, born 1985), Guinean footballer who played in Belgium

== See also ==
- Mohamed Kamara (disambiguation)
