= 2027 U-17 Africa Cup of Nations =

17th edition of U-17 AFCON

كأس الأمم الأفريقية تحت 17 سنة 2027; Coupe d'Afrique des nations de football des moins de 17 ans 2027

Tournament details
- Host country: Morocco
- Dates: 17 April – 7 May
- Teams: 16 (from 1 confederation)
- Venues: 4 (in 4 host cities)

The 2027 U-17 Africa Cup of Nations, known as the TotalEnergies U-17 Africa Cup of Nations for sponsorship purposes or 2027 U17 AFCON for short, is the 17th edition (22nd if editions without hosts are included) of the biennial African youth football tournament organized by Confederation of African Football (CAF) for players aged 17 and below.

Morocco was chosen as the host of this edition on 10 August 2026. The top 10 teams qualified for the 2027 FIFA U-17 World Cup in Qatar as the CAF representatives.

Senegal are the defending champions.

== Qualification ==
=== Player eligibility ===
Players born on 1 January 2010 or later were eligible to participate in this tournament edition.

=== Qualified teams ===
The following teams qualified for the tournament.

Team	Zone	Date of qualification	Appearance	Last appearance	Previous best performance
Morocco (hosts)	North Zone	10 August 2026	6th	2026	Champions (2025)
Egypt	North Zone	16 November 2026	6th	2026	Champions (1997)
Algeria	North Zone	16 November 2026	4th	2026	Runners-up (2009)
Gambia	West A Zone	17 September 2026	6th	2025	Champions (2005, 2009)
Senegal	West A Zone	17 September 2026	6th	2026	Champions (2023, 2026)
Guinea	West A Zone	20 September 2026	8th	2019	Runners-up (2019) (Note: Later null and voided.)
Ivory Coast	West B Zone	20 October 2026	8th	2026	Champions (2013)
Niger	West B Zone	20 October 2026	3rd	2017	Fourth place (2017)
	Central Zone				
Uganda	Central-East Zone	17 October 2026	4th	2026	Group stage (2019, 2025, 2026)
Somalia	Central-East Zone	17 October 2026	3th	2025	Group stage (2023, 2025)
Rwanda	Central-East Zone	19 October 2026	2nd	2011	Runners-up (2011)
	South Zone				

== Group stage ==
=== Tiebreakers ===
Teams were ranked according to the three points for a win system (3 points for a win, 1 for a draw, 0 points for a loss), and if tied on points, the following tiebreaking criteria were applied, in the order given, to determine the rankings:

1. Points in head-to-head matches among tied teams;
2. Goal difference in head-to-head matches among tied teams;
3. Goals scored in head-to-head matches among tied teams;
4. If more than two teams were tied, and after applying all head-to-head criteria above, if two teams are still tied, all head-to-head criteria above are applied exclusively to these two teams;
5. Goal difference in all group matches;
6. Goals scored in all group matches;
7. Drawing of lots.

=== Group A ===
Pos	Team	Pld	W	D	L	GF	GA	GD	Pts	Qualification
1	Morocco (H)	0	0	0	0	0	0	0	0	Knockout stage and 2027 FIFA U-17 World Cup
2	A2	0	0	0	0	0	0	0	0	Knockout stage and 2027 FIFA U-17 World Cup
3	A3	0	0	0	0	0	0	0	0	FIFA U-17 World Cup play-off
4	A4	0	0	0	0	0	0	0	0	

First match(es) will be played: Summer 2026. Source: UEFA
Rules for classification: Group stage tiebreakers
(H) Hosts

=== Group B ===
Pos	Team	Pld	W	D	L	GF	GA	GD	Pts	Qualification
1	B1	0	0	0	0	0	0	0	0	Knockout stage and 2027 FIFA U-17 World Cup
2	B2	0	0	0	0	0	0	0	0	Knockout stage and 2027 FIFA U-17 World Cup
3	B3	0	0	0	0	0	0	0	0	FIFA U-17 World Cup play-off
4	B4	0	0	0	0	0	0	0	0	

First match(es) will be played: Summer 2026. Source: UEFA
Rules for classification: Group stage tiebreakers

=== Group C ===
Pos	Team	Pld	W	D	L	GF	GA	GD	Pts	Qualification
1	C1	0	0	0	0	0	0	0	0	Knockout stage and 2027 FIFA U-17 World Cup
2	C2	0	0	0	0	0	0	0	0	Knockout stage and 2027 FIFA U-17 World Cup
3	C3	0	0	0	0	0	0	0	0	FIFA U-17 World Cup play-off
4	C4	0	0	0	0	0	0	0	0	

First match(es) will be played: Summer 2026. Source: UEFA
Rules for classification: Group stage tiebreakers

=== Group D ===
Pos	Team	Pld	W	D	L	GF	GA	GD	Pts	Qualification
1	D1	0	0	0	0	0	0	0	0	Knockout stage and 2027 FIFA U-17 World Cup
2	D2	0	0	0	0	0	0	0	0	Knockout stage and 2027 FIFA U-17 World Cup
3	D3	0	0	0	0	0	0	0	0	FIFA U-17 World Cup play-off
4	D4	0	0	0	0	0	0	0	0	

First match(es) will be played: Summer 2026. Source: UEFA
Rules for classification: Group stage tiebreakers

== Knockout stage ==
In the knockout stage, penalty shoot-outs are used to decide the winner if necessary (Regulations Article 75).

=== Bracket ===
Quarter-finals
May – TBC
Group A Winners
Group B Runners-up
May – TBC
Group C Winners
Group D Runners-up
May – TBC
Group B Winners
Group A Runners-up
May – TBC
Group D Winners
Group C Runners-up

Semi-finals
May – TBC
Quarter-final 1 Winners
Quarter-final 2 Winners
May – TBC
Quarter-final 3 Winners
Quarter-final 4 Winners

Final
May – TBC
Semi-final 1 Winners
Semi-final 2 Winners
Third place
18 May – TBC
Semi-final 1 Losers
Semi-final 2 Losers

=== Quarter-finals ===
May 2027

A1	QF1	B2

May 2027

B1	QF2	A2

May 2027

C1	QF3	D2

May 2027

D1	QF4	C2

=== Semi-finals ===
May 2027

QF1	SF1	QF4

May 2027

QF3	SF2	QF2

=== Third place match ===
May 2027

LSF1	3rd Place	LSF2

=== Final ===
May 2027

SF1	Final	SF2

=== Tournament rankings ===
Ranking criteria
For teams eliminated in the same knockout round, the following criteria are applied, in the order given, to determine the final rankings:
1. Goal difference in round eliminated;
2. Goals scored in round eliminated;
3. If teams eliminated in the semi-finals or quarter-finals are tied, the above criteria are reapplied for the previous knockout round, with this process repeated once more should two semi-finalists remain tied;
4. Points in group stage;
5. Goal difference in group stage;
6. Goals scored in group stage;
7. Disciplinary points.

For teams eliminated in the group stage, the following criteria are applied, in the order given, to determine the final rankings

1. Position in group;
2. Points;
3. Goal difference;
4. Goals scored;
5. Disciplinary points.

Pos.	Team	Pld	W	D	L	Pts	GF	GA	GD
1									
2									
3									
4									
Eliminated in the quarter-finals
5									
6									
7									
8									
Eliminated in the group stage
9									
10									
11									
12									

== See also ==
- 2027 U-20 Africa Cup of Nations
