= 2011 African U-17 Championship =

Coupe d'Afrique des nations des moins de 17 ans 2011 Igikombe cya Afurika cy’abatarengeje imyaka 17 2011 Kombe la Mataifa ya Afrika kwa chini ya miaka 17 2011

Tournament details
- Host country: Rwanda
- City: Kigali
- Dates: 8–22 January
- Teams: 8 (from CAF confederations)
- Venue(s): 3 (in 2 host cities)

Final positions
- Champions: Burkina Faso (1st title)
- Runners-up: Rwanda
- Third place: Congo
- Fourth place: Ivory Coast

Tournament statistics
- Matches played: 16
- Goals scored: 45 (2.81 per match)

The 2011 African U-17 Championship was a football competition organized by the Confederation of African Football (CAF). The tournament took place in Rwanda. The top four teams qualified for the 2011 FIFA U-17 World Cup.

== Qualification ==
=== Qualified teams ===
- Burkina Faso
- Congo
- Ivory Coast
- Egypt
- Gambia
- Mali
- Rwanda (Host nation)
- Senegal

== Venues ==
Kigali	Kigali	Gisenyi
Stade Amahoro	Stade Régional Nyamirambo	Umuganda Stadium
Capacity: 35,000	Capacity: 22,000	Capacity: 5,000

== Group stage ==
=== Group A ===
Pos	Team	Pld	W	D	L	GF	GA	GD	Pts	Qualification
1	Burkina Faso	3	2	0	1	8	4	+4	6	Knockout stage
2	Rwanda (H)	3	2	0	1	3	2	+1	6	Knockout stage
3	Senegal	3	1	0	2	4	5	−1	3	
4	Egypt	3	1	0	2	2	6	−4	3	

Rules for classification: Group stage tiebreakers
(H) Hosts
8 January 2011
15:30

Rwanda	2 – 1	Burkina Faso
Usengimana 3'; Tibingana 46'	Report	Ouedraogo 55'

Stade Amahoro, Kigali
Referee: (Angola) Helder Martins De Carvalho

8 January 2011
17:30

Senegal	1 – 2	Egypt
Ndiaye 21'	Report	Abdelmonem 66'; Rashad 83'

Stade Amahoro, Kigali
Referee: (Ivory Coast) Normandiez Desire Doue

11 January 2011
13:00

Burkina Faso	3 – 2	Senegal
Sana 26', 29'; Zerbo 27'	Report	Nassalan 50'; Drame 53'

Stade Régional Nyamirambo, Kigali
Referee: (Tunisia) Kacem Bennaceur

11 January 2011
15:30

Egypt	0 – 1	Rwanda
	Report	Usengimana 9'

Stade Régional Nyamirambo, Kigali
Referee: (Niger) Solomon Wokoma

14 January 2011
15:30

Rwanda	0 – 1	Senegal
	Report	Touré 85'

Stade Amahoro, Kigali
Referee: (Morocco) Bouchaïb El Ahrach

14 January 2011
15:30

Burkina Faso	4 – 0	Egypt
Traoré 39', 74'; Sana 50'; Ouedraogo 65'	Report

Stade Régional Nyamirambo, Kigali
Referee: (Zambia) Wellington Kaoma

=== Group B ===
Pos	Team	Pld	W	D	L	GF	GA	GD	Pts	Qualification
1	Ivory Coast	3	2	1	0	8	4	+4	7	Knockout stage
2	Congo	3	2	1	0	7	3	+4	7	Knockout stage
3	Gambia	3	1	0	2	2	7	−5	3	
4	Mali	3	0	0	3	2	5	−3	0	

Rules for classification: Group stage tiebreakers
9 January 2011
13:00

Gambia	0 – 3	Congo
	Report	Binguila 7', 50'; Epako 10'

Umuganda Stadium, Gisenyi
Referee: (Rwanda) Hundu Munyemana

9 January 2011
15:30

Ivory Coast	2 – 1	Mali
Diarrassouba 46'; Bedi 69'	Report	Keita 24'

Umuganda Stadium, Gisenyi
Referee: (Morocco) Bouchaïb El Ahrach

12 January 2011
13:00

Congo	2 – 2	Ivory Coast
Sitou 27'; Epako 54'	Report	Bedi 57', 89'

Umuganda Stadium, Gisenyi
Referee: (Zambia) Wellington Kaoma

12 January 2011
15:30

Mali	0 – 1	Gambia
	Report	Sarr 35'

Umuganda Stadium, Gisenyi
Referee: (Cameroon) Néant Alioum

15 January 2011
15:30

Gambia	1 – 4	Ivory Coast
Sarr 70'	Report	Diarrassouba 12'; Kouassi 44'; Lago 61'; Bedi 74'

Stade Régional Nyamirambo, Kigali
Referee: (Angola) Helder Martins De Carvalho

15 January 2011
15:30

Congo	2 – 1	Mali
Nkounkou 50'; Epako 56'	Report	Berthé 87'

Umuganda Stadium, Gisenyi
Referee: (Tunisia) Kacem Bennaceur

== Knock-out stage ==
Semi-finals
18 January – Kigali (Stade Amahoro)
Burkina Faso (pen.)	1 (4)
Congo	1 (2)
19 January – Kigali (Stade Amahoro)
Ivory Coast	0
Rwanda	1

Final
22 January – Kigali (Stade Amahoro)
Burkina Faso	2
Rwanda	1
Third place
21 January – Kigali (Stade Régional Nyamirambo)
Congo	2
Ivory Coast	1

=== Semifinals ===
18 January 2011
15:30

Burkina Faso	1 – 1 (a.e.t.)	Congo
Traoré 53'	Report	Epako 33'
Penalties
	4–2

Stade Amahoro, Kigali
Referee: (Morocco) Bouchaïb El Ahrach
19 January 2011
15:30

Ivory Coast	0 – 1	Rwanda
	Report	Mico 72'

Stade Amahoro, Kigali

=== Third place match ===
21 January 2011
15:30

Congo	2 – 1	Ivory Coast
Lekandza 6'; Binguila 45+1'	Report	Kouakou 85'

Stade Régional Nyamirambo, Kigali
Referee: (Zambia) Wellington Kaoma

=== Final ===
22 January 2011
15:30

Burkina Faso	2 – 1	Rwanda
Sana 59'; Kaboré 72'	Report	Tibingana 67'

Stade Amahoro, Kigali
Referee: (Angola) Helder Martins De Carvalho

== Winners ==
2011 CAF Under-17 Championship
(Burkina Faso)
Burkina Faso
First title

== Goalscorers ==
4 goals

- (Burkina Faso) Zaniou Sana
- (Republic of the Congo) Stévy Epako
- (Ivory Coast) Guy Bedi

3 goals

- (Burkina Faso) Bertrand Traoré
- (Republic of the Congo) Hardy Binguila

2 goals

- (Burkina Faso) Fayçal Ouedraogo
- (Ivory Coast) Drissa Diarrassouba
- (The Gambia) Yusupha Dawda Sarr
- (Rwanda) Charles Tibingana
- (Rwanda) Faustin Usengimana

1 goal

- (Burkina Faso) Abdoul Aziz Kaboré
- (Burkina Faso) Ben Issa Zerbo
- (Republic of the Congo) Ange Sitou
- (Republic of the Congo) Christ Nkounkou
- (Republic of the Congo) Melvan Lekandza
- (Ivory Coast) Andres Koussounou Kouakou
- (Ivory Coast) Jean Evrard Kouassi
- (Ivory Coast) Lionel Ange Lago
- (Egypt) Mahmoud Abdelmonem
- (Egypt) Mohamed Rashad
- (Mali) Malick Berthé
- (Mali) Tiécoro Keita
- (Rwanda) Justin Mico
- (Senegal) Ibrahima Drame
- (Senegal) Rémy Nassalan
- (Senegal) Ibrahima Ndiaye
- (Senegal) Mamadou Saliou Touré
