= Richard Tardy =

French football player and manager (born 1950)

Personal information
- Full name: Richard Francis Emile Tardy
- Date of birth: 29 August 1950 (age 76)
- Place of birth: Saint-Chamas, France
- Position: Forward

Senior career*
Years	Team	Apps	(Gls)
1968–1973	SSMC Miramas		
1973–1975	Aix-en-Provence		
1975–1982	SSMC Miramas		
1982–1983	Aix-en-Provence		

Managerial career
- 1980–1981: SSMC Miramas
- 2000–2001: Aris
- 2002–2003: Lebanon
- 2004: Africa Sports
- 2005: MC Alger (assistant)
- 2006: Al Wahda
- 2006–2007: Olympic de Safi
- 2007–2008: Al-Wakrah
- 2008–2009: Olympique de Khouribga
- 2010: Saint-Étienne
- 2010–2013: Rwanda U17
- 2014–2015: Ansar
- 2016: Young Lions
- 2017: Young Lions
- 2018: Tours (assistant)
- * Club domestic league appearances and goals

Richard Francis Emile Tardy (born 29 July 1950) is a French former professional football player and manager. He led several clubs and national teams as a coach.

== Managerial career ==
Tardy has managed in the Super League Greece with Aris and led the Lebanon national football team before managing Africa Sports in Côte d'Ivoire. He managed OC Khouribga during the 2008–09 GNF 1 season.

Tardy coached the Rwanda national under-17 football team to a second-place finish at the 2011 African U-17 Championship, before leading the team at the 2011 FIFA U-17 World Cup in Mexico.
