= Mohamed Kamara =

Mohamed Kamara may refer to:

- Mohamed Lamin Kamara (born 1943), Sierra Leonean politician
- Mohamed Kamara (footballer, born 1981), Sierra Leonean football midfielder who played in Russia
- Medo Kamara (Mohamed Kamara, born 1987), Sierra Leonean football midfielder
- Mohamed Kamara (weightlifter) (born 1987), Sierra Leonean weightlifter
- Mohamed Kamara (footballer, born 1999), Sierra Leonean football goalkeeper
- Mohamed Kamara (American football) (born 1999), American gridiron football player

== See also ==
- Mohamed Camara (disambiguation)
- Mohammed Kamara (born 1997), Liberian football forward
