= Mahmoud Salah =

Mahmoud Salah may refer to:

- Mahmoud Salah (activist) (1979–2002), Palestinian member of al-Aqsa Martyrs' Brigades
- Mahmoud Salah (footballer, born 1994), Egyptian professional footballer
- Mahmoud Salah (footballer, born 2007), Egyptian professional footballer
- Mahmoud Salah Eldin Hamed (born 1927), Egyptian economist
