= Alfred Mugabo =

Rwandan footballer

Personal information
- Full name: Alfred Martin Mugabo
- Date of birth: 9 October 1995 (age 31)
- Place of birth: Kanumbo, Kicukiro District, Rwanda
- Position: Midfielder

Youth career
- 2007–2014: Arsenal

Senior career*
Years	Team	Apps	(Gls)
2015–2016	Bedford	5	(0)
2016	Enfield Town	8	(0)
2016–2017	Dulwich Hamlet	0	(0)
2016–2017	→ Canvey Island (loan)	9	(0)
2017	Canvey Island	1	(0)
2017	Metropolitan Police	2	(0)
2017	Braintree Town	8	(0)

International career^{‡}
2011	Rwanda U17	2	(0)
2013	Rwanda	1	(0)
- * Club domestic league appearances and goals as of 7 October 2017 (UTC) ‡ National team caps and goals as of 04:19, 1 March 2017 (UTC)

Alfred Martin Mugabo (born 9 October 1995) is a Rwandan footballer who last played as a midfielder for Braintree Town.

== Career ==
Born in Rwanda, Mugabo joined the Arsenal F.C. Academy at the U13s. After being released by the club in March 2014, Mugabo was reported to be on trial with Sheffield Wednesday. He signed for Enfield Town in March 2016 after playing earlier in the season for Bedford.

On 1 June 2016, it was announced that Mugabo had agreed to join Dulwich Hamlet of the Isthmian League Premier Division for the 2016–17 season.

After missing the first months of the 2016–17 season through an injury which prevented him from making his debut for the Hamlet, Mugabo joined Canvey Island on loan towards the end of November 2016.

On 31 January 2017, it was announced that Mugabo had mutually agreed to terminate his contract with Dulwich Hamlet, and the switch to Canvey Island was made permanent. He made only one further appearance before joining Metropolitan Police.

Following a spell with Metropolitan Police, Mugabo joined National League South side Braintree Town prior to the 2017–18 campaign. However, after just three months he left the club after incurring yet another injury. He is undergoing an operation and looks to make a return the following season.

== International ==
Mugabo first joined the Rwandan football set-up at the U17 level when he played for the team at the 2011 FIFA U-17 World Cup. Mugabo made his debut at the U17 World Cup on 22 June 2011 against the Uruguay U17s in which he came on in the 74th minute as Rwanda lost 1–0.

Mugabo then made his debut for the senior side on 16 June 2013 during 2014 FIFA World Cup qualification against Algeria in which he came on in the 54th minute for Tumaine Ntamuhanga as Rwanda went on to lose the match 1–0.
