= 2027 U-20 Africa Cup of Nations =

26th edition of U-20 AFCON

2027 CAF U-20 Africa Cup of Nations
Tournament details
- Host country: Ghana
- Dates: 14 March – 3 April
- Teams: 12 (from 1 confederation)

The 2027 U-20 Africa Cup of Nations, known as the 2027 U20 AFCON or 2027 AFCON U20 for short and as the 2027 TotalEnergies U-20 Africa Cup of Nations for sponsorship purposes, is the 19th edition (26th if editions of the tournament without hosts are included) of the biennial African international youth football tournament organized by the Confederation of African Football.

The four semi-finalists also will qualify as the CAF representatives for the 2027 FIFA U-20 World Cup in Azerbaijan and Uzbekistan.

South Africa are the defending champions.

== Qualification ==
=== Player eligibility ===
Players born 1 January 2007 or later are eligible to participate in the competition.

=== Qualified teams ===
The following 12 teams qualified for the group stages:

| Team | Zone | Date of qualification | Appearance | Last appearance | Previous best performance |
|---|---|---|---|---|---|
| Morocco | North Zone | 3 October 2026 | 7th | 2025 | Champions (1997) |
| Egypt | North Zone | 6 October 2026 | 14th | 2025 | Champions (1991, 2003, 2013) |
| Gambia | West A Zone | 25 October 2026 | 5th | 2023 | Runners-up (2023) |
| Guinea | West A Zone | 25 October 2026 | 4th | 2017 | Third place (2017) |
| Ghana | West B Zone | 10 August 2026 | 14th | 2025 | Champions (1993, 1999, 2009, 2021) |
| Burkina Faso | West B Zone | 5 August 2026 | 5th | 2021 | Fourth place (2003) |
| Cameroon | Central Zone | 21 October 2026 | 11th | 2021 | Champions (1995) |
| Central African Republic | Central Zone | 21 October 2026 | 4th | 2025 | Quarterfinals (2021) |
| Sudan | Central-East Zone | 22 September 2026 | 3rd | 2017 | Group stage (1997, 2017) |
| Tanzania | Central-East Zone | 22 September 2026 | 3rd | 2025 | Group stage (2021, 2025) |
| South Africa | South Zone | 27 September 2026 | 10th | 2025 | Champions (2025) |
| Mozambique | South Zone | 27 September 2026 | 3th | 2023 | Group stage (2021, 2023) |

== Group stage ==
=== Tiebreakers ===
Teams will be ranked according to the three points for a win system (3 points for a win, 1 for a draw, 0 points for a loss), and if tied on points, the following tiebreaking criteria are applied, in the order given, to determine the rankings:

1. Points in head-to-head matches among tied teams;
2. Goal difference in head-to-head matches among tied teams;
3. Goals scored in head-to-head matches among tied teams;
4. If more than two teams were tied, and after applying all head-to-head criteria above, if two teams are still tied, all head-to-head criteria above are applied exclusively to these two teams;
5. Goal difference in all group matches;
6. Goals scored in all group matches;
7. Drawing of lots.

=== Group A ===
| Pos | Team | Pld | W | D | L | GF | GA | GD | Pts | Qualification |
|---|---|---|---|---|---|---|---|---|---|---|
| 1 | Ghana (H) | 0 | 0 | 0 | 0 | 0 | 0 | 0 | 0 | Qualification to #Knockout stage |
| 2 | A2 | 0 | 0 | 0 | 0 | 0 | 0 | 0 | 0 | Qualification to #Knockout stage |
| 3 | A3 | 0 | 0 | 0 | 0 | 0 | 0 | 0 | 0 | Possible knockout stage |
| 4 | A4 | 0 | 0 | 0 | 0 | 0 | 0 | 0 | 0 | |

First match(es) will be played: May 2027. Source: CAF
Rules for classification: Tiebreakers
(H) Hosts

=== Group B ===
| Pos | Team | Pld | W | D | L | GF | GA | GD | Pts | Qualification |
|---|---|---|---|---|---|---|---|---|---|---|
| 1 | B1 | 0 | 0 | 0 | 0 | 0 | 0 | 0 | 0 | Qualification to #Knockout stage |
| 2 | B2 | 0 | 0 | 0 | 0 | 0 | 0 | 0 | 0 | Qualification to #Knockout stage |
| 3 | B3 | 0 | 0 | 0 | 0 | 0 | 0 | 0 | 0 | Possible knockout stage |
| 4 | B4 | 0 | 0 | 0 | 0 | 0 | 0 | 0 | 0 | |

First match(es) will be played: May 2027. Source: CAF
Rules for classification: Tiebreakers

=== Group C ===
| Pos | Team | Pld | W | D | L | GF | GA | GD | Pts | Qualification |
|---|---|---|---|---|---|---|---|---|---|---|
| 1 | C1 | 0 | 0 | 0 | 0 | 0 | 0 | 0 | 0 | Qualification to #Knockout stage |
| 2 | C2 | 0 | 0 | 0 | 0 | 0 | 0 | 0 | 0 | Qualification to #Knockout stage |
| 3 | C3 | 0 | 0 | 0 | 0 | 0 | 0 | 0 | 0 | Possible knockout stage |
| 4 | C4 | 0 | 0 | 0 | 0 | 0 | 0 | 0 | 0 | |

First match(es) will be played: May 2027. Source: CAF
Rules for classification: Tiebreakers

=== Ranking of third-placed teams ===
| Pos | Grp | Team | Pld | W | D | L | GF | GA | GD | Pts | Qualification |
|---|---|---|---|---|---|---|---|---|---|---|---|
| 1 | A | Third place Group A | 0 | 0 | 0 | 0 | 0 | 0 | 0 | 0 | Knockout stage |
| 2 | B | Third place Group B | 0 | 0 | 0 | 0 | 0 | 0 | 0 | 0 | Knockout stage |
| 3 | C | Third place Group C | 0 | 0 | 0 | 0 | 0 | 0 | 0 | 0 | |

First match(es) will be played: May 2027. Source:

== Knockout stage ==
In the knockout stage, penalty shoot-outs are used to decide the winner if necessary (Regulations Article 75).

=== Bracket ===
Quarter-finals
May – TBC
Group A Winners
3rd placed team B/C
May – TBC
Group C Winners
3rd placed team A/B
May – TBC
Group B Winners
Group A Runners-up
May – TBC
Group B Runners-up
Group C Runners-up

Semi-finals
May – TBC
Quarter-final 1 Winners
Quarter-final 2 Winners
May – TBC
Quarter-final 3 Winners
Quarter-final 4 Winners

Final
May – TBC
Semi-final 1 Winners
Semi-final 2 Winners
Third place
18 May – TBC
Semi-final 1 Losers
Semi-final 2 Losers

=== Quarter-finals ===
May 2027

| A1 | QF1 | B2 |

May 2027

| B1 | QF2 | A2 |

May 2027

| C1 | QF3 | D2 |

May 2027

| D1 | QF4 | C2 |

=== Semi-finals ===
May 2027

| QF1 | SF1 | QF4 |

May 2027

| QF3 | SF2 | QF2 |

=== Third place match ===
May 2027

| LSF1 | 3rd Place | LSF2 |

=== Final ===
May 2027

| SF1 | Final | SF2 |

=== Tournament rankings ===
Ranking criteria
For teams eliminated in the same knockout round, the following criteria are applied, in the order given, to determine the final rankings:
1. Goal difference in round eliminated;
2. Goals scored in round eliminated;
3. If teams eliminated in the semi-finals or quarter-finals are tied, the above criteria are reapplied for the previous knockout round, with this process repeated once more should two semi-finalists remain tied;
4. Points in group stage;
5. Goal difference in group stage;
6. Goals scored in group stage;
7. Disciplinary points.

For teams eliminated in the group stage, the following criteria are applied, in the order given, to determine the final rankings

1. Position in group;
2. Points;
3. Goal difference;
4. Goals scored;
5. Disciplinary points.

| Pos. | Team | Pld | W | D | L | Pts | GF | GA | GD |
|---|---|---|---|---|---|---|---|---|---|
| 1 | | | | | | | | | |
| 2 | | | | | | | | | |
| 3 | | | | | | | | | |
| 4 | | | | | | | | | |
Eliminated in the quarter-finals
| 5 | | | | | | | | | |
| 6 | | | | | | | | | |
| 7 | | | | | | | | | |
| 8 | | | | | | | | | |
Eliminated in the group stage
| 9 | | | | | | | | | |
| 10 | | | | | | | | | |
| 11 | | | | | | | | | |
| 12 | | | | | | | | | |

== See also ==
- 2027 U-17 Africa Cup of Nations
