= 2024 CECAFA U-20 Championship =

Tournament details
- Host country: Tanzania
- Dates: 6 –20 October
- Teams: 9
- Venues: 3 (in 1 host city)

Final positions
- Champions: Tanzania (3rd title)
- Runners-up: Kenya
- Third place: Uganda
- Fourth place: Burundi

Tournament statistics
- Matches played: 20
- Goals scored: 68 (3.4 per match)
- Attendance: 20,000 (1,000 per match)

The 2024 CECAFA U-20 Championship was the 15th edition of the CECAFA U-20 Championship, an international youth football tournament open to national associations of the CECAFA region. It took place between 6 and 20 October 2024 in Tanzania. This competition served as the CECAFA qualifiers for the 2025 U-20 Africa Cup of Nations.

Uganda won previous edition title in 2022.

Tanzania defeated Kenya 2–1 in the final. Both finalists qualified for the 2025 U-20 Africa Cup of Nations.

== Teams ==
- Burundi
- Djibouti
- Ethiopia
- Kenya
- Rwanda
- South Sudan
- Sudan
- Tanzania
- Uganda

Did not enter

- Eritrea
- Somalia

== Draw ==
The draw was held on 12 September 2024 at 12:00 EAT (UTC+3) at Dar es Salaam.The 9 teams were drawn into two groups of four and five teams, with hosts Tanzania seeded in Group A (position A1), and the defending champions Uganda seeded in Group B (position B1). The remaining 7 teams were allocated to two pots based on the results of the previous tournament edition and were drawn to the remaining positions.

Seeded	Pot 1	Pot 2
Tanzania (hosts); Uganda	South Sudan; Sudan	Burundi; Djibouti; Ethiopia; Kenya; Rwanda

== Group stage ==
All times are local, EAT (UTC+3).

The nine teams were drawn into two groups of four and five teams. The winners and the runners-up of each group advanced to the semi-finals.

=== Group A ===
Pos	Team	Pld	W	D	L	GF	GA	GD	Pts	Qualification
1	Kenya	4	3	1	0	10	1	+9	10	Semi-finals
2	Tanzania (H)	4	3	0	1	12	2	+10	9	Semi-finals
3	Sudan	4	2	0	2	4	6	−2	6	
4	Rwanda	4	1	1	2	5	5	0	4	
5	Djibouti	4	0	0	4	2	19	−17	0	

Source: CECAFA
(H) Hosts
6 October 2024
16:00

Tanzania	1–2	Kenya
Mkinyange 77'		Wanganya 26'; Omondi 67'

6 October 2024
18:00

Sudan	3–1	Djibouti
Khmies 3'; Musa 62'; Shamselden 73'		Daher 54'

8 October 2024
16:00

Tanzania	7–0	Djibouti
Mashaka 21', 76', 90+6' (pen.); Kondo 58', 90+1'; Jimmy 62'; Mosha 70'

8 October 2024
18:00

Sudan	1–0	Rwanda
Khmies 6'

10 October 2024
16:00

Rwanda	0–0	Kenya

10 October 2024
17:00

Tanzania	1–0	Sudan
Khamis 76'

13 October 2024
16:00

Djibouti	0–4	Kenya
		Kitsao 6'; Wangaya 10', 26'; Okoth 49'

13 October 2024
19:00

Tanzania	3–0	Rwanda
Sereri 3'; Kondo 71', 83'

15 October 2024
14:00

Rwanda	5–1	Djibouti
Sindi 9'; Ndayishimiye 23'; Iradukunda 44'; Petry 52' (pen.); Yangiriyeneza 74'		Ahmed Dini Hassan 90+4' (pen.)

15 October 2024
14:00

Sudan	0–4	Kenya
		Kibet 3', 41', 90+2'; Wangaya 68'

=== Group B ===
Pos	Team	Pld	W	D	L	GF	GA	GD	Pts	Qualification
1	Uganda	3	2	1	0	9	3	+6	7	Semi-finals
2	Burundi	3	2	0	1	5	6	−1	6	Semi-finals
3	South Sudan	3	1	1	1	4	4	0	4	
4	Ethiopia	3	0	0	3	3	8	−5	0	

Source: CECAFA
7 October 2024
16:00

South Sudan	0–1	Burundi
		Ndayikengurukiye 8'

7 October 2024
18:00

Uganda	3–0	Ethiopia
Sekibengo 24'; Mpasa 40'; Babulo 90' (o.g.)

9 October 2024
16:00

Uganda	4–1	Burundi
Oyirwoth 2'; Dembe 18', 22'; Hakizimana 59' (o.g.)		Ndayikengurukiye 62'

9 October 2024
18:00

South Sudan	2–1	Ethiopia
Garang 14'; Bichiok 75'		Thurbiel 83'

11 October 2024
16:00

Burundi	3–2	Ethiopia
Ndayikengurukiye 7' (pen.), 34'; Mariniho 87'		Tefera 25'; Iwali 28'

11 October 2024
16:00

Uganda	2–2	South Sudan
Dembe 16', 21'		Swoka 31'; Oleo 90'

== Knockout stage ==
=== Bracket ===
Semi-finals
18 October
Uganda	1
Tanzania (a.e.t.)	2
18 October
Kenya	4
Burundi	0

Final
20 October
Tanzania	2
Kenya	1
Third place
20 October
Uganda	3
Burundi	1

=== Semi-finals ===
Winners qualified for 2025 U-20 Africa Cup of Nations.

18 October 2024
15:00

Uganda	1–2 (a.e.t.)	Tanzania
Majub 47'		Maguda 74' (o.g.); Simba 120'

18 October 2024
19:00

Kenya	4–0	Burundi
Okoth 52'; Beja 68'; Kibet 70'; Ingavi 90+5'

==== Third place ====
20 October 2024
12:00

Uganda	3–1	Burundi
Walusimbi 45+1'; Dembe 62', 78'		Hakizimana 6'

==== Final ====
20 October 2024
15:00

Tanzania	2–1	Kenya
Mashaka 63'; Khamis 79'		Beja 47'
