= Aldrine Kibet =

Kenyan footballer

Personal information
- Full name: Aldrine Kibet
- Date of birth: 13 June 2007 (age 19)
- Place of birth: Eldama Ravine, Baringo County, Kenya
- Height: 1.78 m (5 ft 10 in)
- Position: Attacking midfielder

Team information
- Current team: Celta B
- Number: 15

Youth career
- Nakuru Youth Sports Association
- 2020–2023: St. Anthony's Kitale
- 2023–2025: Nastic Sports Academy
- 2025–2026: Celta

Senior career*
Years	Team	Apps	(Gls)
2025–	Celta B	11	(0)

International career^{‡}
2023–	Kenya U18	6	(3)
2024–	Kenya U20	5	(4)
2025–	Kenya	1	(0)
- * Club domestic league appearances and goals as of 15 August 2026 ‡ National team caps and goals as of 18:14, 14 November 2025 (UTC)

Aldrine Kibet (born 13 June 2007) is a Kenyan footballer who plays as an attacking midfielder for Spanish club RC Celta Fortuna and the Kenya national team.

== Early life ==
Kibet attended Poror Primary School in Baringo and Mama Ngina Primary school in Nakuru and honed his football skills at Nakuru Youth Sports Association. He later joined St. Anthony's School and this is where his football prowess came to the fore which opened his doors to the Kenya U18 and U20 teams, and a place in Nastic Academy and all the way to Celta Fortuna.

== Club career ==
Kibet rose to prominence in August 2023 while representing St. Anthony's Boys Kitale at the 2023 Kenya Secondary Schools Sports Association (KSSSA) Games in Kakamega, where he played alongside box-to-box midfielder Alvin Kasavuli, now at Nastic Sports Academy in Barcelona, and Amos Wanjala, currently with Torrellano CF. His standout performances, including leading his team to the title, earned him the LG/SJAK Sports Personality of the Month award for August 2023. In 2023, he moved to Spain and joined Nastic Sports Academy. On 16 July 2025, RC Celta de Vigo announced the signing of Kibet on a four-year contract; initially registered in the Juvenil team, he was assigned to the B-team in the Primera Federación.

Kibet made his professional debut on 15 August 2026, starting in a 0–0 away draw against Cádiz CF.

== International career ==
Kibet was part of Kenya's U18 side that won silver at the CECAFA U-18 championship held in Kisumu, Kenya in November 2023. He scored a hat-trick after finding the net in three of four different group games against Sudan, Rwanda, and Somalia to emerge as the tournament's golden boot winner.

He was included in the Kenya U20 team that took part in the 2024 CECAFA U-20 Championship in October 2024, in Dar es Salaam, Tanzania. He scored three goals in Kenya's 4–0 win over Sudan at the Azam Complex.

Kibet was part of the Kenya U20 side that qualified for the 2025 U-20 Africa Cup of Nations tournament held in Cairo, Egypt, in May 2025
