= Ibrahima Ndiaye =

Ibrahima Ndiaye may refer to:

- Ibrahima N'Diaye (born 1948), Malian politician
- Ibrahima Ndiaye (footballer) (born 1998), Senegalese footballer
- Ibrahima Mame N'Diaye (born 1994), Senegalese footballer
