= Paul Massey =

Paul Massey may refer to:

- Paul Massey (rower) (1926–2009), British rower and Olympian
- Paul Massey (gangster) (1960–2015), English criminal and Salford-based businessman
- Paul Massey (sound engineer) (born 1958), English sound engineer

== See also ==
- Paul Massie (1932–2011), Canadian actor and academic
