= Mohamed Camara (footballer, born 1982) =

Guinean footballer

Personal information
- Date of birth: 24 August 1982 (age 44)
- Height: 1.77 m (5 ft 10 in)
- Position: Midfielder

Senior career*
Years	Team	Apps	(Gls)
- Kaloum Star
2005–2006	Biskra	24	(0)
2007–2008	Tiligul Tiraspol		
- * Club domestic league appearances and goals

Mohamed Camara (born 24 August 1982) is a Guinean former footballer. He spent one season with Algerian side Biskra before moving to Moldova to sign for Tiligul Tiraspol.

== Career statistics ==
=== Club ===
Appearances and goals by club, season and competition
Club	Season	League			Cup		Other		Total	
Club	Season	Division	Apps	Goals	Apps	Goals	Apps	Goals	Apps	Goals
Biskra	2005–06	Algerian Championnat National	24	0	0	0	0	0	24	0
Career total			24	0	0	0	0	0	24	0
