= Tiécoro Keita =

Malian footballer

Personal information
- Full name: Tiécoro Keita
- Date of birth: 13 April 1994 (age 32)
- Place of birth: Bamako, Mali
- Height: 1.80 m (5 ft 11 in)
- Position: Midfielder

Team information
- Current team: Vevey-Sports
- Number: 17

Senior career*
Years	Team	Apps	(Gls)
2012–2014	Guingamp B	24	(3)
2012–2014	Guingamp	0	(0)
2014	→ Vannes (loan)	12	(0)
2014–2016	Paris FC B	6	(3)
2014–2016	Paris FC	55	(5)
2016–2018	Red Star	25	(1)
2018–2019	Les Herbiers	16	(2)
2019	Les Herbiers B	4	(0)
2019–2023	Fréjus Saint-Raphaël	75	(1)
2023–2024	Thonon Evian	24	(0)
2024	Le Mans	7	(0)
2025–	Vevey-Sports	11	(0)

International career
2013	Mali U20	7	(1)
2016	Mali	1	(0)
- * Club domestic league appearances and goals as of 22 June 2025

Tiécoro Keita (born 13 April 1994) is a Malian professional footballer who plays as a midfielder for French Promotion League club Vevey-Sports. He is a former Mali international.

== Club career ==
Keita started his career at Guingamp in 2012, where he trained with the first team, but played for the reserves in Championnat de France Amateur 2. He was loaned to Vannes for six months at the start of 2014, and made his first team debut on 21 February 2014 against Fréjus Saint-Raphaël in the Championnat National.

In August 2014 he joined Paris FC, helping them to promotion from 2014–15 Championnat National to Ligue 2. He featured 30 times in Ligue 2, and when Paris FC were relegated at the end of the season, Keita stayed in Ligue 2, signing for Red Star.

== International career ==
Keita represented the Mali under-20 national team four times at the 2013 African U-20 Championship. He also played at the 2013 FIFA U-20 World Cup, appearing three times.

Keita made his debut for the senior Mali national team in a 1–0 friendly loss to Nigeria on 27 May 2016.

== Career statistics ==
=== Club ===
As of 18 August 2024

Appearances and goals by club, season and competition
Club	Season	League			Coupe de France		Coupe de la Ligue		Total	
Club	Season	Division	Apps	Goals	Apps	Goals	Apps	Goals	Apps	Goals
Guingamp B	2012-13	CFA2	12	2	—		—		12	2
Guingamp B	2013-14	CFA2	12	1	—		—		12	1
Guingamp B	Total		24	3	—		—		24	3
Guingamp	2013-14	Ligue 1	0	0	—		—		0	0
Vannes (loan)	2013-14	Championnat National	12	0	—		—		12	0
Paris FC B	2014-15	CFA2	3	1	—		—		3	1
Paris FC B	2015-16	CFA2	3	2	—		—		3	2
Paris FC B	Total		6	3	—		—		6	3
Paris FC	2014-15	Championnat National	25	3	1	0	—		26	3
Paris FC	2015-16	Ligue 2	30	2	1	0	1	0	32	2
Paris FC	Total		55	5	2	0	1	0	58	5
Red Star	2016-17	Ligue 2	15	0	1	0	1	0	17	0
Red Star	2017-18	Championnat National	10	0	—		2	0	12	0
Red Star	Total		25	0	1	0	3	0	29	0
Les Herbiers	2018-19	Championnat National 2	16	2	4	0	—		20	2
Les Herbiers B	2018-19	Championnat National 3	4	0	—		—		4	0
Fréjus	2019-20	Championnat National 2	17	0	3	0	—		20	0
Fréjus	2020-21	Championnat National 2	8	0	—		—		8	0
Fréjus	2021-22	Championnat National 2	26	1	—		—		26	1
Fréjus	2022-23	Championnat National 2	24	0	—		—		24	0
Fréjus	Total		75	1	3	0	—		78	1
Thonon Evian	2023-24	Championnat National 2	24	0	2	0	—		26	0
Le Mans	2024-25	Championnat National	1	0	—		—		1	0
Career Total			242	14	12	0	4	0	258	14
