= Rwanda national under-17 football team =

National association football team

Rwanda
- Nickname: Amavubi (The Wasps)
- Association: Fédération Rwandaise de Football Association (FERWAFA)
- Confederation: CAF (Africa)
- Sub-confederation: CECAFA (East & Central Africa)
- Head coach: Yves Rwasamani
- FIFA code: RWA
First colours	Second colours

U-17 Africa Cup of Nations
- Appearances: 1 (first in 2011)
- Best result: Runners-up (2011)

FIFA U-17 World Cup
- Appearances: 1 (first in 2011)
- Best result: Group Stage (2011)

The Rwanda national under-17 football team represents Rwanda in association football at the under-17 age level and is controlled by the Fédération Rwandaise de Football Association. The team competes in the U-17 Africa Cup of Nations and the FIFA U-17 World Cup, which are both held every two years.

Rwanda participated in the FIFA U-17 World Cup for the first time in 2011, having finished second in the 2011 African U-17 Championship, played in Rwanda. However, they were eliminated in the group stage after suffering defeats against England and Uruguay, and playing to a draw against Canada.

The team is currently coached by Richard Tardy of France, who previously managed Super League Greece club Aris and the Lebanon national football team.

== Competitive record ==
=== FIFA U-16 and U-17 World Cup record ===
FIFA U-16 and U-17 World Cup
Year	Round	GP	W	D^{1}	L	GS	GA
(China) 1985	Did not enter						
(Canada) 1987	Did not enter						
(Scotland) 1989	Did not enter						
(Italy) 1991	Did not enter						
(Japan) 1993	Did not enter						
(Ecuador) 1995	Did not enter						
(Egypt) 1997	Did not enter						
(New Zealand) 1999	Did not enter						
(Trinidad and Tobago) 2001	Did not qualify						
(Finland) 2003	Did not enter						
(Peru) 2005	Did not qualify						
(South Korea) 2007	Did not qualify						
(Nigeria) 2009	Did not qualify						
(Mexico) 2011	Group stage	3	0	1	2	0	3
(United Arab Emirates) 2013	Did not qualify						
(Chile) 2015	Did not qualify						
(India) 2017	Did not enter						
(Brazil) 2019	Did not qualify						
(Indonesia) 2023	Did not qualify						
(Qatar) 2025	Did not enter						
(Qatar) 2026	To be determined						
Total	0/20	0	0	0	0	0	0

=== U-17 Africa Cup of Nations record ===
U-17 Africa Cup of Nations
Year	Round	GP	W	D^{1}	L	GS	GA
(Mali) 1995	Did not enter						
(Botswana) 1997	Did not enter						
(Guinea) 1999	Did not enter						
(Seychelles) 2001	Did not qualify						
(Eswatini) 2003	Did not enter						
(The Gambia) 2005	Did not enter						
(Togo) 2007	Did not enter						
(Algeria) 2009	Did not enter						
(Rwanda) 2011	Runners-up	5	3	0	2	5	4
(Morocco) 2013	Did not qualify						
(Niger) 2015	Did not qualify						
(Gabon) 2017	Did not enter						
(Tanzania) 2019	Did not qualify						
(Algeria) 2023	Did not enter						
(Morocco) 2025	Did not enter						
Total	1/15	5	3	0	2	5	4

^{1}Draws include knockout matches decided on penalty kicks.

== Players ==
The following players were named in the squad for the 2011 FIFA U-17 World Cup. Clubs correct as of 18 June 2011.

#	Pos.	Player	Date of Birth (age)	Club
1	GK	Steven Ntalibi	22 December 1994 (aged 16)	SEC Rwanda
18	GK	Marcel Nzarora	22 November 1994 (aged 16)	SEC Rwanda
21	GK	Kabes Hategikimana	18 April 1994 (aged 17)	Unknown
2	DF	Michel Rusheshangoga	25 August 1994 (aged 16)	(Rwanda) Isonga
3	DF	Mancuri omar	11 October 1995 (aged 15)	(Rwanda) Musanze
4	DF	Eugene Habyarimana	29 October 1994 (aged 16)	SEC Rwanda
8	DF	Emery Bayisenge (c)	2 November 1994 (aged 16)	(Rwanda) Isonga
15	DF	Faustin Usengimana	11 June 1994 (aged 17)	(Rwanda) Rayon Sports
16	DF	Jean-Marie Rusingizandekwe	1 July 1994 (aged 16)	(Belgium) KV Mechelen
6	MF	Robert Ndatimana	11 September 1995 (aged 15)	(Rwanda) Isonga
7	MF	Charles Tibingana	22 December 1994 (aged 16)	(Uganda) Proline
10	MF	Andrew Buteera	3 October 1994 (aged 16)	(Uganda) Proline
11	MF	Alfred Mugabo	9 October 1995 (aged 15)	(England) Arsenal
13	MF	Heritier Turatsinze	30 October 1994 (aged 16)	SEC Rwanda
14	MF	Janvier Benedata	12 August 1995 (aged 15)	(Rwanda) A.P.R.
5	FW	Eric Nsabimana	11 October 1994 (aged 16)	SEC Rwanda
9	FW	Bonfils Kabanda	18 September 1994 (aged 16)	(France) AS Nancy
12	FW	Justin Mico	21 December 1994 (aged 16)	(Rwanda) Yellow Stars
17	FW	Sulaiman Kakira	30 March 1995 (aged 16)	(Rwanda) A.P.R.
19	FW	Ibrahim Itangishaka	16 September 1994 (aged 16)	SEC Rwanda
20	FW	Farouk Ruhinda	18 September 1994 (aged 16)	(Rwanda) Express

== Head-to-head record ==
The following table shows Rwanda's head-to-head record in the FIFA U-17 World Cup.

Opponent	Pld	W	D	L	GF	GA	GD	Win %
Canada	1	0	1	0	0	0	+0	0.00
England	1	0	0	1	0	2	−2	0.00
Uruguay	1	0	0	1	0	1	−1	0.00
Total	3	0	1	2	0	3	−3	0.00

== See also ==
- Rwanda national football team
- Rwanda national under-20 football team
