= Yali-Yali =

Guinean footballer

Personal information
- Full name: Mohamed Camara Yali-Yali
- Date of birth: 16 March 1985 (age 41)
- Position: Midfielder

Senior career*
Years	Team	Apps	(Gls)
- Satellite
2007–2008	Lokeren	2	(1)
- Al-Watani
2013–2015	Horoya		
- * Club domestic league appearances and goals

Mohamed Camara Yali-Yali (born 16 March 1985) is a Guinean former footballer. He spent one season with Belgian side Lokeren, and also played in Saudi Arabia with Al-Watani.

== Career statistics ==
=== Club ===
Appearances and goals by club, season and competition
Club	Season	League			Cup		Other		Total	
Club	Season	Division	Apps	Goals	Apps	Goals	Apps	Goals	Apps	Goals
Lokeren	2007–08	First Division	2	1	0	0	0	0	2	1
Career total			2	1	0	0	0	0	2	1
