= Moussa N'Diaye =

Moussa N'Diaye may refer to:

- Moussa N'Diaye (footballer, born 1979), Senegalese footballer
- Moussa Ndiaye (footballer, born 1999), Senegalese footballer
- Moussa N'Diaye (footballer, born 2002), Senegalese footballer
- Moussa Narou N'Diaye, Senegalese basketball player
