= Souleymane Faye =

Souleymane Faye is a name. People with that name include:

- Souleymane Faye (footballer), Senegalese footballer
- Souleymane Faye (linguist), Senegalese linguist
