= Mohamed Camara (footballer, born 1989) =

Guinean footballer

Personal information
- Date of birth: 6 April 1989 (age 37)
- Place of birth: Conakry, Guinea
- Position: Midfielder

Senior career*
Years	Team	Apps	(Gls)
2008–2009	Satellite		
2009–2011	Moghreb Tétouan	33	(3)
2011–2013	COD Meknès	34	(4)
2013–2015	Horoya		

International career
2012–2013	Guinea	2	(0)
- * Club domestic league appearances and goals

Mohamed Camara (born 6 April 1989) is a Guinean former footballer. He was capped twice for Guinea between 2012 and 2013.

== Career statistics ==
=== Club ===
Appearances and goals by club, season and competition
Club	Season	League			Cup		Other		Total	
Club	Season	Division	Apps	Goals	Apps	Goals	Apps	Goals	Apps	Goals
Moghreb Tétouan	2009–10	Botola	8	3	0	0	0	0	8	3
Moghreb Tétouan	2010–11	Botola	25	0	0	0	0	0	25	0
Moghreb Tétouan	Total		33	3	0	0	0	0	33	3
COD Meknès	2011–12	Botola	23	3	0	0	0	0	23	3
COD Meknès	2012–13	Botola	11	1	0	0	0	0	11	1
COD Meknès	Total		34	4	0	0	0	0	34	4
Career total			67	7	0	0	0	0	67	7

=== International ===
Appearances and goals by national team and year
National team	Year	Apps	Goals
Guinea	2012	1	0
Guinea	2013	1	0
Total		1	0
