= Mahmoud Salah (activist) =

Mahmoud Salah (1979 – March 8, 2002) was a Palestinian member of al-Aqsa Martyrs' Brigades, who was stopped by Israeli police in East Jerusalem on March 8, 2002, and shot dead some 30 minutes later.

The circumstances surrounding his killing are disputed. The AFP news agency published eleven photographs taken by an amateur photographer through his window which depict the apprehension and shooting.

Israeli police claim that Saleh had a large explosive device strapped to his waist, and that after being apprehended "attempted several times to detonate the bomb by rubbing his chest against the ground in the hope of activating the detonation switch." The police statement reported that "[i]n order to prevent the murder of the policemen and the bomb disposal officer, the suicide bomber was shot and killed by police" and "[t]he bomb was [then] dismantled with the aid of a bomb disposal robot."

The BBC and other agencies claimed there are discrepancies between the police statement, the photographs and the "testimonies of more than 10 eyewitnesses, who said the man was shot half-an-hour after his arrest when he was completely subdued."

The Urban Legends Reference Pages website concluded that "Without having all the photographs at hand, a guide to demonstrate their correct sequencing, and more non-partisan news reports or accounts of the incident, we can only state that these pictures are, as the BBC termed them, "graphic, but inconclusive."
