= Charles Tibingana =

Rwandan footballer (born 1994)

Personal information
- Full name: Charles Tibingana Mwesigye
- Date of birth: 28 August 1994 (age 32)
- Place of birth: Mbarara, Uganda
- Height: 1.73 m (5 ft 8 in)
- Position: Right winger

Senior career*
Years	Team	Apps	(Gls)
2011–2012	Proline		
2012–2013	Victoria University		
2013–2015	APR		
2015	Bullets		
2015–2017	AS Kigali		
2017	Yala United		
2018	Uttaradit		
2018–2019	Bugesera		

International career^{‡}
- Rwanda U17
- Rwanda U20
2011–2012	Rwanda	8	(0)
- * Club domestic league appearances and goals as of 18:08, 8 March 2018 (UTC) ‡ National team caps and goals as of 18:08, 8 March 2018 (UTC)

Charles Tibingana Mwesigye (born 28 August 1994) is a former footballer who played as a right winger. Born in Uganda, he represented Rwanda at international level.

== Career ==
Born in Mbarara, Uganda, Tibingana has played club football for Proline, Victoria University, APR, Bullets, AS Kigali and Yala United.

He made his senior international debut for Rwanda in 2011, and competed at the 2011 FIFA U-17 World Cup.
