= Abdoul Aziz Kaboré =

Burkinabé footballer

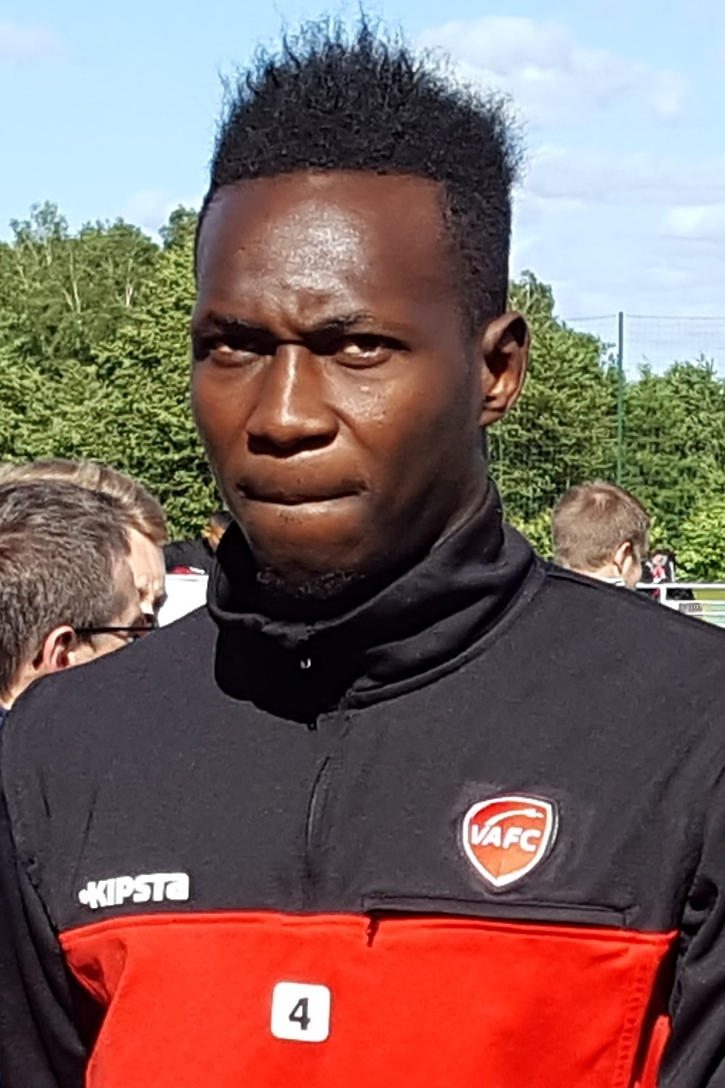
- Kaboré with Valenciennes in 2016

Personal information
- Date of birth: 1 January 1994 (age 32)
- Place of birth: Ouagadougou, Burkina Faso
- Height: 1.82 m (6 ft 0 in)
- Position: Defensive midfielder

Team information
- Current team: Bettembourg
- Number: 21

Senior career*
Years	Team	Apps	(Gls)
2011–2016	Valenciennes II	41	(6)
2013–2017	Valenciennes	49	(1)
2017–2019	Boulogne II	4	(0)
2017–2019	Boulogne	12	(0)
2019	Fleury 91	1	(0)
2019–2022	Titus Pétange	31	(0)
2021–2022	→ Dudelange (loan)	8	(1)
2022–2023	Le Touquet		
2023–2024	Aubagne	28	(2)
2024–	Bettembourg	26	(0)

International career^{‡}
2015–2016	Burkina Faso	3	(0)
- * Club domestic league appearances and goals as of 26 June 2025 ‡ National team caps and goals as of 09:57, 6 February 2022 (UTC)

Abdoul Aziz Kaboré (born 1 January 1994) is a Burkinabé professional footballer who plays as a defensive midfielder for Luxembourgish team Bettembourg. Between 2015 and 2016, he made three appearances for the Burkina Faso national team.

== Career ==
Born in Ouagadougou, Kaboré spent his early career playing for French teams Valenciennes and Boulogne. He moved to Fleury 91 in January 2019. Ahead of the 2019–20 season, he then joined Luxembourgish team Union Titus Pétange.

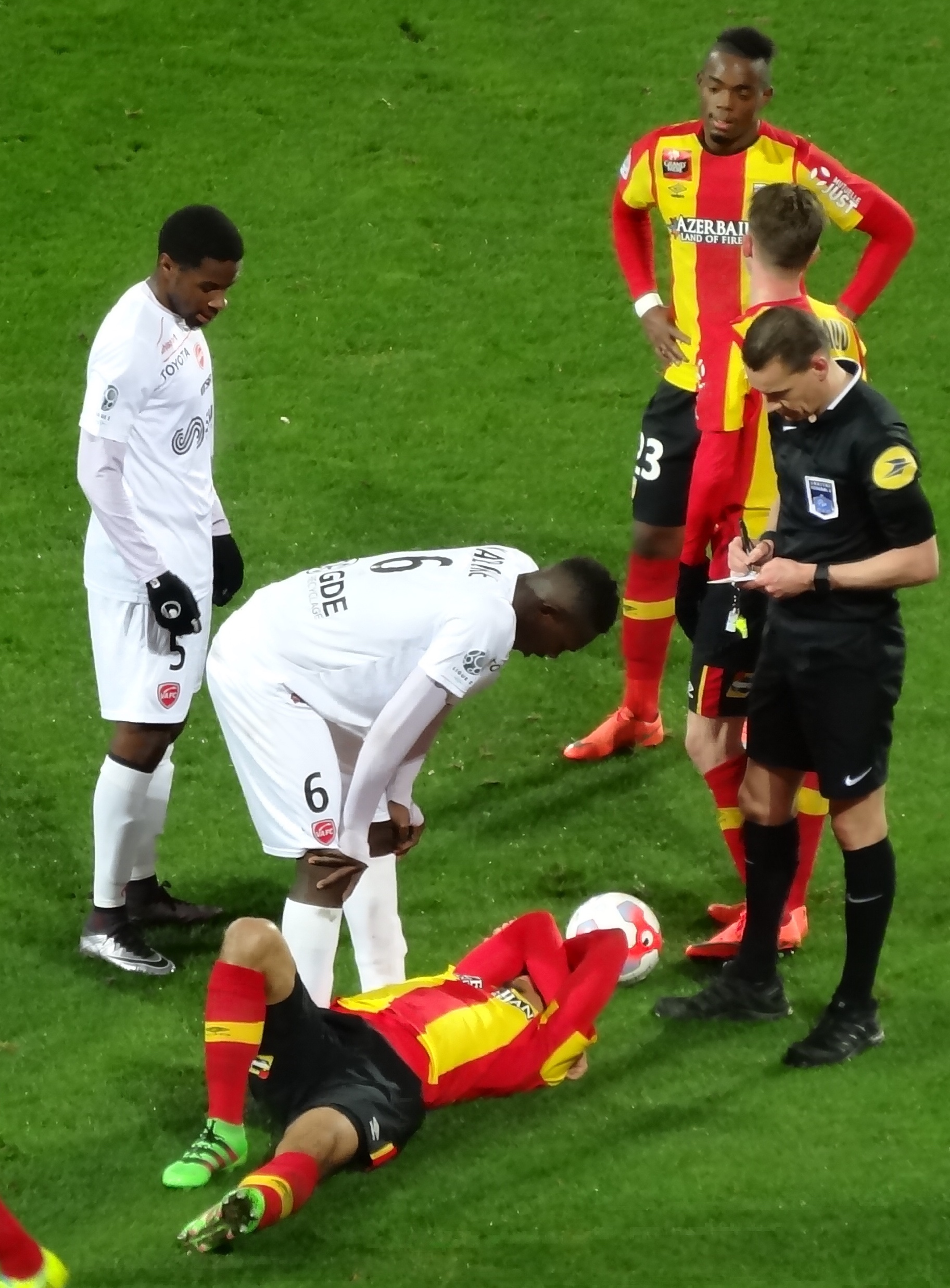
Kaboré (second left) with Valenciennes.

He made his senior international debut for Burkina Faso in 2015.
