= Mohamed Camara (footballer, born 1981) =

Sierra Leonean footballer (born 1981)

Personal information
- Date of birth: 27 December 1981 (age 44)
- Height: 1.80 m (5 ft 11 in)
- Position: Midfielder

Senior career*
Years	Team	Apps	(Gls)
2001	Fakel	1	(0)
2002–2003	Dynamo Saint Petersburg		
- * Club domestic league appearances and goals

Mohamed Camara (born 27 December 1981) is a Sierra Leonean former footballer. He spent one season with Russian side Fakel.

== Career statistics ==
=== Club ===
Appearances and goals by club, season and competition
Club	Season	League			Cup		Other		Total	
Club	Season	Division	Apps	Goals	Apps	Goals	Apps	Goals	Apps	Goals
Fakel	2001	Russian Top Division	1	0	0	0	0	0	1	0
Career total			1	0	0	0	0	0	1	0
