= Usengimana Faustin =

Rwandan international footballer

Personal information
- Place of birth: Kicukiro, Rwanda
- Height: 1.89 m (6 ft 2 in)
- Position: Center-back

Team information
- Current team: Masafi Al-Wasat SC
- Number: 15

Senior career*
| Years | Team | Apps | (Gls) |
| 2010–2015 | Rayon Sports | | |
| 2015–2017 | APR FC | | |
| 2017–2018 | Rayon Sports | | |
| 2018–2019 | Khaitan SC | | |
| 2019–2020 | Buildcon | | |
| 2020–2022 | Police FC | | |
| 2022 | Al-Qasim SC | | |

International career
| 2012–2019 | Rwanda | 31 | (0) |
- * Club domestic league appearances and goals

Usengimana Faustin (/uːsɛɪŋɡɪmɑːnɑː/; born 11 June 1994) is a Rwandan international professional footballer who played as a center-back for Masafi Al-Wasat SC. Usengimana Faustin is the one highest paid Rwandan professional footballers.

== Club career ==
In August 2021, Usengimana joined the Zambian club Buildcon, on a three-year contract for a fee of $45.000 per year. He played for various teams in Rwanda including Rayon Sports and APR FC.

Usengimana helped Rayon Sports to reach the group stage of the CAF Confederations Cup for the first time in history in 2018.

He also played for the National Team at all levels including the Under-17 World Cup in Mexico, for the Under-17s. 20 and 23 with the Rwanda National Team.
