= Egypt national under-17 football team =

National under-17 association football team representing Egypt

Egypt U-17
- Nickname: الفراعنة (The Pharaohs)
- Association: Egyptian Football Association
- Confederation: CAF (Africa)
- Head coach: Ahmed El-Kass
- Captain: Belal Attia
- Home stadium: Cairo International Stadium
- FIFA code: EGY
| First colours | Second colours |

African U-17 Championship
- Appearances: 3 (first in 1997)
- Best result: Champions (1997)

FIFA U-17 World Cup
- Appearances: 3 (first in 1987)
- Best result: Quarter-final (1997)

The Egypt national under-17 football team (Arabic: منتخب مصر الوطني تحت 17 سنة), nicknamed The Pharaohs (Arabic: الفراعنة), is the national U-17 football team of Egypt. It is administered by the Egyptian Football Association.

== Tournament Records ==
=== FIFA U-16 and U-17 World Cup record ===
FIFA U-17 World Cup
| Year | Round | PLD | W | D* | L | GS | GA |
|---|---|---|---|---|---|---|---|
| (China) 1985 | did not qualify | | | | | | |
| (Canada) 1987 | Group stage | 3 | 1 | 0 | 2 | 3 | 2 |
| (Scotland) 1989 | did not qualify | | | | | | |
| (Italy) 1991 | Disqualified | | | | | | |
| (Japan) 1993 | did not qualify | | | | | | |
| (Ecuador) 1995 | did not qualify | | | | | | |
| (Egypt) 1997 | Quarter-finals | 4 | 1 | 2 | 1 | 6 | 6 |
| (New Zealand) 1999 | did not qualify | | | | | | |
| (Trinidad and Tobago) 2001 | Withdrew | | | | | | |
| (Finland) 2003 | did not qualify | | | | | | |
| (Peru) 2005 | Withdrew | | | | | | |
| (South Korea) 2007 | did not qualify | | | | | | |
| (Nigeria) 2009 | did not participate | | | | | | |
| (Mexico) 2011 | did not qualify | | | | | | |
| (United Arab Emirates) 2013 | Withdrew | | | | | | |
| (Chile) 2015 | did not qualify | | | | | | |
| (India) 2017 | did not qualify | | | | | | |
| (Brazil) 2019 | did not participate | | | | | | |
| (Indonesia) 2023 | did not qualify | | | | | | |
| (Qatar) 2025 | Round of 32 | 4 | 1 | 1 | 2 | 6 | 8 |
| (Qatar) 2026 | In progress | 0 | 0 | 0 | 0 | 0 | 0 |
| Total:4/21 | Quarter-finals | 11 | 3 | 3 | 5 | 15 | 16 |

=== CAF U-17 Championship record ===
African U-17 Championship
| Year | Round | PLD | W | D* | L | GS | GA |
|---|---|---|---|---|---|---|---|
| (Mali) 1995 | did not qualify | | | | | | |
| (Botswana) 1997 | Champions | 5 | 4 | 1 | 0 | 6 | 0 |
| (Guinea) 1999 | did not qualify | | | | | | |
| (Seychelles) 2001 | Withdrew | | | | | | |
| (Eswatini) 2003 | Fourth place | 5 | 2 | 1 | 2 | 4 | 5 |
| (The Gambia) 2005 | Withdrew | | | | | | |
| (Togo) 2007 | did not qualify | | | | | | |
| (Algeria) 2009 | did not participate | | | | | | |
| (Rwanda) 2011 | Group stage | 3 | 1 | 0 | 2 | 2 | 6 |
| (Morocco) 2013 | Withdrew | | | | | | |
| (Niger) 2015 | did not qualify | | | | | | |
| (Gabon) 2017 | did not qualify | | | | | | |
| (Cameroon) 2019 | did not participate | | | | | | |
| (Morocco) ~~2021~~ | Cancelled | | | | | | |
| (Algeria) 2023 | did not qualify | | | | | | |
| (Morocco) 2025 | Group stage | 3 | 1 | 0 | 2 | 6 | 7 |
| (Morocco) 2026 | 3rd place | 6 | 3 | 1 | 2 | 9 | 4 |
| Total | 5/17 | 22 | 11 | 4 | 6 | 27 | 22 |

=== UNAF U-17 Tournament record ===
UNAF U-17 Tournament record
| Year | Round | Position | Pld | W | D* | L | GF | GA |
|---|---|---|---|---|---|---|---|---|
| (Algeria) 2006 | Third Place | 3rd | 2 | 0 | 2 | 0 | 0 | 0 |
| (Morocco) 2007 | Did not enter | | | | | | | |
| (Tunisia) Mar 2008 | Did not enter | | | | | | | |
| (Algeria) Dec 2008 | Did not enter | | | | | | | |
| (Tunisia) 2009 | Did not enter | | | | | | | |
| (Tunisia) 2010 | Did not enter | | | | | | | |
| (Morocco) 2011 | Did not enter | | | | | | | |
| (Tunisia) Mar 2012 | Did not enter | | | | | | | |
| (Morocco) Dec 2012 | Did not enter | | | | | | | |
| (Morocco) 2014 | Champions | 1st | 2 | 2 | 0 | 0 | 7 | 2 |
| (Morocco) 2016 | Fourth Place | 4th | 4 | 0 | 2 | 2 | 3 | 4 |
| (Morocco) 2017 | Did not enter | | | | | | | |
| (Tunisia) Aug 2018 | Withdrew | | | | | | | |
| (Morocco) Dec 2018 | Withdrew | | | | | | | |
| (Algeria) 2021 | Withdrew | | | | | | | |
| (Algeria) Mar 2022 | Champions | 1st | 4 | 4 | 0 | 0 | 9 | 2 |
| (Algeria) Nov 2022 | Runners-up | 2nd | 3 | 1 | 0 | 2 | 5 | 5 |
| (Algeria) Apr 2024 | Champions | 1st | 4 | 2 | 2 | 0 | 7 | 4 |
| (Morocco) Nov 2024 | Champions | 1st | 4 | 3 | 0 | 1 | 13 | 9 |
| (Libya) Apr 2026 | Third Place | 3rd | 4 | 2 | 0 | 2 | 4 | 4 |
| (Tunisia) Nov 2026 | To be determined | | | | | | | |
| Total | 4 Titles | 8/21 | 27 | 14 | 6 | 7 | 48 | 8 |

=== UNAF U-16 Tournament ===
UNAF U-16 Tournament record
| Year | Round | Position | Pld | W | D* | L | GF | GA |
|---|---|---|---|---|---|---|---|---|
| (Morocco) 2009 | Did not enter | | | | | | | |
| (Morocco) 2015 | Did not enter | | | | | | | |
| (Tunisia) 2026 | Did not enter | | | | | | | |
| Total | | 0/3 | | | | | | |

=== CAF U-16 and U-17 World Cup Qualifiers record ===
CAF U-16 and U-17 World Cup Qualifiers
Appearances: 4
| Year | Round | Position | Pld | W | D* | L | GF | GA |
|---|---|---|---|---|---|---|---|---|
| 1985 | Second round | | 2 | 0 | 1 | 1 | 1 | 2 |
| 1987 | Third round | | 2 | 1 | 1 | 0 | 2 | 2 |
| 1989 | Third round | | 4 | 2 | 0 | 2 | 3 | 2 |
| 1991 | Disqualified | | | | | | | |
| 1993 | Final Round | | 2 | 0 | 0 | 2 | 0 | 5 |
| Total | 4/5 | Final round | 10 | 3 | 2 | 5 | 6 | 11 |

=== Arab Cup U-17 Tournament record ===
Arab Cup U-17
| Year | Round | PLD | W | D* | L | GS | GA |
|---|---|---|---|---|---|---|---|
| (Saudi Arabia) 2011 | did not enter | | | | | | |
| (Tunisia) 2012 | did not enter | | | | | | |
| (Qatar) 2014 | did not enter | | | | | | |
| (Morocco) ~~2021~~ | Cancelled | | | | | | |
| (Algeria) 2022 | Quarter Final | 4 | 3 | 0 | 1 | 17 | 2 |
| Total | Quarter Final | 4 | 3 | 0 | 1 | 17 | 2 |

- Red border color indicates tournament was held on home soil.

*Draws include knockout matches decided on penalty kicks.

== Players ==
=== Current squad ===
The following players were called up to the squad for the 2026 U-17 Africa Cup of Nations to be played between 13 May and 2 June 2026.

| No. | Pos. | Player | Date of birth (age) | Club |
|---|---|---|---|---|
| 1 | GK | Mohamed Ebeid | | (Egyptian Football Association) Al Ahly |
| 16 | GK | Malek Amr | | (Egyptian Football Association) Zamalek |
| 3 | DF | Adam Mohamed Youssef | | (Egyptian Football Association) Al Ahly |
| 4 | DF | Yassin Tamer | | (Egyptian Football Association) Al Mokawloon |
| 6 | DF | Adel Alaa | | (Egyptian Football Association) Ghazl El Mahalla |
| 12 | DF | Amier Hassan | 18 January 2009 (age 17) | (Royal Dutch Football Association) Utrecht |
| | DF | Seif El Mahdy | | (Egyptian Football Association) Al Ahly |
| 7 | DF | Mohamed Gamal | | (Egyptian Football Association) ENPPI |
| 2 | DF | Mohamed El Sayed | | (Egyptian Football Association) Al Ahly |
| | MF | Omar Fouda | 2 April 2009 (age 17) | (United Arab Emirates Football Association) Al-Jazira |
| 15 | MF | Omar Abdelrahim | | (Egyptian Football Association) Al Ahly |
| 18 | MF | Seif Karim | | (Egyptian Football Association) Al Ahly |
| 22 | MF | Baraa Mahmoud Galal | | (Egyptian Football Association) ZED |
| 25 | MF | Ahmed Beshir | | (Egyptian Football Association) Ceramica Cleopatra |
| 10 | MF | Ahmed Safwat | | (Egyptian Football Association) Zamalek |
| 13 | FW | Youssef Othman | | (Egyptian Football Association) ZED |
| 24 | FW | Ziad Saoudi | | (Egyptian Football Association) Pyramids |
| | FW | Abdallah Amr | | (Egyptian Football Association) ENPPI |
| 11 | FW | Daniel Tamer | | (Egyptian Football Association) ZED |
| | FW | Amir Abou Elezz | 11 June 2009 (age 17) | (Italian Football Federation) Monza |
| 9 | FW | Adham Hasseib | | (Egyptian Football Association) Zamalek |
| 17 | FW | Evouna | | (Egyptian Football Association) Al Ahly |
| 19 | FW | Khaled Mokhtar | 13 January 2009 (age 17) | (Egyptian Football Association) ZED |

== See also ==
- Egypt national football team
- Egypt Olympic football team
- Egypt national under-20 football team
- U-17 Africa Cup of Nations
