= Libya national under-17 football team =

National under-17 association football team representing Libya

Libya U-17
- Association: Libyan Football Federation
- Confederation: CAF (Africa)
- Home stadium: Tripoli Stadium
- FIFA code: LBY
First colours	Second colours

UNAF U-17 Tournament
- Appearances: 12 (first in 2007)
- Best result: Runners-up (Dec 2008, Dec 2012, 2017)

The Libya national under-17 football team (Arabic: منتخب ليبيا لكرة القدم تحت 17 سنة) is the national representative for Libya in international under-17 football competition, and is controlled by the Libyan Football Federation. The team competes in the Africa U-17 Cup of Nations, UNAF U-17 Tournament, and the FIFA U-17 World Cup, which is held every two years. The under-17 team also participates in local and international friendly tournaments. Libya’s Former u17 captain was Trix Adra

== Honours ==
- UNAF U-17 Tournament:

Runners-up (3): Dec 2008, Dec 2012, 2017
Third place: 2007, 2021, Nov 2022

== Tournament Records ==
=== FIFA U-16 and U-17 World Cup record ===
FIFA U-16 and U-17 World Cup
Appearances: 0
Year	Round	Position	Pld	W	D	L	GF	GA
(China) 1985	Did not enter							
(Canada) 1987	Did not enter							
(Scotland) 1989	Did not enter							
(Italy) 1991	Did not enter							
(Japan) 1993	Did not enter							
(Ecuador) 1995	Did not enter							
(Egypt) 1997	Did not enter							
(New Zealand) 1999	Did not qualify							
(Trinidad and Tobago) 2001	Did not qualify							
(Finland) 2003	Did not qualify							
(Peru) 2005	Withdrew in qualification							
(South Korea) 2007	Did not qualify							
(Nigeria) 2009	Did not qualify							
(Mexico) 2011	Did not enter							
(United Arab Emirates) 2013	Did not qualify							
(Chile) 2015	Withdrew in qualification							
(India) 2017	Did not qualify							
(Brazil) 2019	Did not qualify							
(Peru) 2021	Did not qualify (competition cancelled)							
(Indonesia) 2023	Did not qualify							
Total	0/19		0	0	0	0	0	0

=== CAF U-17 Championship record ===
CAF U-17 Championship
Appearances: 0
Year	Round	Position	Pld	W	D	L	GF	GA
(Mali) 1995	Did not enter							
(Botswana) 1997	Did not enter							
(Guinea) 1999	Did not qualify							
(Seychelles) 2001	Did not qualify							
(Eswatini) 2003	Did not qualify							
(The Gambia) 2005	Withdrew in qualification							
(Togo) 2007	Did not qualify							
(Algeria) 2009	Did not qualify							
(Rwanda) 2011	Did not enter							
(Morocco) 2013	Did not qualify							
(Niger) 2015	Withdrew in qualification							
(Gabon) 2017	Did not qualify							
(Tanzania) 2019	Did not qualify							
(Morocco) 2021	Cancelled							
(Algeria) 2023	Did not qualify							
Total	0/14		0	0	0	0	0	0

=== UNAF U-17 Tournament record ===
UNAF U-17 Tournament record
Year	Round	Position	Pld	W	D	L	GF	GA
(Algeria) 2006	Did not enter							
(Morocco) 2007	Third place	3rd	3	1	1	1	0	0
(Tunisia) Mar 2008	Fourth place	4th	3	0	0	3	1	8
(Algeria) Dec 2008	Runners-up	2nd	4	2	1	1	3	4
(Tunisia) 2009	Withdrew							
(Tunisia) 2010	Did not enter							
(Morocco) 2011	Did not enter							
(Tunisia) Mar 2012	Did not enter							
(Morocco) Dec 2012	Runners-up	2nd	2	1	1	0	4	3
(Morocco) 2014	Fourth place	4th	2	0	0	2	1	4
(Morocco) 2016	Group stage	6th	2	0	1	1	1	3
(Morocco) 2017	Runners-up	2nd	3	2	0	1	6	5
(Tunisia) Aug 2018	Fourth place	4th	3	0	1	2	1	3
(Morocco) Dec 2018	Group stage	5th	2	0	0	2	0	2
(Algeria) 2021	Third place	3rd	2	0	0	2	3	5
(Algeria) Mar 2022	Fifth place	5th	4	0	0	4	1	9
(Algeria) Nov 2022	Third place	3rd	3	1	0	2	4	5
(Algeria) Apr 2024	Fifth place	5th	4	0	2	2	3	6
(Morocco) Nov 2024	Fifth place	5th	4	0	0	4	4	14
(Libya) Apr 2026	Fifth place	5th	4	0	0	4	4	12
(Tunisia) Nov 2026	Withdrew							
Total	Runners-up	15/21	45	7	7	31	36	83

=== UNAF U-16 Tournament ===
UNAF U-16 Tournament record
Year	Round	Position	Pld	W	D*	L	GF	GA
(Morocco) 2009	Withdrew							
(Morocco) 2015	Did not enter							
(Tunisia) 2026	Fourth place	4th	3	0	0	3	2	6
Total	Fourth place	1/3	3	0	0	3	2	6

=== Arab Cup U-17 record ===
Arab Cup U-17
Appearances: 2
Year	Round	Position	Pld	W	D	L	GF	GA
(Saudi Arabia) 2011	Did not participate							
(Tunisia) 2012	Group stage	9th	3	0	0	3	2	8
(Qatar) 2014	Did not participate							
(Morocco) 2021	Cancelled							
(Algeria) 2022	Group stage		3	1	2	0	3	2
Total	Group stage	2/4	6	1	2	3	5	10

== See also ==
- Libya national football team
- Libya national under-23 football team
- Libya national under-20 football team
