= 2026 UNAF U-17 Tournament (Tunisia) =

Tournament details
- Country: Tunisia
- Dates: 10–16 November
- Teams: 4

Final positions
- Champions: Algeria (5th title)
- Runners-up: Egypt
- Third place: Morocco

Tournament statistics
- Matches played: 6
- Goals scored: 17 (2.83 per match)

Awards
- Best player: (Algeria) Mohamed Yacin Meguenni

The 2026 UNAF U-17 Tournament (Tunisia) officially named TotalEnergies U-17 Africa Cup of Nations - UNAF Qualifiers 2027 will be the 21st edition of the UNAF U-17 Tournament and will be held in held in Monastir and Sousse, Tunisia between 10 and 16 November 2026. The tournament also served as the qualifiers for the 2027 U-17 Africa Cup of Nations.

== Participants ==
The five participating teams were:

- Algeria
- Egypt
- Morocco (Holders)
- ~~Libya~~ (Withdrew)
- Tunisia (Hosts)

On 3 November 2026, UNAF received a communication from the Libyan Football Federation stating that the Libyan U-17 team was withdrawing from the tournament.

== Venues ==
Monastir	Sousse
Mustapha Ben Jannet Stadium	Sousse Olympic Stadium
Capacity: 20,000	Capacity: 40,000

== Match officials ==
On 6 November 2026, UNAF announced a total of 6 referees and 5 assistant referees appointed for the tournament.

Referees

- (Algeria) Rafik Aouina
- (Chad) Abdulrahman Adoum
- (Egypt) Mohamed Tabei Ghazi
- (Libya) Abdelouahed Haridioua
- (Morocco) Naoufel Nachit
- (Tunisia) Bassem Belaid

Assistant referees

- (Algeria) Haithem Bouima
- (Egypt) Youssef Bassati
- (Libya) Salem Mrakbi
- (Morocco) Achref Rihan
- (Tunisia) Youssef Jammi

== Tournament ==
The tournament schedule was reset following Libya's withdrawal on the same day.

Pos	Team	Pld	W	D	L	GF	GA	GD	Pts	Qualification
1	Algeria	3	2	0	1	3	4	−1	6	Final tournament
2	Egypt	3	2	0	1	3	2	+1	6	Final tournament
3	Morocco	3	1	0	2	5	3	+2	3	Final tournament as the host nation
4	Tunisia (H)	3	1	0	2	6	8	−2	3	

Source: UNAF
(H) Hosts

=== Matches ===
10 November 2026
14:00

Algeria	1–0	Morocco
Ziane 41'	Report

Sousse Olympic Stadium, Sousse
Referee: Abdulrahman Adoum (Chad)
10 November 2026
17:00

Tunisia	1–2	Egypt
Zribi 20'	Report	Shaboun 9', 89'

Sousse Olympic Stadium, Sousse
Referee: Abdelouahed Haridioua (Libya)

13 November 2026
14:00

Tunisia	4–1	Algeria
Hassan 36', 65'; Kahrmani 73' (pen.); Ben Hssine 89'	Report	Abed 23'

Sousse Olympic Stadium, Sousse
Referee: Naoufel Nachit (Morocco)
13 November 2026
17:00

Egypt	1–0	Morocco
Ali 11'	Report

Sousse Olympic Stadium, Sousse
Referee: Rafik Aouina (Algeria)

16 November 2026
14:00

Tunisia	1–5	Morocco
Abdelbaki 60'	Report	Dabdoubi 24'; Ait Hammou 85'; Jadid 89', 90+2' (pen.), 90+4'

Sousse Olympic Stadium, Sousse
Referee: Mohamed Tabei Ghazi (Egypt)
16 November 2026
14:00

Algeria	1–0	Egypt
Daoud 8'	Report

Mustapha Ben Jannet Stadium, Monastir
Referee: Bassem Belaid (Tunisia)

== Qualified teams for U-17 Africa Cup of Nations ==
The following three teams from UNAF qualified for the 2027 U-17 Africa Cup of Nations. Morocco qualified automatically as hosts.

Team	Qualified on	Previous appearances in U-17 Africa Cup of Nations^{1}
Morocco	10 August 2026	5 (2013, 2019, 2023, **2025**, 2026)
Egypt	16 November 2026	5 (**1997**, 2003, 2011, 2025, 2026)
Algeria	16 November 2026	3 (2009, 2023, 2026)

^{1} Bold indicates champion for that year. Italic indicates host for that year.
