= 2024 UNAF U-17 Tournament =

دورة اتحاد شمال افريقيا لكرة القدم 2024

Tournament details
- Host country: Algeria
- Dates: 18–26 April 2024
- Teams: 5
- Venues: 2 (in 1 host city)

Final positions
- Champions: Egypt (3rd title)
- Runners-up: Algeria
- Third place: Morocco

Tournament statistics
- Matches played: 10
- Goals scored: 24 (2.4 per match)
- Top scorer(s): (Egypt) Hamza Abdelkarim (3 goals)
- Best player: (Egypt) Hamza Abdelkarim

The 2024 UNAF U-17 Tournament is the 18th edition of the UNAF U-17 Tournament. The tournament took place in Algeria between 18 and 26 April 2024. Egypt won the tournament.

== Participants ==
- Algeria (hosts)
- Egypt
- Libya
- Morocco
- Tunisia

== Venues ==
Two venues from Algiers hosts the tournament.

Cities	Venues	Capacity
Rouïba, Algiers	Salem Mabrouki Stadium	12,000
Algiers	Omar Hamadi Stadium	17,500
Dar El Beïda, Algiers	Omar Benrabah Stadium	14,150

== Match officials ==
=== Referees ===
- (Algeria) Anes Azrin
- (Egypt) Mohamed Ibrahim Nasef
- (Libya) Ali Al-Jareh
- (Morocco) Abdelmonem Bouslam
- (Tunisia) Khalil Trabelsi

=== Assistant referees ===
- (Algeria) Akram Sohbi
- (Algeria) Mustapha Guessar
- (Egypt) Ahmed Mostafa Zidan
- (Egypt) Ahmed Adel Ismael
- (Libya) Ali Meftah
- (Libya) Ali Nasr Basheer
- (Morocco) Ismail Belmeknassi
- (Morocco) Mehdi Mounadhim
- (Tunisia) Wissam Boughatas
- (Tunisia) Wassim Hannachi

== Tournament ==
Pos	Team	Pld	W	D	L	GF	GA	GD	Pts	Qualification
1	Egypt	4	2	2	0	7	4	+3	8	Winners
2	Algeria (H)	4	1	3	0	5	3	+2	6	
3	Morocco	4	1	2	1	5	6	−1	5	
4	Tunisia	4	0	3	1	4	5	−1	3	
5	Libya	4	0	2	2	3	6	−3	2	

Source: UNAF
Rules for classification: 1) Points; 2) Goal difference; 3) Goals scored
(H) Hosts

=== Matches ===
All times are local, WAT/CET (UTC+1).

18 April 2024
15:00

Egypt	1–1	Tunisia
Hamza Abdel Karim 64'	Report	Benmacha 4'

Salem Mabrouki Stadium, Rouïba
Referee: Anes Azrin (Algeria)
18 April 2024
18:00

Morocco	1–1	Algeria
Ouazrhari 69'	Report	Mekhalfia 80+4'

Salem Mabrouki Stadium, Rouïba
Referee: Mahmoud Nasef (Egypt)

20 April 2024
15:00

Tunisia	1–2	Morocco
Abdeli 11'		Akhdiuo 48'; Abdelkader 67'

Omar Hamadi Stadium, Algiers
Referee: Ali Al-Jareh (Libya)
20 April 2024
18:00

Egypt	2–1	Libya
Abdelaziz El Zoghbi 15'; Omar Azab 80+3'	Report	Al-Mundhir 69'

Omar Hamadi Stadium, Algiers
Referee: Abdelmonem Bouslam (Morocco)

22 April 2024
15:00

Libya	1–1	Morocco
Bendaou 11'		Rachidi 65'

Salem Mabrouki Stadium, Rouïba
Referee: Khalil Trabelsi (Tunisia)
22 April 2024
18:00

Algeria	1–1	Tunisia
Mansouri 4'	Report	Bouslama 80'

Salem Mabrouki Stadium, Rouïba
Referee: Abdelmonem Bouslam (Morocco)

24 April 2024
15:00

Libya	0–2	Algeria
	Report	Maamar 32' (o.g.); Tarzout 64' (pen.)

Omar Benrabah Stadium, Dar El Beïda
Referee: Khalil Trabelsi (Tunisia)
24 April 2024
18:00

Morocco	1–3	Egypt
El Jamali 80+1' (pen.)		Mohamed Bendary 17'; Hamza Abdel Karim 35'; Gomaa 78'

Omar Benrabah Stadium, Dar El Beïda
Referee: Anes Azrin (Algeria)

26 April 2024
15:00

Tunisia	1–1	Libya
Aziz 10'		Tareq 49' (pen.)

Salem Mabrouki Stadium, Rouïba
Referee: Mahmoud Nasef (Egypt)
26 April 2024
18:00

Algeria	1–1	Egypt
Fettouche 67'		Hamza Abdel Karim 63'

Salem Mabrouki Stadium, Rouïba
Referee: Ali Al-Jareh (Libya)

== Statistics ==
=== Goalscorers ===
There were 24 goals scored in 10 matches, for an average of 2.4 goals per match.

3 goals

- (Egypt) Hamza Abdel Karim

1 goal

- (Algeria) Benaissa Fettouche
- (Algeria) Abdeldjalil Mansouri
- (Algeria) Adem Mekhalfia
- (Algeria) Houssam Tarzout
- (Egypt) Mohamed Sherif Bendary
- (Egypt) Karim Gomaa
- (Egypt) Abdelaziz El Zoghbi
- (Egypt) Omar Ahmed Azab
- (Libya) Jamal Al-Mundhir
- (Libya) Sanad Hussein Bendaou
- (Libya) Jafar Tareq
- (Morocco) Naoufel Abdelkader
- (Morocco) Rayane Akhdiuo
- (Morocco) Nadir El Jamali
- (Morocco) Mohamed Rachidi
- (Morocco) Bilal Ouazrhari
- (Tunisia) Chihab Abdeli
- (Tunisia) Mohamed Aziz
- (Tunisia) Qusai Benmacha
- (Tunisia) Mohalmed Hedi Bouslama

1 own goal

- (Libya) Mohamed Maamar (against Algeria)
