= Football at the 2019 African Games – Men's tournament =

2019 African Games men's football tournament
Tournament details
- Host country: Morocco
- Cities: Salé; El Mansouria
- Dates: 16–30 August
- Teams: 8 (from 1 confederation)
- Venues: 2 (in 2 host cities)

Final positions
- Champions: Burkina Faso (1st title)
- Runners-up: Nigeria
- Third place: Senegal
- Fourth place: Mali

Tournament statistics
- Matches played: 15
- Goals scored: 34 (2.27 per match)
- Top scorer(s): (Burkina Faso) Djibril Ouattara (Ghana) Tahiru Awudu (4 goals each)

The 2019 African Games men's football tournament was the 12th edition of the African Games men's football tournament. The men's football tournament was held as part of the 2019 African Games between 16–30 August 2019. Under-20 national teams took part in the tournament.

== Teams ==
Initially, qualification for the African Games tournament was shared with that of the 2019 Africa U-23 Cup of Nations. Following the delay of the third round of qualification from June to September 2019 (after the African Games vent), CAF selected representative teams from nations that had participated in the 2019 Africa U-20 Cup of Nations with the exception of Niger (host) who was replaced by Morocco.

- Morocco (hosts)
- Burkina Faso
- Burundi
- Ghana
- Mali
- Nigeria
- South Africa
- Senegal

== Officials ==
Referees

- (Central African Republic) André Kolissala
- (Republic of the Congo) Juste Kokolo
- (Egypt) Mohamed Adel
- (Liberia) Jerry Yekeh
- (Mauritania) Babacar Sarr
- (Morocco) Jalal Jayed
- (Morocco) Adil Zourak
- (Nigeria) Quadri Adebimpe
- (Somalia) Omar Artan
- (South Africa) Eugene Mdluli
- (South Sudan) Ring Malong
- (Togo) Komlanvi Aklassou

Assistant Referees

- (Djibouti) Rachid Waiss
- (Equatorial Guinea) Dalmacio Obono
- (Ghana) Kwasi Brobbey
- (Morocco) Hicham Ait Abbou
- (Morocco) Zakaria Brinsi
- (Morocco) Hamza Naciri
- (Morocco) Yahya Nouali
- (Nigeria) Efosa Celestine
- (Sierra Leone) Ibrahim Bah
- (Zambia) Meck Zulu
- (Zimbabwe) Edgar Rumeck

== Venues ==
Kenitra	Rabat	Salé
Stade Municipal	Stade Moulay Hassan	Sports Center of FAR
34.2525°N 6.571389°W	33.9758°N 6.824249°W	34.038°N 6.725669°W
Capacity: 15,000	Capacity: 12,000	Capacity: 500
Football at the 2019 African Games – Men's tournament is located in Morocco

== Group stage ==
=== Group A ===
Pos	Team	Pld	W	D	L	GF	GA	GD	Pts	Qualification
1	Burkina Faso	3	2	1	0	7	1	+6	7	Knockout stage
2	Nigeria	3	1	2	0	5	4	+1	5	Knockout stage
3	Morocco (H)	3	1	1	1	3	4	−1	4	
4	South Africa	3	0	0	3	1	7	−6	0	

Source: African Games
(H) Hosts
16 August 2019
13:00

Nigeria	1–1	Burkina Faso
Ghali 58'	Report	Nikiema 72'

Sports Center of FAR, Salé
Referee: Ring Malong (South Sudan)
16 August 2019
17:00

Morocco	1–0 Awarded (Note: On 18 August 2019, CAF announced that the match was declared a 1–0 forfeit victory to Morocco, as the South African team was not able to register the squad on time after they reached Morocco on the matchday itself.)	South Africa
	Report

Sports Center of FAR, Salé
Referee: Babacar Sarr (Mauritania)

20 August 2019
13:00

South Africa	1–2	Nigeria
Mashiane 55'	Report	Sor 27'; Ghali 76'

Sports Center of FAR, Salé
Referee: Komlanvi Aklassou (Togo)
20 August 2019
17:00

Burkina Faso	2–0	Morocco
I. Ouattara 31'; Dianda 58'	Report

Sports Center of FAR, Salé
Referee: Omar Artan (Somalia)

23 August 2019
17:30

Morocco	2–2	Nigeria
Abba 13'; Moutaraji 54' (pen.)	Report	Ibrahim 45' (pen.); Emeka 90+3'

Sports Center of FAR, Salé
Referee: Babacar Sarr (Mauritania)
23 August 2019
17:30

South Africa	0–4	Burkina Faso
	Report	Dianda 19'; D. Ouattara 45', 52'; Nkabinde 67' (o.g.)

Stade Municipal, El Mansouria
Referee: André Kolissala (Central African Republic)

=== Group B ===
Pos	Team	Pld	W	D	L	GF	GA	GD	Pts	Qualification
1	Mali	3	2	1	0	7	2	+5	7	Knockout stage
2	Senegal	3	2	1	0	3	0	+3	7	Knockout stage
3	Ghana	3	1	0	2	4	6	−2	3	
4	Burundi	3	0	0	3	1	7	−6	0	

Source: AAF
17 August 2019
13:00

Senegal	0–0	Mali
	Report

Stade Municipal, El Mansouria
Referee: Jalal Jayed (Morocco)
17 August 2019
17:00

Burundi	1–2	Ghana
Mavugo 43'	Report	Awudu 18', 20'

Stade Municipal, El Mansouria
Referee: Eugène Mdluli (South Africa)

21 August 2019
13:00

Mali	3–0	Burundi
Kanou 2', 27' (pen.); Diarra 37'	Report

Stade Municipal, El Mansouria
Referee: Quadri Adebimpe (Nigeria)
21 August 2019
17:00

Ghana	0–1	Senegal
	Report	Dramé 10'

Stade Municipal, El Mansouria
Referee: Mohamed Adel (Egypt)

24 August 2019
17:30

Senegal	2–0	Burundi
Badji 60'; War 90'	Report

Stade Municipal, El Mansouria
Referee: Jerry Yekeh (Liberia)
24 August 2019
17:30

Mali	4–2	Ghana
Dramé 11'; Kanou 41'; Sangaré 59', 60'	Report	Awudu 47', 67'

Sports Center of FAR, Salé
Referee: Adil Zourak (Morocco)

== Knockout stage ==
=== Bracket ===
Semi-finals
27 August – Sports Center of FAR
Senegal	1 (4)
Burkina Faso (p)	1 (5)
27 August – Sports Center of FAR
Mali	0 (4)
Nigeria (p)	0 (5)

Final
30 August – Stade Boubker Ammar
Burkina Faso	2
Nigeria	0
Third place
29 August – Stade Municipal
Mali	0 (3)
Senegal	0 (4)

=== Semi-finals ===
27 August 2019
13:00

Mali	0–0 (a.e.t.)	Nigeria
	Report
Penalties
Sangaré (penalty scored); Kamaté (penalty scored); Tangara (penalty scored); Koné (penalty scored)	4–5	(penalty missed) Zaruma; (penalty missed) Rabiu; (penalty missed) Emeka; (penalty scored) Ibrahim; (penalty scored) Makanjuola; (penalty scored) Nnoshiri; (penalty scored) Adeshina; (penalty scored) Oladoye

Sports Center of FAR, Salé
Referee: Mohamed Adel (Egypt)
27 August 2019
17:00

Senegal	1–1 (a.e.t.)	Burkina Faso
Badji 79'	Report	D. Ouattara 60' (pen.)
Penalties
Badji (penalty missed); N. Ndiaye (penalty scored); Camara (penalty scored); Dramé (penalty scored); Goudiaby (penalty scored)	4–5	(penalty scored) Ism. Ouedraogo; (penalty scored) Bathié; (penalty scored) Yoda; (penalty scored) Iss. Ouédraogo; (penalty scored) D. Ouattara

Sports Center of FAR, Salé
Referee: Juste Kokolo (Republic of the Congo)

=== Third place ===
29 August 2019
16:00

Mali	0–0 (a.e.t.)	Senegal
	Report
Penalties
	3–4

Stade Municipal, El Mansouria
Referee: Eugène Mdluli (South Africa)

=== Final ===
30 August 2019
17:00

Burkina Faso	2–0	Nigeria
D. Ouattara 24'; Ouedraogo 30'	Report

Stade Boubker Ammar, Salé
Referee: Jalal Jayed (Morocco)

== Goalscorers ==
There were 34 goals scored in 15 matches, for an average of 2.27 goals per match.

4 goals

- (Burkina Faso) Djibril Ouattara
- (Ghana) Tahiru Awudu

3 goals

- (Mali) Abdoulaye Kanou

2 goals

- (Burkina Faso) Elliass Dianda
- (Mali) Ibrahim Sangaré
- (Nigeria) Ahmad Ghali
- (Senegal) Youssouph Badji

1 goal

- (Burkina Faso) Kalifa Nikiema
- (Burkina Faso) Ibrahim Ouattara
- (Burkina Faso) Ismahila Ouedraogo
- (Burundi) Cédric Mavugo
- (Mali) Moussa Diarra
- (Mali) Souleymane Dramé
- (Morocco) Mohssine Abba
- (Morocco) Ismail Moutaraji
- (Nigeria) Chinonso Emeka
- (Nigeria) Abubakar Ibrahim
- (Nigeria) Yira Sor
- (Senegal) Ibrahima Dramé
- (Senegal) Baye War
- (South Africa) Ofentse Mashiane

1 own goal

- (South Africa) Sphiwe Nkabinde (against Burkina Faso)

== See also ==
- Football at the 2019 African Games – Women's tournament
