= 2016 UNAF U-17 Tournament =

Tournament details
- Country: Morocco
- Dates: 28 May – 4 June
- Teams: 6

Final positions
- Champions: Burkina Faso (2nd title)
- Runners-up: Tunisia
- Third place: Algeria
- Fourth place: Egypt

Tournament statistics
- Matches played: 9
- Goals scored: 23 (2.56 per match)

The 2016 UNAF U-17 Tournament was the 11th edition of the UNAF U-17 Tournament. The tournament took place in Rabat, Morocco between 28 May to 4 June 2016.

== Participants ==
- Morocco (hosts)
- Algeria
- Egypt
- Libya
- Tunisia
- Burkina Faso (invited)

== Venue ==
- Maamora sports centre, Salé

== Group stage ==
All times are local UTC+1.

=== Group A ===
Team	Pld	W	D	L	GF	GA	GD	Pts
Burkina Faso	2	1	1	0	1	0	+1	4
Algeria	2	0	2	0	2	2	0	2
Morocco	2	0	1	1	2	3	-1	1

28 May 2016
16:00

Morocco	0 – 1	Burkina Faso
		Ouedraogo 85'

Maamora sports centre, Salé
Referee: Ahmed Chelmani (Libya)
30 May 2016

Algeria	0 – 0	Burkina Faso

Maamora sports centre, Salé
Referee: Mourad Ben Hamza (Tunisia)
1 June 2016
18:00

Morocco	2 – 2	Algeria
Mourid 28'; Achouchats 69'		Idir 57'; Kerroum 88'

Maamora sports centre, Salé
Referee: Mahmoud Bassiouni (Egypt)

=== Group B ===
Team	Pld	W	D	L	GF	GA	GD	Pts
Tunisia	2	1	1	0	5	3	+2	4
Egypt	2	0	2	0	2	2	0	2
Libya	2	0	1	1	1	3	-2	1

28 May 2016
16:00

Tunisia	2 – 2	Egypt
Nasser 48'; Touati 75'		Abdelghani 31'; Mahmood 77'

Maamora sports centre, Salé
Referee: Mohamed Nhayeh (Morocco)
30 May 2016

Libya	1 – 3	Tunisia
Al-Jabali 22'		Ayad 9'; Saidi 33'; Hadj Mahmoud 78'

Maamora sports centre, Salé
Referee: Mahmoud Bassiouni (Egypt)
1 June 2016
16:00

Egypt	0 – 0	Libya

Maamora sports centre, Salé
Referee: Taoufik Kourar (Morocco)

== Final stage ==
4 June 2016
11:00

Egypt	1 – 2	Burkina Faso
Abdelghani 17'		Zoungrana 41', 44'

Maamora sports centre, Salé
Referee: Ahmed Chelmani (Libya)
4 June 2016
16:00

Tunisia	0 – 0	Algeria

Maamora sports centre, Salé
Referee: Taoufik Kourar (Morocco)
4 June 2016
18:00

Morocco	5 – 2	Libya
Abessi 27'; Ait Ourkhane 32', 69', 75'; Loufissi 59'

Maamora sports centre, Salé
Referee: Mourad Ben Hamza (Tunisia)

== Champions ==
2016 UNAF U-17 Tournament Winners

Burkina Faso
2nd Title
