= 2018 UNAF U-17 Tournament (Morocco) =

Tournament details
- Country: Morocco
- Dates: 20–27 December
- Teams: 6

Final positions
- Champions: Senegal (1st title)
- Runners-up: Morocco
- Third place: Tunisia
- Fourth place: Algeria

Tournament statistics
- Matches played: 9
- Goals scored: 23 (2.56 per match)

The 2018 UNAF U-17 Tournament was the 14th edition of the UNAF U-17 Tournament. The tournament took place in Marrakesh, Morocco between 20 and 27 December 2018.

== Participants ==
- Algeria
- Libya
- Mauritania (invited)
- Morocco (hosts)
- Tunisia
- Senegal (invited)
- Egypt (withdrew)

== Venues ==
- Annexe du Grand Stade de Marrakech, Marrakesh
- Stade de Marrakech, Marrakesh

== Match officials ==
Referees

- Hicham Temsamani (Morocco)
- Amine Sekhraoui (Algeria)
- Zidane Agrane (Libya)
- Amir Loussif (Tunisia)
- Mahmoud Nagy Mosa (Egypt)

Assistant Referees

- Abd Essamad Abertoun (Morocco)
- Badr Farhan (Morocco)
- Haithem Bouima (Algeria)
- Mohamed Amine Araf (Algeria)
- Magdi Kamel (Libya)
- Mounji Abou Chkioua (Libya)
- Jamel Dorai (Tunisia)
- Ahmed Dhouioui (Tunisia)
- Mohammed Mahmoud Lotfy (Egypt)
- Mahmoud Said (Egypt)

== Group stage ==
All times are local UTC+1.

=== Group A ===
Team	Pld	W	D	L	GF	GA	GD	Pts
Senegal	2	2	0	0	3	0	+3	6
Algeria	2	1	0	1	1	2	−1	3
Libya	2	0	0	2	0	2	−2	0

20 December 2018
--:--

Senegal	1–0	Libya

Annexe du Grand Stade de Marrakech, Marrakesh
Referee: Amine Sekhraoui (Algeria)

22 December 2018
--:--

Libya	0–1	Algeria
		Abdeljalil Mancer

Annexe du Grand Stade de Marrakech, Marrakesh
Referee: Amir Loussif (Tunisia)

24 December 2018
--:--

Senegal	2–0	Algeria
Omar Diouf 4'; Andisa Boy 50'

Annexe du Grand Stade de Marrakech, Marrakesh
Referee: Hicham Temsamani (Morocco)

=== Group B ===
Team	Pld	W	D	L	GF	GA	GD	Pts
Morocco	2	2	0	0	10	1	+9	6
Tunisia	2	1	0	1	3	4	−1	3
Mauritania	2	0	0	2	0	8	−8	0

20 December 2018
--:--

Morocco	4–1	Tunisia
Haitam Abaida 22'; Bilal Ouacharaf 44'; Fayçal Boujemaoui 70', 80'		Nassim Kheter 45'

Annexe du Grand Stade de Marrakech, Marrakesh
Referee: Mahmoud Nagy Mosa (Egypt)

22 December 2018
--:--

Tunisia	2–0	Mauritania

Annexe du Grand Stade de Marrakech, Marrakesh
Referee: Hicham Temsamani (Morocco)

24 December 2018
--:--

Morocco	6–0	Mauritania
Bilal Ouacharaf 41'; Dawoud Gueye-own goal 50'; Haitam Abaida 55'; Aoub Mouloua 71', 76'; Faissel Boujemaoui 90'

Annexe du Grand Stade de Marrakech, Marrakesh
Referee: Zidane Agrane (Libya)

== Knockout stage ==
=== Fifth-Place ===
27 December 2018

Libya	1–0	Mauritania
Abdul Rahman Al-Shafer 67'

Annexe du Grand Stade de Marrakech, Marrakesh
Referee: Amine Sekhraoui (Algeria)

=== Third-Place ===
27 December 2018

Tunisia	2–1	Algeria
Hamdi Obeidi 9'; Ryan Hamrouni 83'		Adel Belkacem Bouzida 75'

Annexe du Grand Stade de Marrakech, Marrakesh
Referee: Mahmoud Nagy Mosa (Egypt)

=== Final ===
27 December 2018

Morocco	1–1	Senegal
Faissal Boujemaoui 38'		Ibrahima Cissoko 91'
Penalties
	4-5

Stade de Marrakech, Marrakesh
Referee: Amir Loussif (Tunisia)

== Champions ==
2009 UNAF U-17 Tournament Winners

Senegal
1st Title
