= 2022 UNAF U-17 Tournament =

Tournament details
- Host country: Algeria
- Dates: 8–14 November 2022
- Teams: 4
- Venues: 2

Final positions
- Champions: Morocco (4th title)
- Runners-up: Egypt
- Third place: Libya

Tournament statistics
- Matches played: 6
- Goals scored: 18 (3 per match)
- Top scorer(s): (Egypt) Ayman Abdel-Aziz (Morocco) Abdelhamid Maali (Tunisia) Nacim Dendani (2 goals each)

The 2022 UNAF U-17 Tournament was the 17th edition of the UNAF U-17 Tournament. The tournament took place in Algeria between 8 to 14 November 2022. This tournament served as a qualification event for the Africa U-17 Cup of Nations. The champions qualified for the 2023 Africa U-17 Cup of Nations.

== Participants ==
Algeria withdrew from the tournament. The team qualified automatically for the 2023 Africa U-17 Cup of Nations as hosts of the tournament.

- Algeria (hosts & withdrew)
- Egypt
- Libya
- Morocco
- Tunisia

== Venues ==
Cities	Venues	Capacity
Algiers	Stade du 5 Juillet	64,000
Rouïba, Algiers	Salem Mabrouki Stadium	12,000

== Match officials ==
Below the list of the referees:

Referees

- Lahlou Benbraham (Algeria)
- Youcef Gamouh (Algeria)
- Mahmoud Nagy (Egypt)
- Mohamed Agha (Libya)
- Mustapha Kachaf (Morocco)
- Amir Loucif (Tunisia)
- Abdoul Karim Twagirumukiza (Rwanda)

Assistant Referees

- Adel Abane (Algeria)
- Mohamed Serradj (Algeria)
- Ahmed Tawfik Taleb (Egypt)
- Youssef El Bissati (Egypt)
- Basem Saif El Nasr (Libya)
- Ibrahim Boukouz (Libya)
- Mustapha Akerkad (Morocco)
- Abdessamad Abertoun (Morocco)
- Mohamed Bakir (Tunisia)
- Faouzi Jridi (Tunisia)

== Tournament ==
Pos	Team	Pld	W	D	L	GF	GA	GD	Pts	Qualification
1	Morocco	3	3	0	0	5	1	+4	9	2023 Africa U-17 Cup of Nations
2	Egypt	3	1	0	2	5	5	0	3	
3	Libya	3	1	0	2	4	5	−1	3	
4	Tunisia	3	1	0	2	4	7	−3	3	

Source: UNAF
Rules for classification: 1) Points; 2) Goal difference; 3) Goals scored

All times are local, WAT/CET (UTC+1).

8 November 2022
15:00

Tunisia	0–2	Morocco
	Report	Maali 56' (pen.); Bakhti 86'

Stade du 5 Juillet, Algiers
Referee: Abdoul Karim Twagiramukiza (Rwanda)
8 November 2022
18:15

Libya	2–1	Egypt
Al Mesmari 37'; Al Zakouzi 58'	Report	Mohamed 45+1' (pen.)

Stade du 5 Juillet, Algiers
Referee: Lahlou Benbraham (Algeria)

11 November 2022
15:00

Egypt	3–1	Tunisia
Abdel-Aziz 15'; Moawad 54'; Abdelkarim 90+1'	Report	Al Gharbi 81'

Stade du 5 Juillet, Algiers
Referee: Mohamed Agha (Libya)
11 November 2022
18:15

Morocco	1–0	Libya
Ashtar 24'	Report

Stade du 5 Juillet, Algiers
Referee: Youcef Gamouh (Algeria)

14 November 2022
15:00

Tunisia	3–2	Libya
Dendani 54' (pen.), 80'; Amdouni 87'	Report	Al Mabrouk 4' (pen.); Kerwash 84'

Stade du 5 Juillet, Algiers
Referee: Lahlou Benbraham (Algeria)
14 November 2022
15:00

Egypt	1–2	Morocco
Abdel-Aziz 58'	Report	Maali 7'; Nair 45'

Salem Mabrouki Stadium, Algiers
Referee: Abdoul Karim Twagirumukiza (Rwanda)

== Qualified teams for Africa U-17 Cup of Nations ==
The following team qualified for the 2023 Africa U-17 Cup of Nations.

Team	Qualified on	Previous appearances in Africa U-17 Cup of Nations^{1}
Morocco	14 November 2022	2 (2013, 2019)

^{1} Bold indicates champion for that year. Italic indicates host for that year.

== Statistics ==
=== Goalscorers ===
There were 18 goals scored in 6 matches, for an average of 3 goals per match.

2 goals

- (Egypt) Ayman Abdel-Aziz
- (Morocco) Abdelhamid Maali
- (Tunisia) Nacim Dendani

1 goal

- (Egypt) Hossam Abdelkarim
- (Egypt) Omar Moawad
- (Egypt) Omar Mohamed
- (Libya) Sanad Kerwash
- (Libya) Abdel Moamen Al Mabrouk
- (Libya) Ahmed Al Mesmari
- (Libya) Marwan Al Zakouzi
- (Morocco) Adam Ashtar
- (Morocco) Ismail Bakhti
- (Morocco) Aiman Nair
- (Tunisia) Anas Amdouni
- (Tunisia) Moncef Al Gharbi
