= 2022 UNAF U-17 Tournament (March) =

Tournament details
- Country: Algeria
- Dates: 14–24 March 2022
- Teams: 5

Final positions
- Champions: Egypt (2nd title)
- Runners-up: Morocco
- Third place: Tunisia

Tournament statistics
- Matches played: 10
- Goals scored: 22 (2.2 per match)
- Top goal scorer: Multi players

The 2022 UNAF U-17 Tournament is the 16th edition of the UNAF U-17 Tournament. The tournament took place in Algeria between 14 and 24 March 2022.

== Participants ==
- Algeria (hosts)
- Libya
- Tunisia
- Egypt
- Morocco

== Venues ==
Cities	Venues	Capacity
Dar El Beïda	Omar Benrabah Stadium	11,000

== Match officials ==
Below the list of the referees:

Referees

- Bilal Soltan (Algeria)
- (Ms) Aicha Chehih (Algeria)
- Mostafa Ibrahim Mostafa El-Shahdy (Egypt)
- (Ms) Marwa Moawad El-Maghrabi (Egypt)
- (Ms) Asma Rabee Nasar (Egypt)
- Ashraf Abdel-Sadeq (Libya)
- Abdel-Hameed Naseb Abdel-Razak (Libya)
- Tarek El-Motmani (Morocco)
- (Ms) Zoulikha Hermas (Morocco)
- Badis Ben Salah (Tunisia)
- (Ms) Afaf Miladi (Tunisia)

Assistant Referees

- Abdelkader Sifa (Algeria)
- Salam Raja Ahmed (Algeria)
- (Ms) Sara Belmadi (Algeria)
- Islam Mohamed Abu El-Ata (Egypt)
- Mohamed Atef El-Zenary (Egypt)
- Ahmed Mohamed Aouina (Libya)
- Mohamed Hadhloul (Libya)
- Ismael Faraj M'hammed (Libya)
- Farid Jouili (Morocco)
- Moustafa El-Ouazzani (Morocco)
- (Ms) Souad El-Mokhtari (Morocco)
- Mohamed Amine Boujemaa (Tunisia)
- Tawfik Bouzenif (Tunisia)
- (Ms) Aya Khadri (Tunisia)

== Tournament ==
Pos	Team	Pld	W	D	L	GF	GA	GD	Pts	Qualification
1	Egypt	4	4	0	0	9	2	+7	12	Champions
2	Morocco	4	2	1	1	4	1	+3	7	
3	Tunisia	4	2	0	2	7	6	+1	6	
4	Algeria (H)	4	1	1	2	1	4	−3	4	
5	Libya	4	0	0	4	1	9	−8	0	

Updated to match(es) played on 27 December 2020. Source: UNAF
Rules for classification: 1) Points; 2) Goal difference; 3) Goals scored
(H) Hosts

All times are local, CET (UTC+1).

14 March 2022
11:00

Algeria	1–0	Libya
Djibril Bahlouli 39'	Report

Omar Benrabah Stadium, Dar El Beïda
14 March 2022
15:00

Tunisia	2–3	Egypt
Wissam Chouali 46', 58'	Report	Marouan Abdel-Fattah 23'; Omar Moawad 28' (pen.); Mohsen Mahrus 70'

Omar Benrabah Stadium, Dar El Beïda

16 March 2022
11:00

Egypt	4–0	Libya
Mohsen Mahrus 29'; Ibrahim Abdel-Karim 37', 38'; Mohamed Abdel-Adhim 62'	Report

Omar Benrabah Stadium, Dar El Beïda
16 March 2022
15:00

Morocco	0–0	Algeria
	Report

Omar Benrabah Stadium, Dar El Beïda

18 March 2022
11:00

Egypt	1–0	Morocco
Omar Moawad 75'	Report

Omar Benrabah Stadium, Dar El Beïda
18 March 2022
15:00

Libya	1–2	Tunisia
Shaib Twir 20' (pen.)	Report	Rayane Rbia 15'; Akram Tboubi 48'

Omar Benrabah Stadium, Dar El Beïda

20 March 2022
11:00

Tunisia	0–2	Morocco
	Report	Abdelhamid Maali 41'; Rayane Biad 52'

Omar Benrabah Stadium, Dar El Beïda
20 March 2022
15:00

Algeria	0–1	Egypt
	Report	Ibrahim Adel 22'

Omar Benrabah Stadium, Dar El Beïda

22 March 2022
11:00

Morocco	2–0	Libya
Seif Eddin Chelaghmou 30'; Aymen El Neir 68'	Report

Omar Benrabah Stadium, Dar El Beïda
22 March 2022
15:00

Algeria	0–3	Tunisia
	Report	Yacine Ben Abdellah 26'; Rayane Rbia 28' (pen.); Yacine Boukhris 59'

Omar Benrabah Stadium, Dar El Beïda

== Statistics ==
=== Goalscorers ===
There were 22 goals scored in 10 matches, for an average of 2.2 goals per match.

2 goals

- (Egypt) Ibrahim Abdel-Karim
- (Egypt) Mohsen Mahrus
- (Tunisia) Wissam Chouali
- (Tunisia) Rayane Rbia
- (Egypt) Omar Moawad

1 goal

- (Algeria) Djibril Bahlouli
- (Egypt) Mohamed Abdel-Adhim
- (Egypt) Marouan Abdel-Fattah
- (Egypt) Omar Abdel-Wahid
- (Egypt) Ibrahim Adel
- (Egypt) Mohsen Mahrus
- (Libya) Shaib Twir
- (Morocco) Rayane Biad
- (Morocco) Seif Eddin Chelaghmou
- (Morocco) Aymen El Neir
- (Morocco) Abdelhamid Maali
- (Tunisia) Yacine Ben Abdellah
- (Tunisia) Yacine Boukhris
- (Tunisia) Akram Tboubi

== Broadcasting ==
Territory	Rights holder(s)	Ref.
Algeria	Algeria 6 (Youth)	
