= Nacim Dendani =

Tunisian footballer (born 2006)

Personal information
- Date of birth: 30 April 2006 (age 20)
- Place of birth: Ajaccio, France
- Height: 1.78 m (5 ft 10 in)
- Position: Winger

Team information
- Current team: RFC Liège

Youth career
- 2011–2012: ASC Les Cannes Aiacciu
- 2015–2016: Toulon
- 2016–2019: FC Seynois
- 2020–2021: Gardia Club
- 2021–2026: Monaco

Senior career*
| Years | Team | Apps | (Gls) |
| 2026– | RFC Liège | 0 | (0) |

International career^{‡}
| 2022 | Tunisia U17 | 3 | (2) |
| 2025– | Tunisia U20 | 3 | (0) |
| 2025– | Tunisia U23 | 1 | (0) |
| 2025– | Tunisia | 1 | (0) |
- * Club domestic league appearances and goals as of 23:55, 21 December 2025 (UTC) ‡ National team caps and goals as of 23:55, 21 December 2025 (UTC)

Nacim Dendani (born 30 April 2006) is a professional footballer who plays as a winger for Belgian Challenger Pro League club RFC Liège. Born in France, he plays for the Tunisia national team.

== Club career ==
Dendani is a product of the youth academies of the French clubs ASC Les Cannes Aiacciu, Toulon, FC Seynois, Gardia Club and Monaco. On 18 June 2024, he signed his first professional contract with Monaco.

On 12 July 2026, Dendani signed with Belgian second-tier Challenger Pro League club RFC Liège for two years, with an optional third year.

== International career ==
Born in France, Dendani is of Tunisian descent and holds dual French and Tunisian citizenship. He was called up to the Tunisia U20s for the 2025 U-20 Africa Cup of Nations. On 9 September 2025, he debuted with the Tunisia national team in a 3–0 friendly loss to Egypt. He made the senior Tunisia national team squad for the 2025 FIFA Arab Cup.

== Honours ==
Individual

- 2022 UNAF U-17 Tournament top scorer (2 goals)
