= 2026 UNAF U-17 Tournament =

Tournament details
- Country: Libya
- Dates: 24 March–5 April
- Teams: 5

Final positions
- Champions: Morocco (5th title)
- Runners-up: Algeria
- Third place: Egypt

Tournament statistics
- Matches played: 10
- Goals scored: 28 (2.8 per match)
- Top goal scorer(s): (Morocco) Rami Lougmani (Morocco) Adam Boughazir (3 goals each)

Awards
- Best player: (Morocco) Ibrahim Rabbaj

The 2026 UNAF U-17 Tournament officially named TotalEnergies U-17 Africa Cup of Nations - UNAF Qualifiers 2026 was the 20th edition of the UNAF U-17 Tournament and was held in Benghazi, Libya between 24 March and 5 April 2026. The tournament also served as the qualifiers for the 2026 U-17 Africa Cup of Nations.

== Participants ==
The five participating teams were:

- Algeria
- Egypt
- Morocco
- Libya
- Tunisia

== Tournament ==
Pos	Team	Pld	W	D	L	GF	GA	GD	Pts	Qualification
1	Morocco	4	4	0	0	10	2	+8	12	Final tournament as the host nation
2	Algeria	4	2	1	1	7	5	+2	7	Final tournament
3	Egypt	4	2	0	2	4	4	0	6	Final tournament
4	Tunisia	4	1	1	2	3	5	−2	4	Final tournament
5	Libya (H)	4	0	0	4	4	12	−8	0	

Source: UNAF
Rules for classification: 1) Points; 2) Goal difference; 3) Goals scored
(H) Hosts

=== Matches ===
24 March 2026
14:00

Morocco	2–0	Tunisia
Zinbi 19'; Lougmani 90+3'	Report (UNAF)

Benghazi International Stadium, Benghazi
Referee: Mahmoud Wafa (Egypt)
24 March 2026
17:00

Libya	1–5	Algeria
Alrifi 54'	Report (UNAF)	Valmy 29', 71'; Refsi 31'; Abed 57'; Meguenni 66'

Benghazi International Stadium, Benghazi
Referee: Abdellaoui Fredj (Tunisia)

27 March 2026
14:00

Tunisia	0–1	Egypt
	Report (UNAF)	Daniel Tamer 15' (pen.)

Benina Martyrs Stadium, Benghazi
Referee: Hicham Temsamani (Morocco)
27 March 2026
16:00

Algeria	0–3	Morocco
	Report (UNAF)	Noubli 12' (o.g.); Lougmani 43'; Boughazir 90+2'

Al Ittihad Al Asskary Stadium, Benghazi
Referee: Mohamed Ali Moussa (Niger)

30 March 2026
14:00

Libya	1–2	Tunisia
Abu Izwaydah 11'	Report (UNAF)	Ben Hassine 18'; Thabti 53' (pen.)

Benina Martyrs Stadium, Benghazi
Referee: Mohamed Rafiq Aouina (Algeria)
30 March 2026
16:00

Egypt	1–2	Morocco
Adel Alaa 41'	Report (UNAF)	Lougmani 24'; El Boujjoufi 84'

Al Ittihad Al Asskary Stadium, Benghazi
Referee: Mohamed Agha (Libya)

2 April 2026
14:00

Libya	1–2	Egypt
Kaban 35'		Ahmed Safwat 48'; Mohamed Gamal 67' (pen.)

Benina Martyrs Stadium, Benghazi
Referee: Hicham Temsamani (Morocco)
2 April 2026
14:00

Tunisia	1–1	Algeria
Thabti 36'		Abed 20'

Al Ittihad Al Asskary Stadium, Benghazi
Referee: Mohamed Ali Moussa (Niger)

5 April 2026
14:00

Algeria	1–0	Egypt
Zaoui 47'

Benghazi International Stadium, Benghazi
Referee: Abdellaoui Fredj (Tunisia)
5 April 2026
14:00

Morocco	3–1	Libya
El Boujjoufi 2', 55'; Boughazir 44'		Jroud 10'

Benina Martyrs Stadium, Benghazi
Referee: Mahmoud Wafa (Egypt)

== Statistics ==
=== Goalscorers ===
There have been 18 goals scored in 6 matches, for an average of 3 goals per match (as of 30 March 2026).

3 goals

- (Morocco) Rami Lougmani
- (Morocco) Adam Boughazir

2 goals

- (Morocco) Adnan El Boujjoufi
- (Algeria) Mouhammad Valmy

1 goal

- (Morocco) Mohamed Habib Zinbi
- (Algeria) Yacine Abed
- (Algeria) Mohamed Yacin Meguenni
- (Algeria) Illian Refsi
- (Egypt) Adel Alaa
- (Egypt) Daniel Tamer
- (Libya) Anas Al-Arfi
- (Libya) Abdulrahman Abu Izwaydah
- (Tunisia) Othmen Ben Hassine
- (Tunisia) Moncef Thabti

1 own goal

- (Algeria) Fethi Noubli

== Qualified teams for U-17 Africa Cup of Nations ==
The following four teams from UNAF qualified for the 2026 U-17 Africa Cup of Nations. Morocco qualified automatically as hosts.

Team	Qualified on	Previous appearances in U-17 Africa Cup of Nations^{1}
Morocco	16 December 2024	4 (2013, 2019, 2023, **2025**)
Egypt	5 April 2026	4 (**1997**, 2003, 2011, 2025)
Algeria	5 April 2026	2 (2009, 2023)
Tunisia	5 April 2026	4 (1995, 2007, 2013, 2025)

^{1} Bold indicates champion for that year. Italic indicates host for that year.
