= 2008 UNAF U-17 Tournament (Algeria) =

Tournament details
- Host country: Algeria
- Dates: 12–22 December
- Teams: 5

Final positions
- Champions: Algeria
- Runners-up: Libya

Tournament statistics
- Matches played: 20
- Goals scored: 20 (1 per match)

The 2008 UNAF U-17 Tournament (Algeria) was the 4th edition of the UNAF U-17 Tournament took place in Algeria between 12 and 22 December 2008.

== Participants ==
- Tunisia
- Algeria
- Morocco
- Libya
- Guinea (invited)

== Tournament ==
Team	Pld	W	D	L	GF	GA	GD	Pts
Algeria	4	2	2	0	6	2	+4	8
Libya	4	2	1	1	3	4	-1	7
Guinea	4	1	3	0	6	3	+3	6
Tunisia	4	1	1	2	3	4	-1	4
Morocco	4	0	1	3	2	7	-5	1

12 December 2008

Algeria	3 - 0	Libya
Cheheima (?); Toulait (?); Ziane (?)	Report

Zéralda Stadium, Algiers

12 December 2008

Tunisia	2 - 1	Morocco
	Report

Omar Hamadi Stadium, Algiers

15 December 2008

Algeria	1 - 1	Guinea
Ziane 5'	Report	56'

Zéralda Stadium, Algiers

15 December 2008

Libya	1 - 0	Tunisia
	Report

Omar Hamadi Stadium, Algiers

17 December 2008

Algeria	1 - 1	Morocco
	Report

Zéralda Stadium, Algiers

17 December 2008

Libya	1 - 1	Guinea
	Report

Omar Hamadi Stadium, Algiers

19 December 2008

Libya	1 - 0	Morocco

Zéralda Stadium, Algiers

19 December 2008

Tunisia	1 - 1	Guinea

Omar Hamadi Stadium, Algiers

22 December 2008

Morocco	0 - 3	Guinea

Omar Hamadi Stadium, Bologhine

22 December 2008

Algeria	1 - 0	Tunisia
Bezzaz 5'	Report

Zéralda Stadium, Algiers

== Champions ==
2008 UNAF U-17 Tournament Winners

Algeria
2nd Title
