= Algeria national under-17 football team =

National under-17 association football team representing Algeria

Algeria U-17
- Nickname(s): الأفنــاك (Fennec foxes)
- Association: Algerian Football Federation
- Confederation: CAF (Africa)
- Head coach: Amine Ghimouz
- Home stadium: Stade 5 Juillet
- FIFA code: ALG
First colours	Second colours

Africa U-17 Cup of Nations
- Appearances: 3 (first in 2009)
- Best result: Runners-up (2009)

UNAF U-17 Tournament
- Appearances: 15 (first in 2006)
- Best result: Champions (2006, Dec 2008, Mar 2012, 2021)

FIFA U-17 World Cup
- Appearances: 2 (first in 2009)
- Best result: Round 1 (2009)

The Algeria national under-17 football team (Arabic: منتخب الجزائر لكرة القدم تحت 17 سنة) is the national representative for Algeria in international under-17 football competitions, and is controlled by the Algerian Football Federation. The team competes in the Africa U-17 Cup of Nations, UNAF U-17 Tournament, and the FIFA U-17 World Cup, which is held every two years. The under-17 team also participates in local and international friendly tournaments. In March 2025 Amine Ghimouz was appointed head coach.

== Honours ==
- CAF U-17 Championship:

Runners-up (1): 2009

- UNAF U-17 Tournament:

Winners (5): 2006, Dec 2008, Mar 2012, 2021, Nov 2026
Runners-up (5): Mar 2008, 2011, Aug 2018, Apr 2024, Apr 2026
Third place (2): 2016, 2017

- Arab Cup U-17

Winners (1): 2022

- UNAF U-16 Tournament

Runners-up (2): 2009, 2026

== Tournament Records ==
=== FIFA U-16 and U-17 World Cup record ===
FIFA U-16 and U-17 World Cup
Appearances: 2
Year	Round	Position	Pld	W	D	L	GF	GA
(China) 1985	Did not qualify							
(Canada) 1987	Did not qualify							
(Scotland) 1989	Did not qualify							
(Italy) 1991	Did not qualify							
(Japan) 1993	Did not qualify							
(Ecuador) 1995	Did not qualify							
(Egypt) 1997	Did not qualify							
(New Zealand) 1999	Did not qualify							
(Trinidad and Tobago) 2001	Withdrew							
(Finland) 2003	Did not qualify							
(Peru) 2005	Did not enter							
(South Korea) 2007	Did not qualify							
(Nigeria) 2009	Group stage	23rd	3	0	0	3	0	5
(Mexico) 2011	Did not qualify							
(United Arab Emirates) 2013	Did not qualify							
(Chile) 2015	Did not enter							
(India) 2017	Did not qualify							
(Brazil) 2019	Did not qualify							
(Indonesia) 2023	Did not qualify							
(Qatar) 2025	Did not qualify							
(Qatar) 2026	In progress	TBD	1	0	0	1	2	4
(Qatar) 2027	To be determined							
Total:2/21	Group stage	23rd	4	0	0	4	2	9

=== U-17 Africa Cup of Nations record ===
U-17 Africa Cup of Nations
Appearances: 3
Year	Round	Position	Pld	W	D	L	GF	GA
(Mali) 1995	did not qualify							
(Botswana) 1997	did not qualify							
(Guinea) 1999	did not qualify							
(Seychelles) 2001	Withdrew							
(Eswatini) 2003	did not qualify							
(The Gambia) 2005	did not enter							
(Togo) 2007	did not qualify							
(Algeria) 2009	Runners-up	2nd	5	3	0	2	4	5
(Rwanda) 2011	did not qualify							
(Morocco) 2013	did not qualify							
(Niger) 2015	did not enter							
(Gabon) 2017	did not qualify							
(Tanzania) 2019	did not qualify							
(Algeria) 2023	Quarter-finals	6th	4	1	1	2	3	7
(Morocco) 2025	did not qualify							
(Morocco) 2026	Quarter-finals	8th	4	1	2	1	8	7
(Morocco) 2027	To be determined							
Total	Runners-up	3/16	13	5	3	5	15	19

=== UNAF U-17 Tournament record ===
UNAF U-17 Tournament record
Year	Round	Position	Pld	W	D	L	GF	GA
(Algeria) 2006	Champions	1st	2	0	2	0	0	0
(Morocco) 2007	Fourth place	4th	3	0	0	3	0	5
(Tunisia) Mar 2008	Runners-up	2nd	3	2	1	0	4	0
(Algeria) Dec 2008	Champions	1st	4	2	2	0	6	2
(Tunisia) 2009	Group Stage	6th	2	0	1	1	1	5
(Tunisia) 2010	Group Stage	5th	3	1	1	1	3	1
(Morocco) 2011	Runners-up	2nd	2	0	1	1	0	2
(Tunisia) Mar 2012	Champions	1st	2	1	1	0	2	0
(Morocco) Dec 2012	Did not enter							
(Morocco) 2014	Did not enter							
(Morocco) 2016	Third place	3rd	3	0	3	0	2	2
(Morocco) 2017	Third place	3rd	3	2	0	1	3	5
(Tunisia) Aug 2018	Runners-up	2nd	3	1	1	1	5	6
(Morocco) Dec 2018	Fourth place	4th	3	1	0	2	2	4
(Algeria) 2021	Champions	1st	2	1	1	0	4	3
(Algeria) Mar 2022	Fourth place	4th	4	1	1	2	1	4
(Algeria) Nov 2022	Withdrew							
(Algeria) Apr 2024	Runners-up	2nd	4	1	3	0	5	3
(Morocco) Nov 2024	Fourth place	4th	4	1	1	2	5	6
(Libya) Apr 2026	Runners-up	2nd	4	2	1	1	7	5
(Tunisia) Nov 2026	Champions	1st	3	2	0	1	3	4
Total	5 Titles	19/22	54	18	20	16	53	57

=== CAF U-16 and U-17 World Cup Qualifiers record ===
CAF U-16 and U-17 World Cup Qualifiers
Appearances: 5
Year	Round	Position	Pld	W	D	L	GF	GA
1985	First Round		2	0	1	1	1	3
1987	Third Round		4	1	2	1	2	2
1989	Second Round		2	0	0	2	0	6
1991	Second Round		2	0	1	1	0	1
1993	Final Round		4	1	1	2	2	6
Total	Final Round	5/5	14	2	5	7	5	18

=== Arab Cup U-17 record ===
Arab Cup U-17
Appearances: 3
Year	Round	Position	Pld	W	D	L	GF	GA
(Saudi Arabia) 2011	Fourth place	4th	6	2	1	3	6	5
(Tunisia) 2012	Group stage	8th	2	0	0	2	0	5
(Qatar) 2014	did not participate							
(Morocco) 2021	Cancelled							
(Algeria) 2022	Winner	1st	6	3	3	0	12	2
Total	Winner	3/4	14	5	4	5	18	12

=== UNAF U-16 Tournament ===
UNAF U-16 Tournament record
Year	Round	Position	Pld	W	D*	L	GF	GA
(Morocco) 2009	Runners-up	2nd	2	0	2	0	1	1
(Morocco) 2015	Did not enter							
(Tunisia) 2026	Runners-up	2nd	3	1	1	1	4	5
Total	Runners-up	2/3	5	1	3	1	5	6

== Current squad ==
The following 24 players were named in the squad for the most recent fixtures in the 2026 UNAF U-17 Tournament.

No.	Pos.	Player	Date of birth (age)	Club
1	GK	Ivan Guemdani	6 October 2009 (age 17)	(French Football Federation) Marseille
16	GK	Nazim Benmedjdoub	1 January 2009 (age 17)	
5	DF	Yanis Messaoudi	17 February 2009 (age 17)	(Italian Football Federation) AC Milan
6	DF	Ali Sadji		(Algerian Football Federation) JS Kabylie
12	DF	Ilyes Mekkaoui	15 June 2009 (age 17)	(Royal Dutch Football Association) Volendam
15	DF	Noam Benramdane	1 February 2009 (age 17)	(French Football Federation) Montpellier
3	DF	Anas Belkanichi	16 April 2009 (age 17)	(French Football Federation) Toulouse
	MF	Ayoub Bouacida		(Algerian Football Federation) ES Sétif
2	MF	Ayoub Dahmas		(Algerian Football Federation) USM Alger
4	MF	Mahmoud Noubli (captain)	1 January 2009 (age 17)	(Algerian Football Federation) Paradou AC
7	MF	Yacine Abed	6 January 2010 (age 16)	(Algerian Football Federation) Paradou AC
11	MF	Khalil Touali		(Algerian Football Federation) Olympique Akbou
13	MF	Yasser Noureddine Bouhadjela		(Algerian Football Federation) Olympique Akbou
20	MF	Mohamed Yacin Meguenni	1 January 2010 (age 16)	(French Football Federation) Lyon
21	MF	Ilian Refsi	1 January 2009 (age 17)	(French Football Federation) Paris FC
22	MF	Abderrahmane Zaoui		(Algerian Football Federation) MC Mekhadma
23	MF	Nazim Mohamed Salah Benkaidia		(Algerian Football Federation) CS Constantine
24	MF	Tahar Mohamed Akbache		(Algerian Football Federation) USM Alger
18	MF	Ilyes Grini	3 August 2009 (age 17)	(French Football Federation) Lens
19	MF	Adam Benali	4 January 2009 (age 17)	(French Football Federation) Le Havre
25	MF	Djibril Merouani	24 March 2009 (age 17)	(French Football Federation) Lyon
9	FW	Mouhammad Valmy	29 November 2009 (age 16)	(French Football Federation) Rennes
8	FW	Walid Nechab	24 March 2009 (age 17)	(French Football Federation) Lyon
10	FW	Bilal Daaou	27 August 2009 (age 17)	(German Football Association) Eintracht Frankfurt

== See also ==
- Algeria national football team
- Algeria national under-23 football team
- Algeria national under-20 football team
- U-17 Africa Cup of Nations
