= 2021 UNAF U-17 Tournament =

Tournament details
- Country: Algeria
- Dates: 18–24 January 2021
- Teams: 3

Final positions
- Champions: Algeria (4th title)
- Runners-up: Tunisia
- Third place: Libya

Tournament statistics
- Matches played: 3
- Goals scored: 10 (3.33 per match)
- Top goal scorer: Multi players

The 2021 UNAF U-17 Tournament was the 15th edition of the UNAF U-17 Tournament. The tournament take place in Algeria between 18 and 24 January 2021. This tournament serves as a qualification event for the Africa U-17 Cup of Nations.

== Participants ==
Egypt and Morocco withdrew from the tournament. Morocco qualified automatically for the 2021 Africa U-17 Cup of Nations as hosts of the tournament.

- Algeria (hosts)
- Libya
- Tunisia
- Egypt (withdrew)
- Morocco (withdrew)

== Venues ==
Cities	Venues	Capacity
Algiers	Stade du 5 Juillet	64,000

== Match officials ==
Referees

- Ibrahim Nour El-Din (Egypt)
- Amin Mohamed Omar (Egypt)
- (Ms) Shahenda Saad El-Maghrabi (Egypt)
- Mustapha Kech Chaf (Morocco)
- Karim Sabry (Morocco)

Assistant Referees

- Ahmed Hossam Taha (Egypt)
- Hany Abdelfattah (Egypt)
- Yahya Nouali (Morocco)
- Abdessamad Abertoune (Morocco)

== Tournament ==
Pos	Team	Pld	W	D	L	GF	GA	GD	Pts	Qualification
1	Algeria (H)	2	1	1	0	4	3	+1	4	2021 Africa U-17 Cup of Nations
2	Tunisia	2	1	1	0	3	2	+1	4	
3	Libya	2	0	0	2	3	5	−2	0	

Updated to match(es) played on 27 December 2020. Source: UNAF
Rules for classification: 1) Points; 2) Goal difference; 3) Goals scored
(H) Hosts

=== Matches ===
All times are local, CET (UTC+1).

18 January 2021
14:30

Algeria	3–2	Libya
Anis Ouchaouche 37'; Mohamed Rafik Omar 49'; Joris Jebril Tabbouche 86'	Report	Abdulsamia Abdulnabi Samia 28'; Djibril Nottebaere 59' (o.g.)

Stade du 5 Juillet, Algiers
Attendance: 0
Referee: Ibrahim Nour El-Din (Egypt)

21 January 2021
14:30

Tunisia	2–1	Libya
Firas Mahdouani 55'; Mohamed Nasser Trabelsi 90+5'	Report	Abdulmuyasser Boushibah 78'

Stade du 5 Juillet, Algiers
Attendance: 0
Referee: Mustapha Kech Chaf (Morocco)

24 January 2021
14:30

Algeria	1–1	Tunisia
Edhy Yvan Zuliani 70'	Report	Youssef Senana 90'

Stade du 5 Juillet, Algiers
Attendance: 0
Referee: Amin Mohamed Omar (Egypt)

== Qualified teams for Africa U-17 Cup of Nations ==
The following four teams from CAF qualify for the 2021 Africa U-17 Cup of Nations.

Team	Qualified on	Previous appearances in Africa U-17 Cup of Nations^{1}
Algeria	24 January 2021	1 (2009)

^{1} Bold indicates champion for that year. Italic indicates host for that year.

== Statistics ==
=== Goalscorers ===
There were 10 goals scored in 3 matches, for an average of 3.33 goals per match.

1 goal

- (Algeria) Anis Ouchaouche
- (Algeria) Mohamed Rafik Omar
- (Algeria) Joris Jebril Tabbouche
- (Algeria) Edhy Yvan Zuliani
- (Libya) Abdulmuyasser Boushibah
- (Libya) Abdulsamia Abdulnabi Samia
- (Tunisia) Firas Mahdouani
- (Tunisia) Youssef Senana
- (Tunisia) Mohamed Nasser Trabelsi

1 own goal

- (Algeria) Djibril Nottebaere (against Libya)
