= Arab Cup U-17 =

- Founded: 2011
- Region: Arab World (UAFA)
- Teams: 10
- Current champions: Algeria (1st title)
- Most championships: Algeria; Iraq; Saudi Arabia; Tunisia (1 title each)
- 2022 Arab Cup U-17

The Arab Cup Under 17 (Arabic: كأس العرب للمنتخبات تحت 17 سنة) is an international football competition organised by the Union of Arab Football Associations, contested by the national teams under 17 in the Arab World. The first edition was in 2011.

== Results ==
Ed.	Year	Host	First place game			Third place game		
Ed.	Year	Host	(gold) Champion	Score	(silver) Runner-up	(bronze) Third place	Score	Fourth place
1	2011	Saudi Arabia	Saudi Arabia	4–3	Syria	Sudan	2–1	Algeria
2	2012	Tunisia	Tunisia	3–0	Iraq	Morocco	1–0	Yemen
3	2014	Qatar	Iraq	2–0	Saudi Arabia	Djibouti	3–3 (3–2 p)	Qatar
—	2021	Morocco	Cancelled due to the COVID-19 pandemic			Cancelled due to the COVID-19 pandemic		
4	2022	Algeria	Algeria	1–1 (4–2 p)	Morocco	Saudi Arabia and Yemen		

== Statistics ==
=== Summary ===
Team	Winners	Runners-up	Third place	Fourth place	Semi-finalist
Saudi Arabia	1 (2011)	1 (2014)	–	–	1 (2022)
Iraq	1 (2014)	1 (2012)	–	–	–
Algeria	1 (2022)	–	–	1 (2011)	–
Tunisia	1 (2012)	–	–	–	–
Morocco	–	1 (2022)	1 (2012)	–	–
Syria	–	1 (2011)	–	–	–
Djibouti	–	–	1 (2014)	–	–
Sudan	–	–	1 (2011)	–	–
Yemen	–	–	–	1 (2012)	1 (2022)
Qatar	–	–	–	1 (2014)	–

=== Participating nations ===
Team	(Saudi Arabia) 2011	(Tunisia) 2012	(Qatar) 2014	(Morocco) ~~2021~~	(Algeria) 2022	Years
Algeria	4th	GS		~~Q~~	1st	3
Bahrain				~~Q~~		0
Comoros					GS	1
Djibouti			3rd	~~Q~~		1
Egypt				~~Q~~	QF	1
Iraq	GS	2nd	1st	~~Q~~	QF	4
Kuwait	GS			~~Q~~		1
Lebanon				~~Q~~	GS	1
Libya		GS		~~Q~~	GS	2
Mauritania		GS	GS	~~Q~~	GS	3
Morocco	GS	3rd		~~Q~~	2nd	3
Oman		GS			GS	2
Palestine	GS		GS	~~Q~~	GS	3
Qatar			4th			2
Saudi Arabia	1st	GS	2nd	~~Q~~	SF	4
Somalia				~~Q~~		0
Sudan	3rd	GS	GS		QF	4
Syria	2nd				GS	2
Tunisia		1st		~~Q~~	QF	2
United Arab Emirates				~~Q~~	GS	1
Yemen		4th		~~Q~~	SF	2
Total	8	10	7	~~16~~	16	

- Red Border: Host nation.
- Blank: Did not enter.
- GS: Group Stage.

== See also ==
- FIFA Arab Cup
- Arab U-20 Championship
