= Tunisia national under-17 football team =

National under-17 association football team representing Tunisia

Tunisia U-17
- Nickname(s): نسور قرطاج (Eagles of Carthage)
- Association: Tunisian Football Federation
- Other affiliation: UAFA (Arab World)
- Confederation: CAF (Africa)
- Sub-confederation: UNAF (North Africa)
- Home stadium: Hammadi Agrebi Stadium
- FIFA code: TUN
First colours	Second colours	Third colours

First international
- Tunisia 0–1 Algeria (Tunis, Tunisia; 24 August 1986)

Biggest win
- Tunisia 6–0 Fiji (Al Rayyan, Qatar; 3 November 2025)

Biggest defeat
- Tunisia 0–7 Ghana (Mali; 20 May 1995)

FIFA U-17 World Cup
- Appearances: 4 (first in 1993)
- Best result: Round of 16 (2007, 2013)

U-17 Africa Cup of Nations
- Appearances: 5 (first in 1995)
- Best result: Third Place (2013)

Arab Cup U-17
- Appearances: 2 (first in 2012)
- Best result: Champions (2012)

UNAF U-17 Tournament
- Appearances: 21 (first in 2006)
- Best result: Champions (Mar 2008, Dec 2012, 2017)

The Tunisia national under-17 football team has represented Tunisia in men's international association football for players aged 17 or under. The team is administered by the Tunisian Football Federation (TFF), which governs football in Tunisia. On a continental level, the team competes under the Confederation of African Football (CAF), which governs associate football in Africa, and is also affiliated with FIFA for global competitions. Additionally, the team is a member of the Union of North African Football (UNAF) and the Union of Arab Football Associations (UAFA). The team is colloquially known as Eagles of Carthage by fans and the media, with the bald eagle serving as its symbol. Their home kit is primarily white and their away kit is red, which is a reference to the national flag of the country. Abderrazak Hedider is the current head coach.

The Tunisian national team qualified for the FIFA U-17 World Cup four times in 1993, 2007, 2013 and 2025, reaching the round of 16 in 2007 and 2013. The team also qualified for the U-17 Africa Cup of Nations five times in 1995, 2007, 2013, 2025 and 2026 the best achievement was reaching third place in 2013. The team participated twice in the Arab Cup U-17 in 2012 and 2022, they won the title in the first participation after defeating Iraq in the final. Tunisia U-17 team is one of the best teams in UNAF, the team participated in the UNAF U-17 Tournament twenty times, having won the title tree times in March 2008, December 2012 and 2017, it has also finished second five times and third place six times.

At the under-16 level, the team participated three times in the UNAF U-16 Tournament, winning the title twice in 2009 and 2026 and finishing second in 2015.

== Competitive records ==
Champions Runners-up Third place Fourth place

- Red border color indicates tournament was held on home soil.

=== FIFA U-17 World Cup ===
FIFA U-17 World Cup record
Year	Round	Position	Pld	W	D*	L	GF	GA
(China) 1985	Did not enter							
(Canada) 1987	Did not qualify							
(Scotland) 1989	Did not qualify							
(Italy) 1991	Did not qualify							
(Japan) 1993	Group stage	12th	3	1	0	2	2	5
(Ecuador) 1995	Did not qualify							
(Egypt) 1997	Did not qualify							
(New Zealand) 1999	Did not qualify							
(Trinidad and Tobago) 2001	Did not qualify							
(Finland) 2003	Did not qualify							
(Peru) 2005	Did not qualify							
(South Korea) 2007	Round of 16	9th	4	3	0	1	9	6
(Nigeria) 2009	Did not qualify							
(Mexico) 2011	Did not qualify							
(United Arab Emirates) 2013	Round of 16	12th	4	2	0	2	5	6
(Chile) 2015	Did not qualify							
(India) 2017	Did not qualify							
(Brazil) 2019	Did not qualify							
(Indonesia) 2023	Did not qualify							
(Qatar) 2025	Round of 32	32nd	4	1	0	3	6	5
(Qatar) 2026	Did not qualify							
(Qatar) 2027	Did not qualify							
(Qatar) 2028	To be determined							
(Qatar) 2029	To be determined							
Total	Round of 16	4/22	15	7	0	8	22	22

=== U-17 Africa Cup of Nations ===
U-17 Africa Cup of Nations record
Year	Round	Position	Pld	W	D*	L	GF	GA
(Mali) 1995	Group stage	7th	3	1	0	2	2	10
(Botswana) 1997	Did not qualify							
(Guinea) 1999	Did not qualify							
(Seychelles) 2001	Did not qualify							
(Eswatini) 2003	Did not qualify							
(The Gambia) 2005	Did not qualify							
(Togo) 2007	Fourth Place	4th	5	1	2	2	5	5
(Algeria) 2009	Did not qualify							
(Rwanda) 2011	Did not qualify							
(Morocco) 2013	Third Place	3rd	5	3	1	1	11	9
(Niger) 2015	Did not qualify							
(Gabon) 2017	Did not qualify							
(Tanzania) 2019	Did not qualify							
(Algeria) 2023	Did not qualify							
(Morocco) 2025	Quarter-finals	5th	4	2	2	0	6	2
(Morocco) 2026	Group stage	14th	3	0	1	2	2	4
(Morocco) 2027	Did not qualify							
Total	Third place	5/17	20	7	6	7	26	30

=== Arab Cup U-17 ===
Arab Cup U-17 record
Year	Round	Position	Pld	W	D*	L	GF	GA
(Saudi Arabia) 2011	Did not participate							
(Tunisia) 2012	Champions	1st	5	4	1	0	16	4
(Qatar) 2014	Did not participate							
(Morocco) 2021	Qualified but cancelled due to the COVID-19 pandemic							
(Algeria) 2022	Quarter-finals	–	4	1	3	0	4	3
Total	1 Title	2/4	9	5	4	0	20	7

=== UNAF U-17 Tournament ===
UNAF U-17 Tournament record
Year	Round	Position	Pld	W	D*	L	GF	GA
(Algeria) 2006	Runners-up	2nd	2	0	2	0	0	0
(Morocco) 2007	Runners-up	2nd	3	2	0	1	0	0
(Tunisia) Mar 2008	Champions	1st	3	2	1	0	7	2
(Algeria) Dec 2008	Fourth Place	4th	4	1	1	2	3	4
(Tunisia) 2009	Group stage	5th	2	0	1	1	0	1
(Tunisia) 2010	Runners-up	2nd	3	1	1	1	3	3
(Morocco) 2011	Fourth Place	4th	2	0	2	0	0	0
(Tunisia) Mar 2012	Third Place	3rd	2	0	1	1	1	2
(Morocco) Dec 2012	Champions	1st	2	1	1	0	8	6
(Morocco) 2014	Third Place	3rd	2	1	0	1	3	4
(Morocco) 2016	Runners-up	2nd	3	1	2	0	5	3
(Morocco) 2017	Champions	1st	4	1	1	1	4	2
(Tunisia) Aug 2018	Third Place	3rd	3	1	0	2	1	3
(Morocco) Dec 2018	Third Place	3rd	3	2	0	1	5	5
(Algeria) 2021	Runners-up	2nd	2	1	1	0	2	1
(Algeria) Mar 2022	Third Place	3rd	4	2	0	2	7	6
(Algeria) Nov 2022	Fourth Place	4th	3	1	0	2	4	7
(Algeria) Apr 2024	Fourth Place	4th	4	0	3	1	4	5
(Morocco) Nov 2024	Third Place	3rd	4	2	1	1	7	6
(Libya) Apr 2026	Fourth Place	4th	4	1	1	2	3	5
(Tunisia) Nov 2026	Fourth Place	4th	3	1	0	2	6	8
Total	3 Titles	21/21	62	21	19	21	73	73

=== UNAF U-16 Tournament ===
UNAF U-16 Tournament record
Year	Round	Position	Pld	W	D*	L	GF	GA
(Morocco) 2009	Champions	1st	2	0	2	0	2	2
(Morocco) 2015	Runners-up	2nd	2	1	1	0	4	2
(Tunisia) 2026	Champions	1st	3	3	0	0	9	3
Total	2 Titles	3/3	7	4	3	0	15	7

== Honours ==
- U-17 Africa Cup of Nations

(bronze) Third Place (1): 2013

- Arab Cup U-17

(gold) Champions (1): 2012

- UNAF U-17 Tournament

(gold) Champions (3): Mar 2008, Dec 2012, 2017
(silver) Runners-up (5): 2006, 2007, 2010, 2016, 2021
(bronze) Third Place (6): Mar 2012, 2014, Aug 2018, Dec 2018, Mar 2022, Nov 2024

- UNAF U-16 Tournament

(gold) Champions (2): 2009, 2026
(silver) Runners-up: 2015

== See also ==
- Tunisia national football team
- Tunisia A' national football team
- Tunisia national under-23 football team
- Tunisia national under-20 football team
- Tunisia national under-18 football team
- Tunisia national under-15 football team
