= Mohamed Nadir Ziane =

Algerian footballer (born 1992)

Nadir Ziane
Personal information
- Full name: Mohamed Nadir Ziane
- Date of birth: March 27, 1992 (age 34)
- Place of birth: Maghnia, Algeria
- Position: Midfielder

Senior career*
Years	Team	Apps	(Gls)
2009–2014	JSM Béjaïa	4	(0)
2014–2016	US Oued Amizour	-	(-)

International career
2008–2009	Algeria U17	12	(2)
- * Club domestic league appearances and goals

Mohamed Nadir Ziane (born March 27, 1992) is an Algerian footballer who is currently without a club. Ziane was part of the Algeria national under-17 football team that finished as runner-ups at the 2009 African U-17 Championship and also played at the 2009 FIFA U-17 World Cup.
