= Abdelhakim Bezzaz =

Algerian footballer (born 1992)

Personal information
- Full name: Abdelhakim Bezzaz
- Date of birth: October 20, 1992 (age 34)
- Place of birth: Médéa, Algeria
- Position: Midfielder

Team information
- Current team: USM Annaba
- Number: 14

Youth career
- 2012/2013: CA Bordj Bou Arréridj

Senior career*
Years	Team	Apps	(Gls)
2013–2014	WA Rouiba	0	(0)
2014–2016	AS Khroub	0	(0)
2016–2017	WR M'Sila	0	(0)
2017	DRB Tadjenanet	0	(0)
2018	RC Arbaâ	0	(0)
2018–2019	USM Khenchela	0	(0)
2019–2020	AS Khroub	0	(0)
2020–2022	MO Constantine	0	(0)
2022–2023	AS Khroub	0	(0)
2023–2024	MSP Batna	0	(0)
2024–2025	MO Constantine	0	(0)
2025–2026	MSP Batna	8	(0)
2026–	USM Annaba	0	(0)

International career
2008–2009	Algeria U17	11	(1)
2010	Algeria U20	3	(0)
- * Club domestic league appearances and goals as of 24 August 2026

Abdelhakim Bezzaz (born October 20, 1992) is an Algerian footballer who currently plays for USM Annaba in the Algerian Ligue 2.

Bezzaz was part of the Algeria national under-17 football team that finished as runner-ups at the 2009 African U-17 Championship and also played at the 2009 FIFA U-17 World Cup.

Bezzaz is the nephew of former Algeria international Yacine Bezzaz.
