= 2012 UNAF U-17 Tournament =

Tournament details
- Country: Tunisia
- Dates: 20–24 March
- Teams: 3

Final positions
- Champions: Algeria (3rd title)
- Runners-up: Mauritania

Tournament statistics
- Matches played: 3
- Goals scored: 5 (1.67 per match)
- Top goal scorer: (Algeria) Rezki Hamroune

The 2012 UNAF U-17 Tournament was the 8th edition of the UNAF U-17 Tournament. The tournament took place in Kalâa Kebira, Tunisia between 20 and 24 March 2012. Algeria won the competition after finishing first in the round robin stage.

== Participants ==
- Algeria
- Tunisia
- Mauritania (invited)

== Tournament ==
Team	Pld	W	D	L	GF	GA	GD	Pts
Algeria	2	1	1	0	2	0	+2	4
Mauritania	2	1	0	1	2	3	-1	3
Tunisia	2	0	1	1	1	2	-1	1

March 20, 2012

Algeria	2 – 0	Mauritania
Rezki Hamroune 15', 60'	Report

Kalâa Kebira
Referee: Nasrallah Jawadi (Tunisie)

March 22, 2012

Tunisia	1 – 2	Mauritania
Firas Msakni 1'	Report	Mohamed Falkore 3'; Moussa Malaynine 90+2'

Kalâa Kebira
Referee: Mokhtar Amalou (Algeria)

March 24, 2012
15:00

Tunisia	0 – 0	Algeria
	Report

Kalâa Kebira
Referee: Mounir Mabrouk (Morocco)

== Champions ==
2012 UNAF U-17 Tournament Winners

Algeria
3rd Title

== Scorers ==
2 goals

- (Algeria) Rezki Hamroune

1 goal

- (Mauritania) Mohamed Falkore
- (Mauritania) Moussa Malaynine
- (Tunisia) Firas Msakni
