= 2017 UNAF U-17 Tournament =

Tournament details
- Country: Morocco
- Dates: 20–24 August
- Teams: 4

Final positions
- Champions: Tunisia (4th title)
- Runners-up: Libya
- Third place: Algeria

Tournament statistics
- Matches played: 6
- Goals scored: 17 (2.83 per match)

The 2017 UNAF U-17 Tournament is the 12th edition of the UNAF U-17 Tournament. The tournament took place in Rabat, Morocco between 20 andd 24 August 2017.

== Participants ==
- Algeria
- Libya
- Morocco (hosts)
- Tunisia

== Venue ==
- Maamora sports centre, Salé

== Tournament ==
Team	Pld	W	D	L	GF	GA	GD	Pts	
Tunisia	3	1	1	1	4	2	+2	4	
Libya	3	2	0	1	6	5	+1	4	1 point for winning in penalties
Algeria	3	2	0	1	3	5	-2	2	1 point for winning in penalties
Morocco	3	0	1	2	4	5	-1	1	

August 20, 2017

Tunisia	2 – 0	Algeria

Maamora sports centre, Salé
August 20, 2017

Morocco	2 – 3	Libya

Maamora sports centre, Salé

August 22, 2017

Tunisia	1 – 1	Libya
Penalties
	5–6

Maamora sports centre, Salé
August 22, 2017

Morocco	1 – 1	Algeria
Penalties
	4–5

Maamora sports centre, Salé

August 24, 2017

Libya	2 – 2	Algeria
Penalties
	3–4

Maamora sports centre, Salé
August 24, 2017

Morocco	1 – 1	Tunisia

Maamora sports centre, Salé

== Champions ==
2017 UNAF U-17 Tournament Winners

Tunisia
4th Title
