= 2008 UNAF U-17 Tournament (Tunisia) =

Tournament details
- Country: Tunisia
- Date: 24–29 March

Final positions
- Champions: Tunisia
- Runners-up: Algeria

Tournament statistics
- Matches played: 6
- Goals scored: 15 (2.5 per match)

The 2008 UNAF U-17 Tournament was the 3rd edition of the UNAF U-17 Tournament. It took place in Tunisia between 24 and 29 March 2008. Tunisia won the tournament after topping the round robin competition.

== Participants ==
- Tunisia
- Algeria
- Morocco
- Libya

== Tournament ==
Team	Pld	W	D	L	GF	GA	GD	Pts
Tunisia	3	2	1	0	7	2	+5	7
Algeria	3	2	1	0	4	0	+4	7
Morocco	3	1	0	2	3	5	-3	3
Libya	3	0	0	3	1	8	-7	0

24 March 2008
14:00 UTC+1

Algeria	2 - 0	Libya
	Report

Korba

24 March 2008
15:00 UTC+1

Tunisia	3 - 1	Morocco

Menzel Bouzalfa

26 March 2008
14:00 UTC+1

Tunisia	4 - 1	Libya

Grombalia

26 March 2008
15:00 UTC+1

Algeria	2 - 0	Morocco
	Report

Beni Khaled

29 March 2008
13:00 UTC+1

Libya	0 - 2	Morocco

Korba

29 March 2008
15:00 UTC+1

Tunisia	0 - 0	Algeria
	Report

Korba

== Champions ==
2008 UNAF U-17 Tournament Winners

Tunisia
1st Title
