= UNAF U-17 Tournament =

- Organiser(s): UNAF
- Founded: 2006; 20 years ago
- Region: North Africa
- Teams: 5 (plus guests)
- Current champions: Algeria (5th title)
- Most championships: Algeria; Morocco (5 titles)
- Website: unafonline.org
- 2026 UNAF U-17 Tournament (Tunisia)

The UNAF U-17 Tournament is the annual international youth football tournament organized by the Union of North African Football (UNAF) for its nations consisting of players under the age of 17. However, the tournament invites teams from other nations.

Algeria are the tournament's current champions after winning the 2026 tournament, they are also the most successful nation winning the tournament with Morocco (five times).

== Results ==
Ed.	Year	Host	First place game			Third place game		
Ed.	Year	Host	(gold) Champion	Score	(silver) Runner-up	(bronze) Third place	Score	Fourth place
1	2006	Algeria	Algeria	round-robin	Tunisia	Egypt		
2	2007	Morocco	Morocco	round-robin	Tunisia	Libya	round-robin	Algeria
3	Mar 2008	Tunisia	Tunisia	round-robin	Algeria	Morocco	round-robin	Libya
4	Dec 2008	Algeria	Algeria	round-robin	Libya	Guinea	round-robin	Tunisia
5	2009	Tunisia	Burkina Faso	3–2	Morocco	Libya	2–0	United Arab Emirates
6	2010	Tunisia	Mali	1–0	Tunisia	Guinea	4–1	Morocco
7	2011	Morocco	Morocco	2–0	Algeria	Mauritania	2–2 (5–4 p)	Tunisia
8	Mar 2012	Tunisia	Algeria	round-robin	Mauritania	Tunisia		
9	Dec 2012	Morocco	Tunisia	round-robin	Libya	Morocco	round-robin	Mauritania
10	2014	Morocco	Egypt	3–1	Morocco	Tunisia	2–0	Libya
11	2016	Morocco	Burkina Faso	round-robin	Tunisia	Algeria	round-robin	Egypt
12	2017	Morocco	Tunisia	round-robin	Libya	Algeria	round-robin	Morocco
13	Aug 2018	Tunisia	Morocco	round-robin	Algeria	Tunisia	round-robin	Libya
14	Dec 2018	Morocco	Senegal	1–1 (5–4 p)	Morocco	Tunisia	2–1	Algeria
15	2021	Algeria	Algeria	round-robin	Tunisia	Libya		
16	Mar 2022	Algeria	Egypt	round-robin	Morocco	Tunisia	round-robin	Algeria
17	Nov 2022	Algeria	Morocco	round-robin	Egypt	Libya	round-robin	Tunisia
18	Apr 2024	Algeria	Egypt	round-robin	Algeria	Morocco	round-robin	Tunisia
19	Nov 2024	Morocco	Egypt	round-robin	Morocco	Tunisia	round-robin	Algeria
20	Mar 2026	Libya	Morocco	round-robin	Algeria	Egypt	round-robin	Tunisia
21	Nov 2026	Tunisia	Algeria	round-robin	Egypt	Morocco	round-robin	Tunisia

== Statistics ==
=== Summary ===
Team	Winners	Runners-up	Third place	Fourth place
Morocco	5 (2007*, 2011*, Aug 2018, Nov 2022, Apr 2026)	5 (2009, 2014*, Dec 2018*, Mar 2022, Nov 2024*)	4 (Mar 2008, Dec 2012*, Apr 2024*, Nov 2026)	2 (2010, 2017*)
Algeria	5 (2006*, Dec 2008*, Mar 2012, 2021*, Nov 2026)	5 (Mar 2008, 2011, Aug 2018, Apr 2024*, Apr 2026)	2 (2016, 2017)	4 (2007, Dec 2018, Mar 2022*, Nov 2024)
Egypt	4 (2014, Mar 2022, Apr 2024, Nov 2024)	2 (Nov 2022, Nov 2026)	2 (2006, Apr 2026)	1 (2016)
Tunisia	3 (Mar 2008*, Dec 2012, 2017)	5 (2006, 2007, 2010*, 2016, 2021)	6 (Mar 2012*, 2014, Aug 2018*, Dec 2018, Mar 2022, Nov 2024)	6 (Dec 2008, 2011, Nov 2022, Apr 2024, Apr 2026, Nov 2026)
Burkina Faso	2 (2009, 2016)	—	—	—
Mali	1 (2010)	—	—	—
Senegal	1 (Dec 2018)	—	—	—
Libya	—	3 (Dec 2008, Dec 2012, 2017)	3 (2007, 2021, Nov 2022)	3 (Mar 2008, 2014, Aug 2018)
Mauritania	—	1 (Mar 2012)	1 (2011)	1 (Dec 2012)
Guinea	—	—	2 (Dec 2008, 2010)	—
United Arab Emirates	—	—	—	1 (2009)

=== Participating nations ===
Team	(Algeria) 2006	(Morocco) 2007	(Tunisia) Mar 2008	(Algeria) Dec 2008	(Tunisia) 2009	(Tunisia) 2010	(Morocco) 2011	(Tunisia) Mar 2012	(Morocco) Dec 2012	(Morocco) 2014	(Morocco) 2016	(Morocco) 2017	(Tunisia) Aug 2018	(Morocco) Dec 2018	(Algeria) 2021	(Algeria) Mar 2022	(Algeria) Nov 2022	(Algeria) Apr 2024	(Morocco) Nov 2024	(Libya) Apr 2026	(Tunisia) Nov 2026	Apps.
Algeria	1st	4th	2nd	1st	6th	5th	2nd	1st	×	×	3rd	3rd	2nd	4th	1st	5th	×	2nd	4th	2nd	1st	18
Egypt	3rd	×	×	×	×	×	×	×	×	1st	4th	×	×	×	×	1st	2nd	1st	1st	3rd	2nd	9
Libya	×	3rd	4th	2nd	3rd	×	×	×	2nd	4th	6th	2nd	4th	5th	3rd	4th	3rd	5th	5th	5th	×	16
Morocco	×	1st	3rd	5th	2nd	4th	1st	×	3rd	2nd	GS	4th	1st	2nd	×	2nd	1st	3rd	2nd	1st	3rd	18
Tunisia	2nd	2nd	1st	4th	5th	2nd	4th	3rd	1st	3rd	2nd	1st	3rd	3rd	2nd	3rd	4th	4th	3rd	4th	4th	21
Invited nations
Bahrain						6th																1
Burkina Faso					1st						1st											2
Guinea				3rd		3rd																2
Mali						1st																1
Mauritania							3rd	2nd	4th					6th								4
Senegal														1st								1
United Arab Emirates					4th																	1

Legend

- 1st – Champions
- 2nd – Runners-up
- 3rd – Third place
- 4th – Fourth place
- 5th – Fifth place
- 6th – Sixth place
- Q – Qualified for upcoming tournament
- × — Did not enter / Withdrew / Disqualified
- — Hosts

== See also ==
- UNAF U-23 Tournament
- UNAF U-20 Tournament
- UNAF U-18 Tournament
- UNAF U-16 Tournament
- UNAF U-15 Tournament
