= 2026 UNAF U-16 Tournament =

Tournament details
- Host country: Tunisia
- Dates: 4–8 February
- Teams: 4
- Venues: 2 (in 2 host cities)

Final positions
- Champions: Tunisia (2nd title)
- Runners-up: Algeria
- Third place: Morocco
- Fourth place: Libya

The 2026 UNAF U-16 Tournament was the 3nd edition of the UNAF U-16 Tournament. The tournament took place in Tunisia, from 4 to 8 February 2026. Tunisia won the title for the second time.

== Participants ==
The four participating teams were:

- Algeria
- Morocco (Holders)
- Libya
- Tunisia (Hosts)

== Venues ==
City	Stadium
Kalâa Kebira	Kalâa Municipal Stadium
M'saken	M'saken Municipal Stadium

== Tournament ==
All times are local, CET (UTC+1)

Pos	Team	Pld	W	D	L	GF	GA	GD	Pts	Final result
1	Tunisia (H)	3	3	0	0	9	3	+6	9	Champions
2	Algeria	3	1	1	1	4	5	−1	4	Runners-up
3	Morocco	3	0	2	1	4	5	−1	2	Third place
4	Libya	3	0	0	3	2	6	−4	0	Fourth place

Source: UNAF
Rules for classification: Group stage tiebreakers
(H) Hosts

=== Matches ===
4 February 2026
12:00

Tunisia	3–0	Libya
	Report

M'saken Municipal Stadium, M'saken
4 February 2026
13:00

Morocco	1–1	Algeria
	Report

Kalâa Municipal Stadium, Kalâa Kebira

6 February 2026
12:00

Algeria	1–3	Tunisia
	Report

Kalâa Municipal Stadium, Kalâa Kebira
6 February 2026
12:00

Libya	1–1	Morocco
	Report

M'saken Municipal Stadium, M'saken

8 February 2026
11:00

Algeria	2–1	Libya
	Report

M'saken Municipal Stadium, M'saken
8 February 2026
14:00

Tunisia	3–2	Morocco
	Report

M'saken Municipal Stadium, M'saken
