= Omar Moawad =

Egyptian footballer (born 2006)

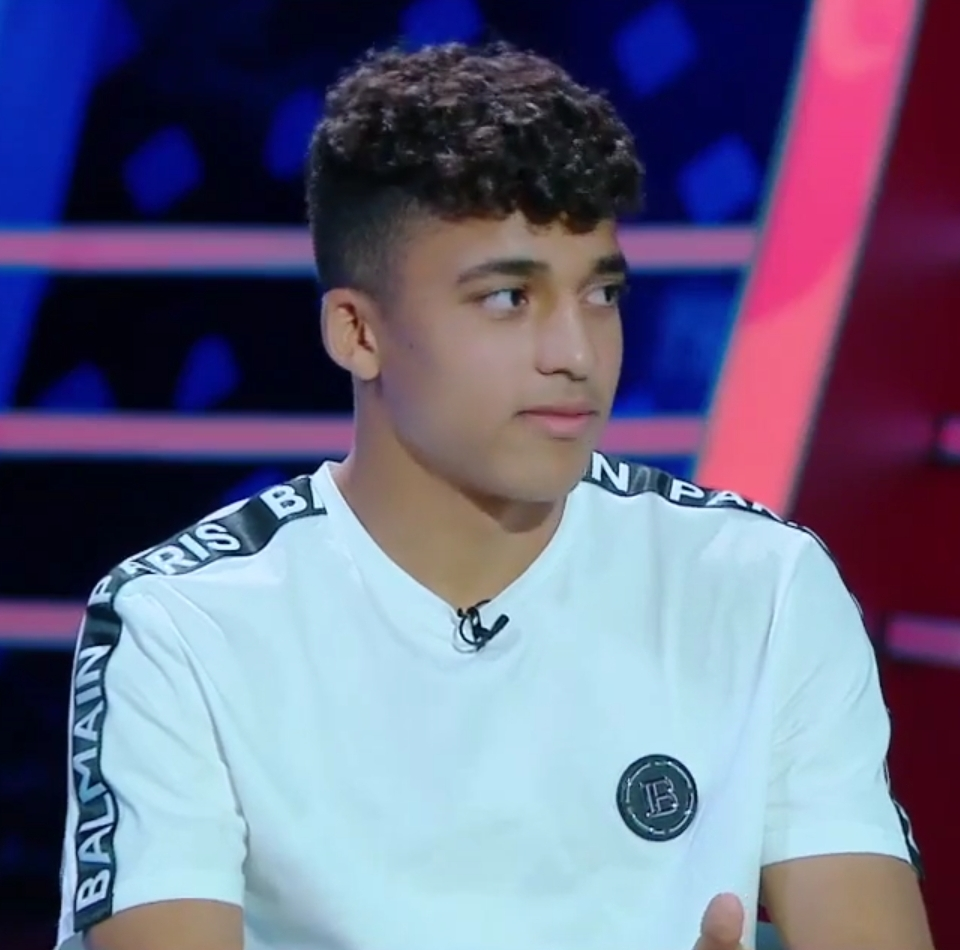
- Omar in Al Ahly TV

Personal information
- Full name: Omar Sayed Moawad Mohamed Abdelwahed
- Date of birth: 14 October 2006 (age 20)
- Place of birth: Ismailia, Egypt
- Height: 1.74 m (5 ft 9 in)
- Position: Winger

Team information
- Current team: Al Ahly
- Number: 14

Youth career
- 2015–2025: Al Ahly Youth
- 2025: Real Betis Cantera

Senior career*
Years	Team	Apps	(Gls)
2025–	Al Ahly	1	(0)

International career
2022–2024	Egypt U17	11	(5)
2024–	Egypt U20		
- * Club domestic league appearances and goals as of 16:23, 24 August 2026 (UTC)

Omar Sayed Moawad Abdelwahed (Arabic: عمر معوض; born 14 October 2006) is an Egyptian professional footballer who plays as a winger for Egyptian Premier League club Al Ahly SC.

Omar joined Real Betis Cantera in January 2025 in a permanent transfer from Al Ahly.

== Club career ==
=== Real Betis ===
Omar spent a trial period with Real Betis from 14 July 2023 to 11 August 2023. The young forward was 17 at the time of his trial with the Real Betis (B) team.

His performances during the trial period seemed to impress the Spanish club, to the point where they placed a bid to sign him from Al Ahly in September 2023. However, he tore his ACL, putting the deal on hold.

In October 2024, negotiations resumed between Al Ahly management and Real Betis management. On 16 October 2024, the deal was announced through the player's agent.

Omar Sayed Moawad is set to become the second Egyptian at Real Betis after Amro Tarek, who briefly played for the club. He will also be the third Egyptian in La Liga, following Mido’s stint at Celta Vigo.

== Style of play ==
Omar is primarily a right winger but can line up anywhere across the front line. He's shown the capability to perform as a playmaker and False Nine while also being able to line up on the left wing.

== Personal life ==
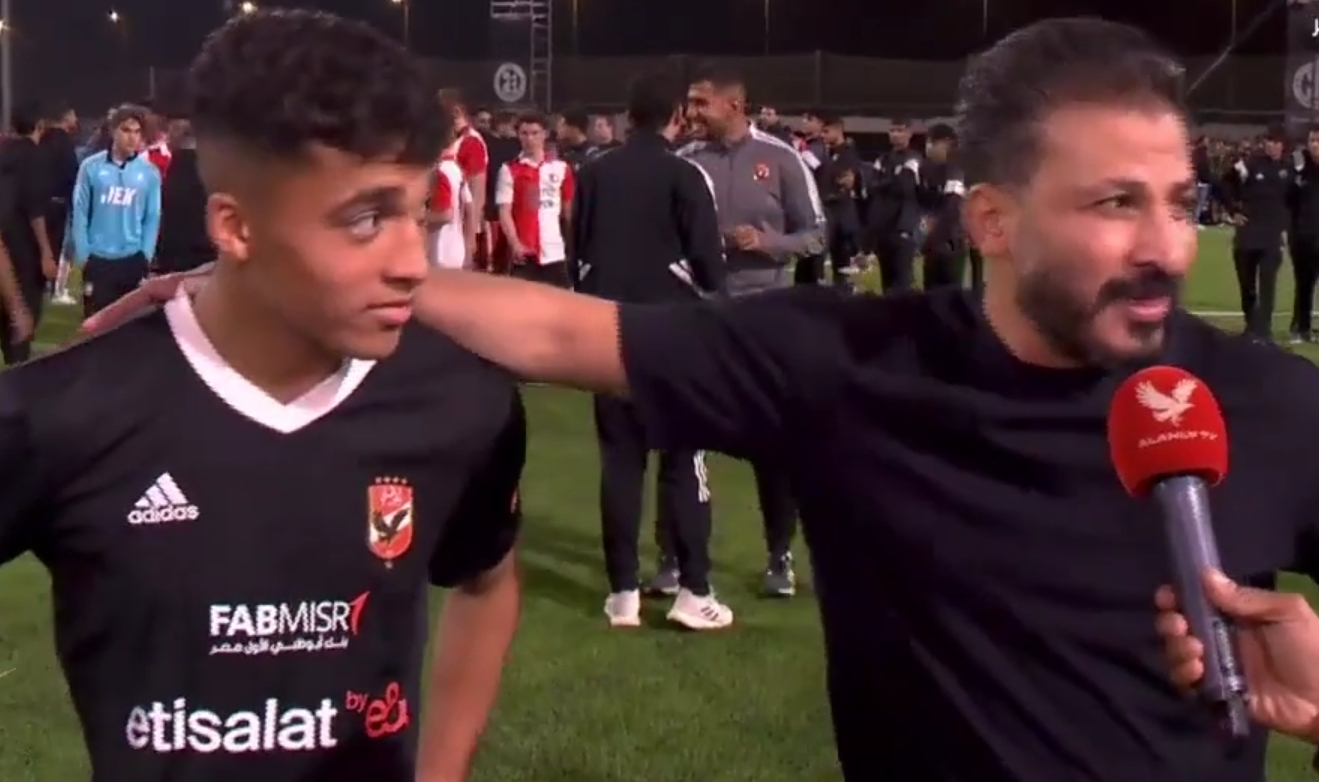
Omar with his father Sayed Moawad

Omar is the son of former Egyptian national team left-back Sayed Moawad, and the grandson of the Egyptian coach Ramadan El Sayed.
