= 2015 UNAF U-16 Tournament =

Tournament details
- Host country: Morocco
- Dates: 7 – 11 June
- Teams: 3

Final positions
- Champions: Mauritania
- Runners-up: Tunisia
- Third place: Morocco

Tournament statistics
- Matches played: 3
- Goals scored: 8 (2.67 per match)

The 2015 UNAF U-16 Tournament was the 2nd edition of the UNAF U-16 Tournament. The tournament took place in Rabat, Morocco, on June 7-11, 2015.

== Participants ==
- Morocco (hosts)
- Tunisia
- Mauritania (invited)

== Venues ==
- Complexe Sportif de Salé of the Académie Mohamed VI, Salé

== Tournament ==
Team	Pld	W	D	L	GF	GA	GD	Pts
Mauritania	2	1	1	0	4	2	+2	4
Tunisia	2	0	2	0	2	2	0	2
Morocco	2	0	1	1	2	4	-2	1

7 June 2015
16:30

Morocco	1 – 3	Mauritania
Abdellatif 72'	Report	Abdou 25'; Salem 37'; Soulleimane 84'

Complexe Sportif, Salé
Referee: Yacine Harrouche (Tunisia)

9 June 2015
16:30

Tunisia	1 – 1	Mauritania
Kasab 90'		– 69'

Complexe Sportif, Salé
Referee: Abed Laaziz Msalek (Morocco)

11 June 2015
16:30

Morocco	1 – 1	Tunisia

Complexe Sportif, Salé
