= 2006 UNAF U-17 Tournament =

Tournament details
- Host country: Algeria
- Dates: 22–27 March
- Teams: 3

Final positions
- Champions: Algeria (1st title)
- Runners-up: Tunisia

Tournament statistics
- Matches played: 3
- Goals scored: 0 (0 per match)
- Best player: (Algeria) Mohamed Amine Saïdoune

The 2006 UNAF U-17 Tournament was the 1st edition of the UNAF U-17 Tournament. It was held in Algeria between 22 and 27 March 2006. Algeria was crowned champions after a drawing of lots.

== Participants ==
- Algeria
- Egypt
- Tunisia

== Tournament ==
Team	Pld	W	D	L	GF	GA	GD	Pts
Algeria	2	0	2	0	0	0	0	2
Tunisia	2	0	2	0	0	0	0	2
Egypt	2	0	2	0	0	0	0	2

22 March 2006

Algeria	0–0	Tunisia
	Report

Rouiba

25 March 2006

Egypt	0–0	Tunisia

Réghaïa

27 March 2006

Algeria	0–0	Egypt
	Report

Réghaïa

== Champions ==
2006 UNAF U-17 Tournament Winners

Algeria
1st Title
