= 2009 UNAF U-16 Tournament =

Tournament details
- Host country: Morocco
- Dates: 19–25 December
- Teams: 3

Final positions
- Champions: Tunisia
- Runners-up: Algeria

Tournament statistics
- Matches played: 3
- Goals scored: 4 (1.33 per match)

The 2009 UNAF U-16 Tournament was the 1st edition of the UNAF U-16 Tournament took place in December 2009, with Morocco as the host of the tournament.

== Participants ==
- Tunisia
- Algeria
- Morocco
- Libya (withdrew)

== Tournament ==
Team	Pld	W	D	L	GF	GA	GD	Pts
Tunisia	2	0	2	0	2	2	0	2
Algeria	2	0	2	0	1	1	0	2
Morocco	2	0	2	0	1	1	0	2

19 December 2009

Morocco	1 - 1	Tunisia
Aounallah 24'	(Report)	Saidi (?)

Stade Municipal (Kenitra)

22 December 2009

Algeria	1 - 1	Tunisia
Meziane 56'	(Report)	Aounallah 23'

Stade Municipal (Kenitra)

25 December 2009
14:30 UTC+1

Morocco	0 - 0	Algeria
	(Report)

Stade Municipal (Kenitra)
