= 2009 UNAF U-17 Tournament (Tunisia) =

Tournament details
- Host country: Tunisia
- Dates: 12–20 August
- Teams: 6 (from 2 confederations)

Final positions
- Champions: Burkina Faso
- Runners-up: Morocco

Tournament statistics
- Matches played: 8
- Goals scored: 16 (2 per match)

The 2009 UNAF U-17 Tournament was the 5th edition of the UNAF U-17 Tournament that took place in Ain Draham, Tunisia between 12 and 20 August 2009.

== Group stage ==
All times are local UTC+1.

=== Group A ===
Team	Pld	W	D	L	GF	GA	GD	Pts
Burkina Faso	2	1	1	0	2	1	+1	4
United Arab Emirates	2	1	0	1	4	1	+3	3
Algeria	2	0	1	1	1	5	-4	1

Burkina Faso	1 - 0	United Arab Emirates

United Arab Emirates	4 - 0	Algeria

Algeria	1 - 1	Burkina Faso

=== Group B ===
Team	Pld	W	D	L	GF	GA	GD	Pts
Morocco	2	1	1	0	1	0	+1	4
Libya	2	1	0	1	1	1	0	3
Tunisia	2	0	1	1	0	1	-1	1

Libya	0 - 1	Morocco

Tunisia	0 - 0	Morocco

Libya	1 - 0	Tunisia

== Knockout stage ==
=== Third-place match ===
Libya	2 - 0	United Arab Emirates

=== Final ===
Burkina Faso	3 - 2	Morocco

== Champions ==
2009 UNAF U-17 Tournament Winners

Burkina Faso
1st Title
