= Beni Khaled =

Village of Minya in Egypt

- Village
- Location of Beni Khaled in Egypt
- Country: Egypt
- Governorate: Minya
- Time zone: UTC+2 (EET)
  - Summer (DST): UTC+3 (EEST)

Beni Khaled is a village of Minya Governorate in Egypt.
