= 2012 UNAF U-17 Tournament (Morocco) =

Tournament details
- Country: Morocco
- Dates: 24–27 December
- Teams: 4

Final positions
- Champions: Tunisia (3rd title)
- Runners-up: Libya
- Third place: Morocco

Tournament statistics
- Matches played: 4
- Goals scored: 16 (4 per match)

The 2012 UNAF U-17 Tournament (Morocco) is the 9th edition of the UNAF U-17 Tournament and the second one this year after the Tunisian edition. The tournament took place in Rabat, Morocco between 24 and 27 December 2012.

== Participants ==
- Libya
- Morocco
- Mauritania (invited)
- Tunisia

== Tournament ==
Team	Pld	W	D	L	GF	GA	GD	Pts
Tunisia	2	1	1	0	8	6	+2	4
Libya	2	1	1	0	4	3	+1	4
Morocco	2	1	0	1	1	1	0	3
Mauritania	2	0	0	2	3	6	-3	0

December 24, 2012
14:30

Tunisia	3 – 3	Libya
Haj Hassan 9'; Omrani 80'; Samti 90+3'		20', 54' Driss; 61' Ellafi

Stade Moulay Hassan, Rabat
Referee: Hichem Tiazi (Morocco)
December 24, 2012
17:30

Morocco	1 – 0	Mauritania
Hadji 72'

Stade Moulay Hassan, Rabat
Referee: ... ... (...)

December 27, 2012
14:30

Tunisia	5 – 3	Mauritania
Ben Salem 2', 61'; Samti 18'; Aboud 55'; Haj Hassan 86'		Kory 33'; Youssef 40'; Sidi 75' (pen.)

Stade Moulay Hassan, Rabat
Referee: ... ... (...)
December 27, 2012
17:30

Libya	1 – 0	Morocco
Mohamed Taktak 8'

Stade Moulay Hassan, Rabat
Referee: Nasreddine Jaouadi (Tunisia)

== Champions ==
2012 UNAF U-17 Tournament Winners

Tunisia
3rd Title

== Scorers ==
2 goals

- (Libya) Ayoub Driss
- (Tunisia) Nidal Ben Salem
- (Tunisia) Hazem Haj Hassan
- (Tunisia) Chams Samti

1 goal

- (Libya) Mouadh Ellafi
- (Libya) Mohamed Taktak
- (Mauritania) Mohamed Kory
- (Mauritania) El Hassan Moctar Sidi
- (Mauritania) Gueye Youssef
- (Morocco) Ali Hadji
- (Tunisia) Moez Aboud
- (Tunisia) Ameur Omrani
