= 2014 UNAF U-17 Tournament =

Tournament details
- Country: Morocco
- Dates: 21–23 March
- Teams: 4

Final positions
- Champions: Egypt (1st title)
- Runners-up: Morocco
- Third place: Tunisia
- Fourth place: Libya

Tournament statistics
- Matches played: 4
- Goals scored: 14 (3.5 per match)

The 2014 UNAF U-17 Tournament was the 10th edition of the UNAF U-17 Tournament took place in Morocco between 21 and 23 March 2014.

== Participants ==
- Morocco (host)
- Egypt
- Libya
- Tunisia

== Venues ==
- Stade Moulay Hassan, Rabat (15,000)
- Stade Municipal, Temara (5,000)

== Knockout stage ==
All times given as local time (UTC+0)

Semi finals
21 March 2014
Morocco	2
Libya	1
21 March 2014
Egypt	4
Tunisia	1

Final
23 March 2014
Morocco	1
Egypt	3
Third place play-off
23 March 2014
Libya	0
Tunisia	2

=== Final ===
23 March 2014

Morocco	1 - 3	Egypt
Idriss 46'		Adel 18'; Hamdy 35'; Alaa 86'

Stade Moulay Hassan, Rabat

== Champions ==
2014 UNAF U-17 Tournament Winners

Egypt
1st Title
