= 2007 UNAF U-17 Tournament =

Tournament details
- Host country: Morocco
- Dates: 2–9 September
- Teams: 4

Final positions
- Champions: Morocco
- Runners-up: Tunisia

Tournament statistics
- Matches played: 12

The 2007 UNAF U-17 Tournament was the 2nd edition of the UNAF U-17 Tournament took place in Morocco between 2 and 9 September 2007.

== Participants ==
- Tunisia
- Algeria
- Morocco
- Libya

== Tournament ==
Team	Pld	W	D	L	GF	GA	GD	Pts
Morocco	3	2	1	0	0	0	-3	7
Tunisia	3	2	0	1	0	0	+5	6
Libya	3	1	1	1	0	0	-6	4
Algeria	3	0	0	3	0	5	-5	0

2 September 2007

Morocco	3–0	Algeria
	Report

Casablanca

5 September 2007

Algeria	0–1	Tunisia

9 September 2007

Algeria	0–1	Libya

== Champions ==
2007 UNAF U-17 Tournament Winners

Morocco
1st Title
