= 2012 Arab Cup U-17 =

Tournament details
- Host country: Tunisia
- Dates: 2–16 July 2012
- Teams: 10 (from 2 confederations)
- Venues: 3 (in 3 host cities)

Final positions
- Champions: Tunisia (1st title)
- Runners-up: Iraq
- Third place: Morocco
- Fourth place: Yemen

Tournament statistics
- Matches played: 16
- Goals scored: 55 (3.44 per match)
- Top scorer: (Iraq) Sherko Karim (7 goals)
- Best player: (Iraq) Sherko Karim

The 2012 Arab Cup U-17 was an association football tournament between Arabic countries played in July 2012 and hosted in Tunisia.

== Participants ==
- Algeria
- Iraq
- Libya
- Mauritania
- Morocco
- Oman
- Saudi Arabia
- Sudan
- Tunisia
- Yemen

Kuwait and Syria withdrew from the tournament

== Group stage ==
=== Group A ===
| Team | Pld | W | D | L | GF | GA | GD | Pts |
|---|---|---|---|---|---|---|---|---|
| Tunisia | 3 | 3 | 0 | 0 | 12 | 3 | +9 | 9 |
| Mauritania | 3 | 1 | 1 | 1 | 5 | 5 | 0 | 4 |
| Oman | 3 | 1 | 1 | 1 | 3 | 6 | −3 | 4 |
| Libya | 3 | 0 | 0 | 3 | 2 | 8 | −6 | 0 |

2 July 2012
17:30

| Oman | 2–1 | Libya |
|---|---|---|
| Al-Roochadi 45'; Mubarek 84' | | Kouarsha 87' |

Stade Mustapha Ben Jannet, Monastir
Referee: Haitham Mohammed Ali (Iraq)

2 July 2012
19:40

| Tunisia | 4–2 | Mauritania |
|---|---|---|
| Naghmouchi 9'; Hassen 28'; Gabsi 48', 90+1' | | Sidi 65'; Koury 90' |

Stade Mustapha Ben Jannet, Monastir
Referee: Hashim Adam Ahmed (Sudan)

5 July 2012
17:30

| Libya | 0–2 | Mauritania |
|---|---|---|
| | | Koury 65' (pen.), 82' |

Stade Mustapha Ben Jannet, Monastir
Referee: Ali Gawf Bary (Yemen)

5 July 2012
19:40

| Oman | 0–4 | Tunisia |
|---|---|---|
| | | Samti 12', 39'; Hassen 55'; Omrani 78' |

Stade Mustapha Ben Jannet, Monastir
Referee: Sofiane Bousseter (Algeria)

8 July 2012
18:30

| Mauritania | 1–1 | Oman |
|---|---|---|
| 2' | | 80' |

Stade Mustapha Ben Jannet, Monastir
Referee: Mounir Mabrouk (Morocco)

8 July 2012
18:30

| Libya | 1–4 | Tunisia |
|---|---|---|
| Ghalabu 82' | | Rouahi 35'; Selmi 62'; Benarbi 72'; Ayadi 84' |

Stade Mustapha Ben Jannet, Monastir
Referee: Mohammad Arafah (Jordan)

=== Group B ===
| Team | Pld | W | D | L | GF | GA | GD | Pts |
|---|---|---|---|---|---|---|---|---|
| Iraq | 2 | 2 | 0 | 0 | 11 | 2 | +9 | 6 |
| Saudi Arabia | 2 | 1 | 0 | 1 | 5 | 5 | 0 | 3 |
| Sudan | 2 | 0 | 0 | 2 | 2 | 11 | −9 | 0 |

Syria withdrew from the tournament.

3 July 2012
18:00

| Sudan | 1–7 | Iraq |
|---|---|---|
| Muhamad 90+1' | | Karim 27', 45+1', 48', 59'; Khairi 38'; Fadel 74', 79' |

Stade Olympique de Sousse, Sousse
Referee: Mounir Mabrouk (Morocco)

6 July 2012
19:00

| Sudan | 1–4 | Saudi Arabia |
|---|---|---|
| Muhamad (...) | | Al-Shahrani (...); Mkabas 50', 77'; Al-Zeeny 68' |

Stade Olympique de Sousse, Sousse
Referee: Mohammad Arafah (Jordan)

9 July 2012
18:30

| Saudi Arabia | 1–4 | Iraq |
|---|---|---|
| Mkabas 25' | | Karim 13', 46'; Mahdi 43'; Kadhim 85' |

Stade Olympique de Sousse, Sousse
Referee: Nassrallah Jawadi (Tunisia)

=== Group C ===
| Team | Pld | W | D | L | GF | GA | GD | Pts |
|---|---|---|---|---|---|---|---|---|
| Yemen | 2 | 2 | 0 | 0 | 4 | 0 | +4 | 6 |
| Morocco | 2 | 1 | 0 | 1 | 2 | 1 | +1 | 3 |
| Algeria | 2 | 0 | 0 | 2 | 0 | 5 | −5 | 0 |

Kuwait withdrew from the tournament

4 July 2012
18:00

| Algeria | 0–3 | Yemen |
|---|---|---|
| | | Abeed 36'; Abdullah 68'; Al-Shahmi 75' |

Stade Municipal Bou Ali-Lahouar, Hammam Sousse
Referee: Nassrallah Jawadi (Tunisia)

7 July 2012
18:00

| Morocco | 0–1 | Yemen |
|---|---|---|
| | | Al-Dahi 80' |

Stade Municipal Bou Ali-Lahouar, Hammam Sousse
Referee: Hashim Adam Ahmed (Sudan)

10 July 2012
18:30

| Morocco | 2–0 | Algeria |
|---|---|---|
| El Moutaraji 56' sabbar 90' (pen.) |

Stade Municipal Bou Ali-Lahouar, Hammam Sousse
Referee: Mohammad Arafah (Jordan)

== Knockout stage ==
Semi-finals
13 July
Tunisia | 1 (4)
Morocco | 1(2)
13 July
Iraq | 3
Yemen | 0

Final
16 July
Tunisia | 3
Iraq | 0
Third place
13 July
Morocco | 1
Yemen | 0

=== Semifinals ===
13 July 2012
17:00

| Tunisia | 1–1 (a.e.t.) | Morocco |
|---|---|---|
| Ben Salem 60' | | El Moutaraji 18' |
Penalties
| | 4–2 |

Stade Mustapha Ben Jannet, Monastir
Referee: Hashim Adam Ahmed (Sudan)

13 July 2012
17:00

| Iraq | 3–0 | Yemen |
|---|---|---|
| Rasan 19'; Karim 36'; Kadhim 79' |

Stade Olympique de Sousse, Sousse
Referee: Sofiane Bousseter (Algeria)

=== Third place playoff ===
16 July 2012
16:30

| Morocco | 1–0 | Yemen |

Stade Mustapha Ben Jannet, Monastir
Referee: Nassrallah Jawadi (Tunisia)

=== Final ===
16 July 2012
19:30

| Tunisia | 3–0 | Iraq |
|---|---|---|
| Gabsi 5'; Samti 8', 90+4' (pen.) |

Stade Mustapha Ben Jannet, Monastir
Referee: Mounir Mabrouk (Morocco)

== Winners ==
2012 Arab U-17 Championship

Tunisia
First title

== Award winners ==
- Fair play Award: Iraq
- Best player: (Iraq) Sherko Kareem Lateef
- Top goal scorer (Golden Boot): (Iraq) Sherko Kareem Lateef (7 goals)
