= 2011 UNAF U-17 Tournament =

Tournament details
- Country: Morocco
- Dates: 20–23 December
- Teams: 4

Final positions
- Champions: Morocco (2nd title)
- Runners-up: Algeria
- Third place: Mauritania
- Fourth place: Tunisia

Tournament statistics
- Matches played: 4
- Goals scored: 6 (1.5 per match)

The 2011 UNAF U-17 Tournament was the 7th edition of the UNAF U-17 Tournament took place in Morocco between 20 and 23 December 2011.

== Participants ==
- Morocco (host)
- Algeria
- Tunisia
- Mauritania (invited)

== Stadium ==
- Prince Moulay Hassan Stadium, Rabat (15,000)

== Knockout stage ==
All times given as local time (UTC+0)

Semi finals
20 December 2011
Algeria	0 (5)
Tunisia (pen.)	0 (4)
20 December 2011
Morocco	0 (5)
Mauritania (pen.)	0 (3)

Final
23 December 2011
Algeria	0
Morocco	2
Third place play-off
23 December 2011
Tunisia	2 (4)
Mauritania	2 (5)

=== Semi-finals ===
20 December 2011
10:00 UTC+0

Algeria	0 - 0	Tunisia
	Report
Penalties
	5 – 4

Prince Moulay Hassan Stadium, Rabat

20 December 2011
14:30 UTC+0

Morocco	0 - 0	Mauritania
Penalties
	5 – 3

Prince Moulay Hassan Stadium, Rabat

=== Third place match ===
23 December 2011
10:00 UTC+0

Tunisia	2 - 2	Mauritania
Penalties
	4 – 5

Prince Moulay Hassan Stadium, Rabat
Referee: Sofiane Bousseter (Algeria)

=== Final ===
23 December 2011
14:30 UTC+0

Morocco	2 - 0	Algeria
Feqhaoui 35', 87'	Report

Prince Moulay Hassan Stadium, Rabat

== Champions ==
2011 UNAF U-17 Tournament Winners

Morocco
2nd Title
