= Salem Mabrouki Stadium =

Football stadium in Rouïba, Algeria

- Interactive map of Salem Mabrouki Stadium
- Former names: Rouïba Stadium
- Location: Rouïba, Algiers, Algeria
- Coordinates: 36.733333°N 3.283333°E
- Operator: APC Rouïba
- Capacity: 12,000
- Surface: grass
- Field size: 100 m × 60 m

Construction
- Opened: 1980
- Renovated: 2020

Salem Mabrouki Stadium (Arabic: ملعب سالم مبروكي) is a multi-purpose stadium in Rouïba, Algiers, Algeria. It is currently used mostly for football matches. The stadium has a capacity of 12,000 people.
