= 2010 UNAF U-17 Tournament =

Tournament details
- Host country: Tunisia
- Dates: July
- Teams: 6 (from 2 confederations)

Final positions
- Champions: Mali
- Runners-up: Tunisia

Tournament statistics
- Matches played: 9
- Goals scored: 20 (2.22 per match)

The 2010 UNAF U-17 Tournament was the 6th edition of the UNAF U-17 Tournament took place in Tunisia in July 2010.

== Participants ==
- Tunisia
- Algeria
- Morocco
- Mali (invited)
- Guinea (invited)
- Bahrain (invited)

== Group stage ==
All times are local UTC+1.

=== Group A ===
Team	Pld	W	D	L	GF	GA	GD	Pts
Tunisia	2	1	1	0	3	2	+1	4
Guinea	2	1	0	1	4	3	+1	3
Bahrain	2	0	1	1	2	4	-2	1

Tunisia	2–1	Guinea

Bahrain	1–1	Tunisia

Guinea	3–1	Bahrain

=== Group B ===
Team	Pld	W	D	L	GF	GA	GD	Pts
Mali	2	2	0	0	2	0	+2	6
Morocco	2	0	1	1	0	1	-1	1
Algeria	2	0	1	1	0	1	-1	1

Morocco	0–0	Algeria

Mali	1–0	Algeria

Mali	1–0	Morocco

== Knockout stage ==
=== Fifth-place match ===
Algeria	3–0	Bahrain

=== Third-place match ===
Guinea	4–1	Morocco

=== Final ===
Mali	1–0	Tunisia

== Champions ==
2010 UNAF U-17 Tournament Winners

Mali
1st Title
