= Sports Center of FAR =

Sports center in Morocco

Centre sportif des FAR
- Interactive map of Centre sportif des FAR
- Address: maâmoura B.P 794 Salé
- Location: Salé, Morocco
- Coordinates: 34.03896633°N 6.72566968°W
- Owner: ASFAR
- Type: Training ground

Construction
- Built: 1999
- Expanded: 2015-2017, 2024-2025

Website
- as-far.ma

Centre sportif des FAR (English: Sports centre of F.A.R) (Arabic: المركز الرياضي لنادي الجيش الملكي) is based in the city of Salé, adjoining the city of Rabat. This is the sports centre of the club of ASFAR.

The construction of the sports center, covering a total area of 40 hectares, was entrusted to Cater, and completed in 1999. In 2017, the facilities of the old football training center, situated north of the center, were expanded with the establishment of a modern football academy, includes training fields, a school, and on-site accommodations.

== Description ==
=== Sport centre ===
The sports center of ASFAR extends over an area of 40 hectares, and is a comprehensive sports center for many sports. It includes a main Olympic stadium for football in natural grass, with a side amphitheater with a capacity of 600 seats, a warehouse and a dispensary, another stadium with natural grass with FIFA standards, a rectangular area for training also with natural grass, and then an administrative unit with a club museum, a hall and a cafe for the first team. The north of the center was dedicated to the ASFAR Football Academy

There is a section called the sports group for collective games in the form of tents and includes a group of sports facilities from a large covered multi-sport hall for volleyball, basketball and handball branches with a capacity of 644 seats, two Olympic swimming pools, a boxing hall, two gymnastics and wrestling halls, a taekwondo hall and another for judo, and then a strengthening hall Muscles, a tennis court with a dirt floor, a mosque, a garage, and a section of residence for a group of residences.

The sports center also has a "sports medical center" that has a heart detection unit with advanced technologies. The medical center also includes a traditional radiology and ultrasound unit, a dental surgery unit, a functional rehabilitation unit, a hydrotherapy unit (Jacuzzi and sauna), and a hall dedicated to medical dressage. And physiotherapy room, massage room, electrophoresis room and recovery room. With a medical team consisting of six sports doctors, a dentist and physiotherapists in addition to qualified trainers.

=== ASFAR Football Academy ===
ASFAR Football Academy (French: ASFAR Académie de football), is a training center for football players and also includes handball and basketball players. The area of the academy is divided into two parts, with a total area of 12 hectares, parallel to the sports center of FAR in the north. It includes dozens of players who benefit from a study and sports program starting from 6 years.

The ASFAR Football Academy includes modern facilities, featuring a natural grass pitch and three artificial turf pitches designated for training and matches, in addition to two small technical training fields, a fully equipped fitness hall, and two courts for handball and basketball. The academy also houses a school equipped with advanced audiovisual systems, a lecture hall, and a center for seminars and training, as well as a hotel unit for players, a restaurant with a private kitchen, and a medical clinic for treatment and rehabilitation. The facilities further include administrative and technical sections to manage organizational and sporting affairs, along with a sports shop and a cafeteria for visitors.

In addition, ASFAR Club owns a group of other football schools in several neighborhoods of the capital, Rabat, especially in the neighborhood of Yacoub Al-Mansour, Al-Najah and the Hilton Forest in the center of the capital, and then the extension of the Prince Moulay Abdellah Stadium.

== Administration ==
position	Occupancy
Sports center manager	(Morocco) Mouhcin Boutaka
football academy manager	(Morocco) Hassan Malik
Technical manager	(France) (Portugal) Fernando da Cruz
educational manager	(Morocco) Othman Ibrahimi

== Events ==
- ASFAR Football Academy hosted the matches of the men's football teams in the 2019 African Games, which was held in Morocco.
