= Mauritania national under-17 football team =

National under-17 association football team representing Mauritania

Mauritania U-17
- Nickname(s): Al-Murabitun (الْمُرَابِطُون); Lions of Chinguetti
- Association: Football Federation of the Islamic Republic of Mauritania
- Confederation: CAF (Africa)
- Sub-confederation: WAFU (West Africa)
- Home stadium: Stade Olympique
- FIFA code: MTN
First colours	Second colours

U-17 Africa Cup of Nations
- Appearances: None

FIFA U-17 World Cup
- Appearances: None

The Mauritania national under-17 football team (Arabic: منتخب موريتانيا لكرة القدم تحت 17 سنة) is the national representative for Mauritania in international under-17 football competition, and is controlled by the Football Federation of the Islamic Republic of Mauritania. The team competes in the Africa U-17 Cup of Nations, WAFU Zone A U-17 Tournament, and the FIFA U-17 World Cup, which is held every two years. The under-17 team also participates in local and international friendly tournaments.

== Competitive record ==
=== FIFA U-16 and U-17 World Cup record ===
FIFA U-16 and U-17 World Cup
Year	Round	GP	W	D^{1}	L	GS	GA
(China) 1985	Did not enter						
(Canada) 1987	Did not enter						
(Scotland) 1989	Did not enter						
(Italy) 1991	Did not qualify						
(Japan) 1993	Withdrew in qualification						
(Ecuador) 1995	Did not enter						
(Egypt) 1997	Did not enter						
(New Zealand) 1999	Withdrew in qualification						
(Trinidad and Tobago) 2001	Did not enter						
(Finland) 2003	Withdrew in qualification						
(Peru) 2005	Did not enter						
(South Korea) 2007	Did not qualify						
(Nigeria) 2009	Did not qualify						
(Mexico) 2011	Did not enter						
(United Arab Emirates) 2013	Did not qualify						
(Chile) 2015	Withdrew in qualification						
(India) 2017	Did not qualify						
(Brazil) 2019	Did not qualify						
(Peru) 2023	Did not qualify						
(Qatar) 2025	Did not qualify						
Total	0/20	0	0	0	0	0	0

=== U-17 Africa Cup of Nations record ===
U-17 Africa Cup of Nations
Year	Round	GP	W	D^{1}	L	GS	GA
(Mali) 1995	Did not enter						
(Botswana) 1997	Did not enter						
(Guinea) 1999	Withdrew in qualification						
(Seychelles) 2001	Did not enter						
(Eswatini) 2003	Withdrew in qualification						
(The Gambia) 2005	Did not enter						
(Togo) 2007	Did not qualify						
(Algeria) 2009	Did not qualify						
(Rwanda) 2011	Did not enter						
(Morocco) 2013	Did not qualify						
(Niger) 2015	Withdrew in qualification						
(Gabon) 2017	Did not qualify						
(Tanzania) 2019	Did not qualify						
(Algeria) 2023	Did not qualify						
(Morocco) 2025	Did not qualify						
Total	0/15	0	0	0	0	0	0

=== Arab Cup U-17 record ===
Arab Cup U-17
Appearances: 3
Year	Round	Position	Pld	W	D	L	GF	GA
(Saudi Arabia) 2011	Did not participate							
(Tunisia) 2012	Group stage	5th	3	1	1	1	5	5
(Qatar) 2014	Group stage	7th	2	0	0	2	4	7
(Morocco) 2021	Cancelled							
(Algeria) 2022	Qualified							
Total	Group stage	3/4	5	1	1	3	9	12

== See also ==
- Mauritania national football team
- Mauritania national under-23 football team
- Mauritania national under-20 football team
