= 1997 African U-17 Championship =

Tournament details
- Host country: Botswana
- City: Gaborone
- Dates: 11–24 May
- Teams: 8 (from 1 confederation)

Final positions
- Champions: Egypt (1st title)
- Runners-up: Mali
- Third place: Ghana
- Fourth place: Ethiopia

Tournament statistics
- Matches played: 16
- Goals scored: 46 (2.88 per match)

The 1997 African U-17 Championship was a football competition organized by the Confederation of African Football (CAF). The tournament took place in Botswana. It also served as CAF's qualifier for the 1997 FIFA U-17 World Championship in Egypt, who automatically qualified as host. As Egypt won this tournament, third placed-team Ghana qualified.

== Qualification ==
=== Qualified teams ===
- Angola
- Botswana (host nation)
- Ivory Coast
- Egypt
- Ethiopia
- Ghana
- Mali
- Zimbabwe

== Group stage ==
=== Group A ===
Pos	Team	Pld	W	D	L	GF	GA	GD	Pts	Qualification
1	Egypt	3	2	1	0	4	0	+4	7	Knockout stage
2	Mali	3	1	2	0	2	1	+1	5	Knockout stage
3	Ivory Coast	3	1	1	1	7	2	+5	4	
4	Botswana (H)	3	0	0	3	1	11	−10	0	

Rules for classification: Group stage tiebreakers
(H) Hosts
11 May 1997

Botswana	0 – 2	Egypt

National Stadium, Gaborone

11 May 1997

Ivory Coast	0 – 0	Mali

National Stadium, Gaborone

14 May 1997

Egypt	0 – 0	Mali

National Stadium, Gaborone

14 May 1997

Botswana	0 – 7	Ivory Coast

National Stadium, Gaborone

17 May 1997

Egypt	2 – 0	Ivory Coast

National Stadium, Gaborone

17 May 1997

Botswana	1 – 2	Mali

National Stadium, Gaborone

=== Group B ===
Pos	Team	Pld	W	D	L	GF	GA	GD	Pts	Qualification
1	Ghana	3	2	0	1	7	4	+3	6	Knockout stage
2	Ethiopia	3	2	0	1	10	8	+2	6	Knockout stage
3	Angola	3	1	1	1	7	6	+1	4	
4	Zimbabwe	3	0	1	2	2	8	−6	1	

Rules for classification: Group stage tiebreakers
12 May 1997

Ghana	4 – 1	Ethiopia

National Stadium, Gaborone

12 May 1997

Zimbabwe	1 – 1	Angola

National Stadium, Gaborone

15 May 1997

Ethiopia	4 – 3	Angola

National Stadium, Gaborone

15 May 1997

Ghana	2 – 0	Zimbabwe

National Stadium, Gaborone

17 May 1997

Ethiopia	5 – 1	Zimbabwe

National Stadium, Gaborone

17 May 1997

Angola	3 – 1	Ghana

National Stadium, Gaborone

== Knock-out stage ==
Semi-finals
May 21 - Gaborone
Egypt	1
Ethiopia	0
May 21 - Gaborone
Ghana	1
Mali	2

Final
May 24 - Gaborone
Egypt	1
Mali	0
Third place
May 24 - Gaborone
Ethiopia	0
Ghana	1

=== Semi-finals ===
21 May 1997

Egypt	1–0	Ethiopia

National Stadium, Gaborone

21 May 1997

Ghana	1–2	Mali

National Stadium, Gaborone

For winning their semi-final, Mali qualified for the 1997 FIFA U-17 World Championship

=== Third place match ===
24 May 1997

Ethiopia	0–1	Ghana

National Stadium, Gaborone

For winning the third place match, Ghana qualified for the 1997 FIFA U-17 World Championship with Ethiopia missing out.

=== Final ===
24 May 1997

Egypt	1–0	Mali

National Stadium, Gaborone

== Winners ==
1997 CAF Under-17 Championship
(Egypt)
Egypt
First title

== Countries to participate in 1997 FIFA U-17 World Championship ==
The 3 teams which qualified for 1997 FIFA U-17 World Championship.

- Mali
- Ghana
- Egypt (qualified as host)
