= Royal Moroccan Football Federation =

Sport governing body

CAF
- Short name: FRMF
- Founded: 26 January 1957; 69 years ago
- Headquarters: Rabat
- FIFA affiliation: 1960
- CAF affiliation: 1960
- UNAF affiliation: 2005
- President: Fouzi Lekjaa
- Website: www.frmf.ma

The Royal Moroccan Football Federation (abbr. FRMF; Arabic: الجامعة الملكية المغربية لكرة القدم; Standard Moroccan Tamazight: ⵜⴰⵙⴷⴰⵡⵉⵜ ⵜⴰⴳⵍⴷⴰⵏⵜ ⵜⴰⵎⵖⵔⴰⴱⵉⵜ ⵏ ⵜⵡⵊⵊⴰ ⵏ ⵓⴹⴰⵕ; French: Fédération Royale Marocaine de Football) is the governing body for association football in Morocco. Founded in 1956, it joined FIFA in 1960 and became a member of CAF the same year. The federation administers the national football league system and oversees its top division, the Botola Pro. It is also responsible for the Morocco national football teams across all age categories and disciplines. Headquartered in Rabat, the FRMF is a member of the UAFA and the UNAF.

== History ==
=== Africa Cup of Nations ===
On 29 January 2011, the CAF Board decided that Morocco would host the 2015 Africa Cup of Nations, while the 2017 edition would be held in South Africa.

In October 2014, the government of Morocco requested a postponement of the tournament due to the Ebola virus epidemic in West Africa. After the matter was discussed at the executive committee meeting on 2 November 2014, CAF decided to keep the date of the tournament, while also asking for a clarification from the Royal Moroccan Football Federation of whether they still wish to host the tournament. On 8 November, Morocco failed to meet this deadline to confirm it would host the tournament. Three days later CAF confirmed that Morocco would not host the tournament and a new host would be chosen from a list of countries which have expressed interest. Morocco, who had previously qualified as hosts, were disqualified from participation at the tournament.

On 1 October 2022, Morocco announced its willingness to host the 2025 Africa Cup of Nations, after it was stripped from Guinea. On 27 September 2023, CAF announced that Morocco will host the 35th edition of the TotalEnergies CAF Africa Cup of Nations 2025.

=== Women's Africa Cup of Nations ===
On 15 January 2021, Morocco was announced as hosts for the 2022 Women's Africa Cup of Nations. This is the first time a North African Arab country has hosted the Women's Africa Cup of Nations. After a successful event, Morocco was given the right to host the 2024 Women's Africa Cup of Nations.

=== FIFA World Cup Bids ===
In 1994, Morocco, United States and Brazil bade to host the 1994 FIFA World Cup. The United States eventually won the bid with 10 votes, Morocco in second place with 7 votes and Brazil with 2. Morocco was set to bid on the upcoming 1998 FIFA World Cup. It ended with 12–7 vote for France allowing France to be host of the 16th edition of the FIFA World Cup.

In 2006, Morocco made their third bid to host the FIFA World Cup. Germany was successful in winning the vote to host the 2006 FIFA World Cup. Morocco continued its attempt to host the next FIFA World Cup edition but failed in doing so. South Africa won the bid making it the first African country to host the World Cup. On 6 June 2015, The Daily Telegraph reported that Morocco had actually won the vote, but South Africa was awarded the tournament instead.

==== 2026 FIFA World Cup ====
On 11 August 2017, Morocco was set for submission of an intention to bid, and on that day, the Royal Moroccan Football Federation announced that it would submit a bid for the 2026 FIFA World Cup. In March 2018, the Morocco 2026 bid committee stated their plan to spend $16 billion on preparing for the tournament, including building new transportation infrastructure, 21 new hospitals, a large number of new hotels and leisure facilities and building and/or renovating new stadiums.

==== 2030 FIFA World Cup ====
The national football association of Morocco bid to host the 2030 FIFA World Cup. On 15 June 2018, the bid was led by the Royal Moroccan Football Federation, who officially confirmed it.

On 25 July 2018, Royal Moroccan Football Federation president Fouzi Lekjaa, confirmed Morocco would apply for the 2030 World Cup bid. On 10 March 2023, the Royal Spanish Football Federation and the Portuguese Football Federation announced they were studying the possibility of adding Morocco to their Iberian Bid to host the 2030 World Cup, replacing Ukraine.

On 4 October 2023, the FIFA Executive Committee unanimously accepted the Morocco–Spain–Portugal bid as a candidate to host the 2030 World Cup. King Mohammed VI appointed Lekjaa as the chairman of the 2030 World Cup committee.

== Record of the Moroccan national team ==
=== Men ===
- World Cup
  - 7 participations: 1970, 1986, 1994 1998, 2018, 2022, 2026
  - Best result: 4th Place (2022)
- Africa Cup of Nations
  - Champions: 1976, 2025
  - 2nd place: 2004
  - 3rd place: 1980
  - 4th place: 1986, 1988
- African Nations Championship
  - Champions: 2018, 2020, 2024
- Arab Cup
  - Champions: 2012, 2025

=== Women ===
- Women's World Cup
  - 1 participation: 2023
  - Best result: Round of 16 (2023)
- Women's Africa Cup of Nations
  - 2nd place: 2022, 2024

== Youth and Olympic teams ==
- Africa U-23 Cup of Nations
  - Champions: 2023
- Olympic Games
  - Bronze: 2024
- FIFA U-20 World Cup
  - Champions: 2025
- Africa U-20 Cup of Nations
  - Champions: 1997
- Africa U-17 Cup of Nations
  - Champions: 2025
- UNAF U-20 Tournament
  - Champions: 2015, 2020, 2024
- UNAF U-20 Women's Tournament
  - Champions: 2019, 2023, 2025
- Arab Cup U-20
  - Champions: 1989, 2011
- Mediterranean Games
  - Champions: 1983, 2013
- Jeux de la Francophonie
  - Champions: 2001, 2017
- Islamic Solidarity Games
  - Champions: 2013
- Pan Arab Games
  - Champions: 1961, 1985
- UNAF U-17 Tournament
  - Champions: 2007, 2011, 2018, 2022

== Presidents ==
Rang	Nom	Période
1	(Morocco) Ahmed Lyazidi	1956-1957
2	(Morocco) Omar Boucetta	1957-1962
3	(Morocco) Driss Slaoui	1962-1966
4	(Morocco) Majid Benjelloun	1966-1969
5	(Morocco) Maâti Jorio	1969-1970
6	(Morocco) Badreddine Snoussi	1970-1971
7	(Morocco) Arsalane Jadidi	1971-1974
8	(Morocco) Othman Slimani	1974-1978
9	(Morocco) Colonel Mehdi Belmejdoub	1978-1979
10	(Morocco) Fadoul Benzeroual	1979-1986
11	(Morocco) Colonel Driss Bamous	1986-1992
12	(Morocco) Colonel Major Houssaine Zemmouri	1992-1995
13	(Morocco) Général Hosni Benslimane	1995-2009
14	(Morocco) Ali Fassi-Fihri	2009-2013
15	(Morocco) Fouzi Lekjaa	depuis 2014 (reconduit en 2022)

== General Secretaries ==
Rang	Nom	Période
1	(Morocco) Sitel Aïssaoui	1956-1957
2	(Morocco) Ahmed Antifit	1957-1970
3	(Morocco) Hammou Tahra Jelloul	1970-1971
4	(Morocco) Colonel Mehdi Belmejdoub	1971-1977
5	(Morocco) Alaoui	1977-1978
6	(Morocco) Mohamed Hourane	1978-1986
7	(Morocco) Mohamed Doumou	1986-1992
-	(Morocco) Mohamed Hourane	1992-1994
8	(Morocco) Mohamed Lamrani	1995-1999
9	(Morocco) Karim El Alem	1999-2001
10	(Morocco) Mohamed Moufid	2002-2004
11	(Morocco) Ahmed Ammor	2004-2006
12	(Morocco) Larbi Bencheikh	2006-2008
13	(Morocco) Khalid Laâraïchi	2009-2011
14	(Morocco) Tarek Najem	2012-2025
