= 2025 U-17 Africa Cup of Nations squads =

Teams competing in the 2025 U-17 Africa Cup of Nations

The 2025 Africa U-17 Cup of Nations is an international age-restricted football tournament which is currently being held in Morocco from 31 March to 19 April.

The 16 national teams involved in the tournament were required to register a squad of 21 players with an option of up to 5 more additional players, including three goalkeepers. Only players born on or after 1 January 2008 are eligible to be registered in these squads, only players registered in the squads are eligible to take part in the tournament.

== Group A ==
=== Morocco ===
Head Coach: Nabil Baha

No.	Pos.	Player	Date of birth (age)	Club
1	GK	Chouaib Bellaarouch	10 February 2008 (aged 17)	(Royal Moroccan Football Federation) Mohammed VI Football Academy
2	DF	Hamza Bouhadi	7 October 2008 (aged 16)	(Royal Moroccan Football Federation) FUS Rabat
3	DF	Ilyas El Arbaoui	4 May 2008 (aged 16)	(Royal Spanish Football Federation) Athletic Club
4	DF	Joseph Bellahsen	28 December 2008 (aged 16)	(German Football Association) Borussia Mönchengladbach
5	DF	Nassim El Massoudi	19 February 2008 (aged 17)	(German Football Association) Bayer 04 Leverkusen
6	MF	Elyes Saïdi	15 December 2008 (aged 16)	(French Football Federation) Auxerre
7	FW	Ibrahim Rabbaj	15 October 2009 (aged 15)	(The Football Association) Chelsea
8	MF	Abdellah Ouazane	15 January 2009 (aged 16)	(Royal Dutch Football Association) Ajax FC
9	FW	Ziyad Baha	10 August 2009 (aged 15)	(Royal Spanish Football Federation) Real Betis
10	MF	Amine Ouahabi	4 July 2008 (aged 16)	(Royal Belgian Football Association) KV Mechelen
11	FW	Ilies Belmokhtar	12 May 2008 (aged 16)	(French Football Federation) AS Monaco
12	GK	Yassine Laghirisi	24 February 2008 (aged 17)	(French Football Federation) FC Rouen
13	DF	Driss Ait Cheikh	17 July 2008 (aged 16)	(Royal Moroccan Football Federation) Chippo Football Club
14	DF	Ilyas Hidaoui	13 April 2008 (aged 16)	(Royal Moroccan Football Federation) Mohammed VI Football Academy
15	DF	Ahmed Mouhoub	4 January 2008 (aged 17)	(Royal Moroccan Football Federation) FUS Rabat
16	MF	Adam Soudi	18 March 2009 (aged 16)	(French Football Federation) Toulouse FC
17	FW	Adam Jout	23 January 2008 (aged 17)	(Royal Moroccan Football Federation) Mohammed VI Football Academy
18	FW	Zakari El Khalfioui	27 February 2008 (aged 17)	(French Football Federation) Ajaccio
19	FW	Alí El Failali	12 June 2008 (aged 16)	(Royal Spanish Football Federation) Málaga
20	MF	Ismail El Aoud	1 July 2009 (aged 15)	(Royal Spanish Football Federation) Valencia
21	DF	Adam Alioui	29 June 2009 (aged 15)	(French Football Federation) Lyon
22	GK	Soufiane Elidrisi	22 February 2008 (aged 17)	(Royal Moroccan Football Federation) Mohammed VI Football Academy
23	DF	Moncef Zekri	20 September 2008 (aged 16)	(Royal Belgian Football Association) KV Mechelen
24	MF	Luis Velilles	28 April 2009 (aged 15)	(Royal Spanish Football Federation) Real Betis
25	MF	Amine Amgar	13 October 2008 (aged 16)	(Royal Dutch Football Association) MVV Maastricht
26	MF	Mohamed Mounssef	12 June 2008 (aged 16)	(Royal Moroccan Football Federation) Wydad AC

=== Uganda ===
Head Coach:Brian Ssenyondo

No.	Pos.	Player	Date of birth (age)	Club
1	GK	Adrian Mukwanga	25 May 2010 (aged 14)	(Federation of Uganda Football Associations) Vipers SC
2	DF	Jovan Mukisa	29 May 2009 (aged 15)	(Federation of Uganda Football Associations) NEC FC
3	DF	Hamuza Sengooba	2 February 2008 (aged 17)	(Federation of Uganda Football Associations) Masaka Sunshine FC
4	MF	Ethan Oyedele	9 July 2008 (aged 16)	(The Football Association) Bradfield College
5	MF	Joseph Lamgol	1 November 2009 (aged 15)	(Federation of Uganda Football Associations) Paorhinar Soccer Academy
6	DF	Elvis Torach	25 February 2008 (aged 17)	(Federation of Uganda Football Associations) Masaka Sunshine FC
7	MF	Derick Szozi	1 June 2008 (aged 16)	(Federation of Uganda Football Associations) Fort Portal Tax Operators FC
8	MF	Thomas Ogema	27 May 2009 (aged 15)	(Federation of Uganda Football Associations) KCC FC
9	FW	James Bogere	2 February 2008 (aged 17)	(Federation of Uganda Football Associations) Masaka Sunshine FC
10	MF	Isma Mangala	28 July 2009 (aged 15)	(Federation of Uganda Football Associations) Masaka Sunshine FC
11	FW	Richard Okello	27 March 2008 (aged 17)	(Federation of Uganda Football Associations) Bul FC
12	DF	Steven Oyirwoth	24 September 2009 (aged 15)	(Federation of Uganda Football Associations) KCC FC
13	DF	Trabor Mubiru	15 July 2010 (aged 14)	(Federation of Uganda Football Associations) Vipers SC
14	FW	Simon Wanyama	20 December 2009 (aged 15)	(Federation of Uganda Football Associations) Bukedea Comephensive
15	FW	Shakur Magogo	15 December 2008 (aged 16)	(Federation of Uganda Football Associations) Mamilyango College
16	DF	John Owino	5 June 2009 (aged 15)	(Federation of Uganda Football Associations) Express FC
17	MF	Marvin Kabito	3 December 2008 (aged 16)	(Federation of Uganda Football Associations) Vipers SC
18	GK	Muhamad Masabo	10 December 2010 (aged 14)	(Federation of Uganda Football Associations) Lugazi FC
19	GK	Archaf Lukyamuzi	25 December 2009 (aged 15)	(Federation of Uganda Football Associations) KCCA FC
20	MF	Ashraf Kyakuwa	10 June 2010 (aged 14)	(Federation of Uganda Football Associations) Vispers SC
21	FW	Abdul Ntege	1 January 2010 (aged 15)	(Federation of Uganda Football Associations) Maroons FC

=== Tanzania ===
Head Coach: Aggrey Morris

No.	Pos.	Player	Date of birth (age)	Club
1	GK	Abrahman Nassoro	21 June 2009 (aged 15)	(Tanzania Football Federation) None
2	DF	Athumani Athumani	12 November 2008 (aged 16)	(Tanzania Football Federation) Coastal Union FC
3	DF	Kassim Juna	20 June 2006 (aged 18)	(Tanzania Football Federation) Karume Youth
4	DF	Abdulnassir Makarani	29 March 2009 (aged 16)	(Tanzania Football Federation) Milandege FC
5	DF	Hussein Mbegu	11 June 2010 (aged 14)	(Tanzania Football Federation) Simba FC
6	MF	Akram Shaaban	13 July 2009 (aged 15)	(Tanzania Football Federation) JKU Academy
7	FW	Ramadhani Kambangwa	12 November 2008 (aged 16)	(Tanzania Football Federation) Yanga SC
8	MF	Issa Chole	5 May 2010 (aged 14)	(Tanzania Football Federation) Tabora United FC
9	FW	Juma Sagwe	7 September 2009 (aged 15)	(Tanzania Football Federation) KMC FC
10	MF	Juma Abushiri	20 May 2008 (aged 16)	(Tanzania Football Federation) Fountain Gate SC
11	MF	Razaki Mbelegendi	7 July 2009 (aged 15)	(Tanzania Football Federation) Kilombero SNA
12	DF	Elick Yusuph	15 November 2010 (aged 14)	(Tanzania Football Federation) Shadow FC
14	DF	Idrisa Kilendemo	25 May 2009 (aged 15)	(Tanzania Football Federation) Kilombero SNA
15	DF	Khamis Mbarouk	12 February 2010 (aged 15)	(Tanzania Football Federation) JKU Academy
16	MF	Ismail Likungilo	17 January 2010 (aged 15)	(Tanzania Football Federation) Azam FC
17	FW	Jabiri Fabijala	17 January 2010 (aged 15)	(Tanzania Football Federation) KMC FC
18	FW	Saleh Ally	19 November 2008 (aged 16)	(Tanzania Football Federation) Tabora United FC
20	MF	Hazan Kizinga	30 December 2009 (aged 15)	(Tanzania Football Federation) Yanga SC
21	MF	Hansgally Lipumula	11 July 2009 (aged 15)	(Tanzania Football Federation) Fountain Gate SC
22	GK	Ahmedi Juma	10 May 2010 (aged 14)	(Tanzania Football Federation) Azam FC
26	FW	Abel Josiah Samson	4 November 2010 (aged 14)	(Tanzania Football Federation) Fair Play Academy

=== Zambia ===
Head Coach: Ian Bakala

No.	Pos.	Player	Date of birth (age)	Club
1	GK	William Zulu	8 February 2010 (aged 15)	(Football Association of Zambia) Blaze Sporting Academy
2	DF	George Mwale	20 March 2009 (aged 16)	(Football Association of Zambia) Young Crocs
3	DF	Andrew Mwape	20 August 2008 (aged 16)	(Football Association of Zambia) Young Zanaco
4	FW	Chama Chansa	27 March 2009 (aged 16)	(Football Association of Zambia) Young Zanaco
5	MF	Gabriel Phiri	7 August 2008 (aged 16)	(Football Association of Zambia) Napsa Stars
6	MF	Bongani Ndhlovu	24 October 2008 (aged 16)	(Football Association of Zambia) Young Zanaco
7	FW	Robert Banda	26 May 2008 (aged 16)	(Football Association of Zambia) Athletico Lusaka FC
8	MF	Steven Lungu	22 June 2010 (aged 14)	(Football Association of Zambia) Morkved Sports Club
9	FW	Abel Nyongo	5 September 2008 (aged 16)	(Football Association of Zambia) Athletico Lusaka FC
10	MF	Nthasilwe Malupande	15 November 2009 (aged 15)	(Football Association of Zambia) Young Crocs
11	MF	James Sibeene	25 April 2008 (aged 16)	(Football Association of Zambia) Lusaka Sports Academy
12	DF	Vicent Mutondo	5 February 2008 (aged 17)	(Football Association of Zambia) Central City
13	FW	Daniel Silubonde	16 July 2008 (aged 16)	(Football Association of Zambia) Morkved Sports Club
14	DF	Saviour Mwansa	19 April 2008 (aged 16)	(Football Association of Zambia) Young Crocs
15	MF	Nkotami Chmwemwe	14 February 2008 (aged 17)	(Football Association of Zambia) Mpongwe United
16	GK	Rogers Simumba	1 August 2008 (aged 16)	(Football Association of Zambia) Shamuel Soccer Academy
17	FW	Mapalo Simute	19 March 2009 (aged 16)	(Football Association of Zambia) Mkushi Rising Stars
18	GK	Christo Chitambala	15 September 2009 (aged 15)	(Football Association of Zambia) Eromac FC
19	DF	Billy Daka	31 December 2008 (aged 16)	(Football Association of Zambia) Nkwazi FC
20	DF	Jonathan Kalimina	24 November 2008 (aged 16)	(Football Association of Zambia) Kafue Celtic
21	FW	Mike Mutale	14 May 2008 (aged 16)	(Football Association of Zambia) Makeni All Stars
22	MF	Kelvin Mulenga	1 January 2009 (aged 16)	(Football Association of Zambia) Forest Rangers
23	MF	Joseph Zulu	2 March 2009 (aged 16)	(Football Association of Zambia) Nangweshi Pirates

== Group B ==
=== Burkina Faso ===
Head Coach: Oscar Barro

No.	Pos.	Player	Date of birth (age)	Club
1	GK	Soungalo Konaté	10 August 2008 (aged 16)	(Burkinabé Football Federation) Majestic
2	DF	Oumar Sanogo	7 April 2009 (aged 15)	(Burkinabé Football Federation) Rahimo
3	DF	Mikael Coulibaly	30 October 2008 (aged 16)	(Burkinabé Football Federation) Réal du Faso
4	DF	Issouf Dabo	26 May 2009 (aged 15)	(Burkinabé Football Federation) New Stars
5	DF	Fadil Barro	2 April 2008 (aged 16)	(Burkinabé Football Federation) Vitesse
6	MF	Mohamed Fofana	19 May 2008 (aged 16)	(Burkinabé Football Federation) New Stars
7	FW	Issouf Bara	8 April 2009 (aged 15)	(Burkinabé Football Federation) Rahimo
8	MF	Mohamed Sako	14 January 2009 (aged 16)	(Burkinabé Football Federation) Basga JO
9	MF	Halidou Diakité	19 June 2009 (aged 15)	(Burkinabé Football Federation) Champi
10	FW	Alassana Bagayogo	24 December 2008 (aged 16)	(Burkinabé Football Federation) AJEB
11	FW	Abdoulaye Diaby	20 October 2008 (aged 16)	(Burkinabé Football Federation) AD DUHA
12	MF	Gustavo Yaro	4 June 2008 (aged 16)	(Burkinabé Football Federation) AD DUHA
13	MF	Bilhack Konaté	12 August 2010 (aged 14)	(Burkinabé Football Federation) Basga JO
14	MF	Adesina Ramanou	9 March 2010 (aged 15)	(Burkinabé Football Federation) New Stars
15	MF	Kassoum Nana	4 November 2008 (aged 16)	(Burkinabé Football Federation) Basga JO
16	GK	Prince Ouédraogo	31 December 2009 (aged 15)	(Burkinabé Football Federation) Réal du Faso
17	DF	Comi Ouattara	19 October 2010 (aged 14)	(Burkinabé Football Federation) Rahimo
18	DF	Ali Koné	28 April 2009 (aged 15)	(Burkinabé Football Federation) New Stars
19	FW	Asharaf Tapsoba	30 March 2010 (aged 15)	(Burkinabé Football Federation) Réal du Faso
20	MF	Assifou Koné	31 December 2009 (aged 15)	(Burkinabé Football Federation) Sporting
21	DF	Adriana Dambre	12 November 2010 (aged 14)	(Qatar Football Association) Al-Sadd
22	DF	Abdoul Ouédraogo	31 December 2009 (aged 15)	(Burkinabé Football Federation) USO
23	GK	Alassane Traoré	26 June 2010 (aged 14)	(Burkinabé Football Federation) Rahimo

=== Cameroon ===
Head Coach: Alioum Saidou

No.	Pos.	Player	Date of birth (age)	Club
1	GK	Junior Abou	23 September 2008 (aged 16)	(Cameroonian Football Federation) Fondation Tafi
2	DF	Marc Yoss	10 March 2008 (aged 17)	
3	DF	Oscar Eyen	1 September 2008 (aged 16)	
4	DF	Chris Pondy	16 March 2008 (aged 17)	(Cameroonian Football Federation) Dauphine
5	DF	Dieu Avama	9 April 2009 (aged 15)	(Cameroonian Football Federation) Coton Sport
6	MF	David Mimbang	15 August 2008 (aged 16)	(Cameroonian Football Federation) Brasseries
7	FW	Franck Luma	8 October 2008 (aged 16)	(Cameroonian Football Federation) Best Stars
8	MF	Joël Biwole	14 September 2008 (aged 16)	(Cameroonian Football Federation) Dauphine
9	FW	André Emini Zibi	6 April 2008 (aged 16)	(Cameroonian Football Federation) Oyili
10	MF	David Bondoma	9 September 2009 (aged 15)	(Cameroonian Football Federation) Oyili
11	DF	Arnaud Tsombeng	15 June 2009 (aged 15)	(Cameroonian Football Federation) Player
12	MF	Noel Doumbogo	31 December 2008 (aged 16)	(Cameroonian Football Federation) Academy Foot
13	MF	Evan Edjoto	28 August 2008 (aged 16)	
14	DF	Leopold Bidichou	5 August 2008 (aged 16)	
15	MF	Ralph Fometesong	20 November 2008 (aged 16)	(Cameroonian Football Federation) Best Stars
16	GK	Tony Kemeye	3 May 2009 (aged 15)	
17	FW	Arnold Massokon	2 January 2010 (aged 15)	
18	DF	Georges Esingala	17 June 2009 (aged 15)	(Cameroonian Football Federation) Best Stars
19	FW	Oumar Tsombeng	20 September 2010 (aged 14)	(Cameroonian Football Federation) Player
20	FW	Jean Bebe	1 January 2008 (aged 17)	
21	FW	Abdoul Mbouombouo	6 June 2009 (aged 15)	
22	GK	Julliard Abeng Mefoe	31 July 2008 (aged 16)	(Cameroonian Football Federation) Colombe
23	FW	Fonda Moussongo	3 May 2009 (aged 15)	(Cameroonian Football Federation) Brasseries

=== South Africa ===
Head Coach: Vela Khumalo

No.	Pos.	Player	Date of birth (age)	Club
1	GK	Lwandiso Radebe	23 March 2009 (aged 16)	(South African Football Association) SuperSport United
2	DF	Bokamoso Mokokosi	11 April 2008 (aged 16)	(South African Football Association) Kaizer Chiefs
3	DF	Liam Marithinus	27 February 2008 (aged 17)	(South African Football Association) Mamelodi Sundowns
4	DF	Khayalethu Mzimela	7 January 2008 (aged 17)	(South African Football Association) Kaizer Chiefs
5	DF	Tumi Bowes	15 May 2008 (aged 16)	(South African Football Association) Orlando Pirates
6	MF	Kamohelo Maraletse	21 September 2008 (aged 16)	(South African Football Association) Mamelodi Sundowns
7	MF	Selwyn Stevens	15 February 2008 (aged 17)	(South African Football Association) Mamelodi Sundowns
8	MF	Teboho Mlangeni	21 September 2008 (aged 16)	(South African Football Association) Kaizer Chiefs
9	FW	Oageng Lebesane	17 October 2008 (aged 16)	(South African Football Association) Harmony Sports Academy
10	MF	Emile Witbooi	28 August 2008 (aged 16)	(South African Football Association) Cape Town City
11	MF	Simphiwe Mlondo	10 April 2008 (aged 16)	(South African Football Association) Mamelodi Sundowns
12	MF	Kgaogelo Monanyane	12 March 2008 (aged 17)	(South African Football Association) Mamelodi Sundowns
13	FW	Omphemetse Sekgoto	11 March 2010 (aged 15)	(South African Football Association) Mamelodi Sundowns
14	DF	Lebogang Mswane	21 March 2008 (aged 17)	(South African Football Association) Mamelodi Sundowns
15	DF	Abulele Dlekedla	15 July 2008 (aged 16)	(South African Football Association) Cape Town City
16	GK	Luke Holden	1 October 2008 (aged 16)	(South African Football Association) Mamelodi Sundowns
17	DF	Hayden Booysen	4 June 2009 (aged 15)	(South African Football Association) Ubuntu Cape Town
18	MF	Sive Pama	21 May 2008 (aged 16)	(South African Football Association) Kaizer Chiefs
19	FW	Neo Bohloko	1 April 2009 (aged 15)	(South African Football Association) Kaizer Chiefs
20	GK	Keabetswe Morake	19 January 2009 (aged 16)	(South African Football Association) Kaizer Chiefs
21	MF	Joshua Taylor	28 July 2008 (aged 16)	(South African Football Association) Cape Town City

=== Egypt ===
Head Coach: Ahmed El-Kass

No.	Pos.	Player	Date of birth (age)	Club
1	GK	Omar Abdelaziz	11 April 2008 (aged 16)	(Egyptian Football Association) Zamalek
2	FW	Youssef Wagih	2 July 2008 (aged 16)	(Portuguese Football Federation) Braga
3	DF	Nour Ashraf	17 May 2008 (aged 16)	(Egyptian Football Association) ENPPI
4	DF	Hamza El-Degawy	18 May 2008 (aged 16)	(Egyptian Football Association) Al-Ahly
5	DF	Mohanad El-Shamy	12 December 2008 (aged 16)	(Egyptian Football Association) Al-Ahly
6	DF	Adham Farid	31 December 2008 (aged 16)	(Egyptian Football Association) ENPPI
7	MF	Basel Medhat	17 August 2008 (aged 16)	(Egyptian Football Association) Smouha
8	MF	Mohamed Hamad	5 April 2008 (aged 16)	(Egyptian Football Association) Zamalek
9	FW	Hamza Abdelkarim	1 January 2008 (aged 17)	(Egyptian Football Association) Al-Ahly
10	MF	Belal Ateya	1 January 2008 (aged 17)	(Egyptian Football Association) Al-Ahly
12	DF	Adam Mohamed	1 May 2008 (aged 16)	(Egyptian Football Association) ENPPI
13	DF	Fares Fakhri	30 March 2008 (aged 17)	(Egyptian Football Association) ENPPI
14	MF	Omar El-Adawy	14 January 2008 (aged 17)	(Egyptian Football Association) Al-Ahly
15	MF	Mohamed Bendary	24 May 2008 (aged 16)	(Egyptian Football Association) ENPPI
16	GK	Amr Taha	2 July 2008 (aged 16)	(Egyptian Football Association) ZED
17	FW	Abdelaziz El-Zoghbi	20 January 2008 (aged 17)	(Egyptian Football Association) ENPPI
18	MF	Youssef Tamer	6 July 2008 (aged 16)	(Egyptian Football Association) ENPPI
19	FW	Ibrahim El-Nagaawy	23 August 2008 (aged 16)	(Egyptian Football Association) Ismaily
20	FW	Anas Roshdi	14 May 2008 (aged 16)	(Egyptian Football Association) ENPPI
21	DF	Moaz Mohamed	9 August 2008 (aged 16)	(Egyptian Football Association) Zamalek
22	MF	Ziad Ayoub	18 March 2008 (aged 17)	(Egyptian Football Association) Al-Ahly
23	GK	Yassin Hatem	29 March 2008 (aged 17)	(Egyptian Football Association) Al-Ahly
24	DF	Omar Kamal	14 January 2008 (aged 17)	(Egyptian Football Association) Al-Ahly
25	FW	Ahmed Ehab	1 January 2008 (aged 17)	(Egyptian Football Association) Smouha
26	FW	Omar Shaker	9 June 2008 (aged 16)	(Italian Football Federation) Pro Vercelli

== Group C ==
=== Senegal ===
Head coach: Ibrahima Faye

No.	Pos.	Player	Date of birth (age)	Club
1	GK	Mamadou Gueye	20 July 2009 (aged 15)	(Senegalese Football Federation) Diambars FC
2	DF	Lamine Mbengue	7 August 2009 (aged 15)	(Senegalese Football Federation) Génération Foot
3	DF	Ibrahima Aïdara	20 August 2008 (aged 16)	(Senegalese Football Federation) Diambars FC
4	DF	El Hadji Cissé	5 January 2008 (aged 17)	(Senegalese Football Federation) Sahel FC
5	DF	Cheikh Dieng	7 March 2009 (aged 16)	(Senegalese Football Federation) Diambars FC
6	MF	Maurice Biaye	14 January 2009 (aged 16)	(Senegalese Football Federation) AF Darou Salam
7	FW	Sidy Ndiaye	31 December 2009 (aged 15)	(Senegalese Football Federation) Diambars FC
8	MF	Ibrahima Sow	20 October 2008 (aged 16)	(Senegalese Football Federation) Génération Foot
9	FW	Abdourahmane Mbodj	22 April 2008 (aged 16)	(Senegalese Football Federation) Génération Foot
10	MF	El Hadji Sow	12 December 2009 (aged 15)	(Senegalese Football Federation) Dakar Sacré-Cœur
11	MF	Aliou Gueye	23 October 2009 (aged 15)	(Senegalese Football Federation) Espoirs Guédiawaye
12	FW	Ibrahima Diallo	20 October 2009 (aged 15)	(Senegalese Football Federation) AF Darou Salam
13	DF	Ahmadou Kane	7 November 2009 (aged 15)	(Senegalese Football Federation) Diambars FC
14	FW	Cheikhna Sané	3 January 2008 (aged 17)	(Senegalese Football Federation) Dakar Sacré-Cœur
15	MF	Ousseynou Ndiaye	11 October 2008 (aged 16)	(Senegalese Football Federation) United Academie
16	GK	Vincent Gomis	7 February 2008 (aged 17)	(Senegalese Football Federation) Génération Foot
17	FW	El Hadji Fall	23 August 2009 (aged 15)	(Senegalese Football Federation) Amitié FC
18	DF	Alpha Mbengue	9 May 2008 (aged 16)	(Senegalese Football Federation) Génération Foot
19	FW	Mbacke Ndiaye	20 December 2008 (aged 16)	(Senegalese Football Federation) AF Darou Salam
20	FW	Etienne Mendy	25 July 2008 (aged 16)	(Senegalese Football Federation) Diambars FC
21	GK	Assane Sarr	10 July 2010 (aged 14)	(Senegalese Football Federation) Ndangane FC
22	DF	Omar Cissé	22 November 2008 (aged 16)	(Senegalese Football Federation) AF Darou Salam
23	FW	Mouhamed Wagner	5 January 2009 (aged 16)	(Senegalese Football Federation) Diambars FC

=== Gambia ===
Head coach: Yahya Manneh

No.	Pos.	Player	Date of birth (age)	Club
1	GK	Mbemba Jammeh	2 May 2008 (aged 16)	(Gambia Football Federation) New Yundum UBS
2	DF	Kawsu Sanneh	25 August 2010 (aged 14)	(Gambia Football Federation) Presentation SS
3	DF	Muhammed Danso	23 April 2009 (aged 15)	(Gambia Football Federation) KGH Sports FA
4	DF	Abdou Mboob	4 October 2008 (aged 16)	(Gambia Football Federation) Yunus English School
5	DF	Yusupha Keita	18 January 2009 (aged 16)	(Gambia Football Federation) Latrikunda SSS
6	FW	Pa Omar Sarjo	25 October 2009 (aged 15)	(Gambia Football Federation) Esohna FA
7	FW	Alagie Baba Leigh	10 June 2009 (aged 15)	(Senegalese Football Federation) Étoile Lusitana
8	MF	Alh-Bubacarr Bah	16 February 2008 (aged 17)	(Senegalese Football Federation) Salam Academy
9	FW	Bubacarr Susso	7 January 2008 (aged 17)	(Gambia Football Federation) Tahirr SSS
10	FW	Alieu Drammeh	18 August 2009 (aged 15)	(Royal Spanish Football Federation) FC Barcelona
11	FW	Ismaila Sonko	30 November 2008 (aged 16)	(Gambia Football Federation) Nasirr SSS
12	FW	Sharif Touray	17 April 2010 (aged 14)	(Royal Dutch Football Association) Fortuna Sittard
13	DF	Abdou Wadou Sarr	18 February 2008 (aged 17)	(Gambia Football Federation) KGH Sports FA
14	MF	Sambujang Daffeh	28 August 2010 (aged 14)	(Gambia Football Federation) Farafenni SSS
15	MF	Omar Sanyang	7 June 2009 (aged 15)	(Gambia Football Federation) Gambinos Stars FA
16	FW	Ahmed Njundu Kanyi	21 December 2009 (aged 15)	(Nigeria Football Federation) Sporting Supreme FA
17	FW	Bisenty Mendy	7 March 2009 (aged 16)	(Gambia Football Federation) Kids with Talents FA
18	GK	Fallou Mbye	26 September 2010 (aged 14)	(Gambia Football Federation) St Joseph UBS
19	FW	Yankuba Touray	23 March 2010 (aged 15)	(Gambia Football Federation) TMT FA
20	FW	Bakary Jammeh	19 July 2009 (aged 15)	(Gambia Football Federation) Brikama UBS
21	MF	Kebba Camara	26 January 2008 (aged 17)	(Gambia Football Federation) Gambinos Stars FA
22	GK	Sebastian Haruna Darboe	17 December 2008 (aged 16)	(Norwegian Football Federation) Grorud IL
23	DF	Ebrima Jatta	3 September 2008 (aged 16)	(Gambia Football Federation) Esohna FA
24	MF	Alagie Colley	28 July 2009 (aged 15)	(Gambia Football Federation) Greater Banjul SSS

=== Somalia ===
Head coach: Mohamed Abdulkhadir Sheikhdon

No.	Pos.	Player	Date of birth (age)	Club
1	GK	Abdiasis Mohamud Ahmed	4 March 2008 (aged 17)	
2	DF	Anas Mohamed Abdi	12 November 2009 (aged 15)	
	DF	Mustafa Omar Hassan	14 July 2009 (aged 15)	
5	DF	Liban Kalif Mohamed	15 December 2010 (aged 14)	
6	MF	Abdikadir Hassan Tahlil	20 April 2009 (aged 15)	
7	MF	Khadar Abdi Ibrahim	14 October 2008 (aged 16)	
8	MF	Abdiqani Hussein Farah	10 September 2008 (aged 16)	
9	FW	Zakariya Yasin Osman	3 March 2010 (aged 15)	
10	FW	Anas Isse Mohamed	6 June 2009 (aged 15)	
11	FW	Mohamed Salad Ali	5 February 2009 (aged 16)	
12	GK	Abdulla Muse Weha	6 October 2009 (aged 15)	
13	DF	Adil Ahmed Nor	10 December 2008 (aged 16)	
14	FW	Sakariye Mohamud Mohamed	2 April 2008 (aged 16)	
15	DF	Bilal Fahad Alamoudi	3 January 2008 (aged 17)	
17	MF	Abas Ibrahim Nor	4 April 2009 (aged 15)	
18	MF	Abdiqani Abdullahi Said	2 August 2008 (aged 16)	
20	MF	Abdalla Osman Abdirahman	2 August 2009 (aged 15)	
21	GK	Ahmed Hussein Ahmed	29 November 2009 (aged 15)	
22	FW	Hussein Abdullahi Ali	25 December 2009 (aged 15)	
24	MF	Abdiasis Yusuf Abdi	31 January 2009 (aged 16)	
25	DF	Ashraf Mohamed Mohamud	5 February 2009 (aged 16)	
26	DF	Abdirahman Jama Elmi	3 June 2009 (aged 15)	

=== Tunisia ===
Head coach: Mohamed Amine Naffati

No.	Pos.	Player	Date of birth (age)	Club
1	GK	Youssef Oueslati	15 February 2008 (aged 17)	(Tunisian Football Federation) ES Sahel
2	DF	Kabil Krai	11 January 2008 (aged 17)	(French Football Federation) Nîmes Olympique
3	DF	Mehdi Tlili	1 December 2008 (aged 16)	(French Football Federation) AS Monaco FC (Note: Monaco is a Monégasque club playing in the French football league system)
4	DF	Mohamed Amine Ben Ali	25 January 2008 (aged 17)	(Tunisian Football Federation) Stade Tunisien
5	DF	Abdessalem Akid	25 January 2008 (aged 17)	(Tunisian Football Federation) CS Sfaxien
6	MF	Ilyes Dhaoui	15 April 2008 (aged 16)	(Tunisian Football Federation) Olympique Béja
7	FW	Fedi Tayechi	10 March 2008 (aged 17)	(Tunisian Football Federation) Club Africain
8	MF	Saïfedin Haj Abdallah	25 March 2008 (aged 17)	(Royal Belgian Football Association) K.V.C. Westerlo
9	FW	Anisse Saidi	20 June 2008 (aged 16)	(United States Soccer Federation) San Diego FC
10	MF	Mohamed Aziz Chaabane	10 October 2008 (aged 16)	(Tunisian Football Federation) CA Bizertin
11	FW	Wassim Tissa	5 June 2008 (aged 16)	(French Football Federation) FC Sochaux-Montbéliard
12	DF	Mohamed Aziz Hadroug	7 March 2008 (aged 17)	(Tunisian Football Federation) Club Africain
13	DF	Mohamed Khalil Daouas	24 March 2008 (aged 17)	(Tunisian Football Federation) ES Sahel
14	MF	Mohamed Mazen Slama Essefi	3 June 2008 (aged 16)	(Tunisian Football Federation) US Monastir
15	FW	Mohamed Edem Harabi	4 June 2008 (aged 16)	(Tunisian Football Federation) Stade Tunisien
16	GK	Slim Bouaskar	24 June 2009 (aged 15)	(Italian Football Federation) AS Roma
17	FW	Yessine Ben Mahmoud	21 January 2008 (aged 17)	(French Football Federation) Angers SCO
18	MF	Zinedine Hasni	22 April 2008 (aged 16)	(French Football Federation) OGC Nice
19	FW	Aman Allah Touati	8 March 2008 (aged 17)	(Tunisian Football Federation) ES Tunis
20	FW	Houssam Zaier	27 April 2008 (aged 16)	(Swiss Football Association) FC Zürich
21	FW	Mohamed Naceur Chefai	10 January 2008 (aged 17)	(Tunisian Football Federation) ES Tunis
22	GK	Iyed El Abed	6 September 2008 (aged 16)	(Tunisian Football Federation) CS Hammam-Lif
23	MF	Youssef Mokhtari	19 November 2008 (aged 16)	(Tunisian Football Federation) Club Africain
24	DF	Louay Ghodhbane	6 June 2008 (aged 16)	(Tunisian Football Federation) ES Sahel
25	DF	Ahmed Ben Yahya	25 January 2008 (aged 17)	(Tunisian Football Federation) ES Tunis
26	DF	Naïm Telmoudi	6 March 2008 (aged 17)	(French Football Federation) FC Nantes

== Group D ==
=== Mali ===
Head coach: Adama Djefla Diallo

No.	Pos.	Player	Date of birth (age)	Club
1	GK	Lamine Sinaba	5 April 2008 (aged 16)	(Malian Football Federation) Académie Cherifla
2	DF	Mahamadou Konaté	8 June 2009 (aged 15)	(Malian Football Federation) FC Diarra
3	MF	Ibrahim Diakite	10 July 2008 (aged 16)	(Malian Football Federation) JMG Academy
4	DF	Tièmoko Berthe	17 February 2008 (aged 17)	(Malian Football Federation) Étoiles du Mandé
5	DF	Aboubacar Siriki Camara	11 August 2010 (aged 14)	(Malian Football Federation) AFE
6	MF	Issa Tounkara	20 June 2008 (aged 16)	(Malian Football Federation) Étoiles du Mandé
7	FW	Soungalo Coulibaly	1 May 2008 (aged 16)	(Malian Football Federation) Yeelen Olympique
8	MF	Issa Koné	11 October 2008 (aged 16)	(Malian Football Federation) Africa Foot
9	FW	Ndjicoura Raymond Bomba	12 March 2008 (aged 17)	(Malian Football Federation) CSB
10	MF	Seydou Dembélé	16 February 2008 (aged 17)	(Malian Football Federation) JMG Academy
11	FW	Ousmane Savane	20 February 2008 (aged 17)	(Malian Football Federation) AS Bamako
12	DF	Souleymane Doumbia	27 February 2008 (aged 17)	(Malian Football Federation) Derby Académie
13	FW	Soumaila Fané	25 December 2009 (aged 15)	(Malian Football Federation) ASBD Sikasso
14	DF	Dramane Siaka Doumbia	12 August 2008 (aged 16)	(Malian Football Federation) Africa Foot
15	MF	Yaya Fofana	2 November 2008 (aged 16)	(Malian Football Federation) Africa Foot
16	GK	Ianis Sacko	30 July 2009 (aged 15)	(French Football Federation) US Quevilly RM
17	MF	Mahamadou Traoré	17 November 2009 (aged 15)	(Malian Football Federation) Players Dreams
18	DF	Mohamed Doumbia	15 December 2008 (aged 16)	(Malian Football Federation) Yeelen Olympique
19	FW	Mohamed Dhiarrah	18 November 2008 (aged 16)	(Malian Football Federation) Djoliba AC
20	DF	Lamine Sidiki Keita	20 November 2009 (aged 15)	(Malian Football Federation) ASBD Sikasso
21	GK	Mamadou Souleymane Sacko	16 September 2009 (aged 15)	(Malian Football Federation) ABM Foot
22	DF	Cheickna Hamala Coulibaly	25 January 2010 (aged 15)	(Malian Football Federation) Académie Cherifla
23	FW	Moussa Mamadou Djikine	5 February 2009 (aged 16)	(French Football Federation) FC Massy 91
24	GK	Cheick Oumar Diarra	19 October 2010 (aged 14)	(Malian Football Federation) FC Diarra

=== Angola ===
Head coach: Mitó

No.	Pos.	Player	Date of birth (age)	Club
1	GK	Rodrigo	11 January 2008 (aged 17)	(Portuguese Football Federation) Oriental de Lisboa
2	DF	Lourenço	28 June 2008 (aged 16)	(Angolan Football Federation) Petro de Luanda
3	DF	Marcos Raimundo	19 June 2008 (aged 16)	(Angolan Football Federation) AFA
4	DF	Ivan Manuel	16 October 2008 (aged 16)	(Angolan Football Federation) Nacional de Benguela
5	DF	Galinha	4 September 2008 (aged 16)	(Angolan Football Federation) Petro de Luanda
6	MF	Lucas	10 July 2008 (aged 16)	(Angolan Football Federation) AFA
7	FW	Edilásio	22 October 2009 (aged 15)	(Angolan Football Federation) Petro de Luanda
8	MF	Manelson	23 June 2009 (aged 15)	(Angolan Football Federation) AFA
9	FW	Hugo Luvumbo	28 October 2009 (aged 15)	(Angolan Football Federation) G.D. Interclube
10	MF	Densel	17 January 2008 (aged 17)	(Portuguese Football Federation) Real S.C.
11	MF	Omar Oliveira	11 April 2008 (aged 16)	(Angolan Football Federation) AFA
12	GK	Gelson Dala	22 September 2009 (aged 15)	(Angolan Football Federation) Petro de Luanda
13	FW	Luís Rasgado	14 May 2008 (aged 16)	(Portuguese Football Federation) Rio Ave F.C.
14	MF	Jairo	15 March 2009 (aged 16)	(Angolan Football Federation) AFA
15	DF	Josemar	26 November 2008 (aged 16)	(Angolan Football Federation) Petro de Luanda
16	DF	Jayden	29 February 2008 (aged 17)	(United States Soccer Federation) Houston Dynamo FC
17	FW	Kalanguinha	11 July 2009 (aged 15)	(Angolan Football Federation) Petro de Luanda
18	FW	Eliseu Francisco	7 February 2009 (aged 16)	(Angolan Football Federation) 1° Agosto
19	FW	Ayase Miguel	26 February 2008 (aged 17)	(Portuguese Football Federation) C.F. Os Belenenses
20	MF	Athos	9 February 2008 (aged 17)	(Portuguese Football Federation) F.C. Famalicão
21	MF	Flávio Faustino	5 March 2008 (aged 17)	(Portuguese Football Federation) Rio Ave F.C.
22	GK	Luis Alberto	22 July 2008 (aged 16)	(Portuguese Football Federation) Vitória S.C.
23	FW	Ginima	8 October 2010 (aged 14)	(Angolan Football Federation) 1° Agosto

=== Côte d'Ivoire ===
Head coach: Bassiriki Diabaté

No.	Pos.	Player	Date of birth (age)	Club
1	GK	Christ Yannick Kouassi	8 October 2008 (aged 16)	(Ivorian Football Federation) OFC Adiaké
2	DF	Mobio Loba Edmond Franck Koidio	24 March 2008 (aged 17)	(Ivorian Football Federation) FC San Pédro
3	DF	Vasseri Sylla	16 April 2008 (aged 16)	(Ivorian Football Federation) 2 Plateaux FC
5	DF	Obli Kouamé Jean Mederic	20 December 2008 (aged 16)	(Ivorian Football Federation) FC Mouna
6	MF	Kambou Aboubacar Sidik Fofana	15 July 2008 (aged 16)	(Ivorian Football Federation) 2 Plateaux FC
7	FW	Souhalio Bamba	20 December 2009 (aged 15)	(Ivorian Football Federation) ASEC Mimosas
8	FW	Elvis Fernand N'Guessan Blaikatchi	10 January 2008 (aged 17)	(Ivorian Football Federation) Yakro FC
9	FW	Alynho Haïdara	26 July 2008 (aged 16)	(Ivorian Football Federation) Mainz 05 Jacqueville
10	MF	Cheick Ahmed Tijane Malo	26 July 2009 (aged 15)	(Ivorian Football Federation) FC San Pédro
11	FW	Moïse Dieudonné Diarrassouba	23 October 2008 (aged 16)	(Ivorian Football Federation) ASFA
12	DF	Vaboué Doumbia	2 April 2008 (aged 16)	(Ivorian Football Federation) ASEC Mimosas
13	DF	Mohamed Diarra	9 December 2008 (aged 16)	(Ivorian Football Federation) FC San Pédro
14	FW	Broulaye Cissé	14 February 2009 (aged 16)	(Ivorian Football Federation) Empire FA
15	MF	Some Adama	22 January 2009 (aged 16)	(Ivorian Football Federation) ISCA
16	GK	Abdoulaye Samake	21 November 2009 (aged 15)	(Ivorian Football Federation) FC San Pédro
17	FW	Cédric Jonathan Gobehi	25 December 2009 (aged 15)	(Ivorian Football Federation) ASEC Mimosas
18	MF	Bi Douali Junior Zahi	2 October 2008 (aged 16)	(Ivorian Football Federation) Stella Club
19	MF	Tape Yannis Emmanuel Touali	11 October 2008 (aged 16)	(Ivorian Football Federation) SOA
21	DF	Oumar Junior Soro	8 November 2008 (aged 16)	(Ivorian Football Federation) Max United
23	GK	Abdoulaye Cissé	14 November 2008 (aged 16)	(Ivorian Football Federation) LYS Sassandra
–	MF	Moussa Idriss Koné	25 August 2008 (aged 16)	(Ivorian Football Federation) FC San Pédro
–	DF	Ange Emmanuel Zongo	25 December 2008 (aged 16)	(Ivorian Football Federation) ASEC Mimosas

=== Central African Republic ===
Head coach: Dertin Boulengue

No.	Pos.	Player	Date of birth (age)	Club
1	GK	Yarin Stive Dothe Bebona	25 August 2008 (aged 16)	(French Football Federation) FC Montfermeil
2	DF	Merveil De Dieu Zourou	12 July 2008 (aged 16)	(Central African Football Federation) FCF Academy
3	DF	Yowan Chrislin Molondoko	24 September 2008 (aged 16)	(Central African Football Federation) FCF Academy
4	DF	Nelson Amadi	6 March 2008 (aged 17)	(French Football Federation) FC Metz
5	DF	Basile Destin Selemby	6 April 2008 (aged 16)	(French Football Federation) Montpellier HSC
7	MF	Constantin Nevys Saidou	10 August 2009 (aged 15)	(Central African Football Federation) FCF Academy
8	MF	Edwin Titalom-Penka	31 May 2009 (aged 15)	(French Football Federation) AS Saint-Priest
9	FW	Venance Goporo	30 March 2009 (aged 16)	(Central African Football Federation) SCAF Tocages
10	MF	Lewis Killian Mackfoy	15 January 2008 (aged 17)	(French Football Federation) ESTAC
11	FW	Lionel Kodane	3 January 2009 (aged 16)	(French Football Federation) Paris FC
12	MF	Anan Jefferson Otto	11 June 2009 (aged 15)	(Central African Football Federation) TP USCA Bangui
13	MF	Rondy Christopher Kethevoama	15 December 2008 (aged 16)	(Central African Football Federation) EFDY
14	FW	Chrispin Ngombe	12 March 2008 (aged 17)	(Central African Football Federation) EFDY
16	GK	Jovani Guidat-Henzo	23 August 2008 (aged 16)	(Central African Football Federation) Anges de Fatima
17	FW	Christopher Ngoandjide	4 July 2009 (aged 15)	(Central African Football Federation) FCF Academy
20	FW	Jerry Christian Bogote	6 April 2008 (aged 16)	(Central African Football Federation) FCF Academy
21	MF	Lucres Betoloum-Bonai	25 March 2008 (aged 17)	(Central African Football Federation) DFC8
22	GK	Ousman Tanko Binguimale	26 December 2009 (aged 15)	(Central African Football Federation) FCF Academy
23	DF	Steven Tita-Kenguemba	13 March 2008 (aged 17)	(French Football Federation) AS Saint-Priest
24	DF	Josué Palanda	14 May 2009 (aged 15)	(Central African Football Federation) FCF Academy
25	DF	Deymon Ephrem Yandocka	25 March 2008 (aged 17)	(French Football Federation) AS Saint-Priest
–	DF	Rodolphe Kouzoutelendji		(Central African Football Federation) FCF Academy
–	DF	Henri II Le Petit Bamongo		(Central African Football Federation) FCF Academy
–	MF	Abakar Abdelaziz		(Central African Football Federation) SEWA
–	MF	St-François Koyembe		(Central African Football Federation) AS Tempête Mocaf
