= 2024–25 in Libyan football =

Football in Libya
- Season: 2024–25

The following is an article detailing Libyan football activity, covering national team and club competitions domestically and internationally.

== National teams ==
=== Senior ===
==== 2025 Africa Cup of Nations qualification ====
Pos	Team	Pld	W	D	L	GF	GA	GD	Pts	Qualification	Nigeria	Benin	Rwanda	Libya
1	Nigeria	6	3	2	1	9	3	+6	11	Final tournament	—	3–0	1–2	1–0
2	Benin	6	2	2	2	7	7	0	8 (Note: Head-to-head points: Benin 3, Rwanda 3. Head-to-head goal difference: Benin +2, Rwanda –2.)	Final tournament	1–1	—	3–0	2–1
3	Rwanda	6	2	2	2	5	7	−2	8		0–0	2–1	—	0–1
4	Libya	6	1	2	3	3	7	−4	5		0–3 (Note: Nigeria were awarded a 3–0 win after the match did not take place: upon their arrival in Libya, the Nigerian team were stranded at the airport for over 12 hours, with their federation ultimately refusing to play the match before flying the team back home.)	0–0	1–1	—

Source: CAF
Notes:

4 September 2024 1	Libya	1–1	Rwanda	Tripoli
18:00 UTC+2	Al-Dhawi 16'	Report	Nshuti 49'	Stadium: Tripoli International Stadium; Referee: Imtehaz Heeralall (Mauritius)

10 September 2024 2	Benin	2–1	Libya	Abidjan, Ivory Coast
19:00 UTC+0	Mounié 50'; Olaitan 62' (pen.)	Report	Al Badri 9' (pen.)	Stadium: Felix Houphouet Boigny Stadium; Referee: Abdel Aziz Mohamed Bouh (Mauritania)
Note: The match was held at a neutral venue due to the lack of suitable facilities in Benin.

11 October 2024 3	Nigeria	1–0	Libya	Uyo, Nigeria
17:00 UTC+1	Dele-Bashiru 86'	Report		Stadium: Godswill Akpabio International Stadium; Referee: Godfrey Nkhakananga (Malawi)

15 October 2024 4	Libya	0–3; Awarded	Nigeria	Benghazi
21:00 UTC+2				Stadium: Benina Martyrs Stadium

14 November 2024 5	Rwanda	0–1	Libya	Kigali, Rwanda
18:00 UTC+2		Report	Al-Mesmari 84'	Stadium: Amahoro Stadium; Referee: Celso Alvação (Mozambique)

18 November 2024 6	Libya	0–0	Benin	Tripoli
18:00 UTC+2				Stadium: Tripoli International Stadium; Referee: Patrice Milazare (Mauritius)

==== 2026 FIFA World Cup qualification ====
Pos	Team	Pld	W	D	L	GF	GA	GD	Pts	Qualification	(Cape Verde)	(Cameroon)	(Libya)	(Angola)	(Mauritius)	(Eswatini)
1	Cape Verde	10	7	2	1	16	8	+8	23	2026 FIFA World Cup	—	1–0	1–0	0–0	1–0	3–0
2	Cameroon	10	5	4	1	17	5	+12	19	Second round	4–1	—	3–1	0–0	3–0	3–0
3	Libya	10	4	4	2	12	10	+2	16		3–3	1–1	—	1–1	2–1	2–0
4	Angola	10	2	6	2	9	8	+1	12		1–2	1–1	0–1	—	3–1	1–0
5	Mauritius	10	1	3	6	7	17	−10	6		0–2	0–2	0–0	0–0	—	2–1
6	Eswatini	10	0	3	7	6	19	−13	3		0–2	0–0	0–1	2–2	3–3	—

Source: FIFA

March 2025	Libya	v	Angola	Libya

March 2025	Cameroon	v	Libya	Cameroon

==== Friendlies ====
31 August 2024	Libya	1–0	Botswana	Tripoli
	Krawa'a 54'	Report		Stadium: Tripoli International Stadium

=== U20 ===
17 October 2024 Hybrid friendly	Libya	1–2	(Libya) Al-Hilal Benghazi	Benghazi
17:00 UTC+2			Ben Abdi; Al-Mariami	Stadium: Benina Martyrs Stadium

14 November 2024 UNAF Tournament	Libya	1–2	Tunisia	Ismailia, Egypt
17:00 UTC+2	Al Harak 40'		Mahmoud 21'; Becha 87' (pen.)	Stadium: Suez Canal Stadium

20 November 2024 UNAF Tournament	Libya	1–2	Egypt	Ismailia, Egypt
17:00 UTC+2	Mansour 77'		Kabaka 75' (pen.); Bustangi 90'	Stadium: Suez Canal Stadium

23 November 2024 UNAF Tournament	Morocco	4–0	Libya	Ismailia, Egypt
20:00 UTC+2				Stadium: Suez Canal Stadium

26 November 2024 UNAF Tournament	Algeria	4–0	Libya	Ismailia, Egypt
18:00 UTC+2				Stadium: Suez Canal Stadium

=== U17 ===
14 November 2024 UNAF Tournament	Tunisia	2–1	Libya	Casablanca, Morocco
20:00 UTC+1	Saidi 44'; Chaabane 76' (pen.)		Abdulwahhab 60'

17 November 2024 UNAF Tournament	Libya	2–3	Algeria	Casablanca, Morocco
20:00 UTC+1	Al Shawish 26'; Abdulwahhab 64' (pen.)		Fettouche 37'; Boudouab 40', 67'

20 November 2024 UNAF Tournament	Morocco	2–0	Libya	Casablanca, Morocco
20:00 UTC+1	El Aoud 7'; Baha 62' (pen.)

23 November 2024 UNAF Tournament	Egypt	7–1	Libya	Casablanca, Morocco
17:00 UTC+1

== International competitions ==
=== CAF Champions League ===
First round

Team 1	Agg.	Team 2	1st leg	2nd leg
Al-Ahly Benghazi (Libya)	1–2	(Sudan) Al-Hilal	0–1	1–1
Al-Nasr (Libya)	0–2	(Sudan) Al-Merrikh SC	0–0	0–2

=== CAF Confederation Cup ===
First round

Team 1	Agg.	Team 2	1st leg	2nd leg
Uhamiaji FC (Zanzibar)	1–5	(Libya) Al-Ahli Tripoli	0–2	1–3
Kitara FC (Uganda)	4–6	(Libya) Al-Hilal Benghazi	2–3	2–3

Second round

Team 1	Agg.	Team 2	1st leg	2nd leg
Al-Ahli Tripoli (Libya)	1–3	(Tanzania) Simba	0–0	1–3
Al-Hilal Benghazi (Libya)	5–5 (3–5 p)	(Egypt) Al Masry	3–2	2–3

== Domestic competitions ==
=== Premier League ===
Pos	Team	Pld	W	D	L	GF	GA	GD	Pts	Promotion, qualification or relegation
1	Al-Nasr	16	9	5	2	20	9	+11	32	Qualification for the second round
2	Al-Akhdar	16	9	4	3	25	11	+14	31	Qualification for the second round
3	Al-Tahaddy	16	6	7	3	20	14	+6	25	Qualification for the second round
4	Al-Anwar	16	5	4	7	18	26	−8	19	
5	Al-Suqoor	16	5	4	7	16	20	−4	19	
6	Al-Borouq	16	3	9	4	14	15	−1	18	
7	Khaleej Sirte	16	4	5	7	15	21	−6	17	Relegation play-offs
8	Al-Ansar (Note: Al-Ansar were deducted 1 point.)	16	5	2	9	17	24	−7	16	Relegation play-offs
9	Al-Wefaq Ajdabiya (Note: Al-Wefaq Ajdabiya were deducted 3 points.) (R)	16	4	4	8	9	14	−5	13	Relegation to First Division

(R) Relegated
Notes:

Pos	Team	Pld	W	D	L	GF	GA	GD	Pts	Promotion, qualification or relegation
1	Al-Hilal Benghazi	14	11	1	2	30	12	+18	34	Qualification for the second round
2	Al-Ahli Benghazi	14	11	1	2	31	6	+25	34	Qualification for the second round
3	Al-Sadaqa	14	7	3	4	16	13	+3	24	Qualification for the second round
4	Al-Ta'awon	14	6	4	4	19	14	+5	22	
5	Al-Andalus	14	5	3	6	17	18	−1	18	
6	Al-Murooj	14	3	3	8	14	25	−11	12	Relegation play-offs
7	Al-Branes	14	2	2	10	11	28	−17	8	Relegation play-offs
8	Al-Mahdia (R)	14	1	3	10	8	30	−22	6	Relegation to First Division

(R) Relegated

Pos	Team	Pld	W	D	L	GF	GA	GD	Pts	Promotion, qualification or relegation
1	Asswehly	16	12	4	0	36	12	+24	40	Qualification for the second round
2	Olympic Azzaweya	16	11	4	1	28	13	+15	37	Qualification for the second round
3	Al-Ittihad Tripoli	16	8	4	4	24	10	+14	28	Qualification for the second round
4	Al-Majd	16	6	3	7	25	29	−4	21	
5	Abu Salim	16	6	2	8	20	24	−4	20	
6	Al Bashaer	16	4	5	7	19	21	−2	17	
7	Shabab Al Ghar	16	4	8	4	18	18	0	20	Relegation play-offs
8	Al Tarsana	16	3	6	7	22	22	0	15	Relegation play-offs
9	Al Nahda Sabha (Note: Al Nahda Sabha were deducted 3 points.) (R)	16	0	0	16	5	48	−43	−3	Relegation to First Division

(R) Relegated
Notes:

Pos	Team	Pld	W	D	L	GF	GA	GD	Pts	Promotion, qualification or relegation
1	Al-Ahli Tripoli	16	13	3	0	38	4	+34	42	Qualification for the second round
2	Al-Madina	16	10	4	2	27	14	+13	34	Qualification for the second round
3	Alittihad Misurata	16	6	5	5	14	14	0	23	Qualification for the second round
4	Al-Watan (Note: Al-Watan were deducted 1 point.)	16	5	5	6	19	22	−3	19	
5	Al Malaab El Libby	16	3	9	4	13	15	−2	18	
6	Al Khums	16	5	1	10	11	20	−9	16	
7	Abi al Ashar	16	3	6	7	10	18	−8	15	Relegation play-offs
8	Al Dhahra	16	3	6	7	11	22	−11	15	Relegation play-offs
9	Asaria (R)	16	3	3	10	13	27	−14	12	Relegation to First Division

(R) Relegated
