= 1997 African U-17 Championship qualification =

The 1997 African U-17 Championship qualification was a men's under-17 football competition which decided the participating teams of the 1997 African U-17 Championship.

== Qualification ==
=== First round ===
The first leg match was played on 24 August 1996. The second leg match was played on 15 September 1996. The winner advanced to the Second Round.

Team 1	Agg.	Team 2	1st leg	2nd leg
South Africa	1 – 4	Angola	1 – 1	0 – 3
Malawi	0 – 1	Zimbabwe	0 – 1	0 – 0
Ethiopia	2 – 0	Sudan	1 – 0	1 – 0
Tunisia	3 – 7	Egypt	2 – 5	1 – 2
Guinea	3 – 1	Morocco	2 – 1	1 – 0
Burkina Faso	5 – 2	Algeria	4 – 1	1 – 1
Ivory Coast	3 – 1	Sierra Leone	2 – 0	1 – 1
Chad	1 – 6	Cameroon	1 – 3	0 – 3

=== Second round ===
The matches were played between February and March 1997, but little information is available as all the results of the second leg matches are unknown. The winners advanced to the Finals.

Team 1	Agg.	Team 2	1st leg	2nd leg
Angola	1 – 0	Somalia	1 – 0	
Madagascar	0 – 1	Zimbabwe	0 – 1	
Ethiopia	4 – 1	Zambia	1 – 0	3 – 1
Guinea	0 – 2	Egypt	0 – 0	0 – 2
Ghana	6 – 3	Burkina Faso	4 – 1	2 – 2
Cameroon	1 – 3	Ivory Coast	0 – 1	1 – 2
Mali	2 – 1	Benin	2 – 1	

== Qualified teams ==
- Angola
- Botswana (host nation)
- Ivory Coast
- Egypt
- Ethiopia
- Ghana
- Mali
- Zimbabwe
