= 2024 UNAF U-17 Tournament (Morocco) =

Tournament details
- Country: Morocco
- Dates: 11–23 November
- Teams: 5

Final positions
- Champions: Egypt (4th title)
- Runners-up: Morocco
- Third place: Tunisia

Tournament statistics
- Matches played: 10
- Goals scored: 39 (3.9 per match)
- Top goal scorer(s): (Egypt) Belal Ateya (5 goals)

Awards
- Best player: (Egypt) Belal Ateya

The 2024 UNAF U-17 Tournament, officially named TotalEnergies U-17 Africa Cup of Nations - UNAF Qualifiers 2024 was the 19th edition of the UNAF U-17 Tournament. The tournament took place in Morocco between from 11 and 23 November 2024. The tournament also served as the qualifiers for the 2025 U-17 Africa Cup of Nations. Originally there were 2 qualification spots, but a third spot was added after the competition.

== Participants ==
The five participating teams were:

- Algeria
- Egypt
- Libya
- Morocco (hosts)
- Tunisia

== Venues ==
Cities	Venues	Capacity
Casablanca	Père Jégo Stadium	10,000
Mohammedia	El Bachir Stadium	10,000

== Tournament ==
Pos	Team	Pld	W	D	L	GF	GA	GD	Pts	Qualification
1	Egypt	4	3	0	1	13	9	+4	9	2025 U-17 Africa Cup of Nations
2	Morocco (H)	4	2	2	0	10	4	+6	8	2025 U-17 Africa Cup of Nations
3	Tunisia	4	2	1	1	7	6	+1	7	2025 U-17 Africa Cup of Nations
4	Algeria	4	1	1	2	5	6	−1	4	
5	Libya	4	0	0	4	4	14	−10	0	

Source: UNAF
Rules for classification: 1) Points; 2) Goal difference; 3) Goals scored
(H) Hosts

=== Matches ===
11 November 2024
17:00

Algeria	0–1	Tunisia
	Report	Saidi 45'

Père Jégo Stadium, Casablanca
11 November 2024
20:00

Morocco	5–1	Egypt
El Aoud 20'; Mawhoub 67'; Ouazane 69'; Baha 76'; Belmokhtar 90'	Report	Atya 89'

El Bachir Stadium, Mohammedia

14 November 2024
17:00

Egypt	2–1	Algeria
Hamad 59'; Abdelkarim 67'	Report	Cherfaoui 45' (pen.)

Père Jégo Stadium, Casablanca
14 November 2024
20:00

Tunisia	2–1	Libya
Saidi 44'; Chaabene 76' (pen.)	Report	Abdulwahab 66'

El Bachir Stadium, Mohammedia

17 November 2024
17:00

Morocco	2–2	Tunisia
Baha 30'; Jout 68'	Report	Haj Abdallah 35'; Touati 90+2'

Père Jégo Stadium, Casablanca
17 November 2024
20:00

Libya	2–3	Algeria
El Shawish 25'; Abdulwahab 63' (pen.)	Report	Fettouche 37'; Boudouab 39', 67'

El Bachir Stadium, Mohammedia

20 November 2024
17:00

Tunisia	2–3	Egypt
Saidi 4', 20'	Report	Atya 17'; El Zoghbi 81', 86'

Père Jégo Stadium, Casablanca
20 November 2024
20:00

Libya	0–2	Morocco
	Report	El Aoud 7'; Baha 61' (pen.)

El Bachir Stadium, Mohammedia

23 November 2024
18:00

Algeria	1–1	Morocco
Achouri 5'	Report	Sokrate 58'

El Bachir Stadium, Mohammedia
23 November 2024
18:00

Egypt	7–1	Libya
Abdelkarim 3', 53'; Hamad 27', 47'; Atya 65', 84', 90'	Report	Al-Gamati 73'

Père Jégo Stadium, Casablanca

== Statistics ==
=== Goalscorers ===
There were 39 goals scored in 10 matches, for an average of 3.9 goals per match.

5 goals

- (Egypt) Belal Ateya

4 goals

- (Tunisia) Anisse Saidi

3 goals

- (Egypt) Hamza Abdelkarim
- (Egypt) Mohamed Hamad
- (Morocco) Ziyad Baha

2 goals

- (Algeria) Youcef Boudouab
- (Egypt) Abdelaziz Elzoghaby
- (Libya) Sanad Abdulwahab
- (Morocco) Ismail El Aoud

1 goal

- (Algeria) Abderrahmane Achouri
- (Algeria) Charaf Eddine Cherfaoui
- (Algeria) Benaissa Fettouche
- (Libya) Almunder Al Qmati
- (Libya) Anas Al Shawish
- (Morocco) Ilies Belmokhtar
- (Morocco) Adam Jout
- (Morocco) Ahmed Mawhoub
- (Morocco) Abdellah Ouazane
- (Morocco) Bilal Soukrat
- (Tunisia) Seifeddine Abdallah
- (Tunisia) Mohamed Aziz Chaabane
- (Tunisia) Amine Allah Touati

== Qualified teams for U-17 Africa Cup of Nations ==
The following three teams from UNAF qualified for the 2025 U-17 Africa Cup of Nations.

Team	Qualified on	Previous appearances in U-17 Africa Cup of Nations^{1}
Egypt	23 November 2024	3 (**1997**, 2003, 2011)
Morocco	23 November 2024	3 (2013, 2019, 2023)
Tunisia	5 February 2025	3 (1995, 2007, 2013)

^{1} Bold indicates champion for that year. Italic indicates host for that year.
