= 2025 U-17 Africa Cup of Nations =

15th edition of U-17 AFCON

كأس الأمم الأفريقية تحت 17 سنة 2025; Coupe d'Afrique des nations de football des moins de 17 ans 2025

Tournament details
- Host country: Morocco
- Dates: 30 March – 19 April
- Teams: 16 (from 1 confederation)
- Venues: 4 (in 4 host cities)

Final positions
- Champions: Morocco (1st title)
- Runners-up: Mali
- Third place: Ivory Coast
- Fourth place: Burkina Faso

Tournament statistics
- Matches played: 34
- Goals scored: 100 (2.94 per match)
- Top scorer(s): (Burkina Faso) Asharaf Tapsoba (Ivory Coast) Alynho Haïdara (7 goals each)
- Best player: (Morocco) Abdellah Ouazane
- Best goalkeeper: (Morocco) Chouaib Bellaarouch
- Fair play award: Mali

The 2025 U-17 Africa Cup of Nations, known as the TotalEnergies U-17 Africa Cup of Nations for sponsorship purposes or 2025 U17 AFCON for short, was the 15th edition (20th if editions without hosts are included) of the biennial African youth football tournament organized by Confederation of African Football (CAF) for players aged 17 and below.

Morocco was chosen as the host of this edition on 16 December 2024 at the annual CAF Executive Committee meeting, along the 2024 CAF Awards ceremony in Marrakesh, Morocco. The tournament was held from 30 March to 19 April. The top 10 teams qualified for the 2025 FIFA U-17 World Cup in Qatar as the CAF representatives.

It was the first U-17 Africa Cup of Nations to feature 16 teams. Senegal entered as the defending champions but were eliminated in the quarter-finals. Morocco won the tournament, claiming their first U-17 Africa Cup of Nations title.

== Qualification ==
=== Player eligibility ===
Players born on 1 January 2008 or later were eligible to participate in this tournament edition.

=== Qualified teams ===
The following teams qualified for the tournament.

Team	Zone	Date of qualification	Appearance	Last appearance	Previous best performance
Egypt	North Zone	23 November 2024	4th	2011	Champions (1997)
Morocco (hosts)	North Zone	23 November 2024	4th	2023	Runners-up (2023)
Tunisia	North Zone	5 February 2025	4th	2013	Third place (2013)
Mali	West A Zone	1 November 2024	10th	2023	Champions (2015, 2017)
Senegal	West A Zone	1 November 2024	4th	2023	Champions (2023)
Gambia	West A Zone	5 February 2025	5th	2011	Champions (2005, 2009)
Burkina Faso	West B Zone	25 May 2024	8th	2023	Champions (2011)
Ivory Coast	West B Zone	25 May 2024	6th	2015	Champions (2013)
Cameroon	Central Zone	22 February 2025	9th	2023	Champions (2003, 2019)
Central African Republic	Central Zone	22 February 2025	1st	None	Debut
Tanzania	Central-East Zone	24 December 2024	3rd	2019	Group stage (2017, 2019)
Uganda	Central-East Zone	24 December 2024	2nd	2019	Group stage (2019)
Somalia	Central-East Zone	5 February 2025	2nd	2023	Group stage (2023)
Angola	South Zone	11 December 2024	5th	2019	Third place (2019)
Zambia	South Zone	11 December 2024	3rd	2023	Group stage (2015, 2023)
South Africa	South Zone	5 February 2025	5th	2023	Runners-up (2015)

== Venues ==
The host country for the final tournament is Morocco, appointed during the General Assembly held in Marrakesh, Morocco, on 16 December 2024.

The Royal Moroccan Football Federation choose four venues in four cities across the host nation Morocco: Casablanca, El Jadida, Mohammedia and Berrechid.

Casablanca	El Jadida	Mohammedia	Berrechid
Larbi Zaouli Stadium	Ben M'Hamed El Abdi Stadium	El Bachir Stadium	Berrechid Municipal Stadium
Capacity: 18,600	Capacity: 15,000	Capacity: 10,000	Capacity: 5,000

== Squads ==
The 16 national teams involved in the tournament were required to register a squad of 21 players with an option of up to 5 more additional players, including three goalkeepers. Only players born on or after 1 January 2008 are eligible to be registered in these squads.

== Draw ==
The draw procedure was announced on 10 February 2025, with the draw to occur on 13 February 2025 in Cairo, Egypt. The 16 teams were drawn into four groups of four teams. Teams are seeded according to their performance in the 2023 U-17 Africa Cup of Nations. Hosts Morocco were automatically assigned to Position A1 in the draw. Previous edition winners Senegal were assigned to Position C1 with Burkina Faso and Mali assigned to positions B1 and D1 respectively. The rest of the field were placed in Pot 1 to be drawn into the remaining positions.

Seeded	Pot 1
Morocco (A1); Senegal (C1); Burkina Faso (B1); Mali (D1)	Angola; Cameroon; Central African Republic; Egypt; Gambia; Ivory Coast; Somalia; South Africa; Tanzania; Tunisia; Uganda; Zambia

== Group stage ==
=== Tiebreakers ===
Teams were ranked according to the three points for a win system (3 points for a win, 1 for a draw, 0 points for a loss), and if tied on points, the following tiebreaking criteria were applied, in the order given, to determine the rankings:

1. Points in head-to-head matches among tied teams;
2. Goal difference in head-to-head matches among tied teams;
3. Goals scored in head-to-head matches among tied teams;
4. If more than two teams were tied, and after applying all head-to-head criteria above, if two teams are still tied, all head-to-head criteria above are applied exclusively to these two teams;
5. Goal difference in all group matches;
6. Goals scored in all group matches;
7. Drawing of lots.

=== Group A ===
Pos	Team	Pld	W	D	L	GF	GA	GD	Pts	Qualification
1	Morocco (H)	3	2	1	0	8	0	+8	7	Knockout stage and 2025 FIFA U-17 World Cup
2	Zambia	3	2	1	0	6	2	+4	7	Knockout stage and 2025 FIFA U-17 World Cup
3	Uganda	3	1	0	2	4	7	−3	3	FIFA U-17 World Cup play-off
4	Tanzania	3	0	0	3	1	10	−9	0	

Source: CAF
Rules for classification: Tiebreakers
(H) Hosts
30 March 2025
22:00

Morocco	5–0	Uganda
Belmokhtar 3', 32' (pen.); Ait Cheikh 8'; Baha 24', 71'	Report

El Bachir Stadium, Mohammedia
Referee: Brahamou Sadou Ali (Niger)
31 March 2025
14:00

Tanzania	1–4	Zambia
Sagwe 90+5'	Report	Kalimina 8'; Nyirongo 45'; Mutale 79'; Phiri 90+6'

El Bachir Stadium, Mohammedia
Referee: Vincentia Amedome (Togo)

3 April 2025
17:00

Uganda	3–0	Tanzania
Wanyama 61'; Okello 85'; Bogere 90+2' (pen.)	Report

El Bachir Stadium, Mohammedia
Referee: Lominson Todihajaniaina (Madagascar)
3 April 2025
20:00

Zambia	0–0	Morocco
	Report

El Bachir Stadium, Mohammedia
Referee: Vincent Kabore (Burkina Faso)

6 April 2025
20:00

Morocco	3–0	Tanzania
Belmokhtar 76'; Ouazane 81', 84'	Report

El Bachir Stadium, Mohammedia
Referee: Brighton Chimene (Zimbabwe)
6 April 2025
20:00

Uganda	1–2	Zambia
Torach 49'	Report	Chipelu 20'; Daka 86'

Larbi Zaouli Stadium, Casablanca
Referee: Abdulwahid Huraywidah (Libya)

=== Group B ===
Pos	Team	Pld	W	D	L	GF	GA	GD	Pts	Qualification
1	Burkina Faso	3	3	0	0	6	2	+4	9	Knockout stage and 2025 FIFA U-17 World Cup
2	South Africa	3	1	1	1	4	5	−1	4	Knockout stage and 2025 FIFA U-17 World Cup
3	Egypt	3	1	0	2	6	7	−1	3	FIFA U-17 World Cup play-off
4	Cameroon	3	0	1	2	2	4	−2	1	

Source: CAF
Rules for classification: Tiebreakers
31 March 2025
17:00

Burkina Faso	2–1	Cameroon
Tapsoba 19', 41'	Report	Mimbang 75'

Larbi Zaouli Stadium, Casablanca
Referee: Hamza El Fareq (Morocco)
31 March 2025
20:00

South Africa	4–3	Egypt
Mlondo 1'; Bohloko 27' (pen.), 41' (pen.); Witbooi 71'	Report	Roshdi 4', 13'; Abdelkarim 18'

Larbi Zaouli Stadium, Casablanca
Referee: Leonidas da Graça (Cape Verde)

3 April 2025
14:00

Cameroon	0–0	South Africa
	Report

Larbi Zaouli Stadium, Casablanca
Referee: Brahamou Sadou Ali (Niger)
3 April 2025
17:00

Egypt	1–2	Burkina Faso
Ateya 78'	Report	Dabo 41'; Tapsoba 69'

Larbi Zaouli Stadium, Casablanca
Referee: Brighton Chimene (Zimbabwe)

6 April 2025
17:00

Burkina Faso	2–0	South Africa
Bara 65'; Tapsoba 89'	Report

Larbi Zaouli Stadium, Casablanca
Referee: Aline Umutoni (Rwanda)
6 April 2025
17:00

Cameroon	1–2	Egypt
Zibi 33' (pen.)	Report	Abdelkarim 43' (pen.); El-Zoghbi 66'

El Bachir Stadium, Mohammedia
Referee: Vincentia Amedome (Togo)

=== Group C ===
Pos	Team	Pld	W	D	L	GF	GA	GD	Pts	Qualification
1	Tunisia	3	2	1	0	5	1	+4	7	Knockout stage and 2025 FIFA U-17 World Cup
2	Senegal	3	2	1	0	3	0	+3	7	Knockout stage and 2025 FIFA U-17 World Cup
3	Gambia	3	1	0	2	6	4	+2	3	FIFA U-17 World Cup play-off
4	Somalia	3	0	0	3	1	10	−9	0	

Source: CAF
Rules for classification: Tiebreakers
1 April 2025
14:00

Senegal	1–0	Gambia
I. Sow 7'	Report

Ben M'Hamed El Abdi Stadium, El Jadida
Referee: Vincent Kabore (Burkina Faso)
1 April 2025
17:00

Somalia	0–3	Tunisia
	Report	Tayechi 6', 58'; Saidi 43'

Ben M'Hamed El Abdi Stadium, El Jadida
Referee: Reginald Amoah (Ghana)

4 April 2025
14:00

Gambia	5–1	Somalia
Drammeh 4' (pen.), 16', 76'; L. Mohamed 45+3' (o.g.); Mendy 89'	Report	A. Mohamed 48'

Ben M'Hamed El Abdi Stadium, El Jadida
Referee: Cregue Moukagni (Gabon)
4 April 2025
17:00

Tunisia	0–0	Senegal
	Report

Ben M'Hamed El Abdi Stadium, El Jadida
Referee: Antsino Twanyanyukwa (Namibia)

7 April 2025
20:00

Senegal	2–0	Somalia
I. Sow 29' (pen.); E. Sow 90+4'	Report

Ben M'Hamed El Abdi Stadium, El Jadida
Referee: Bouchra Karboubi (Morocco)
7 April 2025
20:00

Gambia	1–2	Tunisia
Mendy 46'	Report	Ben Mahmoud 42'; Saidi 57' (pen.)

Berrechid Municipal Stadium, Berrechid
Referee: Lominson Josianno Elivas Todihajaniaina (Madagascar)

=== Group D ===
Pos	Team	Pld	W	D	L	GF	GA	GD	Pts	Qualification
1	Ivory Coast	3	2	1	0	10	3	+7	7	Knockout stage and 2025 FIFA U-17 World Cup
2	Mali	3	2	0	1	6	5	+1	6	Knockout stage and 2025 FIFA U-17 World Cup
3	Angola	3	1	1	1	7	3	+4	4	FIFA U-17 World Cup play-off
4	Central African Republic	3	0	0	3	2	14	−12	0	

Source: CAF
Rules for classification: Tiebreakers
1 April 2025
17:00

Mali	2–1	Angola
Bomba 11'; S. Coulibaly 74'	Report	Jayden Puna 45+3'

Berrechid Municipal Stadium, Berrechid
Referee: Abdulwahid Huraywidah (Libya)
1 April 2025
20:00

Ivory Coast	6–1	Central African Republic
Haïdara 4', 13', 41' (pen.), 55' (pen.); Koidio 21'; Touali 88'	Report	Otto 45+4'

Berrechid Municipal Stadium, Berrechid
Referee: Aline Umutoni (Rwanda)

4 April 2025
17:00

Angola	0–0	Ivory Coast
	Report

Berrechid Municipal Stadium, Berrechid
Referee: Bouchra Karboubi (Morocco)
4 April 2025
20:00

Central African Republic	0–2	Mali
	Report	Fané 21'; Bomba 46'

Berrechid Municipal Stadium, Berrechid
Referee: Lucky Kasalirwe (Uganda)

7 April 2025
17:00

Mali	2–4	Ivory Coast
Dembélé 45+3'; Bomba 69'	Report	Haïdara 4', 18' (pen.); Keita 41' (o.g.); B. Cissé 90+5'

Berrechid Municipal Stadium, Berrechid
Referee: Antsino Twanyanyukwa (Namibia)
7 April 2025
17:00

Angola	6–1	Central African Republic
Lucas 13' (pen.); Liyun 26', 63', 69'; Muanha 64', 90+2'	Report	Otto 87'

Ben M'Hamed El Abdi Stadium, El Jadida
Referee: Hamza El Fareq (Morocco)

== FIFA U-17 World Cup play-off ==
Winners qualified for 2025 FIFA U-17 World Cup.

12 April 2025
17:00

Uganda	2–1	Gambia
Bogere 13', 33'	Report	Kanyi 1'

Ben M'Hamed El Abdi Stadium, El Jadida
Referee: Bouchra Karboubi (Morocco)
12 April 2025
20:00

Egypt	2–1	Angola
El-Zoghbi 39'; Abdelkarim 69'	Report	Lourenço 83'

Ben M'Hamed El Abdi Stadium, El Jadida
Referee: Vincent Kabore (Burkina Faso)

== Knockout stage ==
In the knockout stage, penalty shoot-outs are used to decide the winner if necessary (Regulations Article 75).

=== Bracket ===
Quarter-finals
10 April – Mohammedia
Morocco	3
South Africa	1
11 April – Berrechid
Ivory Coast (p)	0 (5)
Senegal	0 (3)
10 April – Casablanca
Burkina Faso	6
Zambia	1
11 April – El Jadida
Tunisia	1 (9)
Mali (p)	1 (10)

Semi-finals
15 April – Mohammedia
Morocco (p)	0 (4)
Ivory Coast	0 (3)
15 April – Casablanca
Burkina Faso	0
Mali	2

Final
19 April – Mohammedia
Morocco (p)	0 (4)
Mali	0 (2)
Third place match
18 April – Casablanca
Ivory Coast (p)	1 (4)
Burkina Faso	1 (1)

=== Quarter-finals ===
10 April 2025
17:00

Burkina Faso	6–1	Zambia
Fofana 11'; Tapsoba 21' (pen.), 77' (pen.), 90'; Diakité 58', 68'	Report	Nyirongo 35'

Larbi Zaouli Stadium, Casablanca
Referee: Hamza El Fareq (Morocco)
10 April 2025
20:00

Morocco	3–1	South Africa
El Aoud 13'; Baha 61', 62'	Report	Bohloko 54'

El Bachir Stadium, Mohammedia
Referee: Brahamou Sadou Ali (Niger)

11 April 2025
17:00

Ivory Coast	0–0	Senegal
	Report
Penalties
Touali (penalty scored); Doumbia (penalty scored); N'Guessan (penalty scored); Gobehi (penalty scored); Haïdara (penalty scored)	5–3	(penalty scored) A. Mbengue; (penalty missed) O. Ndiaye; (penalty scored) E. Cissé; (penalty scored) Dieng

Berrechid Municipal Stadium, Berrechid
Referee: Abdulwahid Huraywidah (Libya)
11 April 2025
20:00

Tunisia	1–1	Mali
Saidi 79'	Report	Dembélé 42'
Penalties
Saidi (penalty missed); Ben Ali (penalty scored); Mokhtari (penalty scored); Tayechi (penalty scored); Telmoudi (penalty scored); Abdallah (penalty scored); Akid (penalty scored); Touati (penalty scored); Hasni (penalty scored); Krai (penalty scored); Bouaskar (penalty missed)	9–10	(penalty scored) Bomba; (penalty missed) Keita; (penalty scored) Fané; (penalty scored) Berthe; (penalty scored) Dembélé; (penalty scored) Tounkara; (penalty scored) Camara; (penalty scored) Doumbia; (penalty scored) Traoré; (penalty scored) Konaté; (penalty scored) Diarra

Ben M'Hamed El Abdi Stadium, El Jadida
Referee: Brighton Chimene (Zimbabwe)

=== Semi-finals ===
15 April 2025
17:00

Burkina Faso	0–2	Mali
	Report	Fané 42'; Traoré 74'

Larbi Zaouli Stadium, Casablanca
Referee: Abdulwahid Huraywidah (Libya)
15 April 2025
20:00

Morocco	0–0	Ivory Coast
	Report
Penalties
Belmokhtar (penalty missed); Baha (penalty scored); El Khalfioui (penalty scored); Ouahabi (penalty scored); Ouazane (penalty missed); Mouhoub (penalty scored)	4–3	(penalty missed) Touali; (penalty missed) Doumbia; (penalty scored) N'Guessan; (penalty scored) Bamba; (penalty scored) Haïdara; (penalty missed) Sylla

El Bachir Stadium, Mohammedia
Referee: Brighton Chimene (Zimbabwe)

=== Third place match ===
18 April 2025
20:00

Ivory Coast	1–1	Burkina Faso
Haïdara 84'	Report	Diakité 28'
Penalties
Haïdara (penalty scored); Bamba (penalty scored); Doumbia (penalty scored); Touali (penalty scored)	4–1	(penalty scored) Barro; (penalty missed) Coulibaly; (penalty missed) Ouattara

Larbi Zaouli Stadium, Casablanca
Referee: Lominson Josianno Elivas Todihajaniaina (Madagascar)

=== Final ===
19 April 2025
15:00 (Note: The match was originally scheduled to kick-off at 20:00, but was rescheduled to 15:00.)

Morocco	0–0	Mali
	Report
Penalties
Baha (penalty scored); El Khalfioui (penalty scored); Ouahabi (penalty scored); Belmokhtar (penalty scored)	4–2	(penalty scored) Bomba; (penalty missed) Keita; (penalty missed) Koné; (penalty scored) Berthe

El Bachir Stadium, Mohammedia
Referee: Antsino Twanyanyukwa (Namibia)

== Tournament rankings ==
Results of countries participating in AFCON U17 2025 Champion Runner-up Third place Fourth place Quarter-finals Play-off matches Group stage

Ranking criteria
For teams eliminated in the same knockout round, the following criteria are applied, in the order given, to determine the final rankings:
1. Goal difference in round eliminated;
2. Goals scored in round eliminated;
3. If teams eliminated in the semi-finals are still tied, the above criteria are reapplied for the quarter-finals round;
4. Points in group stage;
5. Goal difference in group stage;
6. Goals scored in group stage;
7. Disciplinary points.

For teams eliminated in the group stage, the following criteria are applied, in the order given, to determine the final rankings

1. Position in group;
2. Points;
3. Goal difference;
4. Goals scored;
5. Disciplinary points.

Pos.	Team	Pld	W	D	L	Pts	GF	GA	GD
1	Morocco	6	3	3	0	12	11	1	+10
2	Mali	6	3	2	1	11	9	6	+3
3	Ivory Coast	6	2	4	0	10	11	4	+7
4	Burkina Faso	6	4	1	1	13	13	6	+7
Eliminated in the quarter-finals
5	Tunisia	4	2	2	0	8	6	2	+4
6	Senegal	4	2	2	0	8	3	0	+3
7	South Africa	4	1	1	2	4	5	8	−3
8	Zambia	4	2	1	1	7	7	8	−1
Eliminated in the group stage
9	Egypt	4	2	0	2	6	8	8	0
10	Uganda	4	2	0	2	6	6	8	−2
11	Angola	4	1	1	2	4	8	5	+3
12	Gambia	4	1	0	3	3	7	6	+1
Played play-off matches
13	Cameroon	3	0	1	2	1	2	4	−2
14	Somalia	3	0	0	3	0	1	10	−9
15	Tanzania	3	0	0	3	0	1	10	−9
16	Central African Republic	3	0	0	3	0	2	14	−12

== Goalscorers ==
There were 100 goals scored in 34 matches, for an average of 2.94 goals per match.

7 goals

- (Burkina Faso) Asharaf Tapsoba
- (Ivory Coast) Alynho Haïdara

4 goals

- (Morocco) Ziyad Baha

3 goals

- (Angola) Densel Liyun
- (Burkina Faso) Halidou Diakité
- (Egypt) Hamza Abdelkarim
- (The Gambia) Alieu Drammeh
- (Mali) Ndjicoura Bomba
- (Morocco) Ilies Belmokhtar
- (South Africa) Neo Bohloko
- (Tunisia) Anisse Saidi
- (Uganda) James Bogere

2 goals

- (Angola) Jairo Muanha
- (Central African Republic) Anan Otto
- (Egypt) Abdelaziz El-Zoghbi
- (Egypt) Anas Roshdi Emam
- (The Gambia) Bisenty Mendy
- (Mali) Seydou Dembélé
- (Mali) Soumaila Fané
- (Morocco) Abdellah Ouazane
- (Senegal) Ibrahima Sory Sow
- (Tunisia) Fedi Tayechi
- (Zambia) Abel Nyirongo

1 goal

- (Angola) Lourenço José Didissa
- (Angola) Delfim Betuela Luwawu
- (Angola) Jayden Puna
- (Burkina Faso) Issouf Bara
- (Burkina Faso) Issouf Dabo
- (Burkina Faso) Mohamed Fofana
- (Cameroon) David Mimbang
- (Cameroon) André Zibi
- (Egypt) Belal Ateya
- (Ivory Coast) Broulaye Cissé
- (Ivory Coast) Mobio Koidio
- (Ivory Coast) Yannis Touali
- (The Gambia) Ahmed Njundu Kanyi
- (Mali) Soungalo Coulibaly
- (Mali) Mahamadou Traoré
- (Morocco) Driss Ait Cheikh
- (Morocco) Ismail El Aoud
- (Senegal) El Hadji Ibrahima Sow
- (Somalia) Anas Isse Mohamed
- (South Africa) Simphiwe Mlondo
- (South Africa) Emile Witbooi
- (Tanzania) Juma Sagwe
- (Tunisia) Yessine Ben Mahmoud
- (Uganda) Richard Okello
- (Uganda) Elvis Torach
- (Uganda) Simon Wanyama
- (Zambia) Kelvin Chipelu
- (Zambia) Billy Daka
- (Zambia) Jonathan Kalimina
- (Zambia) Mike Mutale
- (Zambia) Gabriel Phiri

1 own goal

- (Mali) Lamine Keita (against Ivory Coast)
- (Somalia) Liban Kalif Mohamed (against Gambia)

== Awards ==
The following awards were given at the conclusion of the tournament:

Golden Boot	Most Valuable Player	Best Goalkeeper	Coach of the Tournament	Fair Play award
(Burkina Faso) Asharaf Tapsoba (Ivory Coast) Alynho Haïdara	(Morocco) Abdellah Ouazane	(Morocco) Chouaib Bellaarouch	(Morocco) Nabil Baha	Mali

== Qualified teams for the 2025 FIFA U-17 World Cup ==
The following teams from CAF qualified for the 2025 FIFA U-17 World Cup in Qatar.

Team	Qualified on	Previous appearances in FIFA U-17 World Cup^{1}
Burkina Faso	3 April 2025	5 (1999, 2001, 2009, 2011, 2023)
Mali	4 April 2025	6 (1997, 1999, 2001, 2015, 2017, 2023)
Morocco	6 April 2025	2 (2013, 2023)
South Africa	6 April 2025	1 (2015)
Zambia	6 April 2025	0 (debut)
Ivory Coast	7 April 2025	4 (1987, 2005, 2011, 2013)
Senegal	7 April 2025	2 (2019, 2023)
Tunisia	7 April 2025	3 (1993, 2007, 2013)
Egypt	12 April 2025	2 (1987, 1997)
Uganda	12 April 2025	0 (debut)

^{1} Bold indicates champions for that year. Italic indicates hosts for that year.

== See also ==
- 2025 U-20 Africa Cup of Nations
