= Mohamed Fofana =

Mohamed Fofana may refer to:

- Mohamed Fofana (footballer, born March 1985), Malian footballer
- Mohamed Fofana (footballer, born May 1985), French footballer
- Mohamed Fofana (footballer, born October 1985), Guinean footballer
- Mohamed Fofana (footballer, born 2008), Burkinabe footballer on the 2025 U-17 Africa Cup of Nations squad
