= List of ambassadors of Guinea to China =

Coordinates: 39.944853°N 116.453576°E

Ambassador of Guinea to China
- Inaugural holder: Camara Moussa Sanguiana
- Formation: 1961

The Guinean ambassador in Beijing is the official representative of the Government in Conakry to the Government of the People's Republic of China.

== List of representatives ==
Designated/accredited	Ambassador	Observations	List of prime ministers of Guinea	Premier of the People's Republic of China	Term end
1961	Camara Moussa Sanguiana		Ahmed Sékou Touré	Zhou Enlai	1963
1963	Camara Mamady		Ahmed Sékou Touré	Zhou Enlai	1966
1966	Camara Sékou	Brother of the late Loffo Camara, said Philo, former ambassador of Guinea in Algeria.	Ahmed Sékou Touré	Zhou Enlai	1969
1969	Kamano Ansou		Ahmed Sékou Touré	Zhou Enlai	1971
1971	Diop Mamadou		Ahmed Sékou Touré	Zhou Enlai	1972
1971	Mamadi Kaba (diplomat)	Chargé d'affaires	Ahmed Sékou Touré	Zhou Enlai	1972
1972	Aboubacar Camara (diplomat)		Louis Lansana Béavogui	Zhou Enlai	1976
1976	Sekou Yansane		Louis Lansana Béavogui	Hua Guofeng	1978
1978	Daouda Kourouma		Louis Lansana Béavogui	Hua Guofeng	1981
1981	Thierno Habib Diallo	Hadj	Louis Lansana Béavogui	Zhao Ziyang	1983
1983	Koikoi Grovogui		Louis Lansana Béavogui	Zhao Ziyang	1985
1988	Adpourahemane Sow		Diarra Traoré	Li Peng	
May 25, 1990	Abou Camara	1988: Abou Camara goes to Morocco. Mr Camara was prior to the appointment Secretary of State for the Public Service. 1989 President Conte carried out an extensive cabinet reshuffle on the 30th, but made few new appointments. Major Abou Camara has been moved from his post as permanent secretary to the ruling Military Committee for National Salvation (CMRN), and takes over as resident minister for Maritime Guinea, based in Kindia.	Diarra Traoré	Li Peng	1995
1996	Mamady Condé		Sidya Touré	Li Peng	2000
2002	Djigui Camara	In 2013 he was ambassador in Moscow, 6, Pomerantsev Pereulok Guninean embassy in Moscow	Lamine Sidimé	Zhu Rongji	
November 13, 2013	Mamady Diaré		Ahmed Tidiane Souaré	Wen Jiabao	July 29, 2014
July 29, 2014	Ibrahima Sory Sow		Mohamed Said Fofana	Li Keqiang	2015
