= Belal Attia =

Egyptian footballer (born 2008)

Personal information
- Full name: Belal Mohamed Ibrahim Attia Khalil
- Date of birth: 1 January 2008 (age 18)
- Height: 1.70 m (5 ft 7 in)
- Position: Midfielder

Team information
- Current team: Racing Club de Santander

Youth career
- Al Ahly

International career
Years	Team	Apps	(Gls)
2024–2025	Egypt U17	20	(8)

Belal Mohamed Ibrahim Attia Khalil (Arabic: بلال عطية; born 1 January 2008) is an Egyptian professional footballer who plays as a midfielder for Racing Club de Santander,on loan from Al Ahly.

== Club career ==
Seen as a promising player in Al Ahly's academy, Attia began to attract interest from European clubs in November 2024, reportedly getting offers from clubs in Germany and Spain. Egyptian media claimed in January 2025 that he had been offered a trial at Barcelona's La Masia academy, as well as with Espanyol. Football news website 365scores later revealed that, having contacted both clubs, no offers for a trial had been made by either. Later in January he was promoted to first-team training for the first time ahead of Al Ahly's Egyptian Premier League match against Pharco.

He was again linked with a move to Europe in May 2025, with an unnamed Danish club reported to have made an offer. This was followed by a trial with German Bundesliga side VfB Stuttgart in the summer of 2025.

== International career ==
Attia was called up to captain Egypt's under-17 team for the 2024 UNAF U-17 Tournament in Algeria, where he was named Man-of-the-Match against Libya before fracturing his right arm in Egypt's 3–1 win against Morocco. Despite not featuring in their last game against Algeria, his contribution was enough to lead Egypt to the title. He represented Egypt again at the 2024 UNAF U-17 Tournament held in Morocco, where he finished top scorer with five goals as Egypt were again crowned champions.

Called up for the 2025 U-17 Africa Cup of Nations, Attia stated in an interview that Egypt had "prepared well" for the tournament, and that they "dream of reaching the World Cup". Following his nation's opening 4–3 loss to South Africa, Attia scored in Egypt's 2–1 loss to Burkina Faso in their second group stage game. Despite finishing third in their group, Attia helped Egypt to the 2025 FIFA U-17 World Cup after they beat Angola 2–1 in the play-off.

At the 2025 FIFA U-17 World Cup, Attia starred in Egypt's opening 4–1 win against Haiti, notching a goal and an assist and being named man-of-the-match. However, he could not help them progress past the round of 32, where they were beaten 3–1 by Switzerland.

== Personal life ==
Attia is the son of Mohamed Attia, president of Egyptian club Pioneers FC. His brother, Moaz, is also a professional footballer, and currently also plays for Al Ahly.
