= Abdourahmane Mbodji =

Senegalese footballer (born 2008)

Personal information
- Date of birth: 22 April 2008 (age 18)
- Place of birth: Richard Toll, Senegal
- Height: 1.77 m (5 ft 10 in)
- Position: Forward

Team information
- Current team: Metz
- Number: 33

Youth career
- Génération Foot

Senior career*
Years	Team	Apps	(Gls)
2024–2026	Génération Foot	40	(16)
2026–	Metz	0	(0)
2026–	Metz B	1	(0)

International career^{‡}
2024	Senegal U17	4	(0)
- * Club domestic league appearances and goals as of 5 September 2026 ‡ National team caps and goals as of 11 April 2025

Abdourahmane Mbodji, also known as Abdourahmane Mbodj (born 22 April 2008) is a Senegalese professional footballer who plays as a forward for Ligue 2 club Metz.

== Club career ==
Born in Richard Toll, Mbodji is a youth product of Génération Foot, where he started playing in the Senegalese league during the 2024–25 season. He proved to be one of the most prolific goalscorer during the following season, leading the charts by March 2026.

One of the most valued prospect of the growing domestic league in Senegal, Mbodj was soon linked to several European clubs.

On 11 August 2026, Mbodji signed a five-year contract with Metz in France.

== International career ==
Mbodji is a youth international for Senegal, having played for the under-17 in the Africa Cup of Nations, helping his team to qualify for the following World cup.
