= 2025–26 Ligue 1 (Senegal) =

Ligue 1
- Season: 2025–26
- Matches: 168
- Goals: 267 (1.59 per match)
- Biggest home win: Casa Sports 4–0 Camberene
- Biggest away win: HLM Dakar 0–5 Goree
- Highest scoring: Dakar Sacré-Coeur 5–2 SONACOS

The 2025—26 Ligue 1 is a season of top-flight football in Senegal. The season began at 25 October 2025 and will conclude at 29 June 2026.

Jaraaf are the defending champions after winning it in 2024-25 season.

== League table ==
As of 3 April 2026

Pos	Team	Pld	W	D	L	GF	GA	GD	Pts	Qualification or relegation
1	AJEL	21	11	7	3	21	13	+8	40	Champions, Qualification to the CAF Champions League
2	Goree	21	9	9	3	24	9	+15	36	Qualification to the CAF Confederation Cup
3	Teungueth	21	8	11	2	15	6	+9	35	
4	Wally Daan	21	7	10	4	19	15	+4	31	
5	Casa Sports	21	5	14	2	22	15	+7	29	
6	Ouakam	21	5	14	2	14	9	+5	29	
7	Génération Foot	21	6	9	6	20	17	+3	27	
8	Jaraaf	21	5	10	6	13	13	0	25	
9	Pikine	21	5	10	6	13	13	0	25	
10	HLM Dakar	21	3	14	4	11	16	−5	23	
11	Guediawaye	21	6	5	10	21	23	−2	23	
12	Stade de Mbour	21	3	13	5	13	15	−2	22	
13	Dakar Sacre-Coeur	21	3	13	5	18	23	−5	22	
14	La Linguere	21	3	11	7	18	24	−6	20	
15	SONACOS	21	3	8	10	13	31	−18	17	Relegation to Ligue 2
16	Camberene	21	2	10	9	12	25	−13	16	Relegation to Ligue 2

Updated to match(es) played on 1 November 2025. Source: Soccerway
Rules for classification: 1) points; 2) goal difference; 3) number of goals scored.

== Statistics ==
As of 3 April 2026

Rank	Player	Club	Goals
1	(Senegal) Mouhamed Diop	AJEL	9
2	(Senegal) Boubacar Coly	Casa Sport	8
2	(Senegal) Abdourahmane Mbodji	Génération Foot	8
2	(Senegal) Fallou Faye	Guediawaye	8
5	(Senegal) Mame Thioune	Wally Daan	6
6	(Senegal) Vieux Cissé	Goree	5
7	(Senegal) Ansumana Samura	Casa Sport	4
7	(Senegal) Lamine Sagna	AJEL	4
7	(Senegal) Abdou Manga	Guediawaye	4
7	(Senegal) Abdoulaye Oualy	Jaraaf	4
7	(Senegal) Ibrahima Dione	HLM Dakar	4
7	(Senegal) Fara Mendy	Dakar Sacré-Coeur	4
7	(Ghana) James Ayertey	Wally Daan	4
7	(Senegal) Idrissa Mbaye	Ouakam	4
