= Ziyad Baha =

Moroccan footballer (born 2009)

Personal information
- Full name: Ziyad Baha Abelhadj
- Date of birth: 10 August 2009 (age 17)
- Place of birth: Málaga, Spain
- Height: 1.83 m (6 ft 0 in)
- Position: Forward

Team information
- Current team: Olympique Marseille

Youth career
- FUS Rabat
- 2023–2024: Málaga
- 2024–2026: Real Betis
- 2026-: Olympique Marseille

International career
Years	Team	Apps	(Gls)
2023–2024	Morocco U15	6	(2)
2023–2024	Morocco U16	5	(2)
2024–	Morocco U17	15	(10)

Ziyad Baha Abelhadj (Arabic: زياد باها; born 10 August 2009) is a professional footballer who plays as a forward for Olympique Marseille. Born in Spain, he is a youth international for Morocco.

== Early and personal life ==
Baha was born in Málaga, Spain, to former Moroccan international footballer Nabil Baha, who was playing for Málaga at the time, and former Spanish-Moroccan model Farah Farabian. His sister, Mayssa Baha, is also a footballer, and currently plays in the academy of Barcelona Femení.

== Club career ==
Baha began his footballing career in Morocco with FUS Rabat, where he won the national youth championship in 2022, before a move to his father's former club, Málaga, in 2023. Following a good season with Málaga's youth sides, scoring 21 goals, he signed for Real Betis in June 2024 on a three-year deal.

He later secured a move to Olympique de Marseille's U-17 side in January 2026, later going up to Olympique Marseille's U-19s in July 2026.

== International career ==
Baha was called up to the Morocco under-17 side for the 2024 UNAF U-17 Tournament in Morocco, where his three goals helped his nation to qualify for the 2025 U-17 Africa Cup of Nations. At the Africa Cup of Nations tournament, again hosted in Morocco, he kept up his goalscoring form, netting twice against Uganda in the opening match.

In the quarter-finals, Baha scored twice against South Africa to earn the Man-of-the-Match award in Morocco's 3–1 win, becoming the first Moroccan to score more than once in a knockout game at the competition. Following Morocco's 0–0 draw in their semi-final match against the Ivory Coast, Baha scored his penalty in the resulting 4–3 shoot-out win, with his father Nabil admitting he was unable to watch his son take the shot. Another successful Baha penalty in Morocco's 4–2 shoot-out win against Mali saw his nation lift the trophy.

== Style of play ==
When his father, Nabil Baha, was asked what it was like to coach his son at the 2025 U-17 Africa Cup of Nations, he described Baha as a "number 10 or number 9", and highlighted that he was playing "phenomenally" against players older than him at the tournament. Baha himself states that he watched clips of his father, who also played as a centre-forward, in order to improve.

He was described by Spanish football website El Desmarque as a "complete forward" noted for his dribbling and ability to create chances with little space to work in. This was shown in Baha's goal in a 5–1 win against Egypt at the 2024 UNAF U-17 Tournament; receiving the ball on the goal-line, he shrugged off defender Hamza El Degawy, before beating Nour Ashraf and then El Degawy again, then rifling the ball beyond goalkeeper Amr Taha. His prolific form at under-17 level for Morocco lead to him being described as a "goal machine".

== Honours ==
Morocco U17

- U-17 Africa Cup of Nations: 2025
