= Nabil Baha =

Moroccan footballer (born 1981)

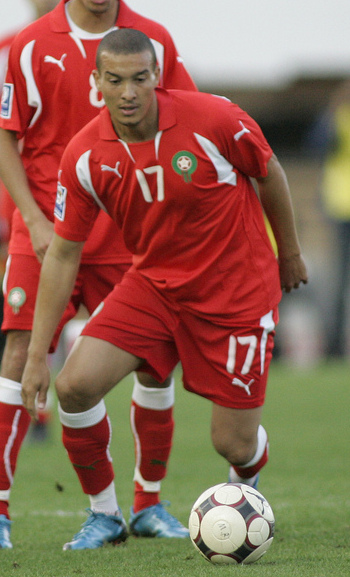
- Baha playing for Morocco in 2009

Personal information
- Full name: Nabil Baha
- Date of birth: 12 August 1981 (age 45)
- Place of birth: Remiremont, France
- Height: 1.85 m (6 ft 1 in)
- Position: Striker

Youth career
- 1994–1998: Épinal
- 1998–2000: Montpellier

Senior career*
Years	Team	Apps	(Gls)
2000–2001	Montpellier B	25	(5)
2001–2004	Naval	84	(24)
2004	Braga B	4	(4)
2004–2005	Braga	10	(1)
2005–2006	Racing Ferrol	37	(8)
2006	Créteil	17	(5)
2007	Ponferradina	20	(9)
2007–2011	Málaga	109	(24)
2011	AEK Athens	9	(0)
2011–2013	Sabadell	32	(5)
2013	Dalian Aerbin	9	(2)
2014–2016	FUS Rabat	41	(6)

International career
2003–2010	Morocco	21	(4)
- * Club domestic league appearances and goals as of 14 August 2016

Nabil Baha (Arabic: نبيل باها; born 12 August 1981) is a professional football manager and former football player who played as a striker. He currently manages the Morocco national under-17 football team.

He started playing for Montpellier in 2000 and spent much of his career in the top divisions of Portugal and Spain, with notable stints at Braga and Málaga.

Born in France, Baha won 21 caps for Morocco over the course of seven years. Since 2024, he is the trainer of Morocco U17.

== Club career ==
Born in Remiremont, Vosges, and with both of his parents hailing from Douar Guerzine near Fes, Baha made his professional debuts with France's Montpellier HSC, then went on to represent Associação Naval 1º de Maio (second division) and S.C. Braga in Portugal, moving to Spain in 2005 and appearing for Racing de Ferrol in the second level. There, in spite of his eight league goals, the Galician club would be relegated.

After a brief return spell to France with lowly US Créteil-Lusitanos, Baha returned to Spain and its second tier in January 2007, scoring nine league goals for SD Ponferradina which would also drop down a level at the season's closure. In the 2007–08 campaign he played for another side in the category, Málaga CF, and, benefitting from several injuries to usual first-choice Salva, finished with ten goals (second-best in the squad) as the Andalusians returned to La Liga after two years.

In the early months of 2008, Baha was subject of a €2 million transfer to FC Steaua București, however he rejected this as he wanted to play in Spain's top flight – he had a clause in his contract allowing him to talk to other clubs if the offer was at least €5 million. In 2008–09 he scored his first goal in the competition, in a 4–0 away routing of Recreativo de Huelva on 5 October 2008; the following month he also found the net, at the Santiago Bernabéu against Real Madrid, but in a 4–3 defeat, and finished the first half of the season as the club's top scorer at eight for a total of nine, tied for best with midfielder Apoño.

On 29 January 2011, free agent Baha joined AEK Athens F.C. of Greece, signing a six-month contract with an option for an extra year. On 30 April he scored his only official goal of the campaign, in a 3–0 win against Atromitos F.C. in the Greek Cup final.

On 18 August 2011, Baha returned to Spain and joined CE Sabadell FC, signing a two-year contract. He was released by the club late in January 2013 and, in July, moved to the Chinese Super League with Dalian Aerbin FC.

== International career ==
A full Moroccan international since February 2003, Baha took part in the 2004 Africa Cup of Nations where the national side finished second to hosts Tunisia, scoring once in a 4–0 semifinal win over Mali.

Due to a dislocated shoulder suffered in the late months of October against Racing de Santander in a Spanish Cup match, Baha failed to win a place in Morocco's final squad for the 2008 Africa Cup of Nations, which was held in Ghana.

== Personal life ==
Baha's children, Ziyad and Mayssa Baha, are also professional footballers.

== Honours ==
=== Player ===
AEK Athens

- Greek Football Cup: 2010–11

FUS Rabat

- Botola Pro: 2015–16
- Moroccan Throne Cup: 2013–14

Morocco

- Africa Cup of Nations runner-up: 2004

=== Manager ===
Morocco U17

- U-17 Africa Cup of Nations: 2025
