= UNAF U-16 Tournament =

- Organiser(s): UNAF
- Founded: 2009; 17 years ago
- Region: North Africa
- Teams: 5 (plus guests)
- Current champions: Tunisia (2nd title)
- Most championships: Tunisia (2 titles)
- Website: unafonline.org
- 2026 UNAF U-16 Tournament

The UNAF U-16 Tournament is the annual international youth football tournament organized by the Union of North African Football (UNAF) for its nations consisting of players under the age of 16. However, the tournament invites teams from other nations.

Tunisia are the tournament's current champions after winning the 2026 tournament, they are also the most successful nation winning the tournament two times.

== Results ==
Ed.	Year	Host	First place game			Third place game		
Ed.	Year	Host	(gold) Champion	Score	(silver) Runner-up	(bronze) Third place	Score	Fourth place
1	2009	Morocco	Tunisia	round-robin	Algeria	Morocco		
2	2015	Morocco	Mauritania	round-robin	Tunisia	Morocco		
3	2026	Tunisia	Tunisia	round-robin	Algeria	Morocco	round-robin	Libya

== Statistics ==
=== Summary ===
Team	Winners	Runners-up	Third place	Fourth place
Tunisia	2 (2009, 2026*)	1 (2015)	—	—
Algeria	—	2 (2009, 2026)	—	—
Morocco	—	—	3 (2009*, 2015*, 2026)	—
Libya	—	—		1 (2026)
Mauritania	1 (2015)	—	—	—

* Hosts
Italic Invited nation

=== Participating nations ===
Team	(Morocco) 2009	(Morocco) 2015	(Tunisia) 2026	Apps.
Algeria	2nd	×	2nd	2
Egypt	×	×	×	0
Libya	×	×	4th	1
Morocco	3rd	3rd	3rd	3
Tunisia	1st	2nd	1st	3
Invited nations
Mauritania	×	1st	×	1

Legend

- 1st – Champions
- 2nd – Runners-up
- 3rd – Third place
- 4th – Fourth place
- 5th – Fifth place
- 6th – Sixth place
- Q – Qualified for upcoming tournament
- × — Did not enter / Withdrew / Disqualified
- — Hosts

== See also ==
- UNAF U-23 Tournament
- UNAF U-20 Tournament
- UNAF U-18 Tournament
- UNAF U-17 Tournament
- UNAF U-15 Tournament
