= Ndjicoura Bomba =

Malian footballer (born 2008)

Personal information
- Full name: Ndjicoura Raymond Bomba
- Date of birth: 12 March 2008 (age 18)
- Place of birth: Mali
- Height: 1.88 m (6 ft 2 in)
- Position: Forward

Team information
- Current team: Bayer Leverkusen

Youth career
- –2026: CS Bamako
- 2026–: Bayer Leverkusen

International career^{‡}
Years	Team	Apps	(Gls)
2025–	Mali U17	9	(7)
- ‡ National team caps and goals as of 18 August 2025

Ndjicoura Raymond Bomba (born 12 March 2008) is a Malian professional footballer who plays as a forward for German Bundesliga club Bayer Leverkusen.

== Club career ==
As a youth player, Bomba joined the youth academy of Malian side Club Sportif de Bamako. Following his stint there, he joined the youth academy of German Bundesliga side Bayer Leverkusen in 2026.

== International career ==
Bomba is a Mali youth international. During April 2025, he played for the Mali national under-17 football team at the 2025 U-17 Africa Cup of Nations.

== Style of play ==
Bomba plays as a forward. English newspaper The Guardian wrote in 2025 that he "combines physical dominance with finesse. Aerially, he is a real threat, attacking every cross with conviction. Yet for a taller striker, his technical ability stands out: quick flicks, backheels and sharp link-up play allow him to knit attacks together and create space for teammates".
