= Emile Witbooi =

South African soccer player (born 2007)

Personal information
- Full name: Emile Amoreece Witbooi
- Date of birth: 28 August 2008 (age 18)
- Place of birth: Northern Cape Kimberley, South Africa
- Height: 1.60 m (5 ft 3 in)
- Positions: Left winger; attacking midfielder

Team information
- Current team: Cape Town City
- Number: 18

Youth career
- 2020-2021: School of Excellence
- 2024–2025: Cape Town City

Senior career*
| Years | Team | Apps | (Gls) |
| 2025– | Cape Town City | 9 | (0) |

International career
| 2024–2023 | South Africa U15 | 7 | (2) |
| 2024–2025 | South Africa U17 | 10 | (4) |
| 2024– | South Africa U20 | 8 | |
- * Club domestic league appearances and goals as of 20:35, 28 August 2026 (UTC)

Emile Amoreece Witbooi (born 28 August 2008) is a South African professional soccer player who plays as an attacking midfielder or winger for National First Division club Cape Town City.

Emile Witbooi was added to the yearly The Guardian list of the best 2008 talents, with him being the only South African on the list.

== Club career ==
A youth product of the Tshwaragano All Stars and the School of Excellence, Witbooi joined the academy of Cape Town City on 20 January 2024. In November, he went on a month-long trial with the Premier League club Chelsea. He made his senior and professional debut with Cape Town City as a substitute in a 2–0 South African Premier Division loss to on 2 March 2025. At 16 years, six months and five days, he was the youngest ever debutant for his club, and the ninth youngest in the history of the league.

== Youth international career ==
Witbooi was part of the South Africa U20s that won the 2024 COSAFA U-20 Cup. Later that year, he played for the South Africa U17s at the 2024 COSAFA Under-17 Championship. In March 2025 he again was called up for the South Africa U17s for the 2025 U-17 Africa Cup of Nations.

== Personal life ==
Witbooi was born in Kimberley, Northern Cape to his mother Avril Witbooi, a civil servant, and Surprise Ralani, his biological father, who was a professional soccer player. On 17 February 2025, Emile Witbooi signed to Roc Nation.

== Honours ==
South Africa U20

- COSAFA U-20 Cup: 2024
