= Hamza Abdelkarim =

Egyptian footballer (born 2008)

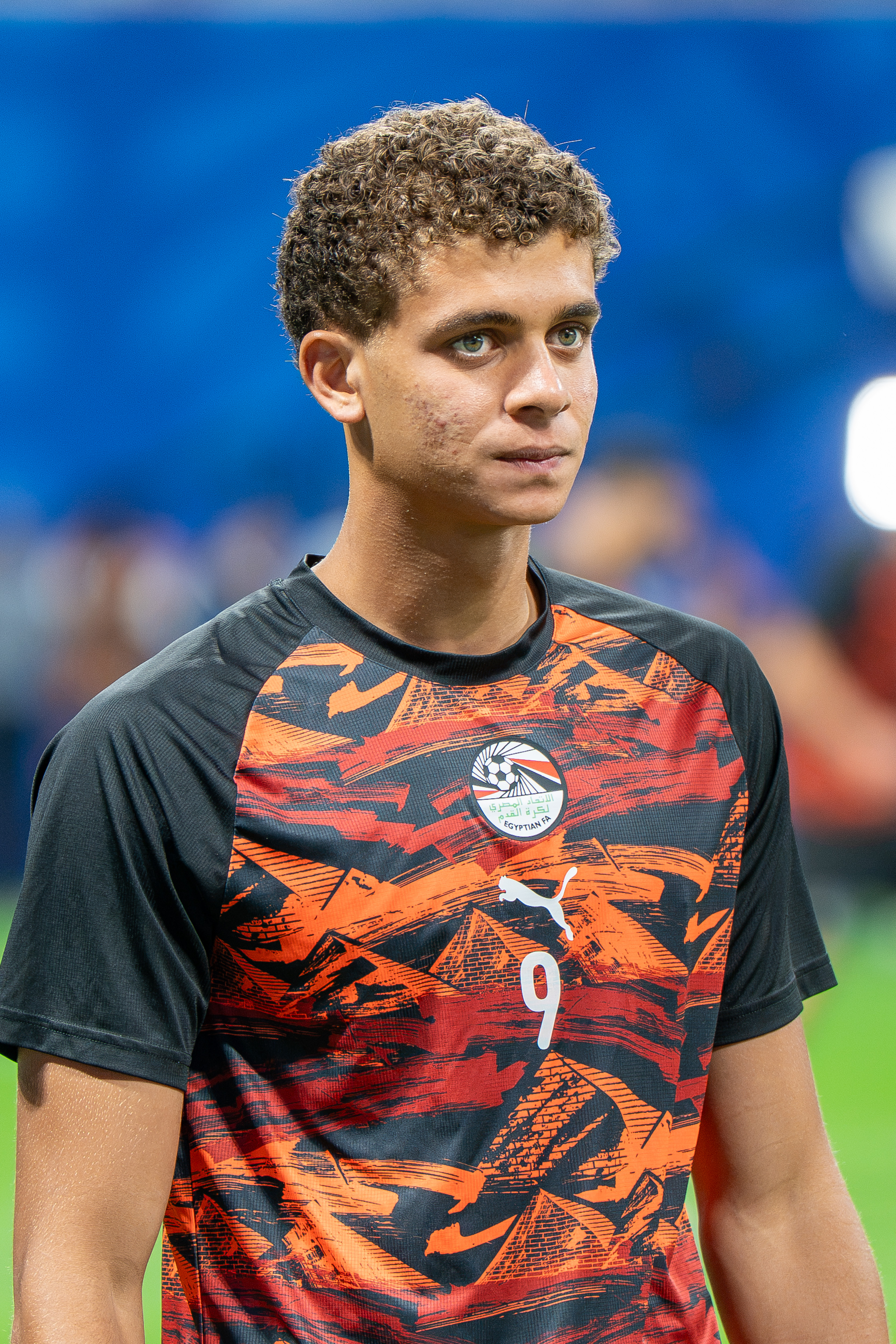
- Abdelkarim with Egypt at the 2026 FIFA World Cup

Personal information
- Full name: Hamza Mohamed Abdelkarim Elsayed Selim
- Date of birth: 1 January 2008 (age 18)
- Place of birth: Cairo, Egypt
- Height: 1.82 m (6 ft 0 in)
- Position: Striker

Team information
- Current team: Barcelona B
- Number: 19

Youth career
- 2020–2026: Al Ahly
- 2026: → Barcelona (loan)

Senior career*
Years	Team	Apps	(Gls)
2025–2026	Al Ahly	1	(0)
2026–	Barcelona B	1	(1)
2026–	Barcelona	2	(0)

International career^{‡}
2024–2025	Egypt U17	19	(12)
2025	Egypt U20	2	(0)
2026–	Egypt	8	(1)
- * Club domestic league appearances and goals as of 31 August 2026 ‡ National team caps and goals as of 17 October 2026

Hamza Mohamed Abdelkarim Elsayed Selim (Note: Arabic: حمزة محمد عبد الكريم السيد سليم) (born 1 January 2008) is an Egyptian professional footballer who plays as a striker for Segunda Federación club Barcelona Atlètic and the Egypt national team.

== Club career ==
=== Al Ahly ===
Abdelkarim joined the academy of Al Ahly in 2020, after passing trials with the club. He was called up to the senior squad for the first time in January 2025, ahead of an Egyptian Premier League match against Pharco. Despite not making his debut in the game, the decision to call him up at such a young age drew praise from Egypt youth national team coach Tamer Hassan, who tipped Abdelkarim to become a key player for Al Ahly. The following month, on 6 February 2025, Abdelkarim made his professional debut for the club, coming on as a late substitute for Emam Ashour in a 2–1 win against Petrojet. In doing so, he became the youngest player to represent the club in the 21st century, surpassing Ramadan Sobhi's record by nine days. The following week, it was reported that Dutch club Feyenoord of the Eredivisie were interested in taking Abdelkarim on trial. In January 2026, he extended his contract with Al Ahly until 2028.

=== Barcelona ===
On 1 February 2026, Abdelkarim joined La Liga side Barcelona on loan until the end of the 2025–26 season, with an option to buy. Administrative issues meant he couldn't play until 8 March, but on his debut with the U-19 side, he scored a goal away at Huesca. Later that year, amid interest from Sporting CP and Bologna, on 10 June, Barcelona made Abdelkarim's transfer from Al Ahly permanent after exercising their purchase option in a deal worth an initial €1.5 million, plus performance-related bonuses.

On 24 July 2026, Abdelkarim made his first-team debut for Barcelona in a pre-season friendly against CE Europa, which Barcelona won 4–1. He then went on to start in the next friendly against Birmingham City a week later, scoring both goals in a 2–2 draw before Barcelona lost 3–2 in the penalty shootout. Abdelkarim played in Barcelona's pre-season matchups against Nottingham Forest, Udinese, Basel, and Al Ahly, scoring four goals in total throughout the summer and earning strong praise from manager Hansi Flick.

Following his pre-season performance, Flick promoted Abdelkarim to Barcelona's first-team squad for the 2026–27 La Liga season, assigning him the number 29 jersey, although he was registered with the reserve team with the number 19 jersey.

Hamza was named as a substitute on the bench for Barcelona's opening match in 2026–27 La Liga against Elche on 23 August 2026. On 31 August, he made his senior debut as a substitute in a 5–2 victory over Rayo Vallecano.

On 9 September 2026, Hamza received his first UEFA Champions League call-up and was named on the substitutes' bench during Barcelona's 5–1 opening stage victory against Feyenoord in 2026–27 UEFA Champions League. Two days later, Barcelona announced that it had reached an agreement with Abdelkarim on a contract that would keep him at the club until 30 June 2030. The agreement was formally signed on 15 September at the offices of Barcelona president Joan Laporta. According to journalist Fabrizio Romano, the new contract includes a €150 million release clause, increased from the €15 million clause in his previous agreement.

== International career ==
Abdelkarim represented Egypt at the 2024 UNAF U17 Tournaments held in Algeria and Morocco, scoring three goals in both tournaments to help his nation win both titles. He was called up again for the 2025 U17 Africa Cup of Nations, but was unable to help Egypt progress beyond the group stage, despite scoring twice. His Man of the Match performance against Angola, including scoring once in Egypt's 2–1 victory, earned his nation a place at the 2025 FIFA U17 World Cup. On 20 May 2026, Abdelkarim was named in Egypt's squad for the 2026 FIFA World Cup. He made his Egypt national team debut on 28 May, as an 86th-minute substitute in a 1–0 friendly win against Russia. On 15 June, he made his World Cup debut as a substitute in a 1–1 draw with Belgium, becoming the youngest Egyptian player to feature at a World Cup, aged 18 years and 165 days. Later that year, on 29 September, he scored his first international goal in a 5–0 away win over South Sudan during the 2027 Africa Cup of Nations qualification.

== Personal life ==
Abdelkarim attended the American International School in Egypt. He is fluent in Egyptian Arabic and English, and was learning Spanish as of 2026.

== Career statistics ==
=== Club ===
As of match played 31 August 2026

Appearances and goals by club, season and competition
Club	Season	League			National cup (Note: Includes Egypt Cup)		League cup (Note: Includes Egyptian League Cup)		Continental		Other		Total	
Club	Season	Division	Apps	Goals	Apps	Goals	Apps	Goals	Apps	Goals	Apps	Goals	Apps	Goals
Al Ahly	2024–25	Egyptian Premier League	1	0	—		—		—		—		1	0
Al Ahly	2025–26	Egyptian Premier League	0	0	1	0	6	0	1 (Note: Appearance in CAF Champions League)	0	0	0	8	0
Al Ahly	Total		1	0	1	0	6	0	1	0	0	0	9	0
Barcelona	2026–27	La Liga	2	0	0	0	0	0	0	0	0	0	2	0
Career total			3	0	1	0	6	0	1	0	0	0	11	0

=== International ===
As of match played 29 September 2026

Appearances and goals by national team and year
National team	Year	Apps	Goals
Egypt	2026	8	1
Total		8	1

Scores and results list Egypt's goal tally first, score column indicates score after each Abdelkarim goal.

List of international goals scored by Hamza Abdelkarim
No.	Date	Venue	Opponent	Score	Result	Competition
1	29 September 2026	Juba Stadium, Juba, South Sudan	South Sudan	5–0	5–0	2027 Africa Cup of Nations qualification

== Honours ==
Al Ahly

- Egyptian Premier League: 2024–25
