= Alynho Haïdara =

Ivorian footballer (born 2008)

Personal information
- Date of birth: 26 July 2008 (age 18)
- Place of birth: Jacqueville, Ivory Coast
- Height: 1.90 m (6 ft 3 in)
- Position: Forward

Team information
- Current team: Mainz 05
- Number: 39

Youth career
- FC Mainz 05 de Jacqueville

Senior career*
Years	Team	Apps	(Gls)
2026–	Mainz 05	0	(0)
2026–	Mainz 05 II	7	(1)

International career^{‡}
2024–2025	Ivory Coast U17	10	(7)
- * Club domestic league appearances and goals as of 24 September 2026 ‡ National team caps and goals as of 10 November 2025

Alynho Haïdara (born 26 July 2008) is an Ivorian professional footballer who plays as a forward for German Bundesliga club Mainz 05.

== Club career ==
Haïdara was born in Jacqueville, Ivory Coast.

As a youth player, Haïdara joined the youth academy of FC Mainz 05 de Jacqueville.

== International career ==
Haïdara is an Ivory Coast youth international. During April 2025, he played for the Ivory Coast national under-17 football team at the 2025 U-17 Africa Cup of Nations.

== Style of play ==
Haïdara plays as a forward. English newspaper The Guardian wrote in 2025 that he "is more than just a classic target man. While he provides a strong presence in the box, he also drifts wide to link play and create openings for midfield runners breaking into space – hallmarks of the modern centre-forward".
