= Seydou Dembélé =

Malian footballer (born 2008)

Personal information
- Date of birth: 16 February 2008 (age 18)
- Place of birth: Mali
- Height: 1.65 m (5 ft 5 in)
- Position: Midfielder

Team information
- Current team: JMG Academy

Youth career
- JMG Academy

International career^{‡}
Years	Team	Apps	(Gls)
2025–	Mali U17	10	(5)
- ‡ National team caps and goals as of 5 November 2025

Seydou Dembélé (born 16 June 2008) is a Malian professional footballer who plays as a midfielder for JMG Academy.

== Club career ==
As a youth player, Dembélé joined the youth academy of Malian side JMG Academy.

== International career ==
Dembélé is a Mali youth international. During April 2025, he played for the Mali national under-17 football team at the 2025 U-17 Africa Cup of Nations.

== Style of play ==
Dembélé plays as a midfielder. African news website AfricaFoot wrote in 2025 that "his lower center of gravity compared to most other players allows him to be more agile, change direction more quickly, and avoid tackles more easily. A true creative genius and an exceptional dribbler".
