= Elvis Torach =

Ugandan footballer

Personal information
- Date of birth: 25 February 2008 (age 18)
- Place of birth: Kitgum, Uganda
- Height: 1.85 m (6 ft 1 in)
- Position: Right-back

Team information
- Current team: AGF

Youth career
- Rwotker Soccer Academy
- Zebra Academy
- El Cambio Academy

Senior career*
Years	Team	Apps	(Gls)
- Masaka Sunshine FC

International career
2025–	Uganda U17	9	(1)
- * Club domestic league appearances and goals

Elvis Torach (born 25 February 2008) is a Ugandan footballer who plays as a right-back for AGF's under-19 team and the Uganda under-17 national team.

== Early life and education ==
Torach was born on 25 February 2008 in Kitgum, Uganda. He attended Blessed Sacrament Senior Secondary School in Kimaanya, Masaka, while developing his football career.

== Club career ==
Torach began his football development at Rwotker Soccer Academy and later trained with Zebra Academy before joining El Cambio Academy in Uganda.

He subsequently played for Masaka Sunshine FC. The Federation of Uganda Football Associations listed him among the defenders in Uganda's provisional squad for the 2025 FIFA U-17 World Cup.

In August 2026, Torach joined Danish club AGF on his 18th birthday. He became the third player from El Cambio Academy to join the Danish club, following fellow Ugandans James Bogere and Hamuza Sengooba. He was initially assigned to AGF's under-19 team.

== International career ==
Torach represented Uganda at under-17 level during the 2025 Africa U-17 Cup of Nations in Morocco. He scored Uganda's goal in a 2–1 defeat against Zambia on 6 April 2025.

Uganda subsequently defeated The Gambia 2–1 in a playoff to qualify for the 2025 FIFA U-17 World Cup in Qatar. Torach started the match and contributed to Uganda's first goal with a pass to James Bogere.

At the 2025 FIFA U-17 World Cup, Torach appeared in all five of Uganda's matches. Uganda reached the round of 16 in its first appearance at a FIFA World Cup tournament and finished 14th among the 48 participating teams.

== Playing style ==
Torach primarily plays as a right-back and has also been described as capable of playing as a right wing-back or in central defence. His strengths have been reported as his pace, stamina, defensive one-on-one ability, crossing and ability to support attacks from wide areas.
