= Slim Bouaskar =

Tunisian footballer (born 2009)

Personal information
- Date of birth: 24 June 2009 (age 17)
- Place of birth: Rome, Italy
- Height: 1.88 m (6 ft 2 in)
- Position: Goalkeeper

Team information
- Current team: Roma U20
- Number: 24

Youth career
- Roma

International career^{‡}
| Years | Team | Apps | (Gls) |
| 2024–2025 | Tunisia U17 | 12 | (0) |
| 2026– | Tunisia U20 | 5 | (0) |
- ‡ National team caps and goals as of 30 September 2026

Slim Bouaskar (Arabic: سليم بوعسكر; born 24 June 2009) is a footballer who plays as a goalkeeper for the under-20 (Campionato Primavera 1) team of Serie A club Roma. Born in Italy, he is a Tunisia youth international.

== Early life ==
Bouaskar was born on 24 June 2009, in Rome, Italy, and is the son of Walid. Growing up, he supported Italian Serie A side Roma and visited Tunisia with his family during the summer.

== Club career ==
As a youth player, Bouaskar joined the academy of Roma in the Italian Serie A, the club he grew up admiring and supporting, at the age of seven, after receiving interest from the academy of fellow Italian Serie A outfit AC Milan.

In 2026, he was promoted to the club's under-18 team. One year later, he was promoted to their under-21 team.

== International career ==
Bouaskar is a Tunisia youth international, having represented the under-17 and under-20 teams, having been born in Italy, he remains eligible to represent his birth nation internationally.

During the spring of 2025, he played for the Tunisia U17s at the 2025 U-17 Africa Cup of Nations, and later the same year, at the 2025 FIFA U-17 World Cup.

== Style of play ==
Tunisian newspaper La Presse de Tunisie wrote in 2026 that he "displayed great personality in his box, anticipation, agility, and reflexes that caught the eye... standing 1.88 meters tall, Bouaskar has also stood out for his impact, leadership, and commanding presence".
