= Asharaf Tapsoba =

Burkinabe footballer (born 2010)

Personal information
- Full name: Asharaf Loukman Tapsoba
- Date of birth: 30 March 2010 (age 16)
- Place of birth: Ziniaré, Burkina Faso
- Height: 1.82 m (6 ft 0 in)
- Position: Forward

Team information
- Current team: Réal du Faso

Youth career
- Élite Sport International de Ziniare
- 2011–: Réal du Faso

International career^{‡}
Years	Team	Apps	(Gls)
2025–	Burkina Faso U17	6	(7)
- ‡ National team caps and goals as of 18 April 2025

Asharaf Loukman Tapsoba (born 30 March 2010) is a Burkinabe professional footballer who plays as a forward for Réal du Faso.

== Early life ==
Tapsoba was born on 30 March 2010 in Burkina Faso. The son of Adama, he started playing football at the age of eight. A native of Ziniaré, Burkina Faso, he grew up regarding Portugal international Cristiano Ronaldo as his football idol.

== Club career ==
As a youth player, Tapsoba joined the youth academy of Burkinabe side Élite Sport International de Ziniare. At the age of eleven, he joined the youth academy of Réal du Faso.

== International career ==
Tapsoba is a Burkina Faso youth international. During April 2025, he played for the Burkina Faso national under-17 football team at the 2025 U-17 Africa Cup of Nations.
