= Ibrahima Sory Sow =

Guinean politician (1941–2026)

Member of the National Assembly of Guinea
- In office 1995–2002

Minister of Health and Public Hygiene
- In office 2010
- President: Sékouba Konaté
- Prime Minister: Jean-Marie Doré

Personal details
- Born: 13 March 1941 Conakry, French Guinea, French West Africa
- Died: 18 October 2026 (aged 85) Dakar, Senegal

Ibrahima Sory Sow (13 March 1941 – 18 October 2026) was a Guinean politician. He served in the National Assembly of Guinea from 1995 to 2002, and as minister of health and public hygiene of Guinea in 2010.

Sow died in Dakar on 18 October 2026, at the age of 85.
