= Mali national under-17 football team =

National under-17 association football team representing Mali

Mali U-17
- Nickname: Les Aigles (The Eagles)
- Association: Malian Football Federation
- Confederation: CAF (Africa)
- Sub-confederation: WAFU (West Africa)
- Head coach: (Mali) Soumaïla Coulibaly
- Home stadium: Stade du 26 Mars
- FIFA code: MLI
First colours	Second colours

U-17 Africa Cup of Nations
- Appearances: 9 (first in 1995)
- Best result: Champions (2015, 2017)

FIFA U-17 World Cup
- Appearances: 7 (first in 1997)
- Best result: Runners-up (2015)

The Mali national under-17 football team is the national under-17 football team of Mali and is controlled by the Malian Football Federation. It represents Mali in international football competitions such as FIFA U-17 World Cup and Africa U-17 Cup of Nations.

== Overview ==
The team has participated in 4 events of the FIFA U-17 World Cup and their best performance came in the 2015 World Cup held in Chile, when Mali reached finished as runners-up. Their best performance at the African level came in the 2015 and the 2017 tournament in Niger and Gabon respectively, when they finished as champions.

== Tournament records ==
=== FIFA U-17 World Cup ===
Year	Round	GP	W	D	L	GS	GA
(China) 1985	Did not enter						
(Canada) 1987	Did not enter						
(Scotland) 1989	Did not enter						
(Italy) 1991	Did not qualify						
(Japan) 1993	Did not qualify						
(Ecuador) 1995	Did not qualify						
(Egypt) 1997	Quarter-finals	4	2	1	1	7	2
(New Zealand) 1999	Group stage	3	0	2	1	0	1
(Trinidad and Tobago) 2001	Quarter-finals	4	2	0	2	5	4
(Finland) 2003	Did not qualify						
(Peru) 2005	Did not qualify						
(South Korea) 2007	Did not qualify						
(Nigeria) 2009	Did not qualify						
(Mexico) 2011	Did not qualify						
(United Arab Emirates) 2013	Did not qualify						
(Chile) 2015	Runners-up	7	5	1	1	12	4
(India) 2017	Fourth place	7	4	0	3	16	11
(Brazil) 2019	Did not qualify						
(Indonesia) 2023	Third place	7	5	0	2	18	4
(Qatar) 2025	Round of 16	5	3	0	2	10	7
(Qatar) 2026	In progress	1	1	0	0	3	0
(Qatar) 2027	TBD						
(Qatar) 2028	TBD						
(Qatar) 2029	TBD						
Total:8/21	Runners-up	38	22	4	12	71	33

=== U-17 Africa Cup of Nations record ===
U-17 Africa Cup of Nations
Year	Round	Position	GP	W	D*	L	GS	GA
(Mali) 1995	Fourth place	4th	5	1	0	4	5	8
(Botswana) 1997	Runners-up	2nd	5	2	2	1	4	3
(Guinea) 1999	Third Place	3rd	5	2	2	1	6	5
(Seychelles) 2001	Third Place	3rd	4	2	1	1	11	3
(Eswatini) 2003	Did not qualify							
(The Gambia) 2005	Group stage	6th	3	1	0	2	7	7
(Togo) 2007	Did not qualify							
(Algeria) 2009	Did not qualify							
(Rwanda) 2011	Group stage	8th	3	0	0	3	2	5
(Morocco) 2013	Did not qualify							
(Niger) 2015	Champions	1st	5	4	1	0	9	4
(Gabon) 2017	Champions	1st	5	3	2	0	9	2
(Tanzania) 2019	Did not qualify							
(Algeria) 2023	Fourth place	4th	5	3	1	1	7	2
(Morocco) 2025	Runners-up	2nd	6	3	3	1	9	3
Total	9/15	Champions	40	18	9	13	60	43

*Draws include knockout matches decided on penalty kicks.

== Current squad ==
The following players were named in the squad for the 2025 U-17 Africa Cup of Nations.

No.	Pos.	Player	Date of birth (age)	Club
1	GK	Lamine Sinaba	5 April 2008 (aged 16)	(Malian Football Federation) Académie Cherifla
2	DF	Mahamadou Konaté	8 June 2009 (aged 15)	(Malian Football Federation) FC Diarra
3	MF	Ibrahim Diakite	10 July 2008 (aged 16)	(Malian Football Federation) JMG Academy
4	DF	Tièmoko Berthe	17 February 2008 (aged 17)	(Malian Football Federation) Étoiles du Mandé
5	DF	Aboubacar Siriki Camara	11 August 2010 (aged 14)	(Malian Football Federation) AFE
6	MF	Issa Tounkara	20 June 2008 (aged 16)	(Malian Football Federation) Étoiles du Mandé
7	FW	Soungalo Coulibaly	1 May 2008 (aged 16)	(Malian Football Federation) Yeelen Olympique
8	MF	Issa Koné	11 October 2008 (aged 16)	(Malian Football Federation) Africa Foot
9	FW	Ndjicoura Raymond Bomba	12 March 2008 (aged 17)	(Malian Football Federation) CSB
10	MF	Seydou Dembélé	16 February 2008 (aged 17)	(Malian Football Federation) JMG Academy
11	FW	Ousmane Savane	20 February 2008 (aged 17)	(Malian Football Federation) AS Bamako
12	DF	Souleymane Doumbia	27 February 2008 (aged 17)	(Malian Football Federation) Derby Académie
13	FW	Soumaila Fané	25 December 2009 (aged 15)	(Malian Football Federation) ASBD Sikasso
14	DF	Dramane Siaka Doumbia	12 August 2008 (aged 16)	(Malian Football Federation) Africa Foot
15	MF	Yaya Fofana	2 November 2008 (aged 16)	(Malian Football Federation) Africa Foot
16	GK	Ianis Sacko	30 July 2009 (aged 15)	(French Football Federation) US Quevilly RM
17	MF	Mahamadou Traoré	17 November 2009 (aged 15)	(Malian Football Federation) Players Dreams
18	DF	Mohamed Doumbia	15 December 2008 (aged 16)	(Malian Football Federation) Yeelen Olympique
19	FW	Mohamed Dhiarrah	18 November 2008 (aged 16)	(Malian Football Federation) Djoliba AC
20	DF	Lamine Sidiki Keita	20 November 2009 (aged 15)	(Malian Football Federation) ASBD Sikasso
21	GK	Mamadou Souleymane Sacko	16 September 2009 (aged 15)	(Malian Football Federation) ABM Foot
22	DF	Cheickna Hamala Coulibaly	25 January 2010 (aged 15)	(Malian Football Federation) Académie Cherifla
23	FW	Moussa Mamadou Djikine	5 February 2009 (aged 16)	(French Football Federation) FC Massy 91
24	GK	Cheick Oumar Diarra	19 October 2010 (aged 14)	(Malian Football Federation) FC Diarra

== Head-to-head record ==
The following table shows Mali's head-to-head record in the FIFA U-17 World Cup.

Opponent	Pld	W	D	L	GF	GA	GD	Win %
Argentina	2	1	0	1	4	2	+2	50.00
Austria	1	0	0	1	0	3	−3	0.00
Australia	1	0	0	1	0	1	−1	0.00
Belgium	2	1	1	0	3	1	+2	50.00
Brazil	2	0	1	1	0	2	−2	0.00
Canada	1	1	0	0	5	1	+4	100.00
Costa Rica	1	1	0	0	2	0	+2	100.00
Croatia	1	1	0	0	1	0	+1	100.00
Ecuador	1	1	0	0	2	1	+1	100.00
France	1	0	0	1	1	2	−1	0.00
Germany	2	0	2	0	0	0	+0	0.00
Ghana	1	1	0	0	2	1	+1	100.00
Honduras	1	1	0	0	3	0	+3	100.00
Iran	1	1	0	0	1	0	+1	100.00
Iraq	1	1	0	0	5	1	+4	100.00
Mexico	2	2	0	0	8	1	+7	100.00
Morocco	2	1	0	1	3	3	+0	50.00
Nigeria	1	0	0	1	0	2	−2	0.00
New Zealand	3	3	0	0	10	1	+9	100.00
North Korea	1	1	0	0	3	0	+3	100.00
Paraguay	2	0	0	2	3	5	−2	0.00
Saudi Arabia	1	1	0	0	2	0	+2	100.00
Spain	3	0	0	3	1	5	−4	0.00
Turkey	1	1	0	0	3	0	+3	100.00
Uzbekistan	1	1	0	0	3	0	+3	100.00
Zambia	1	1	0	0	3	1	+2	100.00
Total	37	21	4	12	68	33	+35	56.76

== See also ==
- Mali national football team
- Mali national under-20 football team
- Mali women's national football team
