= Anisse Saidi =

Tunisian footballer (born 2008)

Personal information
- Full name: Anisse Hassouna Daylyn Saidi
- Date of birth: 20 June 2008 (age 18)
- Place of birth: Camden, New Jersey, US
- Position: Forward

Team information
- Current team: Benfica (on loan from San Diego FC)

Youth career
- –2024: Philadelphia Union

Senior career*
Years	Team	Apps	(Gls)
2024	Philadelphia Union II	1	(0)
2025–	San Diego FC	3	(0)
2026	→ Monterey Bay FC (loan)	6	(1)
2026–	→ Benfica (loan)	0	(0)

International career
2023–2024	United States U15	6	(5)
2024–	Tunisia U17	10	(5)
- * Club domestic league appearances and goals as of 16 June 2026

Anisse Saidi (Arabic: أنيس السعيدي; born 20 June 2008) is a professional footballer who plays as a forward for Benfica, on loan from Major League Soccer club San Diego FC. Born in the United States, he represents Tunisia at youth level.

== Early life ==
Saidi was born on 20 June 2008 in Camden, New Jersey, United States. Born to a Tunisian father and an American mother, he is the nephew of Tunisia international Khaled Saidi. He was raised in Cherry Hill, New Jersey.

== Club career ==
As a youth player, Saidi joined the youth academy of American side Philadelphia Union and started his senior career with the club's reserve team, where he received interest from Portuguese side Sporting. In 2025, he signed for American side San Diego FC.

On 16 June 2026, Saidi was loaned to USL Championship side Monterey Bay FC through the end of the 2026 USL Championship season.

== Style of play ==
Saidi plays as a forward. The news website Philly Sports Network wrote in 2024 that his "ball control is great... can finish from all angles and distances in a variety of situations".
