= Morocco national under-17 football team =

National under-17 association football team representing Morocco

Morocco U-17
- Nickname(s): Atlas Lions أُسُود الأطلس ⵜⴰⵔⴰⴱⴱⵓⵓⵜ ⴰⵏⴰⵎⵓⵔ ⵏ ⵍⵎⵖⵔⵉⴱ
- Association: Royal Moroccan Football Federation
- Confederation: CAF (Africa)
- Head coach: (Portugal) Tiago Lima Pereira
- Home stadium: Various
- FIFA code: MAR
First colours	Second colours

First international
- Tunisia 0–2 Morocco (Tunisia; 2 July 1988)

Biggest win
- Morocco 16–0 New Caledonia (Doha, Qatar; 9 November 2025)

Biggest defeat
- Portugal 6–0 Morocco (Doha, Qatar; 6 November 2025)

FIFA U-17 World Cup
- Appearances: 3 (first in 2013)
- Best result: Quarter-finals (2023, 2025)

U-17 Africa Cup of Nations
- Appearances: 4 (first in 2013)
- Best result: Champions (2025)

Arab Cup U-17
- Appearances: 3 (first in 2011)
- Best result: Runners-Up (2022)
Medal record
U-17 Africa Cup of Nations
Gold medal – first place	2025 Morocco
Silver medal – second place	2023 Algeria
Arab Cup U-17
Silver medal – second place	2022 Algeria
Bronze medal – third place	2012 Tunisia

The Morocco national under-17 football team represents Morocco in international under-17 football competitions and is governed by the Royal Moroccan Football Federation (FRMF). The team competes in the Africa U-17 Cup of Nations, Arab Cup U-17 and the FIFA U-17 World Cup.

== History ==
On 8 September 2022, Morocco lost the 2022 Arab Cup, after losing in penalties to Algeria.

In the 2023 Africa Cup of Nations, Morocco had a successful run, securing a spot in the knockout stages by finishing atop their group. They demonstrated their prowess by winning two matches and suffering a single defeat. In the subsequent match against Algeria, the Moroccan team emerged triumphant with a remarkable 3-0 victory, solidifying their qualification for the 2023 FIFA U-17 World Cup. Moving on to the semi-finals, they faced off against Mali in an intense battle that ended with a nail-biting 6-5 victory for Morocco on penalties, thanks to a heroic save by goalkeeper Taha Benrhozil. Ultimately, Morocco finished the tournament in second place after a closely contested final, ending with a 2-1 loss. However, their commendable conduct throughout the competition earned them the fair play award, a testament to their sportsmanship.

In the 2023 FIFA U-17 World Cup, Morocco qualified to the knockout stages after finishing top in the group stages winning two matches and losing one. In the Round of 16, they defeated Iran on penalties. They were eliminated in the quarter-finals after losing to Mali 1-0, a remeet after the 2023 AFCON U-17 took place in Algeria.

In the 2025 Africa Cup of Nations, Morocco qualified to the knockout stages after finishing top in the group stages winning two matches and drawing one. They defeated South Africa 3-1 in the Round of 16. In the Semi-final, Morocco drew 0-0 with Ivory Coast and secured victory through a penalty shootout. In the Final, Morocco defeated Mali in penalties to claim their first ever continental title.

In November 2025, Morocco achieved the largest winning margin ever recorded in an 11-a-side FIFA World Cup match, defeating New Caledonia 16–0 at the 2025 FIFA U-17 World Cup in Qatar. The result established a new FIFA tournament record for the highest score in any World Cup age category.

== Tournament records ==
=== CAF U-16 and U-17 World Cup Qualifiers record ===
CAF U-16 and U-17 World Cup Qualifiers
Appearances: 1 / 5
Year	Round	Position	Pld	W	D	L	GF	GA
1985	did not participate							
1987	did not participate							
1989	Second Round		4	2	1	1	3	2
1991	Disqualified							
1993	did not participate							
Total	1/5	Second Round	4	2	1	1	3	2

=== FIFA U-17 World Cup ===
Year	Result	Position	Pld	W	D	L	GF	GA
(China) 1985	Did not participate							
(Canada) 1987	Did not participate							
(Scotland) 1989	Did not qualify							
(Italy) 1991	Disqualified							
(Japan) 1993	Did not participate							
(Ecuador) 1995	Did not qualify							
(Egypt) 1997	Did not qualify							
(New Zealand) 1999	Did not qualify							
(Trinidad and Tobago) 2001	Did not qualify							
(Finland) 2003	Did not qualify							
(Peru) 2005	Did not qualify							
(South Korea) 2007	Did not qualify							
(Nigeria) 2009	Did not enter							
(Mexico) 2011	Did not qualify							
(United Arab Emirates) 2013	Round of 16	10th	4	2	1	1	8	5
(Chile) 2015	Did not qualify							
(India) 2017	Did not qualify							
(Brazil) 2019	Did not qualify							
(Indonesia) 2023	Quarter-finals	7th	5	2	1	2	6	5
(Qatar) 2025	Quarter-finals	8th	6	2	1	3	21	13
(Qatar) 2026	In progress	TBD	1	1	0	0	6	0
(Qatar) 2027	To be determined							
(Qatar) 2028	To be determined							
(Qatar) 2029	To be determined							
Total:4/24	Quarter-finals	7th	16	7	3	6	41	23

=== U-17 Africa Cup of Nations record ===
U-17 Africa Cup of Nations
Year	Round	Position	Pld	W	D	L	GF	GA
(Mali) 1995	did not qualify							
(Botswana) 1997	did not qualify							
(Guinea) 1999	did not qualify							
(Seychelles) 2001	did not qualify							
(Eswatini) 2003	did not qualify							
(The Gambia) 2005	did not qualify							
(Togo) 2007	did not qualify							
(Algeria) 2009	did not enter							
(Rwanda) 2011	did not qualify							
(Morocco) 2013	Fourth Place	4th	5	2	2	1	10	5
(Niger) 2015	did not qualify							
(Gabon) 2017	did not qualify							
(Tanzania) 2019	Group stage	7th	3	0	1	2	2	4
(Algeria) 2023	Runners-up	2nd	6	3	1	2	8	5
(Morocco) 2025	Champions	1st	6	3	3	0	11	1
(Morocco) 2026	Fourth Place	4th	6	3	2	1	7	6
(Morocco) 2027	TBD							
Total	Champions	5/14	26	11	9	6	38	21

=== Arab Cup U-17 record ===
Arab Cup U-17
Appearances: 2 / 3
Year	Round	Position	Pld	W	D	L	GF	GA
(Saudi Arabia) 2011	Group stage	5th	3	1	1	1	3	3
(Tunisia) 2012	Third Place	3rd	4	2	1	1	4	2
(Qatar) 2014	did not participate							
(Morocco) 2021	Cancelled							
(Algeria) 2022	Runners-Up	2nd	6	4	1	1	7	3
Total	3/3	Third Place	13	7	3	3	14	7

=== UNAF U-17 Tournament record ===
UNAF U-17 Tournament
Appearances: 11 / 13
Year	Round	Position	Pld	W	D	L	GF	GA
(Algeria) 2006	Did not participate							
(Morocco) 2007	Champions	1st	3	2	1	0	5	1
(Tunisia) Mar 2008	Third Place	3rd	3	1	0	2	3	5
(Algeria) Dec 2008	Fifth Place	5th	4	1	1	2	3	4
(Tunisia) 2009	Runners-up	2nd	3	1	1	1	3	3
(Tunisia) 2010	Fourth Place	4th	3	0	1	2	1	5
(Morocco) 2011	Champions	1st	2	1	1	0	2	0
(Tunisia) Mar 2012	Did not participate							
(Morocco) Dec 2012	Third Place	3rd	2	1	0	1	1	1
(Morocco) 2014	Runners-up	2nd	2	1	0	1	3	4
(Morocco) 2016	Fifth Place	5th	3	1	1	1	7	5
(Morocco) 2017	Fourth Place	4th	3	0	1	2	4	5
(Tunisia) Aug 2018	Champions	1st	3	3	0	0	7	2
(Morocco) Dec 2018	Runners-up	2nd	3	2	1	0	11	2
(Algeria) 2021	Withdrew							
(Algeria) Mar 2022	Runners-up	2nd	4	2	1	1	4	1
(Algeria) Nov 2022	Champions	1st	3	3	0	0	5	1
(Algeria) Apr 2024	Third Place	3rd	4	1	2	1	5	6
(Morocco) Nov 2024	Runners-up	2nd	4	2	2	0	10	4
(Libya) Apr 2026	Champions	1st	4	4	0	0	10	2
(Tunisia) Nov 2026	To be determined							
Total	5 Titles	17/21	53	26	13	14	84	51

- Red border color indicates tournament was held on home soil.

*Draws include knockout matches decided on penalty kicks.

=== UNAF U-16 Tournament ===
UNAF U-16 Tournament record
Year	Round	Position	Pld	W	D*	L	GF	GA
(Morocco) 2009	Third Place	3rd	2	0	2	0	2	2
(Morocco) 2015	Third Place	3rd	2	0	1	1	2	4
(Tunisia) 2026	Third Place	3rd	3	0	2	1	4	5
Total	Third Place	3/3	7	0	5	2	8	11

== Current squad ==
The following players were called up to the squad for the 2026 U-17 Africa Cup of Nations to be played between 13 May and 2 June 2026.

No.	Pos.	Player	Date of birth (age)	Club
	GK	Mohamed Harouch		(Royal Moroccan Football Federation) Mohamed VI
	GK	Adam El Maach	16 March 2009 (age 17)	(Royal Dutch Football Association) Helmond Sport
	GK	Rayan Yaakoubi	29 April 2009 (age 17)	(Royal Belgian Football Association) Gent
	DF	Ayman Ezzarky		(Royal Moroccan Football Federation) Mohamed VI
	DF	Adam Ellaky	9 January 2009 (age 17)	(Royal Moroccan Football Federation) Wydad AC
	DF	Marouane Bentaleb	16 May 2009 (age 17)	(Royal Dutch Football Association) Ajax
	DF	Mehdi Amehmoul	4 April 2009 (age 17)	(Royal Moroccan Football Federation) Raja CA
	DF	Adam Soudi	18 March 2009 (age 17)	(French Football Federation) Toulouse
	DF	Mohamed Habib Zinbi	17 November 2009 (age 17)	(Royal Belgian Football Association) Anderlecht
	DF	Wael Jolissaint	17 December 2009 (age 16)	(Swiss Football Association) Bejune
	DF	Hamza Chllali	7 May 2009 (age 17)	(Royal Moroccan Football Federation) FUS Rabat
	DF	Ayman Tahri		(Royal Moroccan Football Federation) RS Berkane
	DF	Adam Alioui	26 June 2009 (age 17)	(French Football Federation) Lyon
	MF	Luis Velilles	28 April 2009 (age 17)	(Royal Spanish Football Federation) Alavés
	MF	Ibrahim Faik	22 May 2009 (age 17)	(Royal Dutch Football Association) Feyenoord
	MF	Ilian Hadidi	6 March 2009 (age 17)	(Royal Belgian Football Association) Standard Liège
	MF	Oualid Ibn Salah	5 November 2009 (age 17)	(Royal Moroccan Football Federation) Mohamed VI
	MF	Imran Talai	3 February 2009 (age 17)	(Royal Dutch Football Association) Ajax
	MF	Yahya Saidi	19 June 2009 (age 17)	(Royal Moroccan Football Federation) FUS Rabat
	FW	Ismail El Aoud	1 July 2009 (age 17)	(Royal Spanish Football Federation) Valencia
	FW	Adam Boughazir	27 September 2009 (age 17)	(Royal Moroccan Football Federation) Mohamed VI
	FW	Ibrahim Rabbaj	3 January 2009 (age 17)	(The Football Association) Chelsea
	FW	Rayan Khadraoui	28 January 2009 (age 17)	(German Football Association) Mönchengladbach
	FW	Rami Lougmani	25 May 2009 (age 17)	(Royal Belgian Football Association) Anderlecht
	FW	Adnan El Boujjoufi	23 July 2009 (age 17)	(Royal Dutch Football Association) Go Ahead Eagles
	FW	Mohamed Amine Moustache	25 January 2009 (age 17)	(Royal Belgian Football Association) OH Leuven

== Honours ==
=== International ===
- FIFA U-17 World Cup:

Quarter-finals: 2023, 2025

=== Continental ===
- U-17 Africa Cup of Nations

Winners (1): 2025
Runners-up (1): 2023

=== Regional ===
- Arab Cup U-17

Runners-up (1): 2022
Third Place (1): 2012

- UNAF U-17 Tournament:

Winners (5): 2007, 2011, Aug 2018, Nov 2022, Apr 2026
Runners-up (5): 2009, 2014, Dec 2018, Mar 2022, Nov 2024
Third Place (3): Mar 2008, Dec 2012, Apr 2024

- UNAF U-16 Tournament:

Third Place (3): 2009, 2015, 2026

== Previous squads ==
FIFA U-17 World Cup squads

- 2013 FIFA U-17 WC squad
- 2023 FIFA U-17 WC squad
- 2025 FIFA U-17 WC squad

U-17 Africa Cup of Nations squads

- 2013 CAN U-17 squad
- 2019 CAN U-17 squad
- 2023 CAN U-17 squad
- 2025 CAN U-17 squad

== Head-to-head record ==
The following table shows Morocco's head-to-head record in the FIFA U-17 World Cup.

Opponent	Pld	W	D	L	GF	GA	GD	Win %
Croatia	1	1	0	0	3	1	+2	100.00
Ecuador	1	0	0	1	0	2	−2	0.00
Indonesia	1	1	0	0	3	1	+2	100.00
Iran	1	0	1	0	1	1	+0	0.00
Ivory Coast	1	0	0	1	1	2	−1	0.00
Japan	1	0	0	1	0	2	−2	0.00
Mali	1	0	0	1	0	1	−1	0.00
New Caledonia	1	1	0	0	16	0	+16	100.00
Panama	2	2	0	0	6	2	+4	100.00
Portugal	1	0	0	1	0	6	−6	0.00
Uzbekistan	1	0	1	0	0	0	+0	0.00
Total	12	5	2	5	30	18	+12	41.67
