= Tunisia national under-18 football team =

Men's national association football team representing Tunisia

Tunisia U-18
- Nickname(s): نسور قرطاج (Eagles of Carthage)
- Association: Tunisian Football Federation
- Other affiliation: UAFA (Arab World)
- Confederation: CAF (Africa)
- Sub-confederation: UNAF (North Africa)
- Home stadium: Hammadi Agrebi Stadium
- FIFA code: TUN
First colours	Second colours	Third colours

UNAF U-18 Tournament
- Appearances: 1 (first in 2017)
- Best result: Champions (2017)

The Tunisia national under-18 football team has represented Tunisia in men's international association football for players aged 18 or under. The team is administered by the Tunisian Football Federation (TFF), which governs football in Tunisia. On a continental level, the team competes under the Confederation of African Football (CAF), which governs associate football in Africa, and is also affiliated with FIFA for global competitions. Additionally, the team is a member of the Union of North African Football (UNAF) and the Union of Arab Football Associations (UAFA). The team is colloquially known as Eagles of Carthage by fans and the media, with the bald eagle serving as its symbol. Their home kit is primarily white and their away kit is red, which is a reference to the national flag of the country.

The team was active in 2017 during the UNAF U-18 Tournament held in Tunisia. After two victories over Libya and Morocco and a defeat against Algeria, Tunisia won the title after collecting 6 points. The team withdrew from the next edition held in Egypt.

== Competitive Records ==
Champions Runners-up Third place Fourth place

- Red border color indicates tournament was held on home soil.

=== Mediterranean Games ===
Mediterranean Games record
Year	Round	Position	Pld	W	D*	L	GF	GA
1951 – 1987	See Tunisia national football team							
1991 – 2013	See Tunisia national under-20 football team							
(Spain) 2018	Did not enter							
(Algeria) 2022	Did not enter							
Since 2026	See Tunisia national under-20 football team							
Total	–	0/2	–	–	–	–	–	–

=== UNAF U-18 Tournament ===
UNAF U-18 Tournament record
Year	Round	Position	Pld	W	D*	L	GF	GA
(Tunisia) 2017	Champions	1st	3	2	0	1	3	1
(Egypt) 2019	Withdrew							
Total	1 Title	2/3	3	2	0	1	3	1

== Honours ==
- UNAF U-18 Tournament

(gold) Champions (1): 2017

== See also ==
- Tunisia national football team
- Tunisia A' national football team
- Tunisia national under-23 football team
- Tunisia national under-20 football team
- Tunisia national under-17 football team
- Tunisia national under-15 football team
