= Football at the 2018 Mediterranean Games =

Men's football tournament at the 2018 Mediterranean Games

Tournament details
- Host country: Spain
- City: Tarragona
- Dates: 22–30 June
- Teams: 9 (from 2 confederations)
- Venues: 3 (in 3 host cities)

Final positions
- Champions: Spain (3rd title)
- Runners-up: Italy
- Third place: Morocco
- Fourth place: Greece

Tournament statistics
- Matches played: 15
- Goals scored: 47 (3.13 per match)
- Top scorer: (Spain) Abel Ruiz (7 goals)

Football at the 2018 Mediterranean Games took place between 22 June and 30 June at the Estadi Municipal de Reus, Estadi Municipal de La Pobla de Mafumet and Estadi Municipal de Calafell. Associations affiliated with FIFA were invited to send their men's U-18, U-19 and U-21 national teams. There was no women's tournament on this occasion.

== Participating nations ==
Nine nations have applied to compete in men's tournament, one more than at the previous games. None of the Asian nations opted to compete.

Men

| Federation | Nation |
|---|---|
| CAF Africa | Algeria U18; Libya U18; Morocco U18 |
| AFC Asia | None |
| UEFA Europe | Bosnia and Herzegovina U18; France U18; Greece U18; Italy U18; Spain U18 (hosts); Turkey U18 |

== Venues ==
3 stadiums were allocated to host the matches.

| Stadium | City | Capacity |
|---|---|---|
| Estadi Municipal de Reus | Reus | 4,500 |
| Estadi Municipal de La Pobla de Mafumet | La Pobla de Mafumet | 707 |
| Estadi Municipal de Calafell | Calafell | 690 |

== Group stage ==
All times are local (UTC+2).

=== Group A ===
| Pos | Team | Pld | W | D | L | GF | GA | GD | Pts | Qualification |
|---|---|---|---|---|---|---|---|---|---|---|
| 1 | Spain (H) | 2 | 2 | 0 | 0 | 6 | 2 | +4 | 6 | Semifinals |
| 2 | Algeria | 2 | 1 | 0 | 1 | 3 | 4 | −1 | 3 | |
| 3 | Bosnia and Herzegovina | 2 | 0 | 0 | 2 | 1 | 4 | −3 | 0 | |

Source: Tarragona 2018
(H) Hosts
22 June 2018
13:00

| Algeria | 1–4 | Spain |
|---|---|---|
| Boutrif 74' | Report | Ruiz 6', 17'; S. Gómez 12', 21' |

Estadi Municipal de Calafell, Calafell
Referee: Halil Umut Meler (Turkey)

24 June 2018
20:00

| Spain | 2–1 | Bosnia and Herzegovina |
|---|---|---|
| Ruiz 7'; N. Díaz 76' | Report | Hasić 50' |

Estadi Municipal de Reus, Reus
Referee: Hicham Tiazi (Morocco)

26 June 2018
17:00

| Algeria | 2–0 | Bosnia and Herzegovina |
|---|---|---|
| Boutrif 55'; Zorgane 82' | Report |

Estadi Municipal de La Pobla de Mafumet, La Pobla de Mafumet
Referee: Jérôme Brisard (France)

=== Group B ===
| Pos | Team | Pld | W | D | L | GF | GA | GD | Pts | Qualification |
|---|---|---|---|---|---|---|---|---|---|---|
| 1 | Italy | 2 | 1 | 1 | 0 | 8 | 2 | +6 | 4 | Semifinals |
| 2 | Morocco | 2 | 1 | 1 | 0 | 4 | 3 | +1 | 4 | Semifinals |
| 3 | Libya | 2 | 0 | 0 | 2 | 1 | 8 | −7 | 0 | |

Source: Tarragona 2018
22 June 2018
10:00

| Italy | 2–2 | Morocco |
|---|---|---|
| Vignato 62'; Merola 78' | Report | Rharib 19'; Ounahi 68' |

Estadi Municipal de Calafell, Calafell
Referee: Irfan Peljto (Bosnia and Herzegovina)

24 June 2018
11:00

| Morocco | 2–1 | Libya |
|---|---|---|
| S. Drouich 6'; Mourid 64' | Report | Shaldun 50' |

Estadi Municipal de Reus, Reus
Referee: Said Aouina (Algeria)

26 June 2018
20:00

| Libya | 0–6 | Italy |
|---|---|---|
| | Report | Rauti 4', 43' (pen.); Merola 28', 87', 90+1'; Gavioli 44' |

Estadi Municipal de La Pobla de Mafumet, La Pobla de Mafumet
Referee: Ioannis Papadopoulos (Greece)

=== Group C ===
| Pos | Team | Pld | W | D | L | GF | GA | GD | Pts | Qualification |
|---|---|---|---|---|---|---|---|---|---|---|
| 1 | Greece | 2 | 2 | 0 | 0 | 4 | 1 | +3 | 6 | Semifinals |
| 2 | France | 2 | 1 | 0 | 1 | 2 | 3 | −1 | 3 | |
| 3 | Turkey | 2 | 0 | 0 | 2 | 0 | 2 | −2 | 0 | |

Source: Tarragona 2018
22 June 2018
13:00

| France | 1–0 | Turkey |
|---|---|---|
| Soumaré 88' | Report |

Estadi Municipal de La Pobla de Mafumet, La Pobla de Mafumet
Referee: Srđan Jovanović (Serbia)

24 June 2018
20:00

| Turkey | 0–1 | Greece |
|---|---|---|
| | Report | Emmanouilidis 68' |

Estadi Municipal de Calafell, Calafell
Referee: Xavier Estrada Fernández (Spain)

26 June 2018
20:00

| France | 1–3 | Greece |
|---|---|---|
| Gassama 75' | Report | Emmanouilidis 48'; Gkargkalatzidis 90+1'; Voilis 90+5' |

Estadi Municipal de Reus, Reus
Referee: Marco Di Bello (Italy)

=== Ranking of second-placed teams ===
| Pos | Team | Pld | W | D | L | GF | GA | GD | Pts | Qualification |
|---|---|---|---|---|---|---|---|---|---|---|
| 1 | Morocco | 2 | 1 | 1 | 0 | 4 | 3 | +1 | 4 | Semifinals |
| 2 | Algeria | 2 | 1 | 0 | 1 | 3 | 4 | −1 | 3 | |
| 3 | France | 2 | 1 | 0 | 1 | 2 | 3 | −1 | 3 | |

Source: Tarragona 2018

== Classification stage ==
7th and 5th place brackets

| Seventh place |
| 29 June – La Pobla de Mafumet |
| Turkey | 4 |
| Bosnia and Herzegovina | 2 |

| Fifth place |
| 29 June – Calafell |
| Algeria | 0 |
| France | 1 |

=== Seventh place match ===
29 June 2018
18:00

| Turkey | 4–2 | Bosnia and Herzegovina |
|---|---|---|
| Šehić 45' (o.g.); Kabak 82'; Akgün 84'; Aydin 90+2' | Report | Imamović 12', 45' |

Estadi Municipal de La Pobla de Mafumet, La Pobla de Mafumet
Referee: Jérôme Brisard (France)

=== Fifth place match ===
29 June 2018
18:00

| Algeria | 0–1 | France |
|---|---|---|
| | Report | Badu 90+1' |

Estadi Municipal de Calafell, Calafell
Referee: Ioannis Papadopoulos (Greece)

== Knockout stage ==
Semifinals
28 June – Reus
Italy | 3
Greece | 0
28 June – La Pobla de Mafumet
Spain | 2
Morocco | 1

Final
30 June – Reus
Italy | 2
Spain | 3
Third place
30 June – La Pobla de Mafumet
Greece | 0 (6)
Morocco (p) | 0 (7)

=== Semifinals ===
28 June 2018
17:00

| Italy | 3–0 | Greece |
|---|---|---|
| Rauti 17'; Merola 31' (pen.); Caviglia 71' | Report |

Estadi Municipal de Reus, Reus
Referee: Hicham Tiazi (Morocco)

28 June 2018
20:00

| Spain | 2–1 | Morocco |
|---|---|---|
| Sancet 78'; Ruiz 82' (pen.) | Report | Tahif 13' |

Estadi Municipal de La Pobla de Mafumet, La Pobla de Mafumet
Referee: Srđan Jovanović (Serbia)

=== Bronze medal match ===
30 June 2018
10:00

| Greece | 0–0 (a.e.t.) | Morocco |
|---|---|---|
| | Report |
Penalties
| | 6–7 |

Estadi Municipal de La Pobla de Mafumet, La Pobla de Mafumet
Referee: Xavier Estrada Fernández (Spain)

=== Gold medal match ===
30 June 2018
12:30

| Italy | 2–3 | Spain |
|---|---|---|
| Rauti 6'; Portanova 88' | Report | Ruiz 26', 57', 90+4' |

Estadi Municipal de Reus, Reus
Referee: Halil Umut Meler (Turkey)

== Final standings ==
| Pos | Team | Pld | W | D | L | GF | GA | GD | Pts | Final result |
|---|---|---|---|---|---|---|---|---|---|---|
| 1st place, gold medalist(s) | Spain (H) | 4 | 4 | 0 | 0 | 11 | 5 | +6 | 12 | Gold medal |
| 2nd place, silver medalist(s) | Italy | 4 | 2 | 1 | 1 | 13 | 5 | +8 | 7 | Silver medal |
| 3rd place, bronze medalist(s) | Morocco | 4 | 1 | 2 | 1 | 5 | 5 | 0 | 5 | Bronze medal |
| 4 | Greece | 4 | 2 | 1 | 1 | 4 | 4 | 0 | 7 | Fourth place |
| 5 | France | 3 | 2 | 0 | 1 | 3 | 3 | 0 | 6 | 5th place match |
| 6 | Algeria | 3 | 1 | 0 | 2 | 3 | 5 | −2 | 3 | 5th place match |
| 7 | Turkey | 3 | 1 | 0 | 2 | 4 | 4 | 0 | 3 | 7th place match |
| 8 | Bosnia and Herzegovina | 3 | 0 | 0 | 3 | 3 | 8 | −5 | 0 | 7th place match |
| 9 | Libya | 2 | 0 | 0 | 2 | 1 | 8 | −7 | 0 | Group stage |

Source: Tarragona 2018
(H) Hosts

== Goalscorers ==
7 goals

- (Spain) Abel Ruiz

5 goals

- (Italy) Davide Merola

4 goals

- (Italy) Nicola Rauti

2 goals

- (Algeria) Idir Boutrif
- (Bosnia and Herzegovina) Armin Imamović
- (Greece) Dimitrios Emmanouilidis
- (Spain) Sergio Gómez Martín

1 goal

- (Algeria) Adem Zorgane
- (Bosnia and Herzegovina) Ajdin Hasić
- (France) Bastian Badu
- (France) Mamadou Gassama
- (France) Yaya Soumaré
- (Greece) Alexandros Gkargkalatzidis
- (Greece) Alexandros Voilis
- (Italy) Lorenzo Gavioli
- (Italy) Hans Nicolussi Caviglia
- (Italy) Manolo Portanova
- (Italy) Emanuel Vignato
- (Libya) Jihad Shaldun
- (Morocco) Soulaiman Drouich
- (Morocco) Aymane Mourid
- (Morocco) Azzedine Ounahi
- (Morocco) Achraf Rharib
- (Morocco) Adil Tahif
- (Spain) Nacho Díaz
- (Spain) Oihan Sancet
- (Turkey) Sefa Akgün
- (Turkey) Behlül Aydin
- (Turkey) Ozan Kabak

Own goal

- (Bosnia and Herzegovina) Eldar Šehić (against Turkey)
