= Tunisian Football Federation =

Governing body of association football in Tunisia

CAF
- Short name: FTF
- Founded: 29 March 1957; 69 years ago
- Headquarters: El Menzah, Tunis, Tunisia
- FIFA affiliation: 1960; 66 years ago
- CAF affiliation: 1960; 66 years ago
- UAFA affiliation: 1976; 50 years ago
- UNAF affiliation: 2005; 21 years ago
- President: Moez Nasri
- Vice-President: Hussein Jenayah
- Website: ftf.org.tn

The Tunisian Football Federation (Arabic: الجامعة التونسية لكرة القدم), or simply FTF, is the governing body of football in Tunisia, it established on 29 March 1957, its headquarters is located in El Menzah, Tunisia. It became a member in the FIFA and CAF in 1960, the UAFA in 1976 and the UNAF in 2005. The federation’s mission aims to develop football in the country, administers the national football league system, also responsible for the national football teams across all age categories and disciplines.

The current president is Moez Nasri since 25 January 2025.

== History ==
It was during a meeting held on 9 November 1909 by a provisional committee bringing together sports societies that the first statutes of an official championship were adopted.

In 1921, the Tunisian Football Association League (LTFA) was founded, it became a member of the Union of North African Football Leagues in 1922 and organize the Tunisian Championship and Tunisian Cup to compensate the Union of French Athletic Sports Societies (USFSA). Beginning with the 1921–22 season, the Tunisian championship was organized on a regular basis under the name of The Honor Division Championship, while the Tunisian Cup competition commenced a year later.

Immediately following the proclamation of independence in 1956, Tunisian football leaders took the necessary steps to establish the Tunisian Football Federation (FTF), which was officially approved on 29 March 1957. Recognized as being of public utility, the Tunisian Football Federation has since invested in its dual mission of promoting football and managing the national competition as well as the various teams representing Tunisia in international competitions.

== Presidents ==
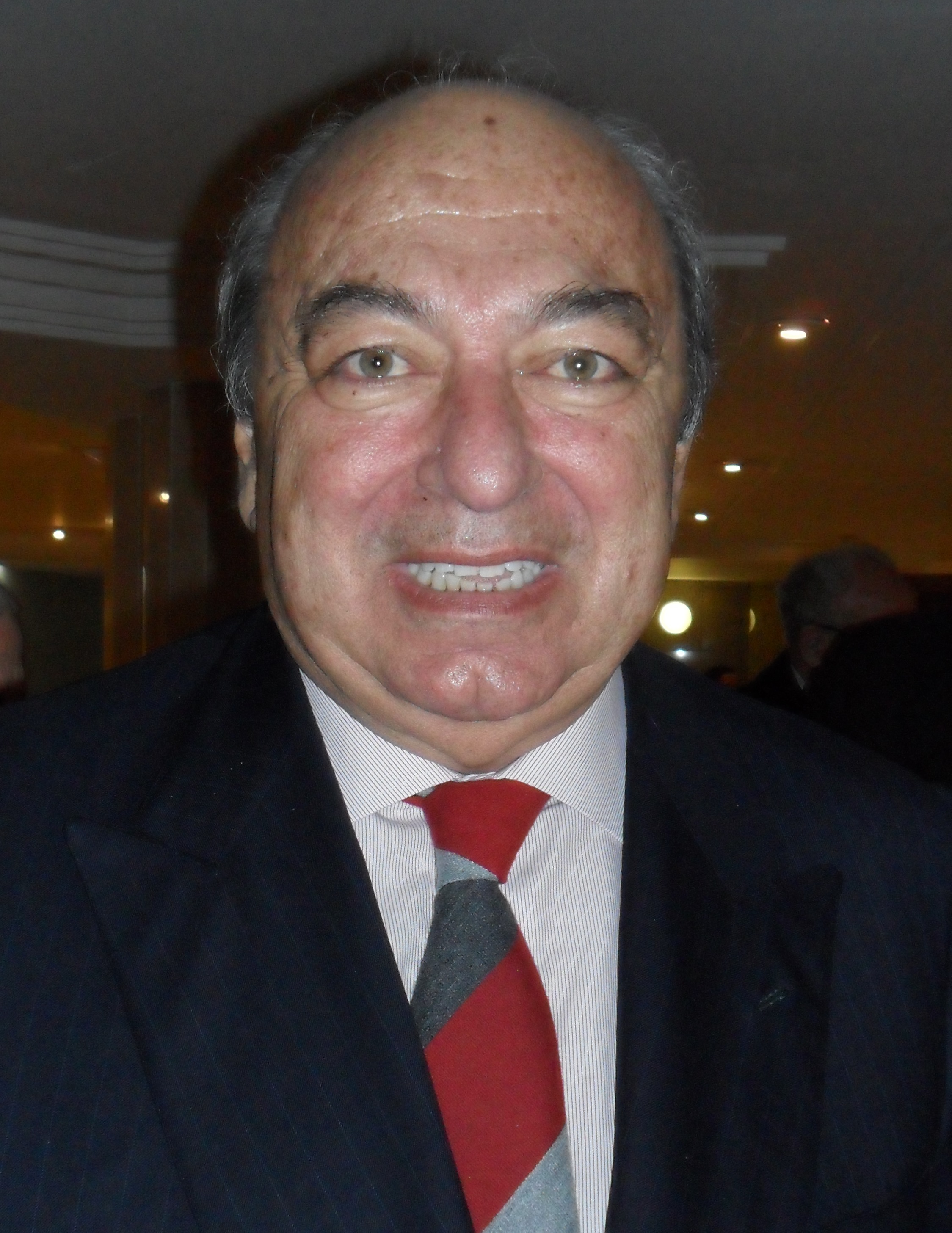
Hammouda Ben Ammar, president of the federation between 2002 and 2006. Under his presidency the men's national team won the 2004 African Cup of Nations .

- 1957−1962: Chedly Zouiten
- 1962−1964: Mohammed Mzali
- 1964−1965: Fouad Mebazaa
- 1965−1968: Sadok Es-Soussi
- 1968−1969: Beji Mestiri
- 1969−1971: Ahmed Zouiten
- 1971−1971: Fathi Zouhir
- 1971−1972: Hedi Annabi
- 1972−1975: Beji Mestiri
- 1975−1976: Abdelhamid Escheikh
- 1976−1980: Slim Aloulou
- 1980−1982: Ahmed Sahnoun
- 1982−1983: Moncef Foudhaili
- 1983−1986: Saleh Ben Jannet
- 1986−1989: Slim Aloulou
- 1989−1990: Abdelwaheb Jemal
- 1990−1993: Moncef Chérif
- 1993−1994: Moncef Foudhaili
- 1994−1996: Mohamed Raouf Najar
- 1996−1997: Younès Chetali
- 1997−2000: Tarek Ben Mbarek
- 2000−2001: Khaled Sanchou
- 2001−2002: Aboulhassen Fekih
- 2002−2006: Hammouda Ben Ammar
- 2006−2007: Ali Labiadh
- 2007−2008: Tahar Sioud
- 2008−2010: Kamel Ben Amor
- 2010−2011: Ali Hafsi Jeddi
- 2011−2012: Anouar Haddad
- 2012−2023: Wadie Jary
- 2023−2024: Wassef Jelaiel (interim)
- 2024−2025: Kamel Idir (N.C.)
- Since 2025: Moez Nasri

== Federal office ==
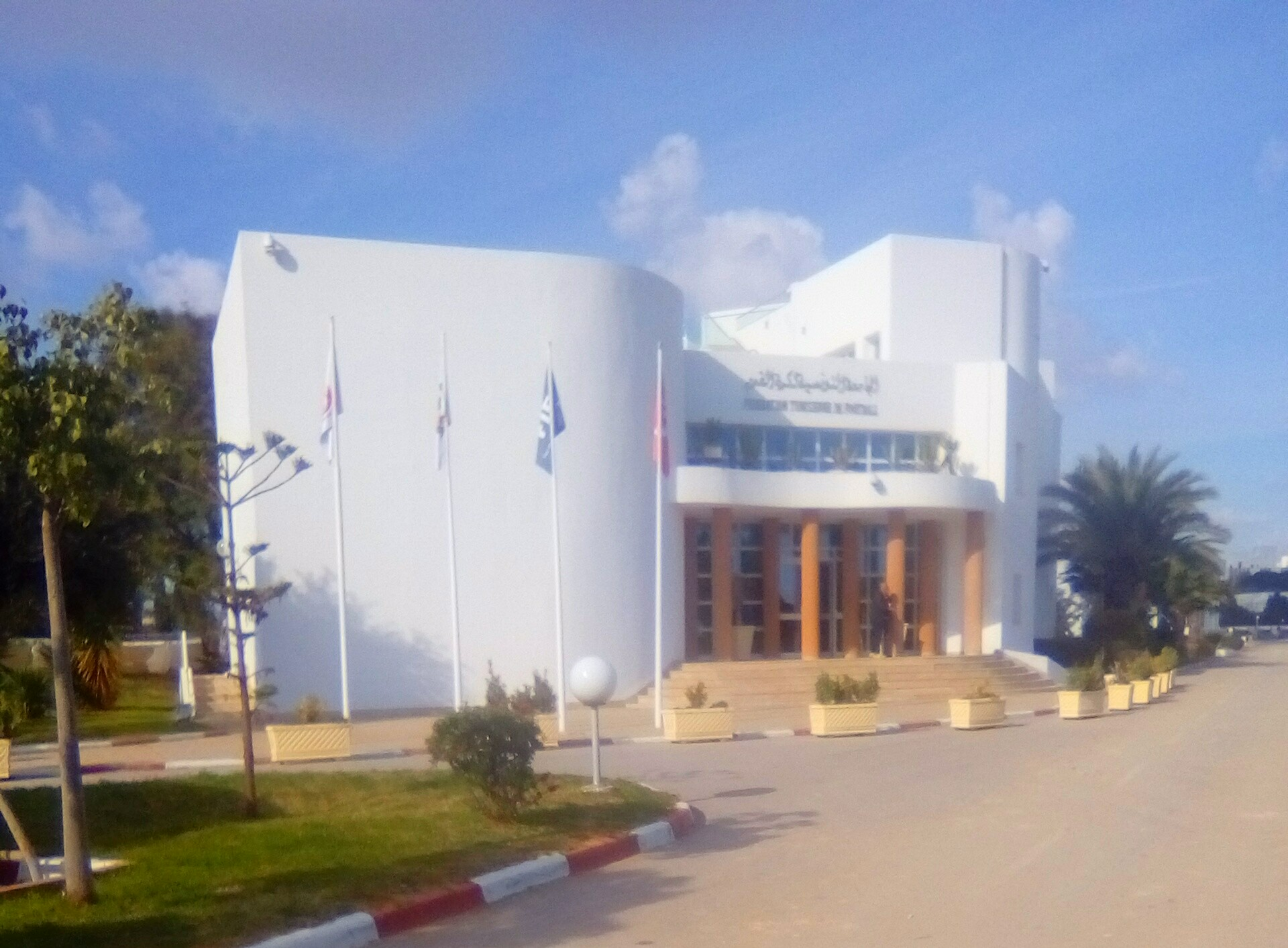
Tunisian Football Federation headquarters in El Menzah, Tunis.

The members of the federal office are as follows:

- Moez Nasri (President)
- Hussein Jenayah (Vice-president)
- Rim Bjeoui
- Marwa Sekhiri
- Moez Mestiri
- Naji Chahed
- Wissam Ltaief
- Belhassen Bessamra
- Munoubi Taroudi
- Moez Naili
- Khemaies Hamzawi
- Ziad Massoudi

== National leagues and directions ==
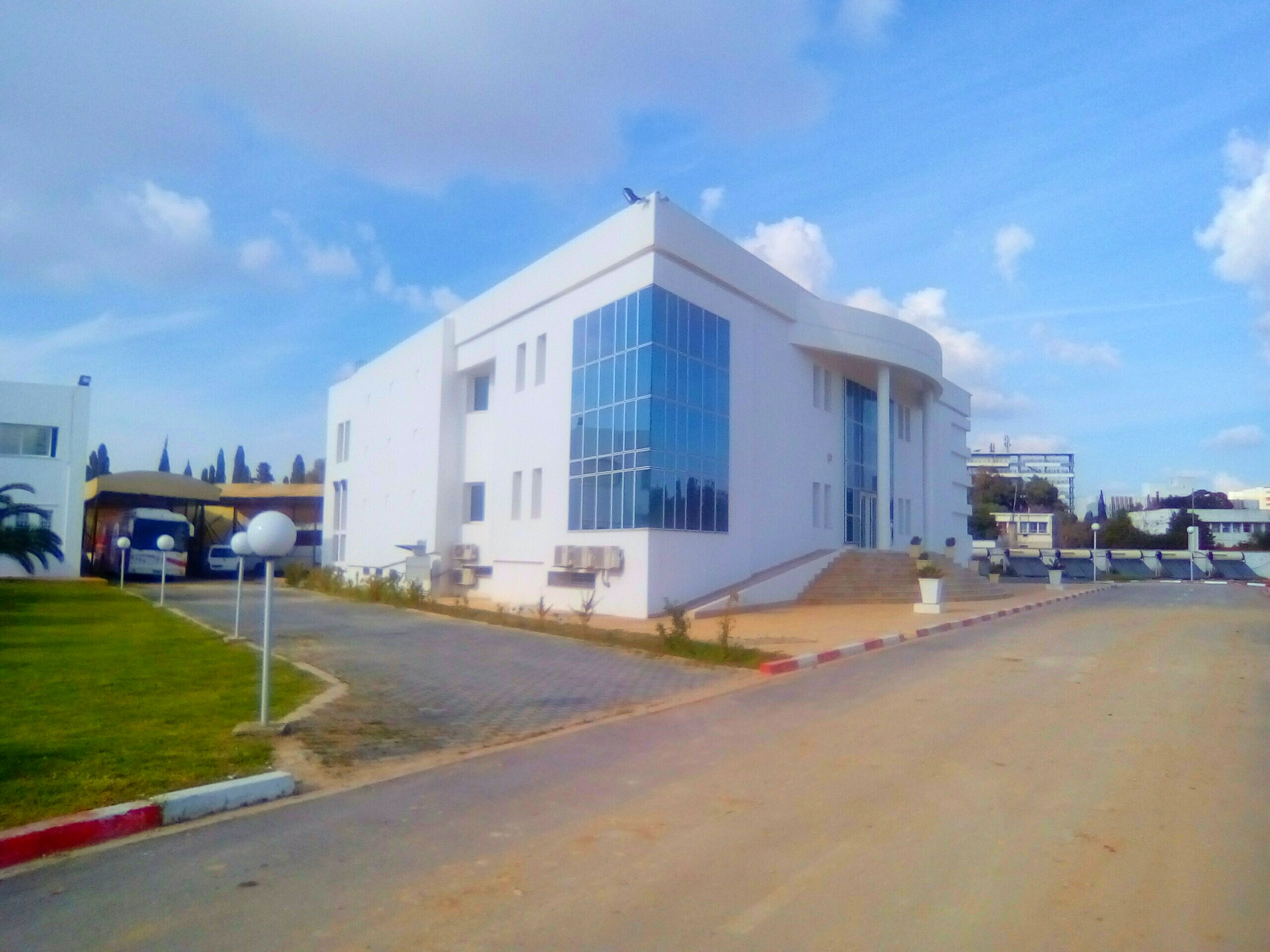
National Arbitration Directorate headquarters in El Menzah, Tunis.

- National Professional Football League (LNFP)
  - President: Walid Ben Mohamed
- National Amateur Football League (LNFA)
  - 1st level president: Dhafer Lassoued
  - 2nd level president: Mohamed Ali Khalifa
- National Women's Football League (LNFF)
  - President: Khaled Lacheb
- National Futsal and Beach Soccer League (LNFB)
  - President: vacant
- National Arbitration Directorate (DNA)
  - General Supervisor: Neji Jouini
- National Technical Directorate (DTN)
  - Director: Ridha Jeddi

== Competitions ==
=== Current title holders ===
Competition	Year	Champions	Runners-up	Next edition
Senior (Men's)
Tunisian Ligue Professionnelle 1	2025–26	Club Africain	Espérance de Tunis	2026–27
Tunisian Cup	2025–26	Espérance de Tunis	ES Zarzis	2026–27
Tunisian Super Cup	2024–25	Espérance de Tunis	Stade Tunisien	2025–26
Senior (Women's)
Tunisian Women's Championship	2025–26	ASF Sousse		2026–27
Tunisian Women's Cup	2022–23	ASF Sousse	US Tunisienne	TBD

=== Defunct ===
- Tunisian Coupe de la Ligue Professionnelle (1999–2007)

== Qualification for CAF competitions ==
=== Association ranking for the 2025–26 CAF club season ===
The association ranking for the 2025–26 CAF Champions League and the 2025–26 CAF Confederation Cup will be based on results from each CAF club competition from 2020–21 to the 2024–25 season.

Legend

- CL: CAF Champions League
- CC: CAF Confederation Cup
- ≥: Associations points might increase on basis of its clubs performance in 2024–25 CAF club competitions
- Associations ranked 1–12 are eligible to enter two teams in each CAF club competition.

Rank			Association	2020–21 (× 1)		2021–22 (× 2)		2022–23 (× 3)		2023–24 (× 4)		2024–25 (× 5)		Total
2025	2024	Mvt	Association	CL	CC	CL	CC	CL	CC	CL	CC	CL	CC	Total
1	1	—	Egypt	8	3	7	4	8	2.5	7	7	10	4	190.5
2	2	—	Morocco	4	6	9	5	8	2	2	4	5	5	142
3	4	+1	South Africa	8	2	5	4	4	3	4	1.5	9	3	131
4	3	-1	Algeria	6	5	7	1	6	5	2	3	5	5	130
5	6	+1	Tanzania	3	0.5	0	2	3	4	6	0	2	4	82.5
6	5	-1	Tunisia	4	3	5	1	4	2	6	1	3	0.5	82.5
7	8	+1	Angola	1	0	5	0	2	0	3	1.5	2	2	55
8	7	-1	DR Congo	4	0	0	3	1	2	4	0	2	0	45
9	9	—	Sudan	3	0	3	0	3	0	2	0	3	0	41
10	11	+1	Ivory Coast	0	0	0	1	0	3	3	0	1	2	38
11	10	-1	Libya	0	0.5	0	5	0	0.5	0	3	0	0	24
12	12	—	Nigeria	0	2	0	0	0	2	0	2	0	1	21

== Controversies ==
=== Conflict between Ministry of Sports and FTF (2013−2014) ===
A dispute arises between the Minister of Youth and Sports, Tarak Dhiab, and the President of the Tunisian Football Federation, Wadie Jary, on the basis of the choice of the national coach. Indeed, with the support of FIFA, which prohibits any political interference in the affairs of the federations, Jary does not consult the minister and hires Mokhtar Tlili as a special advisor and Nabil Maâloul as coach. However, both are members of a political party, Nidaa Tounes, the main opponent of the Ennahda in power, and long-time opponents of Dhiab and his ally Khaled Ben Yahia, whom he proposed to appoint as head of the national team.

The minister concludes that Jary is declaring war on him, forgetting that the absolute independence of the federations advocated by FIFA does not apply here because the federation is financially dependent on the government. Tlili's appointment to an ambiguous position, alongside an armada of coaches and technicians, is considered a sign of mismanagement on the part of the federation, which considers that it is not accountable to the ministry, which must simply finance its budget. The conflict is making headlines and both sides are hurling insults at each other. Taking advantage of the national team's provisional elimination from the 2014 FIFA World Cup qualification, after a defeat against Cape Verde, the ministry wrote to FIFA to complain about the federation's abuses and ask for its opinion.

After Jary's complaint to Rached Ghannouchi, president of Ennahda, Hédi Benzarti, member of the Nidaa Tounes steering committee and president of the club presidents' association, presented demands for subsidies and imposed the postponement of the resumption of competitions until these demands were met in order to put the minister in a difficult position. Some even spy on the minister's meeting with the third division clubs; Karim Hani, president of the US Sbeïtla, admits to having given Jary a recording of this meeting. However, Maâloul's resignation, the miraculous qualification of the national team, Jary's response to FIFA in which he denies the interference of the ministry and the intervention of the head of government temporarily calm the situation.

=== Conflict with CS Chebba and FTF (2020–2021) ===
On 17 October 2020, the Tunisian Football Federation freezes the activities of CS Chebba, a decision which follows a dispute between the two parties, the club having been ordered to pay a fine of 200,000 dinars. Faced with the non-payment of this amount, the decision is taken by the Federation to exclude the club from all national championships from the 2020–21 season and to organize a play-off round to identify the team which will replace it. At the end of this tournament, it is JS Kairouan which remains among the elite despite a perfect tie with the CS Hammam-Lif. Indeed, it is the criterion of the best fair play ranking which decided between the two teams. On 11 September 2021, the club returned to the championship following a vote by the ordinary general assembly of the Federation.

=== Threatening to be excluded of 2022 FIFA World Cup ===
At the end of October 2022, an internal dispute concerning the Minister of Youth and Sports, Kamel Deguiche, and the president of the Tunisian Football Federation, Wadie Jary, threatens Tunisia's participation in the World Cup. Indeed, the two men are known to hate each other and the first wishes to dissolve the federation to separate from the second. FIFA systematically penalizes cases of interference in the world of football, it therefore warns the Tunisian federation: by means of a letter, it warns that it reserves the right to exclude Tunisia from the competition in case of taking power over the federation by Deguiche.

=== Allegations of interference in the 2022 FIFA World Cup men's team squad ===
Dozens of news websites in Tunisia reported that coach Jalel Kadri was subjected to pressure during the formation of the Tunisian team's squad for the 2022 World Cup, according to the player Saad Bguir, who was excluded from the final list and who was on the initial list. He also announced his international retirement through a phone call on the TV program Stade Plus on Carthage Plus, until the president of the Tunisian Football Federation, Wadie Jary, left his position. It started when Bilel Ifa was excluded from the list a day before the official announcement, and was later brought back after fans outraged on social media. On 14 November 2022, hundreds of fans greeted the team bus in Doha upon their arrival, but the president of the Federation was insulted in the worst terms.

Also, the selection of four goalkeepers was under pressure from the Tunisian Football Federation to meet the wishes of certain teams on the financial level, FIFA, since the 2010 FIFA World Cup, paying a subsidy to each. team, of which at least one player has been called up in each edition of the competition. On 28 November 2022, former national team player Issam Jemâa said on Radio IFM, that FTF officials had sacrificed one of the players to call four goalkeepers into the final list, as the choice was on Bilel Ifa, who returned to the team after the anger of the fans, Taha Yassine Khenissi, who was medically examined for two hours, so they could find him injured or Seifeddine Jaziri, who was called up due to financial transactions between him and the brother of the president of the FTF, Wajih Jary. In the final, Saad Bguir was abandoned.

=== The legal status of former President Wadie Jary (2022–2026) ===
On 14 November 2022, an investigating judge issued an urgent summons for the arrest of Wadie Jary, president of the Tunisian Football Federation, after he failed to appear for three scheduled interrogations; he is now officially a wanted person. Furthermore, he has been referred to court in connection with corruption cases—a fact confirmed by lawyer Wafa Chedly, Minister of Justice Leïla Jaffel, and Minister of Youth and Sports Kamel Deguiche.

In February 2023, Wadie Jary, then-president of the Tunisian Football Federation, does not have the right to leave Tunisian territory following a court decision because he is the target of several investigations relating to the organization of match-fixing, cases of money laundering, embezzlement funds and corruption. On 25 October 2023, he was arrested and detained in Mornaguia prison. As vice president, Wassef Jelaiel temporarily assumed the presidency.

On 24 April 2024, the investigating judge at the Court of First Instance of Tunis notified him of the extension of his pretrial detention for an additional four-month period. On 20 February 2025, the criminal chamber of the Court of First Instance of Tunis sentenced him to four years in prison and a ban on holding public office. He was ultimately granted a pardon on 25 July 2026, on the occasion of Republic Day by the President of the Republic, Kais Saied.

=== Electoral crisis and FIFA Normalization Committee (2024–2025) ===
On 30 January 2024, an electoral session is scheduled to elect a new federal office on 9 March. Three lists are presented: that of Maher Ben Aïssa, former president of AS Marsa, Jalel Ben Tekaya, president of the Tunisian Federation of Sport for All and Wissem Letaief, president of the Regional Football League of Sousse. Nominations close on 17 February and all files are transmitted to the Independent Electoral Commission for examination in accordance with established provisions and procedures.

However, on 23 February, all lists were rejected and the election date was postponed. On 2 April, a new election is set for 11 May, and candidacies are open again. On 20 April, the applications closed with three lists again: that of Ziad Tlemçani, businessman former and international player, Wassef Jelaiel, vice-president of the FTF and Jalel Ben Tekaya, candidate for the second time. Four days later, Jelaiel's list was rejected and the lists of Tlemçani and Ben Tekaya were accepted. Jelaiel files an appeal against the competing lists, which requires a re-examination of their validity. On 30 April, all the candidates were finally rejected and the election date was postponed again. On 27 May 2024, a FIFA delegation met with the Minister of Youth and Sports, Kamel Deguiche, where the status of the federation was discussed and the mandate of the federal office extended until 30 June until the formation of a governing body. On 31 May, FIFA extended the mandate of the Federal Office until 15 July.

After the end of the mandate, FIFA decided on 23 July to create a Normalization Committee for the Tunisian Football Federation. The move comes after consultations with the Confederation of African Football to provide a way to get the FTF out of the current crisis and into a new perspective. its status and electoral regulations in accordance with its new regulatory framework. The period during which the Normalization Committee carries out its work with regard to the FTF expires immediately after the completion of its missions, and at the latest on 31 January 2025. On 19 August 2024, the businessman, politician and sport manager, Kamel Idir was appointed chairman of the Normalization Committee created by FIFA, in collaboration with Dr. Zakia Bartaji and Professor Chedly Rahmani as members.

On 25 November, Idir confirmed that the ordinary and extraordinary general assembly will take place on 21 December to modify certain articles of its statute and 25 January 2025 the date of the elective general assembly to design the new Federal office. On 21 December, the Extraordinary General Assembly was held where the financial and literary reports were presented and the new electoral laws were voted on. The session also revealed a financial deficit of 8 million dinars and outstanding debts owed by the clubs of 15 million dinars. On 25 December the Normalization Committee announced the opening of nominations for the 25 January elections. On 5 January 2025 three candidates filed their lists: Mahmoud Hammami, Moez Nasri and Jalel Ben Tekaya. On 25 January, Moez Nasri was elected as a new president.

== Honours ==
=== Men's team ===
- Africa Cup of Nations

(gold) Champions (1): 2004
(silver) Runner-up (2): 1965, 1996
(bronze) Third Place (1): 1962

- African Nations Championship

(gold) Champions (1): 2011

- FIFA Arab Cup

(gold) Champions (1): 1963
(silver) Runners-up (1): 2021

- Arab Games

(silver) Runner-up (1): 1957

- Mediterranean Games

(silver) Runners up (1): 1971
(bronze) Third Place (1): 1975

- Palestine Cup of Nations

(gold) Champions (1): 1973

=== Men's U23 team ===
- African Games

(silver) Runners up (1): 1991
(bronze) Third Place (1): 2007

- UNAF U-23 Tournament

(silver) Runners up (1): 2007

- Maurice Revello Tournament

(silver) Runners up (1): 2026

=== Men's U20 team ===
- U-20 Africa Cup of Nations

(silver) Runners-up (1): 1985

- Arab Cup U-20

(gold) Champions (1): 2012
(silver) Runners-up (1): 2020

- UNAF U-20 Tournament

(gold) Champions (9): 2005, 2007, 2009, Mar 2012, 2019, 2020, 2021, 2022, 2023
(silver) Runners-up (3): 2008, 2010, 2015
(bronze) Third Place (2): 2006, 2024

- Mediterranean Games

(gold) Champions (1): 2001
(silver) Runners-up (1): 2026
(bronze) Third Place (1): 2013

=== Men's U18 team ===
- UNAF U-18 Tournament

(gold) Champions (1): 2017

=== Men's U17 team ===
- U-17 Africa Cup of Nations

(bronze) Third Place (1): 2013

- Arab Cup U-17

(gold) Champions (1): 2012

- UNAF U-17 Tournament

(gold) Champions (3): Mar 2008, Dec 2012, 2017
(silver) Runners-up (5): 2006, 2007, 2010, 2016, 2021
(bronze) Third Place (6): Mar 2012, 2014, Aug 2018, Dec 2018, Mar 2022, Nov 2024

- UNAF U-16 Tournament

(gold) Champions (2): 2009, 2026
(silver) Runners-up: 2015

=== Men's U15 team ===
- UNAF U-15 Tournament

(gold) Champions (1): 2017
(bronze) Third Place (2): Apr 2018, Nov 2018

=== Men's futsal team ===
- North African Futsal Tournament

(bronze) Third Place (3): 2005, 2009, 2010

=== Women's team ===
- Arab Women's Cup

(silver) Runners-up (1): 2021
(bronze) Third Place (1): 2006

- UNAF Women's Tournament

(gold) Champions (1): 2009
(bronze) Third Place (1): 2020

- Menton Tournament

(gold) Champions (3): 2010, 2013, 2014
(silver) Runners-up (1): 2009

- FIFA Unites Women's Series

(silver) Runners-up (1): 2025

=== Women's U20 team ===
UNAF U-20 Women's Tournament

- (bronze) Third place (1): 2025

=== Women's U17 team ===
- UNAF U-17 Women's Tournament

(silver) Runners-up (2): 2024, 2026

== Sponsors ==
- Kappa
- Carrefour
- MG Motor
- CARTE Assurances
- Sicam
- Banque Nationale Agricole
- Sabrine
- La Cigale Tabarka
- OLA Energy
- Mazzaro Milano

== See also ==
- Tunisia national football team
- Tunisia A' national football team
- Tunisia national under-23 football team
- Tunisia national under-20 football team
- Tunisia national under-18 football team
- Tunisia national under-17 football team
- Tunisia national under-15 football team
- Tunisia women's national football team
- Tunisia women's national under-20 football team
- Tunisia women's national under-17 football team
- Tunisia national futsal team
- Tunisia national beach soccer team
