= Ayman Ouhatti =

Moroccan footballer

Personal information
- Full name: Mohamed Ayman Ouhatti
- Date of birth: 15 January 2000 (age 26)
- Place of birth: Rabat, Morocco
- Height: 1.85 m (6 ft 1 in)
- Position: Midfielder

Team information
- Current team: Al-Markhiya
- Number: 55

Youth career
- Mohammed VI

Senior career*
Years	Team	Apps	(Gls)
2019–2022	Amiens II	8	(1)
2021–2022	Amiens	2	(0)
2021–2022	→ Orléans II (loan)	2	(0)
2022–2023	UT Pétange	21	(0)
2023–2024	Amiens	16	(0)
2024–	Al-Markhiya	1	(0)

International career^{‡}
2021	Morocco U20	3	(0)
Medal record
Representing Morocco
UNAF U-20 Tournament
Winner	2020 Tunisia
UNAF U-18 Tournament
Winner	2019 Egypt
- * Club domestic league appearances and goals as of 11 June 2024 ‡ National team caps and goals as of 21:03, 21 April 2021 (UTC)

Mohamed Ayman Ouhatti (born 15 January 2000) is a Moroccan professional footballer who plays as a midfielder for Al-Markhiya.

== Professional career ==
Ouhatti joined the youth academy of Amiens in 2019 from the Mohammed VI Football Academy. He made his professional debut with Amiens in a 3–1 Ligue 2 win over Valenciennes FC on 20 April 2021.

On 13 July 2021, he joined Orléans on loan.

== International career ==
Ouhati was on the final list to participate in the 2020 UNAF U-20 Tournament qualifying for the 2021 Africa U-20 Cup of Nations and participated in all matches. Ouhatti represented the Morocco U20s at the 2021 Africa U-20 Cup of Nations.

== Honours ==
Morocco U18

- UNAF U-18 Tournament: 2019

Morocco U20

- UNAF U-20 Tournament: 2020
