= Football at the 2018 African Youth Games =

2018 African Youth Games men's football tournament
Tournament details
- Host country: Algeria
- City: Algiers
- Dates: 19–27 July 2018
- Teams: (from 1 confederation)

Final positions
- Champions: Morocco (1st title)
- Runners-up: Nigeria
- Third place: Cameroon
- Fourth place: Algeria

The 2018 African Youth Games football tournament was the third edition of the African Youth Games men's football tournament. The men's football tournament was held in Algiers, Algeria between 19 and 27 July 2018 as part of the 2018 African Youth Games. The tournament was age restricted and open to men's under-15 national teams only.

== Participating teams ==
Six teams participated to the final tournament. Libya and Democratic Republic of the Congo withdrew from the tournament.

- Algeria (hosts)
- Cameroon
- DR Congo (withdrew)
- Djibouti
- Guinea-Bissau
- Libya (withdrew)
- Morocco
- Nigeria

== Final tournament ==
=== Group stage ===
==== Group A ====
Team	Pld	W	D	L	GF	GA	GD	Pts
Nigeria	2	2	0	0	7	2	+5	6
Morocco	2	1	0	1	8	3	+5	3
Djibouti	2	0	0	2	0	11	−11	0
Libya (W)	0	0	0	0	0	0	0	0

(W) Withdrew
19 July 2018
18:00

Nigeria	3–2	Morocco
?; ?; ?		Mawhoub 9'; Radid 22'

Bab Ezzouar, Algiers

21 July 2018
18:00

Djibouti	0–5	Nigeria

Bab Ezzouar, Algiers

23 July 2018
18:00

Morocco	6–0	Djibouti

Bab Ezzouar, Algiers

==== Group B ====
Team	Pld	W	D	L	GF	GA	GD	Pts
Cameroon	2	1	1	0	3	1	+2	4
Algeria	2	1	1	0	3	2	+1	4
Guinea-Bissau	2	0	0	2	1	4	−3	0
DR Congo (W)	0	0	0	0	0	0	0	0

(W) Withdrew
19 July 2018
18:00

Algeria	2–1	Guinea-Bissau

Sidi Moussa, Algiers

21 July 2018
18:00

Guinea-Bissau	0–2	Cameroon

Sidi Moussa, Algiers

23 July 2018
18:00

Algeria	1–1	Cameroon

Sidi Moussa, Algiers

=== Knockout stage ===
Semi-finals
25 July – Algiers
Nigeria	2
Algeria	0
25 July – Algiers
Cameroon	1
Morocco	2

Gold medal match
27 July – Algiers
Nigeria	1
Morocco	3
Bronze medal match
27 July – Algiers
Algeria	0
Cameroon	1

==== Semi-finals ====
25 July 2018
17:30

Nigeria	2–0	Algeria

20 August Stadium, Algiers

25 July 2018
17:30

Cameroon	1–2	Morocco

Sidi Moussa, Algiers

==== Bronze medal match ====
27 July 2018
15:30

Algeria	0–1	Cameroon
		Tchebegna 56'

20 August Stadium, Algiers

==== Gold medal match ====
27 July 2018
18:00

Nigeria	1–3	Morocco
Adeleke 60'		Radid 20', 67'; Laghrib 46'

20 August Stadium, Algiers

== Final ranking ==
Pos	Team	Pld	W	D	L	GF	GA	GD	Pts	Final result
1st place, gold medalist(s)	Morocco	4	3	0	1	13	5	+8	9	Gold Medal
2nd place, silver medalist(s)	Nigeria	4	3	0	1	10	5	+5	9	Silver Medal
3rd place, bronze medalist(s)	Cameroon	4	2	1	1	5	3	+2	7	Bronze Medal
4	Algeria (H)	4	1	1	2	3	5	−2	4	Fourth place
5	Guinea-Bissau	2	0	0	2	1	4	−3	0	Eliminated in group stage
6	Djibouti	2	0	0	2	0	11	−11	0	Eliminated in group stage
7	DR Congo	0	0	0	0	0	0	0	0	Withdrew
8	Libya	0	0	0	0	0	0	0	0	Withdrew

(H) Hosts
