= Moez =

Moez (Arabic: معز) is a masculine given name of Arabic origin. Notable people with the name include:

== Given name ==
- Moez Bouakaz (born 1966), Tunisian football player
- Moez Chakchouk (born 1975), Tunisian engineer
- Moez Ben Cherifia (born 1991), Tunisian football player
- Moez Echargui (born 1993), Tunisian tennis player
- Moez Kassam (born 1980), Canadian businesspeople
- Moez Limayem (born 1960), Tunisian–American academic administrator, scientist and scholar
- Moez Masoud (born 1978), Egyptian scholar
- Moez Nasri (born 1972), Tunisian official, lawyer, and sports executive
- Moez Surani (born 1979), Canadian poet and artist
- Moez Zemzemi (1975–2012), Tunisian boxer
