= Wadie =

Wadie is a masculine given name of Arabic, Old English/British, Scottish, Irish and New Zealand origin. Notable people with the name include:

== Given name ==
- Wadie P. Deddeh (1920–2019), American politician from California
- Wadie Haddad (1927–1978), Palestinian leader of the Popular Front for the Liberation of Palestine's armed wing
- Wadie Jary (born 1972), Tunisian footballer
- Wadie Jwaideh (1916–2001), Iraqi-American professor of history and author

== Patronymic ==
- Nouhad Wadie Haddad (born 1934/35), the real name of Fairuz, Lebanese singer
- Edward Wadie Said (1935–2003), Palestinian-American academic, literary critic, and political activist
