= 2019 UNAF U-18 Tournament squads =

The 2019 UNAF U-18 Tournament is an international football tournament hosted by Egypt from 4 to 14 April 2019.

== Teams ==
Sources:.

=== Algeria ===
Coach: (France) Ludovic Batelli

No.	Pos.	Player	Date of birth (age)	Caps	Club
	GK	Redouane Maachou	4 February 2001 (aged 18)		(Algeria) USM Bel Abbès
	GK	El Hadi Sahnoun	5 January 2002 (aged 17)		(Algeria) Paradou AC
	GK	Abdelatif Ramdane	19 May 2001 (aged 17)		(Algeria) USM Alger
	DF	Reda Hamidi	8 June 2001 (aged 17)		(Algeria) Paradou AC
	DF	Abdelmalek Ould Belkacemi	23 August 2001 (aged 17)		(Algeria) RC Arbaâ
	DF	Chemseddine Bekkouche	13 March 2001 (aged 18)		(Algeria) ASM Oran
	DF	Chouaïb Boukaboul	3 April 2001 (aged 18)		(Algeria) Paradou AC
	DF	Aymen Boualeg	8 May 2001 (aged 17)		(Algeria) Paradou AC
	DF	Zakaria Boukebal	9 January 2002 (aged 17)		(Algeria) Paradou AC
	DF	Mohamed Amara	27 January 2001 (aged 18)		(Algeria) MC Oran
	DF	Ayoub Derbal	12 June 2001 (aged 17)		(Algeria) Paradou AC
	MF	Amide Zeghnoun	15 August 2001 (aged 17)		(Algeria) USM Bel Abbès
	MF	Aymen Bendaoud	18 June 2001 (aged 17)		(Algeria) CS Constantine
	MF	Abdelkarim Boukembouche	12 June 2001 (aged 17)		(Algeria) MC Alger
	MF	Khalil Bara	10 October 2001 (aged 17)		(Algeria) Paradou AC
	MF	Islam Belkheir	16 March 2001 (aged 18)		(Algeria) MC Oran
	FW	Adel Belkacem Bouzida	28 February 2002 (aged 17)		(Algeria) Paradou AC
	FW	Merouane Zerrouki	25 January 2001 (aged 18)		(Algeria) Paradou AC
	FW	Moncef Bakrar	13 January 2001 (aged 18)		(Algeria) ES Sétif
	FW	Lotfi Aouane	13 January 2001 (aged 18)		(Algeria) ASO Chlef
	FW	Aymen Sais	12 March 2001 (aged 18)		(Algeria) Paradou AC
	FW	Mohamed Boukerma	5 August 2001 (aged 17)		(Algeria) Paradou AC
