= 2019 UNAF U-15 Tournament =

بطولة إتحاد شمال إفريقيا لأقل من 15 سنة 2019

Tournament details
- Host country: Algeria
- Dates: 18 – 25 March
- Teams: 4 (from 1 confederation)
- Venue: 1 (in 1 host city)

Final positions
- Champions: Morocco (2nd title)
- Runners-up: Algeria
- Third place: Libya
- Fourth place: Mauritania

Tournament statistics
- Matches played: 6
- Goals scored: 21 (3.5 per match)

The 2019 UNAF U-15 Tournament is the 4th edition of the UNAF U-15 Tournament. The tournament took place in Oran, Algeria from 18 to 25 March 2019. Four teams take place to the tournament, Algeria, Libya, Morocco and the invited team Mauritania. Egypt and Tunisia withdrew from the tournament.

== Participants ==
- Algeria (hosts)
- Libya
- Morocco
- Mauritania (invited)

Withrawed teams

- Egypt (withdrew)
- Tunisia (withdrew)

== Venues ==
Oran	Oran is located in Algeria
Ahmed Zabana Stadium	Oran is located in Algeria
Capacity: 40,000	Oran is located in Algeria

== Match officials ==
Referees

- Abdelali Ibrir (Algeria)
- Mohamed Ahmed Abbas Qabeel (Egypt)
- Abdel Hamid Qchaira (Libya)
- Yassine Boussalim (Morocco)
- Houssam Boularas (Tunisia)

Assistant Referees

- Djamel Eddine Bourchou (Algeria)
- Abdelkader Slimani (Algeria)
- Shehab Sayed Saleh Rashed (Egypt)
- Essam Al-Tarhouni (Libya)
- Abdel Qadus Al-Maghrebi (Libya)
- Amine Dahane (Morocco)
- Idris Aït Jilal (Morocco)
- Mohamed Salim Jabaniani (Tunisia)

== Tournament ==
Team	Pld	W	D	L	GF	GA	GD	Pts
Morocco	3	2	1	0	11	2	+9	7
Algeria	3	2	0	1	7	2	+5	6
Libya	3	1	1	1	3	2	+1	4
Mauritania	3	0	0	3	0	15	−15	0

20 March 2019
14:30

Libya	1–1	Morocco
Faraj 46'	Report	Chourouk 4'

Ahmed Zabana Stadium, Oran
20 March 2019
16:45

Algeria	5–0	Mauritania
Laid 10'; Abdelaziz 35', 51'; Harfouche 60'; Benmechta 76'	Report

Ahmed Zabana Stadium, Oran

22 March 2019
14:30

Mauritania	0–2	Libya
	Report	Abdel Salam 42'; Bouchiba 67'

Ahmed Zabana Stadium, Oran
22 March 2019
16:45

Algeria	1–2	Morocco
Lalem 23' (pen.)	Report	Chamal 19'; Seddik 62'

Ahmed Zabana Stadium, Oran

24 March 2019
14:30

Morocco	8–0	Mauritania
Dali 36'; Akboub 38'; Chaouma 49'; Khalifi 54'; Seddik 55'; Chourouk 60' (pen.); El Sabbah 70'; Redouane 80'	Report

Ahmed Zabana Stadium, Oran
24 March 2019
16:45

Algeria	1–0	Libya
Omar 79'	Report

Ahmed Zabana Stadium, Oran

== Goalscorers ==
2 goals

- (Algeria) Malek Mohamed Abdelaziz
- (Morocco) Youcef Chourouk
- (Morocco) Omar Seddik

1 goal

- (Algeria) Mohamed Islam Benmechta
- (Algeria) Abdelghani Lalem
- (Algeria) Adem Harfouche
- (Algeria) Younes Laid
- (Algeria) Mohamed Rafik Omar
- (Libya) Ali Abdel Salam
- (Libya) Abdel Maysar Bouchiba
- (Libya) Yusef Faraj
- (Morocco) Hassan Akboub
- (Morocco) Saad Chamal
- (Morocco) Salem Chaouma
- (Morocco) Oussama Dali
- (Morocco) Amine El Sabbah
- (Morocco) Yacine Khalifi
- (Morocco) Taha Redouane
