= Aymane Mourid =

Moroccan footballer (born 2000)

Personal information
- Date of birth: 7 May 2000 (age 26)
- Place of birth: Casablanca, Morocco
- Height: 1.92 m (6 ft 4 in)
- Position: Midfielder

Team information
- Current team: Baltika Kaliningrad
- Number: 5

Youth career
- Mohammed VI Academy
- 2018–2019: → Leganés (loan)

Senior career*
Years	Team	Apps	(Gls)
2019–2020	Mohammed VI Academy	0	(0)
2019–2020	→ Leganés B (loan)	23	(2)
2019–2020	→ Leganés (loan)	0	(0)
2020–2022	Leganés B	30	(2)
2020–2021	→ Chabab Mohammédia (loan)	9	(0)
2022–2025	Union Touarga	72	(0)
2025–	Baltika Kaliningrad	22	(1)

International career^{‡}
2016–2017	Morocco U17		
2018–2019	Morocco U20		
2024	Morocco U23	1	(0)
- * Club domestic league appearances and goals as of 21 November 2026 ‡ National team caps and goals as of 17 November 2024

Aymane Mourid (Arabic: أيمن مريد; born 7 May 2000) is a Moroccan professional footballer who plays for Russian club Baltika Kaliningrad. Mainly a central midfielder, he can also play as a central defender.

== Club career ==
Mourid was born in Casablanca, and joined CD Leganés' youth setup in June 2018, from Mohammed VI Football Academy. Initially assigned to the Juvenil A squad, he made his senior debut with the reserves on 20 January 2019, starting in a 0–2 Tercera División away loss against CD Móstoles URJC.

Definitely promoted to the B-team for 2019–20, Mourid scored his first senior goal on 15 September 2019, netting the winner in a 2–1 away success over CA Pinto. He made his first team debut on 17 December, coming on as a late substitute for Javier Eraso in a 1–1 away draw against FC Andorra, for the season's Copa del Rey; he also converted his penalty kick in the 6–5 shoot-out win.

On 1 July 2020, Mourid signed for Lega permanently on a four-year contract. On 5 November, however, he was loaned to SCC Mohammédia for one year.

After making his debut for Chabab in the Moroccan Throne Cup, Mourid made his professional debut on 14 February 2021, starting in a 0–1 Botola Pro home loss against Mouloudia Oujda.

On 29 June 2025, Mourid signed a four-season contract with Baltika Kaliningrad in the Russian Premier League.

== Career statistics ==
As of 21 November 2026

Club	Season	League			Cup		Continental		Other		Total	
Club	Season	Division	Apps	Goals	Apps	Goals	Apps	Goals	Apps	Goals	Apps	Goals
Leganés B (loan)	2019–20	Tercera División	23	2	–		–		–		23	2
Leganés (loan)	2019–20	La Liga	0	0	2	0	–		–		2	0
Leganés	2020–21	Segunda División	0	0	0	0	–		–		0	0
Leganés	Team total		0	0	2	0	0	0	0	0	2	0
Leganés B	2020–21	Tercera División	3	0	–		–		–		3	0
Leganés B	2021–22	Segunda Federación	27	2	–		–		–		27	2
Leganés B	Team total		53	4	0	0	0	0	0	0	53	4
Chabab Mohammédia (loan)	2020–21	Botola Pro	9	0	3	0	–		–		12	0
Union Touarga	2022–23	Botola Pro	23	0	1	0	–		–		24	0
Union Touarga	2023–24	Botola Pro	24	0	2	0	–		–		26	0
Union Touarga	2024–25	Botola Pro	25	0	4	1	2 (Note: Appearances in CAF Confederation Cup)	0	1 (Note: Appearance in Moroccan Excellence Cup)	0	32	1
Union Touarga	Team total		72	0	7	1	2	0	1	0	82	1
Baltika Kaliningrad	2025–26	Russian Premier League	13	0	6	0	–		–		19	0
Baltika Kaliningrad	2026–27	Russian Premier League	9	1	1	0	–		–		10	1
Baltika Kaliningrad	Total		22	1	7	0	0	0	0	0	29	1
Career total			156	5	19	1	2	0	1	0	178	6
