= 2017 UNAF U-18 Tournament =

Tournament details
- Country: Tunisia
- Dates: 26 April – 2 May
- Teams: 4

Final positions
- Champions: Tunisia
- Runners-up: Morocco
- Third place: Algeria

Tournament statistics
- Matches played: 6
- Goals scored: 13 (2.17 per match)

The 2017 UNAF U-18 Tournament was the 1st edition of the UNAF U-18 Tournament. The tournament took place in Tunisia, from 26 April to 2 May 2017. Tunisia won the tournament.

== Participants ==
- Algeria
- Libya
- Morocco
- Tunisia (hosts)

== Tournament ==
Team	Pld	W	D	L	GF	GA	GD	Pts
Tunisia	3	2	0	1	3	1	+2	6
Morocco	3	1	1	1	3	3	0	4
Algeria	3	1	1	1	4	4	0	4
Libya	3	0	2	1	3	5	−2	2

=== Matches ===
April 27, 2017
14:30

Algeria	1 – 2	Morocco
Redouane Zerdoum 60'		Hatim El Ouhibi 31'; Ismail El Qrii 55'

Complexe Sportif, Sousse
Referee: Mohamed Amine Bennacer (Tunisia)
April 27, 2017
16:30

Tunisia	2 – 0	Libya
Moutaz Zemzmi 9', 21'

Complexe Sportif, Sousse
Referee: Hassan Rahmani (Morocco)

April 29, 2017
16:30

Morocco	1 – 1	Libya
Anas Benhmida 13'		Mouad Abdelbasset Salim 16'

Complexe Sportif, Sousse
Referee: Said Aouina (Algeria)
April 29, 2017
16:30

Tunisia	0 – 1	Algeria
		Mohamed Amine El Baghdaoui 47'

Stade Ali Zouaoui, Kairouan
Referee: Abdelouahid Ramadan Khalifa Hriouidah (Libya)

May 01, 2017
14:30

Algeria	2 – 2	Libya

Complexe Sportif, Sousse
Referee: Hassan Rahmani (Morocco)
May 01, 2017
16:30

Tunisia	1 – 0	Morocco
Mourtada Ben Saâda 79'

Complexe Sportif, Sousse
Referee: Said Aouina (Algeria)

== Winners ==
2017 UNAF U-18 Tournament winners

Tunisia
First title
