= Kamel Idir =

Tunisian handball player

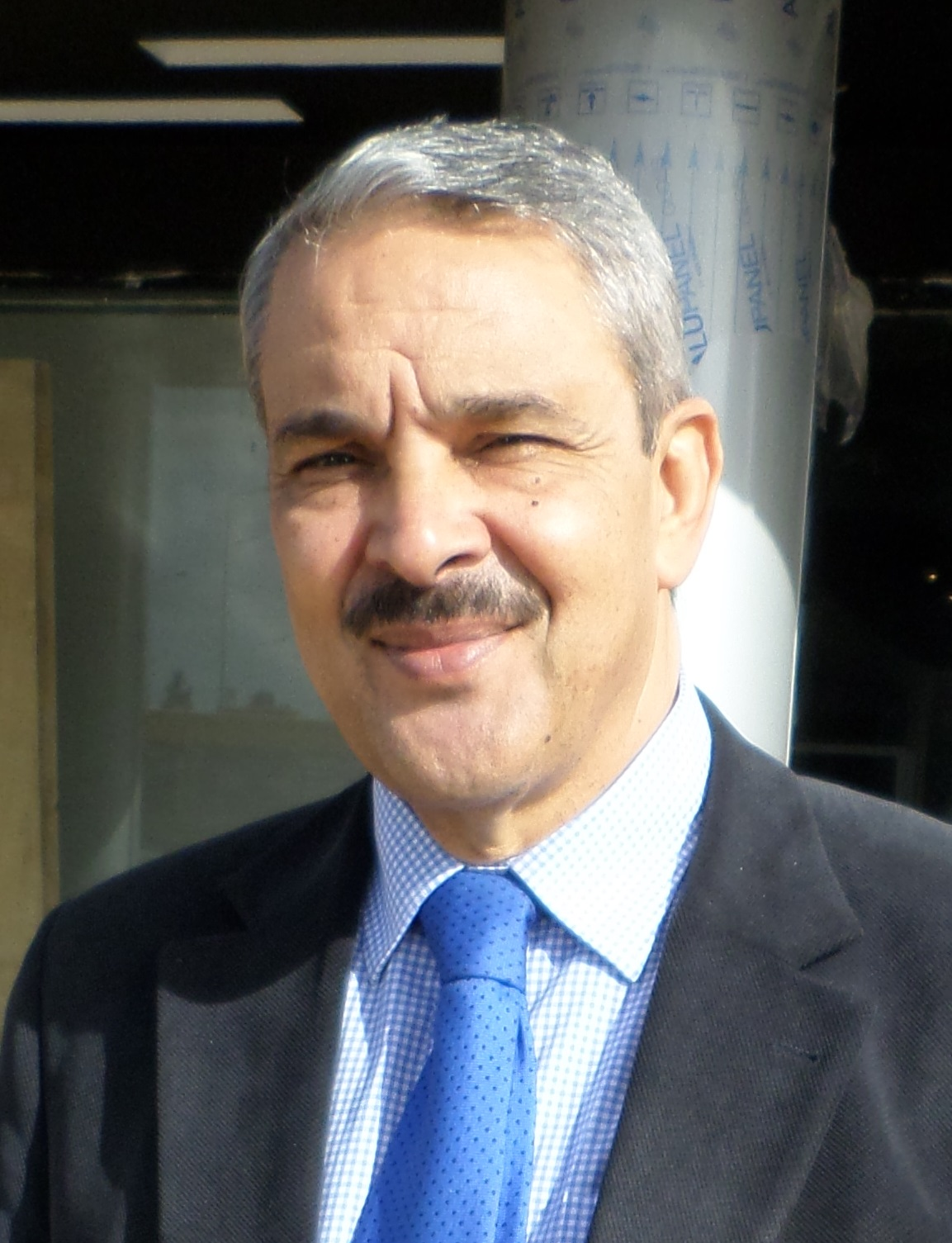
- Idir in 2012

President of Tunisian Football Federation FIFA Normalization Committee
- In office 19 August 2024 – 25 January 2025
- Preceded by: Wassef Jelaiel (acting)
- Succeeded by: Moez Nasri

Personal details
- Born: September 6, 1952 (age 74) Tunis, Tunisia
- Education: Faculty of Pharmacy of Monastir
- Occupation: Businessman; Pharmacist; Politician

Kamel Idir (Arabic: كمال إيدير), also spelled Kamel Iddir, born 6 September 1952 in Tunis, is a Tunisian businessman, pharmacist, politician and former handball player. A doctor of pharmacy, he teaches galenic pharmacy at the Faculty of Pharmacy of Monastir.

He is also the Inspector General of Health and Director General of Pharmacy and Medicine. He also chaired the Tunisian multi-sports club Club Africain from November 2005 to June 2010. On 19 August 2024, he was appointed as president of the Normalization Committee set up by FIFA to manage the affairs of the Tunisian Football Federation.

== Career ==
=== Sports career ===
Born in Tunis, Kamel Idir was a player and captain of the handball section of Club Africain. He was also an international playing for the Tunisian national team in the 1970s, winning the African Men's Handball Championship in 1974. Having joined the club's management, he spent seven years on the board of directors with Farid Abbes and Chérif Bellamine, including one year as head of the youth center and three as first vice-president.

When Bellamine resigned, following the successive failures of the football section, expressed by the absence of a title (the last National Championship won in 1996 and the last Tunisian Cup won in 2000), he served as interim president from 26 November 2005 to 23 June 2010, the date of the elective general meeting. Subsequently, he was re-elected for two two-year terms, the last of which ended in 2010. Under his presidency, the football team managed to win the 2007–08 Tunisian Ligue Professionnelle 1, twelve years after the last victory in 1996, and the North African Cup of Champions in 2008. In addition, he chaired the organizing committee of the 2005 World Men's Handball Championship held in Tunisia.

==== FIFA Normalization Committee (2024–2025) ====
On 19 August 2024, FIFA appointed him to be the president of the Normalization Committee it had set up to manage the affairs of the Tunisian Football Federation. On 25 November, Idir confirmed that the ordinary and extraordinary general assembly will take place on 21 December to modify certain articles of its statute and 25 January 2025 the date of the elective general assembly to design the new Federal office. On 21 December, the Extraordinary General Assembly was held where the financial and literary reports were presented and the new electoral laws were voted on. The session also revealed a financial deficit of 8 million dinars and outstanding debts owed by the clubs of 15 million dinars. On 25 December the Normalization Committee announced the opening of nominations for the 25 January elections. On 25 January, Moez Nasri was elected as a new Tunisian Football Federation president.

=== Professional career ===
Kamel Idir, who holds a doctorate from the Faculty of Pharmacy in Grenoble, teaches galenic pharmacy at the Faculty of Pharmacy of Monastir and holds the positions of Inspector General of Public Health and Director General of Pharmacy and Medicines at the Ministry of Health, as well as an expert at the World Health Organization and a permanent member of the National Medicines Commission. He also participates in the publication of several works, including the Tunisian Therapeutic Formulary (first and second editions) and the Guide to Medicines, and gives more than a hundred conferences. He received the 2010 Francophone Pharmacy Prize awarded by the French Academy of Pharmacy.

=== Political career ===
Idir's political career was marked by his vice-presidency of the municipality of Tunis, between 1995 and 2005. He was also a member of the central committee of the Democratic Constitutional Rally, the party in power under the presidency of Zine El Abidine Ben Ali, from 1998. In 2018, he headed the Nidaa Tounes list in Tunis for the 2018 Tunisian local elections. Following the said elections, he was elected a member of the Tunis Municipal Council. On 27 February 2019, he was appointed head of the committee preparing the electoral congress of the Tahya Tounes party.
