= Aïman Maurer =

Footballer (born 2004)

Personal information
- Date of birth: 25 September 2004 (age 22)
- Place of birth: Neuilly-sur-Seine, France
- Height: 1.81 m (5 ft 11 in)
- Position: Attacking midfielder

Team information
- Current team: RWD Molenbeek
- Number: 29

Youth career
- 2010–2013: AF Garenne-Colombes
- 2013–2016: Paris Saint-Germain
- 2017–2018: Boulogne-Billancourt
- 2018–2019: Red Star
- 2019–2022: Clermont

Senior career*
Years	Team	Apps	(Gls)
2022–2025	Clermont II	27	(10)
2023–2025	Clermont	23	(0)
2024	→ Dunkerque (loan)	14	(2)
2025–	RWD Molenbeek	35	(8)

International career^{‡}
2022	Morocco U18	8	(1)
- * Club domestic league appearances and goals as of 20 April 2026 ‡ National team caps and goals as of 23:34, 11 February 2023 (UTC)

Aïman Maurer (born 25 September 2004) is a professional footballer who plays as an attacking midfielder for Belgian club RWD Molenbeek. Born in France, he is a youth international for Morocco.

== Personal life ==
Aïmen Maurer was born in Clermont-Ferrand in the center of France. He holds French and Moroccan nationalities.

== Career ==
Maurer is a youth product of AF Garenne-Colombes, Paris Saint-Germain, Boulogne-Billancourt, and Red Star, before moving to the youth academy of Clermont in 2019. He signed his first professional contract with Clermont on 3 December 2022. He made his professional debut with Clermont as a starter in a 2–0 Ligue 1 loss to Monaco on 5 February 2023, and in doing so at the age of 18 and 4 months was their youngest ever professional debutant.

On 28 December 2023, Maurer joined Dunkerque in Ligue 2 on loan for the rest of the season.

On 30 January 2025, Maurer signed a two-and-a-half-year contract with RWD Molenbeek in the Belgian second-tier Challenger Pro League.

== International career ==
Maurer represented the Morocco U18s at the 2022 Mediterranean Games where he helped them achieve third place.
