= 2017 UNAF U-15 Tournament =

Tournament details
- Country: Morocco
- Dates: 20 – 24 August
- Teams: 4

Final positions
- Champions: Tunisia (1st title)
- Runners-up: Libya
- Third place: Morocco
- Fourth place: Algeria

Tournament statistics
- Matches played: 6
- Goals scored: 17 (2.83 per match)
- Top goal scorer(s): (Libya) Ashraf Al-Masrati (Libya) Anas Ali Al-Shabli (Morocco) Haitam Abaida (Tunisia) Hamdi Abidi (Tunisia) Mohamed Amine Ghabi (2 goals each)

The 2017 UNAF U-15 Tournament was the first edition of the UNAF U-15 Tournament. The tournament took place in Morocco from 20 to 24 August 2017.

== Participants ==
- Algeria
- Egypt (withdrew)
- Libya
- Morocco (hosts)
- Tunisia

== Venues ==
Sports Center of FAR, Salé

== Tournament ==
Team	Pld	W	D	L	GF	GA	GD	Pts
Tunisia	3	1	2	0	4	2	+2	5
Libya	3	1	2	0	6	5	+1	5
Morocco	3	0	2	1	4	5	−1	2
Algeria	3	0	2	1	3	5	−2	2

20 August 2017
15:45

Algeria	0–2	Tunisia
	Report	Abidi 3'; Ghabi 51'

Sports Center of FAR, Salé
20 August 2017
17:45

Morocco	2–3	Libya
El-Khiat 15'; Abaida 40'	Report	Al-Masrati 3', 66'; Ali 62'

Sports Center of FAR, Salé

22 August 2017
15:45

Morocco	1–1	Algeria
Hamdy 26'	Report	Bouras 80'
Penalties
	4–5 (Note: The winning team during the penalty shootout does not earn any additional points. However, in the equivalent of two teams in all the criteria adopted to determine the final standings, the number of points and then the direct matches and then the difference of the goal difference is given preference to the winning team on penalty shootout.)

Sports Center of FAR, Salé
22 August 2017
17:45

Tunisia	1–1	Libya
Ghabi 5' (pen.)	Report	Al-Shabli 18'
Penalties
	4–5

Sports Center of FAR, Salé

24 August 2017
15:45

Libya	2–2	Algeria
Al-Shabli 15'; Mohamed 80+8'	Report	Rahmouni 24'; Boucida 80+6'
Penalties
	5–6

Sports Center of FAR, Salé
Referee: Mohamed Chabane (Tunisia)
24 August 2017
17:45

Morocco	1–1	Tunisia
Abaida 63'	Report	Abidi 45'

Sports Center of FAR, Salé
Referee: Mohamed Saad Al-Mabrouk (Libya)

== Statistics ==
=== Goalscorers ===
2 goals

- (Libya) Ashraf Al-Masrati
- (Libya) Anas Ali Al-Shabli
- (Morocco) Haitam Abaida
- (Tunisia) Hamdi Abidi
- (Tunisia) Mohamed Amine Ghabi

1 goal

- (Algeria) Zakaria Boucida
- (Algeria) Ziad Bouras
- (Algeria) Wael Rahmouni
- (Libya) Al-Muntasir Billah Ali
- (Libya) Maab Mohamed
- (Morocco) Ahmed El-Khiat
- (Morocco) Ayman Hamdy

=== Awards ===
Fair play team

- Morocco
