= Mohamed Amine Essahel =

French footballer (born 2003)

Personal information
- Date of birth: 17 February 2003 (age 23)
- Place of birth: Morocco
- Height: 1.73 m (5 ft 8 in)
- Position: Midfielder

Team information
- Current team: Mohammed VI

Youth career
- 2017–2021: Mohammed VI Academy

Senior career*
Years	Team	Apps	(Gls)
2021–	Mohammed VI Academy	0	(0)
2021–2022	→ Eupen (loan)	1	(0)

International career^{‡}
2019	Morocco U17	4	(0)
2021	Morocco U20	3	(1)
- * Club domestic league appearances and goals as of 9 April 2022 ‡ National team caps and goals as of 18:40, 16 January 2022 (UTC)

Mohamed Amine Essahel (born 17 February 2003) is a Moroccan professional footballer who plays as a midfielder for Mohammed VI Academy.

== Professional career ==
Essahel is a youth product of Mohammed VI Football Academy, where he was considered one of their best prospects. Essahel joined the Belgian club Eupen on loan on 31 August 2021. He made his professional debut with Eupen in a 2–0 Belgian First Division A loss to Cercle Brugge on 16 January 2022.

== International career ==
Essahel is a youth international for Morocco, having represented the Morocco U17s, and U20s.
