= 2018 UNAF U-15 Tournament (Tunisia) =

بطولة إتحاد شمال إفريقيا لأقل من 15 سنة 2018

Tournament details
- Country: Tunisia
- Dates: 3 – 7 November
- Teams: 4

Final positions
- Champions: Morocco (1st title)
- Runners-up: Algeria
- Third place: Tunisia
- Fourth place: Libya

Tournament statistics
- Matches played: 6
- Goals scored: 17 (2.83 per match)
- Top goal scorer(s): (Algeria) Adel Boulbina (Morocco) El Mehdi Maouhoub (3 goals each)

The 2018 UNAF U-15 Tournament (Tunisia) was the third edition of the UNAF U-15 Tournament. The tournament took place in Tunisia from 3 to 7 November 2018.

== Participants ==
- Algeria
- Egypt (withdrew)
- Libya
- Morocco
- Tunisia (hosts)

== Venues ==
Cities	Venues	Capacity
Le Kram	Le Kram Stadium	5,000

== Tournament ==
Team	Pld	W	D	L	GF	GA	GD	Pts
Morocco	3	2	1	0	6	3	+3	7
Algeria	3	1	1	1	7	5	+2	4
Tunisia	3	0	3	0	2	2	0	3
Libya	3	0	1	2	2	7	−5	1

3 November 2018
13:00

Tunisia	0–0	Morocco

Le Kram Stadium, Le Kram
3 November 2018
15:00

Algeria	4–0	Libya
Boulbina 28' (pen.), 50'; Hammadi 35'; Gacem 38'

Le Kram Stadium, Le Kram

5 November 2018
13:00

Tunisia	1–1	Libya
Kifaia 70'		Al-Khatheer 78'

Le Kram Stadium, Le Kram
5 November 2018
15:00

Algeria	2–4	Morocco
Titraoui 9'; Gacem 58'		Mahouhoub 7', 12'; Essahel 47', 67'

Le Kram Stadium, Le Kram

7 November 2018
13:00

Morocco	2–1	Libya
El-Hailouli 56'; Mahouhoub 63'		Saad 10'

Le Kram Stadium, Le Kram
7 November 2018
15:00

Tunisia	1–1	Algeria
Saidi 73' (pen.)		Boulbina 40' (pen.)

Le Kram Stadium, Le Kram

== Goalscorers ==
3 goals

- (Algeria) Adil Boulbina
- (Morocco) El Mehdi Maouhoub

2 goals

- (Algeria) Mohamed Rayane Gacem
- (Morocco) Mohamed Amine Essahel

1 goal

- (Algeria) Abdelali Hammadi
- (Algeria) Yacine Titraoui
- (Libya) Mohamed Al-Khatheer
- (Libya) Mohamed Saad
- (Morocco) Mohamed El-Hailouli
- (Tunisia) Moataz Kifaia
- (Tunisia) Adem Saidi
