= Hammouda Ben Ammar =

Tunisian handball player

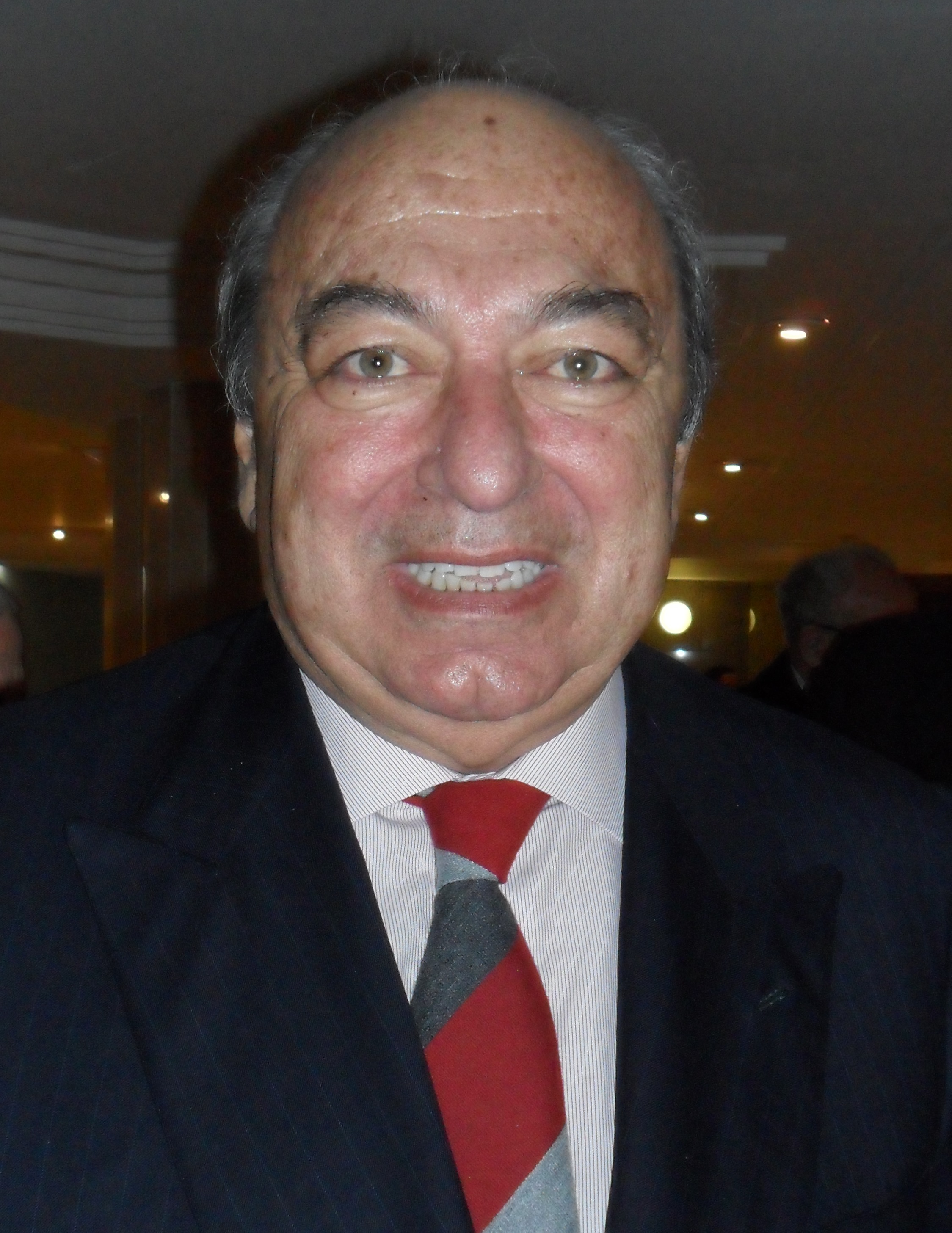
- Hammouda Ben Ammar in 2013

President of Tunisian Football Federation
- In office 2002–2006
- Preceded by: Aboulhassen Fekih
- Succeeded by: Ali Labiadh

Personal details
- Born: March 14, 1948 (age 78) Tunis, Tunisia
- Occupation: Businessman; Sport manager

Hammouda Ben Ammar (Arabic: حمودة بن عمار), born 14 March 1948 in Tunis, Tunisia, is a Tunisian former handball player and football personality.

== Career ==
Born in the Tunisian district of Bab Jedid, holder of a doctorate in law obtained from the Faculty of Law of Paris, he plays in the handball section of a multi-sports club in Tunis, the Club African.

Subsequently, he presided over the club between 1994 and 1996 before taking the head of the Tunisian Football Federation between 2002 and 2006. During his mandate, the men's national football team obtained its only continental title, the 2004 African Cup of Nations.

== Decorations ==
- Grand Officer of the National Order of Merit (Tunisia; 1 July 2003)
