= Ivane Chegra =

Footballer (born 2004)

Personal information
- Date of birth: 3 March 2004 (age 22)
- Place of birth: Montreuil, France
- Height: 1.80 m (5 ft 11 in)
- Position: Winger

Team information
- Current team: Egaleo
- Number: 47

Youth career
- FC Bussy Saint-Georges
- FC Montfermeil
- 2021–2022: Ajaccio

Senior career*
Years	Team	Apps	(Gls)
2022–2025	Ajaccio II	43	(10)
2023–2025	Ajaccio	32	(0)
2024	→ Cholet (loan)	2	(0)
2025–	Egaleo	7	(0)

International career^{‡}
2022	Algeria U18	1	(0)
- * Club domestic league appearances and goals as of 29 November 2025 ‡ National team caps and goals as of 19:55, 30 April 2023 (UTC)

Ivane Chegra (Arabic: إيفان شيجرا; born 3 March 2004) is a professional footballer who plays as a winger for Super League Greece 2 club Egaleo. Born in France, he is a youth international for Algeria.

== Early life ==
Ivane Chegra was born in Montreuil, in the eastern suburbs of Paris. He holds French and Algerian nationalities.

== Club career ==
Chegra is a youth product of FC Bussy Saint-Georges and FC Montfermeil, before signing a professional contract with Ajaccio on 4 June 2021. He made his professional debut with Ajaccio as a substitute in a 3–0 Ligue 1 loss to Lille on 29 April 2023.

On 30 January 2024, Chegra was loaned by Cholet of Championnat National.

In September 2025, Chegra joined Super League Greece 2 club Egaleo on a two-year deal.

== International career ==
Chegra represented the Algeria U18s at the 2022 Mediterranean Games.
