= Mehdi Puch =

Footballer (born 2004)

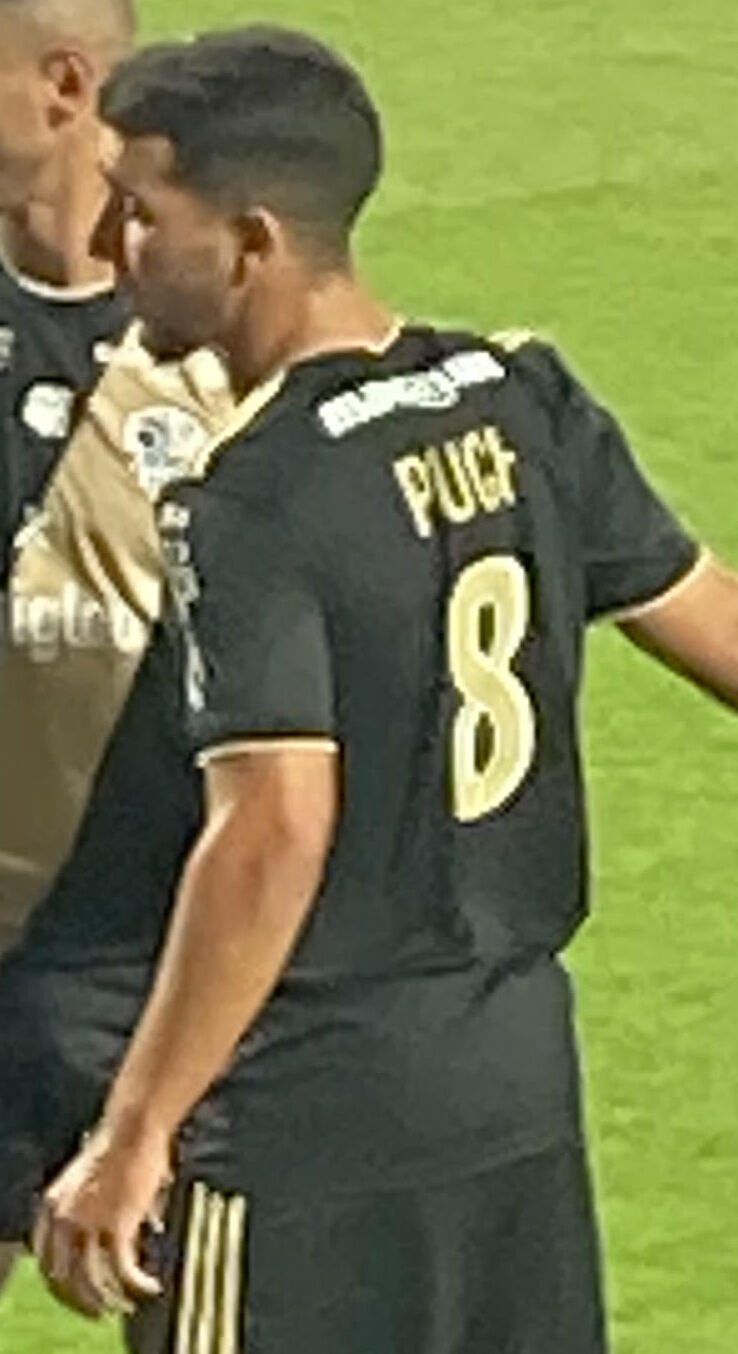
- Puch with Ajaccio in 2024

Personal information
- Full name: Mehdi Guillermo Moh Puch-Herrantz
- Date of birth: 20 January 2004 (age 22)
- Place of birth: Paris, France
- Height: 1.75 m (5 ft 9 in)
- Position: Defensive midfielder

Team information
- Current team: Hércules
- Number: 37

Youth career
- 2008–2015: Sevran FC
- 2015–2022: FC Villepinte
- 2015–2022: Torcy
- 2015–2021: FC Montfermeil

Senior career*
Years	Team	Apps	(Gls)
2021–2025	Ajaccio II	44	(1)
2023–2025	Ajaccio	40	(0)
2025–	Hércules	18	(2)

International career^{‡}
2022	Algeria U18	3	(1)
- * Club domestic league appearances and goals as of 10 June 2026 ‡ National team caps and goals as of 19:40, 30 April 2023 (UTC)

Mehdi Guillermo Moh Puch-Herrantz (Arabic: مهدي بوش هيرانتز; born 20 January 2004), known as Mehdi Puch, is a professional footballer who plays as a defensive midfielder for Spanish Primera Federación club Hércules. Born in France, he is a former youth international for Algeria.

== Career ==
Puch is a youth product of Sevran FC, FC Villepinte, Torcy and Montfermeil, before moving to the reserves of AC Ajaccio in 2021. On 25 August 2022, he signed a professional contract with the club for 5 years. He made his professional debut with Ajaccio as a late substitute in a 3–0 Ligue 1 loss to Nice on 10 February 2023.

On 12 November 2025, Puch signed for Spanish third tier team Hércules for a 1-year deal with extension clause. He was technically assigned to the reserve squad initially, but never made an appearance for the reserves, debuting for the main squad after the league registration window opened in January.

== International career ==
Born in France, Puch is of Algerian and Spanish descent. He represented the Algeria U18s at the 2022 Mediterranean Games. He scored the game-winning goal from outside the box in a 1–0 win over the Spain U18s in the side's first match in the tournament.
