= 2019 UNAF U-18 Tournament =

Tournament details
- Country: Egypt
- Dates: 4 – 14 April
- Teams: 5

Final positions
- Champions: Morocco
- Runners-up: Egypt
- Third place: Algeria

Tournament statistics
- Matches played: 10
- Goals scored: 28 (2.8 per match)
- Top goal scorer(s): (Morocco) Achraf Gharib (6 goals)

The 2019 UNAF U-18 Tournament was the 2nd edition of the UNAF U-18 Tournament. The tournament took place in Alexandria, Egypt, from 4 to 14 April 2019.

== Participants ==
- Algeria
- Egypt (hosts)
- Morocco
- Kenya U17 (invited)
- Tanzania (invited)

Withrawed teams

- Libya (withdrew)
- Tunisia (withdrew)

== Venues ==
Cities	Venues	Capacity
Alexandria	Tolip Stadium	5,000

== Tournament ==
Team	Pld	W	D	L	GF	GA	GD	Pts
Morocco	4	3	1	0	7	1	+6	10
Egypt	4	2	2	0	4	1	+3	8
Algeria	4	2	1	1	9	4	+5	7
Tanzania	4	1	0	3	5	11	−6	3
Kenya U17	4	0	0	4	3	11	−8	0

6 April 2019
15:15

Egypt	1–0	Kenya
Eid 74'	Report

Tolip Stadium, Alexandria
6 April 2019
16:00

Algeria	3–1	Tanzania
Bekrar 10'; Boukerma 66'; Droufi 77'	Report	Hames 80'

Tolip Stadium, Alexandria

8 April 2019
15:15

Egypt	2–0	Tanzania
Mohammed ali 3'; Ali Mohamed 25' (pen.)	Report

Tolip Stadium, Alexandria
8 April 2019
16:00

Morocco	1–0	Algeria
Gharib 68'	Report

Tolip Stadium, Alexandria

10 April 2019
15:15

Algeria	5–1	Kenya
Belkheir 4'; Boukerma 20', 80'; Bouzidad 23'; Aouane 27'	Report	Mwendwa 69'

Tolip Stadium, Alexandria
10 April 2019
16:00

Tanzania	1–4	Morocco
Misungui 35' (pen.)	Report	Gharib 24', 26', 37' (pen.); Ouhati 80'

Tolip Stadium, Alexandria

12 April 2019
15:15

Kenya	2–3	Tanzania
Apoel 19'; Kivington 38'	Report	Hames 5', 24', 54'

Tolip Stadium, Alexandria
12 April 2019
16:00

Egypt	0–0	Morocco
	Report

Tolip Stadium, Alexandria

14 April 2019
15:15

Morocco	2–0	Kenya
Gharib 43', 80'	Report

Tolip Stadium, Alexandria
14 April 2019
16:00

Egypt	1–1	Algeria
Eid 33'	Report	Bara 79'

Tolip Stadium, Alexandria

== Goalscorers ==
6 goals

- (Morocco) Achraf Gharib

4 goals

- (Tanzania) Mostafa Kandoro Hames

3 goals

- (Algeria) Mohamed Boukerma

1 goal

- (Algeria) Lotfi Aouane
- (Algeria) Khalil Bara
- (Algeria) Mohamed Islam Belkheir
- (Algeria) Moncef Bekrar
- (Algeria) Belkacem Bouzidad
- (Algeria) Marouane Droufi
- (Egypt) Ahmed Mesaad Kamal
- (Egypt) Mahmoud Saber Abdel Mohsen
- (Egypt) Ibrahim Adel Ali Mohamed
- (Egypt) Ahmed Eid Mohamed
- (Kenya) Ikinu Izaye Apoel
- (Kenya) Mashika Kivington
- (Kenya) Mathew Mwendwa
- (Morocco) Ayman Ouhatti
- (Tanzania) Husein Ali Misungui

== Awards ==
Fairplay team

- Tanzania
