= 2018 UNAF U-15 Tournament =

بطولة إتحاد شمال إفريقيا لأقل من 15 سنة 2018

Tournament details
- Host country: Algeria
- Dates: 11 – 15 April
- Teams: 3 (from 1 confederation)
- Venue: 1 (in 1 host city)

Final positions
- Champions: Libya (1st title)
- Runners-up: Algeria
- Third place: Tunisia

Tournament statistics
- Matches played: 3
- Goals scored: 9 (3 per match)
- Top scorer(s): (Libya) Mohamed Adel Ramadan (4 goals)

The 2018 UNAF U-15 Tournament is the second edition of the UNAF U-15 Tournament. The tournament took place in Algeria from 11 to 15 April 2018. The start of the tournament was scheduled for 11 April but was postponed to 12 April.

== Participants ==
- Algeria (hosts)
- Egypt (withdrew)
- Libya
- Mauritania (invited & withdrew)
- Morocco (withdrew)
- Tunisia

== Venues ==
Stade Akid Lotfi, Tlemcen

== Tournament ==
| Team | Pld | W | D | L | GF | GA | GD | Pts |
|---|---|---|---|---|---|---|---|---|
| Libya | 2 | 1 | 1 | 0 | 4 | 2 | +2 | 4 |
| Algeria | 2 | 1 | 1 | 0 | 3 | 2 | +1 | 4 |
| Tunisia | 2 | 0 | 0 | 2 | 2 | 5 | −3 | 0 |

12 April 2018
11:00

| Algeria | 2–1 | Tunisia |
|---|---|---|
| Boulbina 20'; Gacem 38' | | Benali 90' (pen.) |

Stade Akid Lotfi, Tlemcen
Referee: Moataz Al-Shalmani (Libya)

13 April 2018
17:00

| Libya | 3–1 | Tunisia |
|---|---|---|
| Ramadan 1', 46', 71' | | Lamine 46' |

Stade Akid Lotfi, Tlemcen
Referee: ... (Algeria)

15 April 2018
17:00

| Algeria | 1–1 | Libya |
|---|---|---|
| Boulbina 59' | | Ramadan 26' (pen.) |

Stade Akid Lotfi, Tlemcen
Referee: Yesri Bouali (Tunisia)

== Goalscorers ==
4 goals

- (Libya) Mohamed Adel Ramadan

2 goal

- (Algeria) Adil Boulbina

1 goal

- (Algeria) Mohamed Rayan Gacem
- (Tunisia) Mohamed Amine Benali
- (Tunisia) Nafaa Lamine
