= Tunisia national under-15 football team =

Men's national association football team representing Tunisia

Tunisia U-15
- Nickname(s): نسور قرطاج (Eagles of Carthage)
- Association: Tunisian Football Federation
- Other affiliation: UAFA (Arab World)
- Confederation: CAF (Africa)
- Sub-confederation: UNAF (North Africa)
- Home stadium: Hammadi Agrebi Stadium
- FIFA code: TUN
First colours	Second colours	Third colours

FIFA U-15 World Cup & Festival
- Appearances: 1 (first in 2026)
- Best result: 66th place (2026)

UNAF U-15 Tournament
- Appearances: 3 (first in 2017)
- Best result: Champions (2017)

The Tunisia national under-15 football team has represented Tunisia in men's international association football for players aged 15 or under. The team is administered by the Tunisian Football Federation (TFF), which governs football in Tunisia. On a continental level, the team competes under the Confederation of African Football (CAF), which governs associate football in Africa, and is also affiliated with FIFA for global competitions. Additionally, the team is a member of the Union of North African Football (UNAF) and the Union of Arab Football Associations (UAFA). The team is colloquially known as Eagles of Carthage by fans and the media, with the bald eagle serving as its symbol. Their home kit is primarily white and their away kit is red, which is a reference to the national flag of the country.

The team participated in the UNAF U-15 Tournament three times in 2017, 2018 in Algeria and 2018 at home. He won the title in his first participation and third place in the last two participations, while he did not enter the 2019 edition.

In 2026, Tunisia entered the inaugural edition of the FIFA U-15 World Cup & Festival, which featured 189 participants. The team was placed in Group D, where they secured victories against Nepal 3–1, the DR Congo 3–1, and Guinea-Bissau 6–4, while suffering two defeats against El Salvador 1–2 and Brazil 1–2. The team finished in third place, advancing to the knockout stage for Tier C. In the Round of 32, they defeated Namibia 4–0; in the Round of 16, they beat Thailand 5–0; in the quarter-finals, the team secured a historic 5–3 victory against France; and in the semi-finals, they won 3–0 against Luxembourg, to advance to the Tier C final. In the final, the team was defeated 3–0 by Belarus, finishing the tournament in the 66th place.

== Competitive Records ==
Champions Runners-up Third place Fourth place

- Red border color indicates tournament was held on home soil.

=== FIFA U-15 World Cup & Festival ===
FIFA U-15 World Cup & Festival record
Year	Round	Position	Pld	W	D*	L	GF	GA
(Azerbaijan) 2026	Tier C final	66th	10	7	0	3	31	16
Total	Tier C final	1/1	10	7	0	3	31	16

=== UNAF U-15 Tournament ===
UNAF U-15 Tournament record
Year	Round	Position	Pld	W	D*	L	GF	GA
(Morocco) 2017	Champions	1st	3	1	2	0	4	2
(Algeria) Apr 2018	Third place	3rd	2	0	0	2	2	5
(Tunisia) Nov 2018	Third place	3rd	3	0	3	0	2	2
(Algeria) 2019	Did not enter							
Total	1 Title	3/4	8	1	5	2	8	9

== Honours ==
- UNAF U-15 Tournament

(gold) Champions (1): 2017
(bronze) Third Place (2): Apr 2018, Nov 2018

== See also ==
- Tunisia national football team
- Tunisia A' national football team
- Tunisia national under-23 football team
- Tunisia national under-20 football team
- Tunisia national under-18 football team
- Tunisia national under-17 football team
