= Algeria national under-15 football team =

National association football team

Algeria U-15
- Association: Algerian Football Federation
- Other affiliation: UAFA (Arab World)
- Confederation: CAF (Africa)
- Sub-confederation: UNAF (North Africa)
- Head coach: Rezki Remane
- FIFA code: ALG
First colours	Second colours

UNAF U-15 Tournament
- Appearances: 1 (first in 2017)
- Best result: Runners-up: Apr 2018, Nov 2018, 2019

The Algeria national under-15 football team is the national under-15 football team of Algeria and is controlled by the Algerian Football Federation. The team competes in the UNAF U-15 Tournament.

== Honours ==
- UNAF U-15 Tournament:

Runners-up (3): Apr 2018, Nov 2018, 2019

== Tournament Records ==
=== FIFA U-15 World Cup & Festival ===
FIFA U-15 World Cup & Festival record
Year	Round	Position	Pld	W	D*	L	GF	GA
(Azerbaijan) 2026	Qualified							
Total		1/1						

=== Youth Olympic Games record ===
Youth Olympic Games record
Year	Round	Position	Pld	W	D*	L	GF	GA
(Singapore) 2010	Did not enter							
(China) 2014	Did not enter							
(Argentina) 2018	No tournament							
(Senegal) 2022	No tournament							
Total		0/2						

=== UNAF U-15 Tournament record ===
UNAF U-15 Tournament record
Year	Round	Position	Pld	W	D*	L	GF	GA
(Morocco) 2017	Fourth place	4th	3	0	2	1	3	5
(Algeria) Apr 2018	Runners-up	2nd	2	1	1	0	3	2
(Tunisia) Nov 2018	Runners-up	2nd	3	1	1	1	7	5
(Algeria) 2019	Runners-up	2nd	3	2	0	1	7	2
Total	Runners-up	4/4	11	4	4	3	20	14
