= Wadie Jary =

Tunisian association football player

President of Tunisian Football Federation
- In office 2012–2023
- Preceded by: Anouar Haddad
- Succeeded by: Wassef Jelaiel (acting)

President of Union of North African Football
- In office 2014–2018
- Preceded by: Ali Fassi-Fihri
- Succeeded by: Jamal Al-Jaafari

Personal details
- Born: 1972 (age 53–54) Ben Guerdane, Tunisia
- Occupation: Sports official

Wadie Jary (Arabic: وديع الجريء; born in 1972) is a former Tunisian footballer and sports official. He was president of the Tunisian Football Federation between 2021 and 2023. He briefly played as a defender with the US Ben Guerdane and managed the club from 2002 to 2006. He later became a football official, heading the Tunisian Football Federation from 2012 until his arrest on 25 October 2023, for charges of financial and administrative corruption and match fixing.

== Career ==
Wadie Jary (left) with Minister of the Interior, Hédi Majdoub in 2016.

A doctor by profession, he played for the US Ben Guerdane and then chaired the club for five years. He also served on the Tunisian Football Federation's federal board for six years, serving on several of its committees, such as the youth and national team committees, and chairing its medical committee. He was elected president of the Tunisian Football Federation in 2012 and re-elected in 2016 and 2020. In this capacity, he was also elected head of the Union of North African Football in 2014. On 12 March 2021, Wadie Jary was appointed to the Confederation of African Football's executive committee at its general assembly held in Rabat, Morocco; he was the only candidate from the northern zone for this position, making him the fourth Tunisian to serve on the committee.

In February 2023, Jary does not have the right to leave Tunisian territory following a court decision because he is the target of several investigations relating to the organization of match-fixing, cases of money laundering, embezzlement funds and corruption. On 25 October 2023, he was arrested and detained in Mornaguia prison.

On 24 April 2024, the investigating judge at the Court of First Instance of Tunis notified him of the extension of his pretrial detention for an additional four-month period. On 20 February 2025, the criminal chamber of the Court of First Instance of Tunis sentenced him to four years in prison and a ban on holding public office. He was ultimately granted a pardon on 25 July 2026, on the occasion of Republic Day by the President of the Republic, Kais Saied.
