= Moez Nasri =

Tunisian sports executive

President of Tunisian Football Federation
- Incumbent
- Assumed office 25 January 2025
- Preceded by: Kamel Idir

Personal details
- Born: 1972 (age 53–54) Bizerte, Tunisia
- Occupation: Lawyer; Sport management

Moez Nasri (Arabic: معز الناصري; born on 1972 in Bizerte, Tunisia) is a Tunisian official, lawyer, and sports executive who has been President of the Tunisian Football Federation since 25 January 2025.

== Career ==
He studied law at the Tunis El Manar University and then pursued his higher education in France. Nasri began his career as general secretary at the CA Bizertin, before becoming a member of the board of directors. He served as chairman of the Appeals Committee of the Tunisian Football Federation before being elected to its presidency on 25 January 2025. He also served as a member of the Appeals Committee of the Confederation of African Football (CAF). On 15 September 2025, he was elected chairman of the Appeals Committee of the Union of Arab Football Associations (UAFA).
