= Tolip Stadium =

Football stadium

Coordinates: 31°00′11″N 29°43′56″E

- Borg El Arab Stadium subfield
- Interactive map of Tolip Stadium
- Location: Borg El Arab, Alexandria, Egypt
- Owner: Egyptian Football Association
- Capacity: 5,000
- Surface: Grass

Construction
- Groundbreaking: 2005
- Opened: 2007

Tolip Stadium (Arabic: ستاد توليب), commonly referred to as Borg El Arab Stadium subfield (Arabic: ستاد برج العرب الفرعي), is a football stadium in Borg El Arab, Alexandria, Egypt. It is located near Borg El Arab Stadium, and is mostly used as a training ground for teams before matches at the main stadium. The stadium is also used by Pharco to host some of their home matches, and sometimes by the Egyptian national U-23 team to host their friendly matches.

During the 2017–18 Egyptian Premier League season, El Raja, a club from Mersa Matruh, used Tolip Stadium as their home ground because there was no suitable stadium in Mersa Matruh to host Egyptian Premier League matches.

== See also ==
- Borg El Arab Stadium
- Alexandria Stadium
- Haras El Hodoud Stadium
- Sports in Alexandria
