= La Pobla de Mafumet =

- Municipality
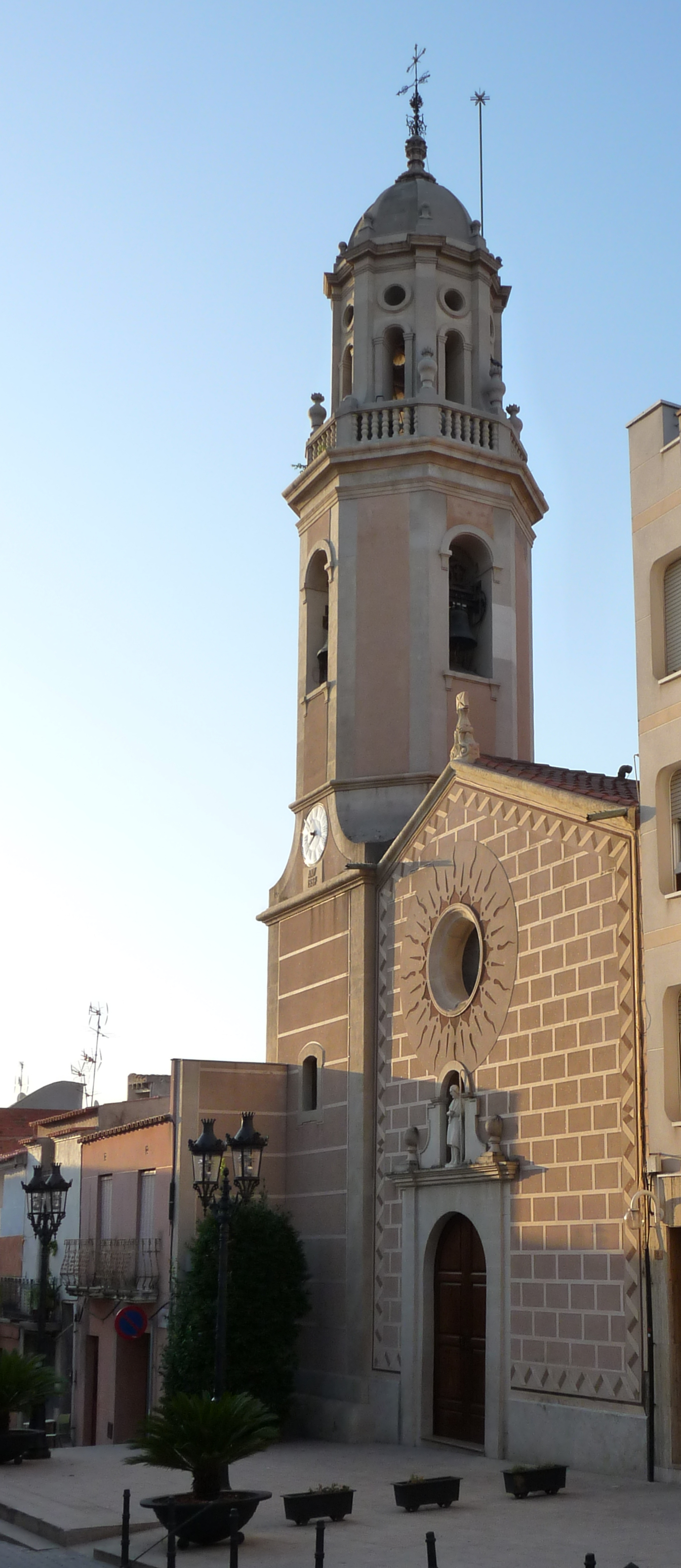

- Flag Coat of arms

- Location in Catalonia
- Coordinates: 41°11′20″N 1°12′42″E
- Country: Spain
- Community: Catalonia
- Province: Tarragona
- Comarca: Tarragonès

Government
  - Mayor: Joan Maria Sardà Padrell (2015)

Area
  - Total: 6.2 km^{2} (2.4 sq mi)
- Elevation: 96 m (315 ft)

Population (2025-01-01)
  - Total: 4,175
  - Density: 670/km^{2} (1,700/sq mi)
- Website: www.poblamafumet.cat

La Pobla de Mafumet (Old Catalan for 'Muhammad's settlement'; Catalan pronunciation: [lə ˈpobːlə ðə məfuˈmɛt]) is a small town in the comarca of the Tarragonès, in the province of Tarragona, Catalonia Autonomous Community, Spain. It has a population of 4,175 (register office, 2025).
