= UNAF U-15 Tournament =

- Organiser(s): UNAF
- Founded: 2017; 9 years ago
- Region: North Africa
- Teams: 5 (plus guests)
- Current champions: Morocco (2nd title)
- Most championships: Morocco (2 titles)
- Website: unafonline.org

The UNAF U-15 Tournament is an international youth football tournament organized by the Union of North African Football (UNAF) for its nations consisting of players under the age of 15. However, the tournament invites teams from other nations.

Morocco are the most successful nation winning the tournament two times.

== Results ==
| Ed. | Year | Host | First place game | | | Third place game | | |
| Ed. | Year | Host | (gold) Champion | Score | (silver) Runner-up | (bronze) Third place | Score | Fourth place |
|---|---|---|---|---|---|---|---|---|
| 1 | 2017 | Morocco | Tunisia | round-robin | Libya | Morocco | round-robin | Algeria |
| 2 | Apr 2018 | Algeria | Libya | 0–0 (6–5 p) | Algeria | Tunisia | | |
| 3 | Nov 2018 | Tunisia | Morocco | round-robin | Algeria | Tunisia | round-robin | Libya |
| 4 | 2019 | Algeria | Morocco | round-robin | Algeria | Libya | round-robin | Mauritania |

== Statistics ==
=== Summary ===
| Team | Winners | Runners-up | Third place | Fourth place |
|---|---|---|---|---|
| Morocco | 2 (Nov 2018, 2019) | — | 1 (2017*) | — |
| Libya | 1 (Apr 2018) | 1 (2017) | 1 (2019) | 1 (Nov 2018) |
| Tunisia | 1 (2017) | — | 2 (Apr 2018, Nov 2018*) | — |
| Algeria | — | 3 (Apr 2018*, Nov 2018, 2019*) | — | 1 (2017) |
| Mauritania | — | — | — | 1 (2019) |

* Hosts
Italic Invited nation

=== Participating nations ===
| Team | (Morocco) 2017 | (Algeria) 2018 | (Tunisia) 2018 | (Algeria) 2019 | Apps. |
|---|---|---|---|---|---|
| Algeria | 4th | 2nd | 2nd | 2nd | 4 |
| Egypt | × | × | × | × | 0 |
| Libya | 2nd | 1st | 4th | 3rd | 4 |
| Morocco | 3rd | × | 1st | 1st | 3 |
| Tunisia | 1st | 3rd | 3rd | × | 3 |
Invited nations
| Mauritania | | × | | 4th | 1 |

- 1st – Champions
- 2nd – Runners-up
- 3rd – Third place
- 4th – Fourth place
- Q – Qualified for upcoming tournament
- × — Did not enter / Withdrew / Disqualified
- — Hosts

== See also ==
- UNAF U-23 Tournament
- UNAF U-20 Tournament
- UNAF U-18 Tournament
- UNAF U-17 Tournament
- UNAF U-16 Tournament
