= Morocco national under-18 football team =

Morocco U-18
- Association: Royal Moroccan Football Federation
- Confederation: CAF (Africa)
- Head coach: Mohamed Ouahbi
- FIFA code: MAR
First colours	Second colours

The Morocco national under-18 football team is the national representative for Morocco in international under-18 football competition, and is controlled by the Royal Moroccan Football Federation. The team competes in the Mediterranean Games, which is held every four years. The under-18 team also participates in local and international friendly tournaments.

== Competitive Records ==
=== UNAF U-18 Tournament ===
UNAF U-18 Tournament record
Year	Round	Position	Pld	W	D*	L	GF	GA
(Tunisia) 2017	Runner-up	2nd	3	1	1	1	3	3
(Egypt) 2019	Champions	1st	4	3	1	0	7	1
Total	1 Title	2/3	7	4	2	1	10	4

== Current squad ==
- The following players were called up for the Football at the 2022 Mediterranean Games.
- Match dates: 26 June – 5 July 2022
- Caps and goals correct as of: 26 June 2022

No.	Pos.	Player	Date of birth (age)	Caps	Goals	Club
	GK	Walid Hasbi	7 January 2004 (age 22)	0	0	(Royal Moroccan Football Federation) Académie Mohammed VI
	GK	Elias Mago	23 March 2004 (age 21)	0	0	(Royal Belgian Football Association) Standard Liège
	DF	Abdessamad Ammal	19 August 2004 (age 21)	0	0	(Royal Moroccan Football Federation) AS FAR
	DF	Ayoub Hammami	1 February 2004 (age 22)	0	0	(Royal Moroccan Football Federation) Académie Mohammed VI
	DF	Ahmed Khatir	14 March 2005 (age 20)	0	0	(Royal Moroccan Football Federation) Académie Mohammed VI
	DF	Wassim Lantaki	17 February 2004 (age 22)	0	0	(French Football Federation) Lille
	MF	Oussama Lyakoubi	23 April 2005 (age 20)	0	0	(Royal Moroccan Football Federation) Académie Mohammed VI
	DF	Anouar Khalid Tamoune	18 June 2004 (age 21)	0	0	(Royal Moroccan Football Federation) AS FAR
	MF	Hamza Anhari	30 January 2004 (age 22)	0	0	(German Football Association) MSV Duisburg
	MF	Usama Arhoun	7 March 2004 (age 22)	0	0	(Royal Spanish Football Federation) Málaga CF
	MF	Abdellah Baallal	7 November 2004 (age 21)	0	0	(Royal Moroccan Football Federation) Académie Mohammed VI
	MF	Othmane Boukhres	12 September 2004 (age 21)	0	0	(Royal Moroccan Football Federation) AS FAR
	MF	Yassine Khalifi	9 August 2005 (age 20)	0	0	(Royal Moroccan Football Federation) Académie Mohammed VI
	MF	Mohamed Jazouli	4 July 2005 (age 20)	0	0	(Royal Moroccan Football Federation) Académie Mohammed VI
	FW	Youness Akharraz	4 May 2004 (age 21)	0	0	(Royal Moroccan Football Federation) Académie Mohammed VI
	FW	Aïman Maurer	25 September 2004 (age 21)	0	0	(French Football Federation) Clermont Foot
	FW	Abdellah Raihani	3 February 2004 (age 22)	0	0	(Royal Spanish Football Federation) Atlético Madrid
	FW	Omar Sadik	22 March 2004 (age 21)	0	0	(Royal Moroccan Football Federation) Académie Mohammed VI

== See also ==
- Morocco national football team
- Morocco national under-23 football team
- Morocco national under-20 football team
- Morocco national under-17 football team
- Football at the Mediterranean Games
