= Sala Al Jadida =

City in Morocco, in the suburbs of Rabat

Sala Al Jadida Salaaljadida / سلا الجديدة
- Interactive map of Sala Al Jadida
- Coordinates: 33°59′45″N 6°44′10″W
- Country: Morocco
- Region: Rabat-Salé-Kénitra
- Prefecture: Salé

Population (2014)
  - Total: 200,000
- Time zone: UTC+0 (GMT)

Sala Al Jadida (Arabic: سلا الجديدة) is a city in central Morocco with a population of 200,000 recorded in the 2014 Moroccan census. It is situated on the suburbs of Salé and Rabat. In Arabic, "Sala Al Jadida" translates to "New Salé".
