= Algeria national under-18 football team =

Algeria U-18
- Nickname(s): الأفنــاك (Fennec foxes)
- Association: Algerian Football Federation
- Confederation: CAF (Africa)
- Head coach: Mourad Slatni
- FIFA code: ALG
First colours	Second colours

The Algeria national under-18 football team is the national representative for Algeria in international under-18 football competitions, and is controlled by the Algerian Football Federation. The team competes in the Mediterranean Games, which are held every four years. The under-18 team also participates in local and international friendly tournaments.

== Competitive records ==
=== UNAF U-18 Tournament ===
UNAF U-18 Tournament record
Year	Round	Position	Pld	W	D*	L	GF	GA
(Tunisia) 2017	Third Place	3rd	3	1	1	1	4	4
(Egypt) 2019	Third Place	3rd	4	2	1	1	9	4
Total	Third Place	2/3	7	3	2	2	13	8

== Current squad ==
- The following players were called up for the Football at the 2022 Mediterranean Games.
- Match dates: 26 June – 5 July 2022
- Caps and goals correct as of: 12 October 2021, after the match against France

No.	Pos.	Player	Date of birth (age)	Caps	Goals	Club
	GK	Abdelaziz Boumengouche	8 February 2004 (age 22)	0	0	
	GK	Hamza Boualam	20 September 2004 (age 22)	0	0	(Algerian Football Federation) USM Alger
	DF	Mohamed Islem Abdelkader	6 February 2004 (age 22)	0	0	
	DF	Abdessamed Bounacer	11 December 2004 (age 21)	0	0	
	DF	Fouad Hanfoug	23 January 2004 (age 22)	0	0	
	DF	Djibril Nottebaere	28 December 2004 (age 21)	0	0	(French Football Federation) Amiens
	DF	Salah Eddine Zaoui	25 April 2004 (age 22)	0	0	
	MF	Al Amin Aïd	30 September 2004 (age 22)	2	0	(French Football Federation) Olympique Lyonnais
	MF	Mohamed Said Ben Mazouz	22 March 2004 (age 22)	0	0	
	MF	Ouanisse Bouzahzah	7 October 2004 (age 21)	0	0	
	MF	Adam Ghybril Djadi	30 March 2004 (age 22)	0	0	
	MF	Abdelghani Laallam	6 July 2004 (age 22)	0	0	
	MF	Mehdi Puch-Herrantz	20 January 2004 (age 22)	0	0	(French Football Federation) Ajaccio
	MF	Edhy Yvan Zulliani	11 August 2004 (age 22)	0	0	(French Football Federation) Toulouse FC
	FW	Lahlou Akhrib	24 April 2005 (age 21)	0	0	(Algerian Football Federation) Kabylie
	FW	Ivane Chegra	3 March 2004 (age 22)	0	0	(French Football Federation) Ajaccio
	FW	Adam Dougui	2 February 2004 (age 22)	0	0	(The Football Association) Queens Park Rangers
	FW	Mohamed Rafik Omar	10 January 2004 (age 22)	0	0	(Algerian Football Federation) Academie FAF

== See also ==
- Algeria national football team
- Algeria national under-23 football team
- Algeria national under-20 football team
- Algeria national under-17 football team
- Football at the Mediterranean Games
