= UNAF U-18 Tournament =

- Organiser(s): UNAF
- Founded: 2017; 9 years ago
- Region: North Africa
- Teams: 5 (plus guests)
- Current champions: Morocco (1st title)
- Most championships: Morocco; Tunisia (1 title each)
- Website: unafonline.org

The UNAF U-18 Tournament is an international youth football tournament organized by the Union of North African Football (UNAF) for its nations consisting of players under the age of 18. However, the tournament invites teams from other nations.

== Results ==
Year	Host	First place game			Third place game		
Year	Host	(gold) Champion	Score	(silver) Runner-up	(bronze) Third place	Score	Fourth place
2017	Tunisia	Tunisia	round-robin	Morocco	Algeria	round-robin	Libya
2019	Egypt	Morocco	round-robin	Egypt	Algeria	round-robin	Tanzania

== Statistics ==
=== Summary ===
Team	Winners	Runners-up	Third place	Fourth place
Morocco	1 (2019)	1 (2017)	—	—
Tunisia	1 (2017)	—	—	—
Egypt	—	1 (2019)	—	—
Algeria	—	—	2 (2017, 2019)	—
Libya	—	—	—	1 (2017)
Tanzania	—	—	—	1 (2019)

* Hosts
Italic Invited nation

=== Participating nations ===
Team	(Tunisia) 2017	(Egypt) 2019	Apps.
Algeria	3rd	3rd	2
Egypt	×	2nd	1
Libya	4th	×	1
Morocco	2nd	1st	2
Tunisia	1st	×	1
Invited nations
Kenya		5th	1
Tanzania		4th	1

- 1st – Champions
- 2nd – Runners-up
- 3rd – Third place
- 4th – Fourth place
- 5th – Fifth place
- Q – Qualified for upcoming tournament
- × — Did not enter / Withdrew / Disqualified
- — Hosts

== See also ==
- UNAF U-23 Tournament
- UNAF U-20 Tournament
- UNAF U-17 Tournament
- UNAF U-16 Tournament
- UNAF U-15 Tournament
