= Mohammed VI Football Academy =

Moroccan football club

- Founded: 2009; 17 years ago
- Ground: Salé, Morocco
- Owner: Royal Moroccan Football Federation
- Website: amf.ac.ma
Home colours	Away colours

The Mohammed VI Football Academy (AMF; Arabic: أكاديمية محمد السادس لكرة القدم, romanized: ʽakādīmiyya Muḥammad as-sādis li-kurat al-qadam) is a football academy located in Salé, Morocco. It was inaugurated in 2009 by King Mohammed VI as part of a national initiative to promote and modernize football infrastructure in the country.

The academy focuses on identifying and training young Moroccan players, providing both athletic and academic education. Its objective is to support the development of professional footballers and contribute to the overall improvement of Moroccan football.

== Foundation and development ==
=== Background ===
The project followed a series of programmes established by Mohammed VI and his advisors to ensure the development of Morocco. This project was inspired by the lack of sports facilities and shortage of talented footballers in the country. In this case, the construction of a football academy was planned to promote sports in Morocco and produce the next generation of footballers.

=== Objectives ===
This project was conceived to attain certain objectives including:

- Finding young talents across the country
- Targeting underprivileged areas in Rabat
- Implementing a Sport-Study curriculum
- Developing the national Football field
- Preparing junior footballers for professional leagues

=== Foundation ===
In 2007, the Moroccan monarch instructed Groupe 3 Architectes to build a football academy in Sala Al Jadida. The project cost around MAD140 million. In the beginning, project manager Nasser Larguet toured the country to find adequate candidates. Afterwards, the academy started a testing system to accept students. The North-African Academy is managed by Compagnie Générale Immobilière, a non-profit organization. The academy is presided by the personal royal secretary of King Mohamed VI, Mounir El Majidi, who is also the head of FUS Rabat.

King Mohamed VI supported the project by presenting financial aids to encourage similar initiatives in other cities and to guarantee the progress of Football activities in the country.

In March 2010, King Mohammed VI inaugurated the academy which aims to provide education, mentoring and football training for its students. The academy opened its doors in September 2010. It is destined for around 50 candidates aged between 13 and 18 years old. This educational sports facility is financially supported by personal funding from the king. It has also received a part of private investments from ONA, Maroc Télécom, Addoha, Bank of Africa, CDG and AttijariWafa bank.

In 2015, similar academies were launched in several cities across Morocco, including Agadir, Tangier, and Saïdia.

== Structure ==
The academy is located near the Bouregreg river and it covers the area of 2.5 km^{2}. It is composed of two main areas: The open space (playing fields, and outdoor space for other activities) and a village.

The academy is built to be a modern facility that encloses Moroccan cultural heritage. It is arranged to follow the shape of a traditional douar, with a central village square surrounded by five buildings. Each building caters for a specific function (lodging, education, a medical facility and a canteen). Landscaped patios were designed to ensure the relaxation of the young footballers.

=== School ===
A school was constructed following the guidelines of a Sport-study curriculum. It offers a three-level programme for students with the first level being a preparatory stage to help them adjust. The school encompasses 10 classrooms, along with a language and a computer science classroom. The teaching programme provided by the academy is supported by the ministry of education.

=== Sports village ===
The Facility presents its students with four stadiums constructed under FIFA guidelines. A half synthetic football pitch, one training box drill, four locker rooms and a special training box drill for goalkeepers.

=== Medical centre ===
The medical centre is composed of a clinic, a physiotherapist office and a balneotherapy pool.

=== Tournaments ===
Every Year, The AMF organizes international football tournaments, which involves clubs from all over the world mainly Europe. The 5th edition was won by Génération Foot. The 6th edition was won by the Dutch team AFC Ajax, after defeating Danish team F.C. Copenhagen in the final. The 7th edition was won by River Plate. The 8th edition was won by Mohammed VI Academy.

== Academy graduates ==
=== Notable players ===
The following players trained at the academy and later became internationals or established themselves in top-level professional leagues:

- Abdel Abqar
- Nayef Aguerd
- Youssef En-Nesyri
- Ahmed Reda Tagnaouti
- Hamza Mendyl
- Azzedine Ounahi
- Yassir Zabiri
- Amin Zahzouh
- Oussama Targhalline

=== Honours by graduates ===
- In the 2022 FIFA World Cup, four academy-trained players were part of the Morocco squad that reached the semi-finals, becoming the first African nation to achieve this milestone.
- In October 2025, four players trained at the academy were among the starters for the Morocco under-20 team that won the 2025 FIFA U-20 World Cup in Chile.
- Players formed at the academy were included in the Morocco squad that won the 2025 FIFA Arab Cup in Qatar.
