= Hassan II Stadium =

Proposed football stadium in Morocco

- Grand Stade de Casablanca
- Planned design of the stadium
- Interactive map of Hassan II Stadium
- Address: Casablanca
- Location: El Mansouria commune, Benslimane Province, Casablanca-Settat
- Coordinates: 33.677078°N 7.275000°W
- Owner: Royal Moroccan Football Federation
- Operator: SONARGES
- Capacity: 115,000
- Surface: Grass

Construction
- Opened: 2028 (planned)
- Cost: MAD5 billion (US$500 million)
- Architects: Oualalou + Choi; Populous

Tenants
- Morocco national football team Raja CA; Wydad AC

Website
- stadehassan2.com

Hassan II Stadium (Arabic: ملعب الحسن الثاني) is an under construction football stadium being built in the commune of El Mansouria, Benslimane Province, Morocco, east of Casablanca. The stadium is named after Hassan II of Morocco. The stadium's design calls for a capacity of 115,000 spectators, which would make it the second largest football stadium in the world after VinFast Stadium.

The project was announced in October 2023 by Fouzi Lekjaa, budget minister, after Morocco was named host of the 2030 FIFA World Cup with Spain and Portugal. The stadium is proposed to have a large role in the tournament. It will also serve as the home venue for Raja CA, Wydad AC, and the Morocco national football team. The official cost of construction is 5.1 billion dirhams (USD $1.39 billion). The opening date is planned for 2029.

== History ==
=== Initial project ===
Over the years, there have been persistent rumors surrounding the construction of a new stadium and its anticipated completion timing. These speculations gained momentum, particularly after Stade Mohammed V suffered damages from multiple games of its tenants Raja CA and Wydad AC. These two teams have a significant stake in African interclub competitions and domestic tournaments.

The initial project was planned for the 2010 FIFA World Cup, for which Morocco lost their bid to South Africa by 4 votes with 14–10. It included five major stadiums across the country, including Ibn Batouta Stadium, the Marrakesh Stadium and two more in the major cities of Agadir and Fez. Years after, it was one of the 14 stadiums included in Morocco's bid for the 2026 FIFA World Cup, which included the construction of two new stadiums in Casablanca. However, on June 13, 2018, in Moscow, 203 FIFA member federations voted for the United bid of Canada, Mexico and the United States, with 134 votes against 65 for Morocco.

=== Construction ===
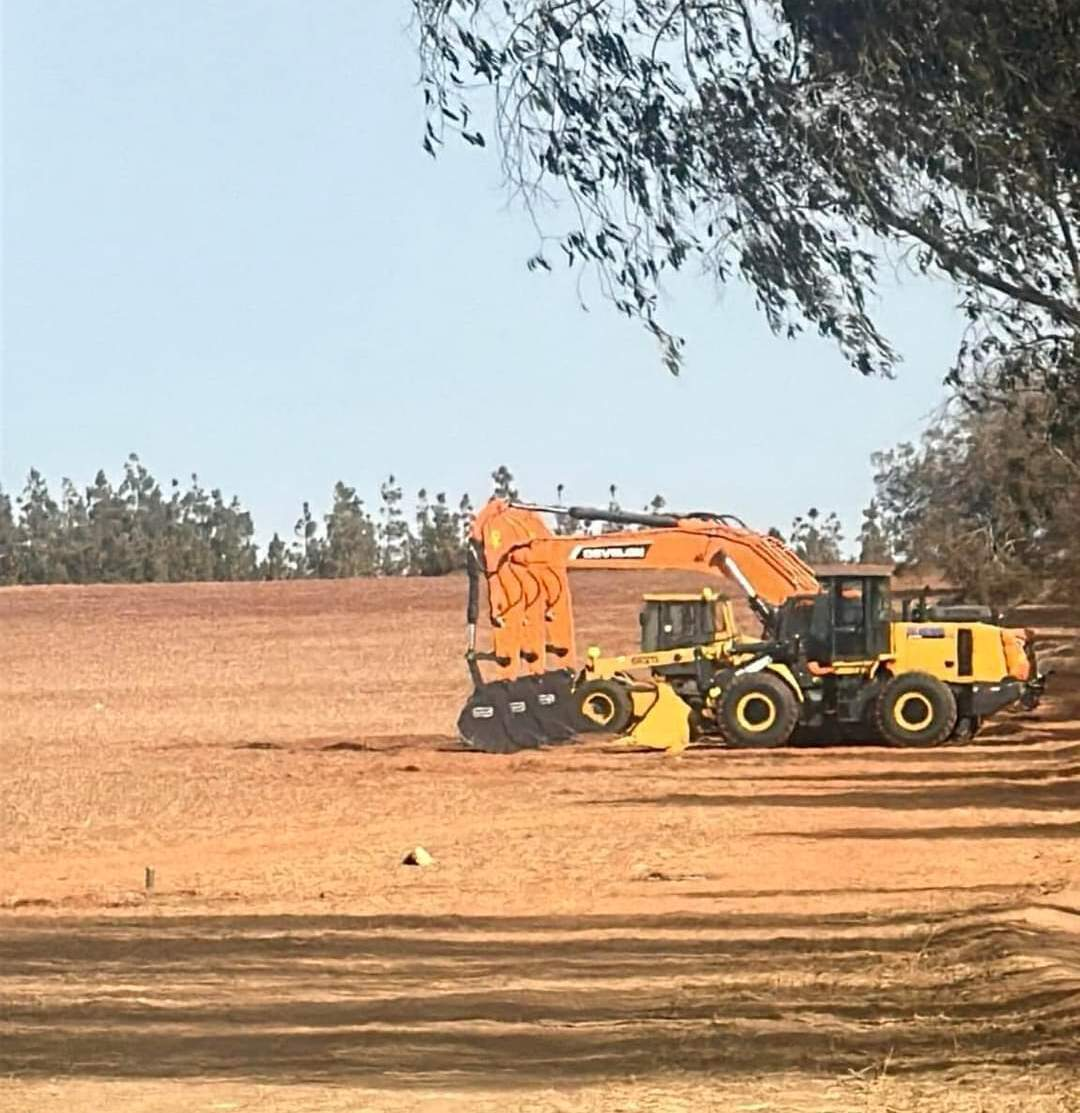
Early phases of construction, August 2024

The situation took a new turn after the historic qualification of the Morocco national football team for the semi-finals of the 2022 FIFA World Cup. This achievement prompted the Royal Moroccan Football Federation to take the lead in hosting major football events, such as the 2025 Africa Cup of Nations. Furthermore, a promising collaboration with Spain and Portugal has emerged as they jointly bid to host the 2030 FIFA World Cup. This progress has reignited discussions about the long-desired construction of the Grand Stade de Casablanca, initially proposed for the 2010 and 2026 World Cups. These developments were further confirmed by Fouzi Lekjaa, the President of the Royal Moroccan Football Federation, during a government meeting led by Prime Minister Aziz Akhannouch on 22 June 2023. Fouzi presented the comprehensive details of the joint bid for the 2030 FIFA World Cup, emphasizing the central role of the stadium's construction in the bid.

On 20 October 2023, the government and the Caisse de Dépôt et de Gestion signed an agreement that allocates approximately 5 billion dirhams to the stadium construction over the period 2025-2028. It also launched the renovation of the other stadiums to host the 2025 AFCON and the 2030 World Cup. 9.5 billion dirhams will be mobilized to conform six stadiums to CAF standards in the 2023 - 2025 period. A second update will be then operated over the period 2025 - 2028, in compliance with FIFA standards for a budget ranging from 4.5 to 6 billion dirhams.

On 28 October, during a press conference with his Spanish and Portuguese counterparts, Pedro Rocha and Fernando Gomes, the president of the FRMF Fouzi Lekjaa declared "The construction of the new Casablanca stadium will begin at the end of December and will take over two years", before specifying that the stadium will be made available to Raja CA and Wydad AC.

On 14 March 2024, a consortium led by local firm Tarik Oualalou Architecte (Oualalou + Choi) and Populous was selected during a design competition for the Grand Stade de Casablanca.

== Design ==
The stadium's design was unveiled in August 2024 by the firm Populous and Oualalou + Choi. It was inspired by the concept of the moussem, a traditional Moroccan and North African communal gathering held under large tents, as well as on the imagery of the tent and the garden. The architect Tarik Oualalou described the design as reflecting Morocco's topography and landscapes. The stadium's large roof, made of an aluminum lattice, is spread over the structure to evoke a monumental space inspired by Moroccan tents.
