= Benslimane =

Benslimane بنسليمان ⴱⵏⵙⵍⵉⵎⴰⵏ
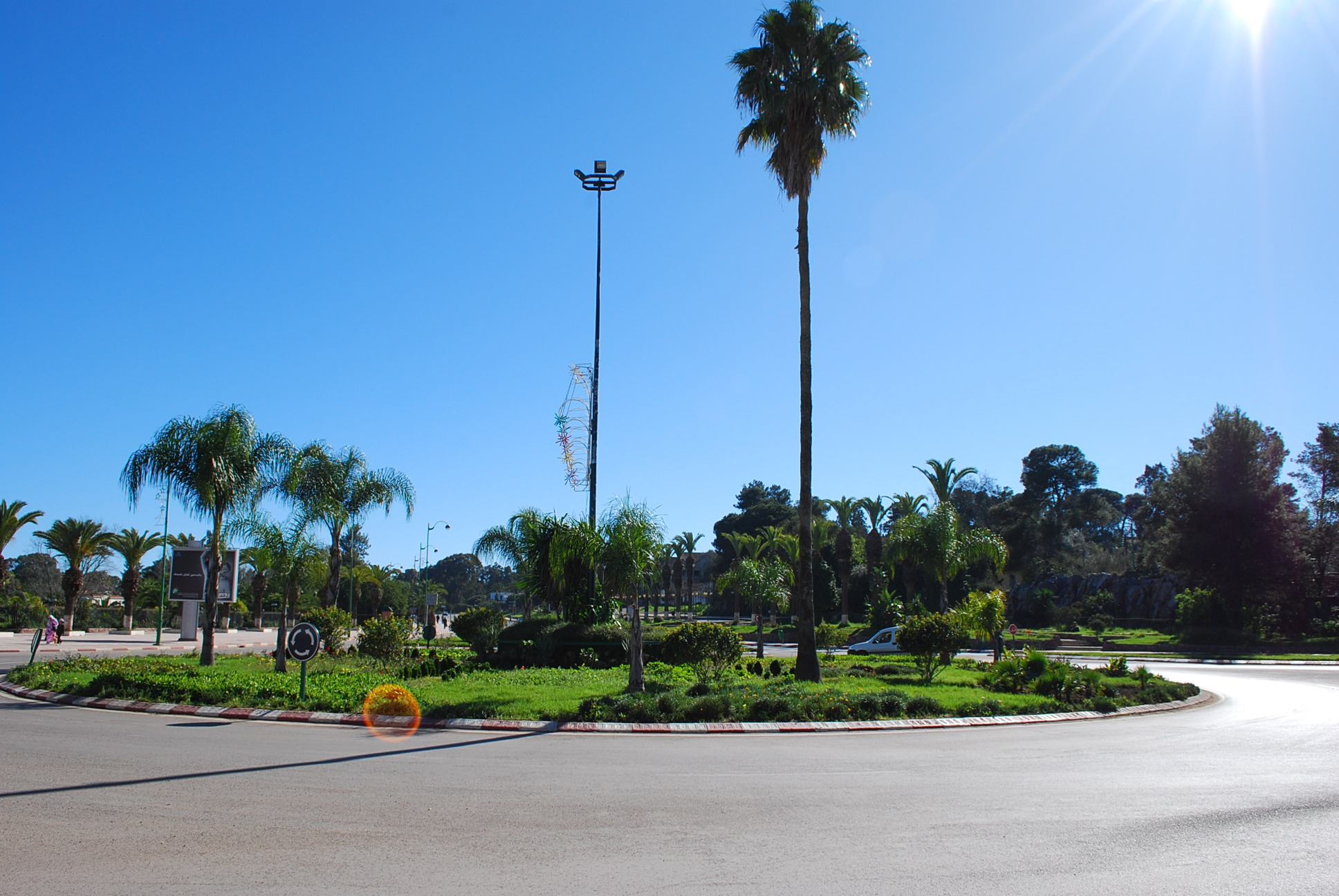
- Interactive map of Benslimane
- Coordinates: 33°37′N 7°7′W
- Country: Morocco
- Region: Casablanca-Settat
- Province: Benslimane
- Elevation: 233 m (764 ft)

Population (2024)
  - Total: 67,317
- Time zone: UTC+0 (GMT)

Benslimane (Arabic: بنسليمان; Standard Moroccan Tamazight: ⴱⵏⵙⵍⵉⵎⴰⵏ) is a Moroccan city and the capital of Benslimane Province, Casablanca-Settat.

== History ==
The city was founded by the French in 1907 during the campaign of Morocco, the military establishment was followed by the construction of a residential area for military that developed along the path to Bouznika.

Located 60 km from Casablanca, the town is known for its dry climate and for hunting wild boar.

The Hassan II Stadium is expected to be built in time for the 2030 FIFA World Cup when Morocco co-hosts alongside Portugal and Spain.

== Neighbourhoods ==
The city is divided into several areas such as: Bel Air District, Al Qods District, The Oaks District, Gardens District as well as other administrative and industrial areas.
