= El-Ahmar ben Mansour =

El-Ahmar ben Mansour الأحمر بن منصور
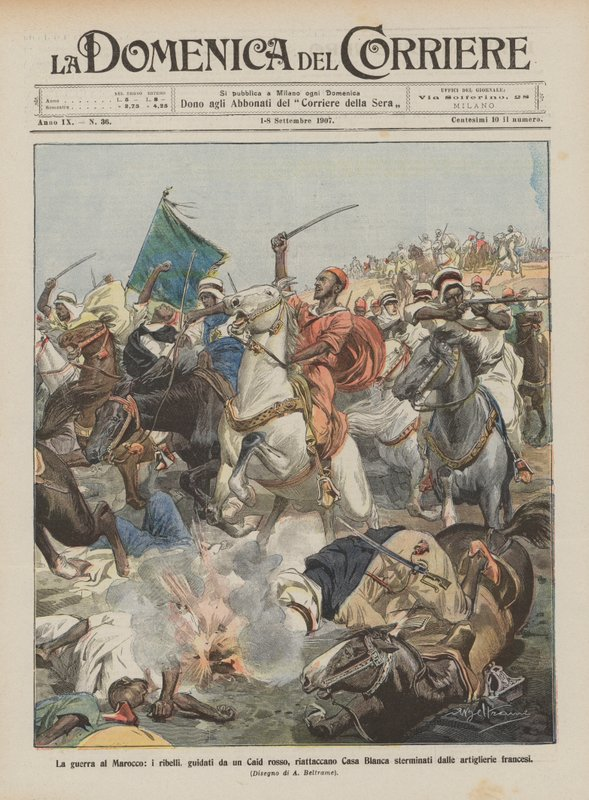
- Depiction of El-Ahmar attacking Casablanca

Caïd of Mdakra tribe

Personal details
- Born: El-Ahmar ben Mansour (al-Ahlafi al-Mdakouri); 1864 Casablanca
- Died: October 1928 (aged 63–64) Nazal al-Ahmar, Morocco
- Cause of death: Killed in battle
- Spouse(s): al-Fassiya al-Hayyaniya al-Kurda; Khadija bent al-Meknessi
- Children: Hammou el-Shergi ben el-Ahmar; Hassan ben el-Ahmar; Jilali ben el-Ahmar
- Occupation: Mujahid
- Nickname(s): "The Red Sultan" "The Red Caïd" "The Muezzin of Jihad"

El-Ahmar ben Mansour (Arabic: الأحمر بن منصور, romanized: al-Aḥmar ibn Manṣūr; (Note: Also spelled Lahmar ben Mançour) 1870 – October 1928) was a Moroccan anti-colonial leader who took part in the battles of the Chaouia campaign.

== Biography ==
=== Early life ===
El-Ahmar belonged to a powerful family from Chaouia. He was born in 1870 in the territory of the Ahlaf tribe of the Mdakra, which is a branch of the Banu Maqil. His family was one of the most influential within this tribe. His father, al-Hajj Mansour, named him El Ahmar ben Mansour (literally "the Red son of the Victorious") due to his relatively dark, "reddish" skin complexion. His lineage traces back to Mohammed al-Ahmar ben Mansour ben al-Hajj Bashir.

=== Military leadership against France ===
The Mdakra took part in all the resistance efforts against the French in the Chaouia region. As their caïd, El-Ahmar launched an anti-French movement in 1907 alongside several other leaders. The Mdakra contingents were divided into four groups based on their sub-tribes: the Ahlaf, the Ouled Ali, the Ouled Sebbah, and the Melilla, with El-Ahmar ben Mansour being the most influential leader among them. El-Ahmar and his troops aligned themselves with the forces of Moulay Abd al-Hafidh. Among his allies was caïd Msouber az-Zemrani from the Zemrane tribe, who strongly called for jihad, preaching that dying for this cause led to paradise. The French attempted to win El-Ahmar over to their side by offering him prestigious titles, but he systematically refused, stating that he was fighting against the subjugation of his compatriots by France.

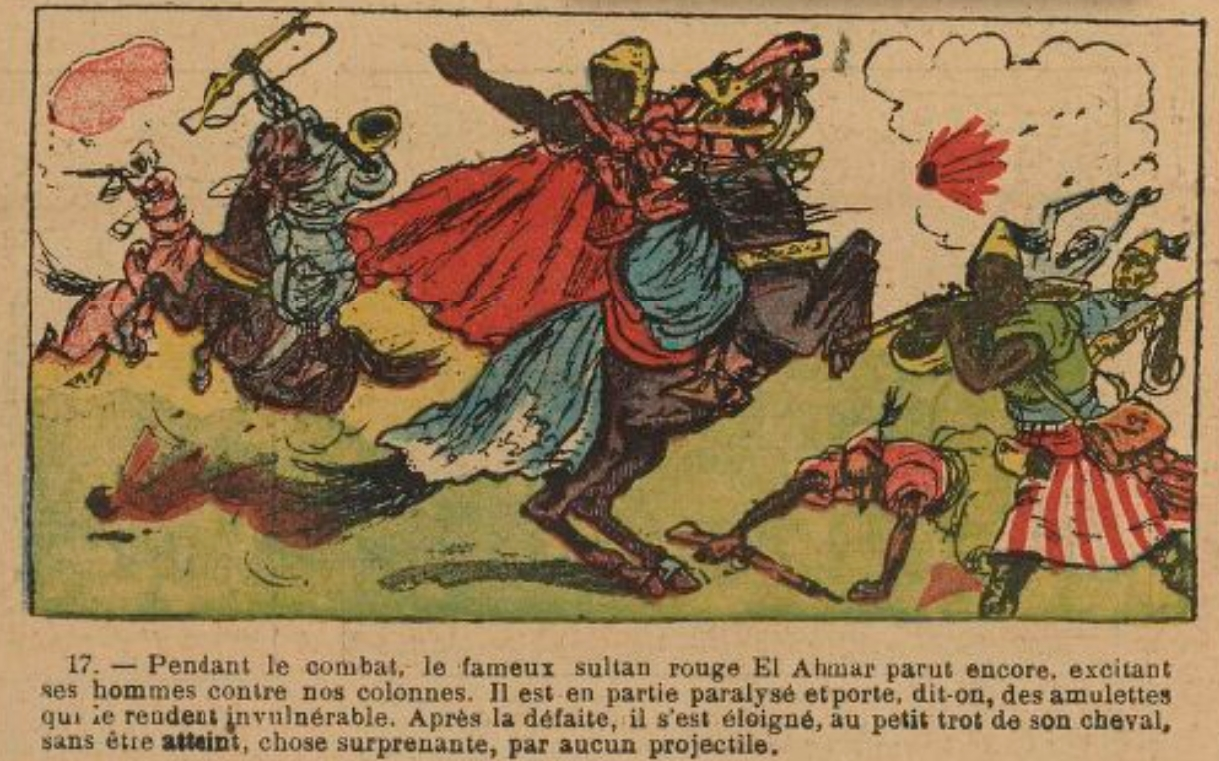
Comic strip depicting El-Ahmar ben Mansur in 1907 in the Gazette Vosgienne

El-Ahmar took part in several battles, including the First Battle of Settat, the fighting on 11 September 1907 against General Drude—which marked one of El-Ahmar's earliest documented appearances—and the victory of the Chaouia tribes at the Battle of Fakhakha (1908). Following numerous engagements, the French and Abd al-Hafidh sought to end the bloodshed and decided to send several jihadist leaders back to Fez. Upon learning about the signing of the Treaty of Fez in 1912 and the establishment of the French protectorate, El-Ahmar left Fez to join resistance movements in the Middle Atlas. There, he supported Mouha ou Hammou Zayani and the Zayanes in the Zaian War. After sustaining numerous wounds, he left the battlefield to resume religious studies. Historical accounts also mention a time when he asked Abd el-Krim for permission to settle in the Rif, where he subsequently participated in the Battle of Annual.

=== Death ===
After a relentless life of warfare against France, the "Red Sultan" eventually settled in Nazalat al-Ahmar, dedicating his final years to protecting local inhabitants from French colonial incursions. In 1928, he died after being shot more than seven times.

== Family and descendants ==
El-Ahmar reportedly married more than 17 women throughout his life. Among them were al-Fassiya al-Hayaniyah, from the Hyayna tribe; al-Kurda, his cousin; and Khadija bent al-Meknessi.

=== Descendants ===
==== With al-Kurda ====
- Al-Hassan ben El-Ahmar
- Jilali ben al-Ahmar
  - Mekkawi (b. Jilali)
    - Abd al-Latif
    - Abd al-Hadi
    - Ibrahim
