= Mohammedia =

Mohammedia المحمدية
- City
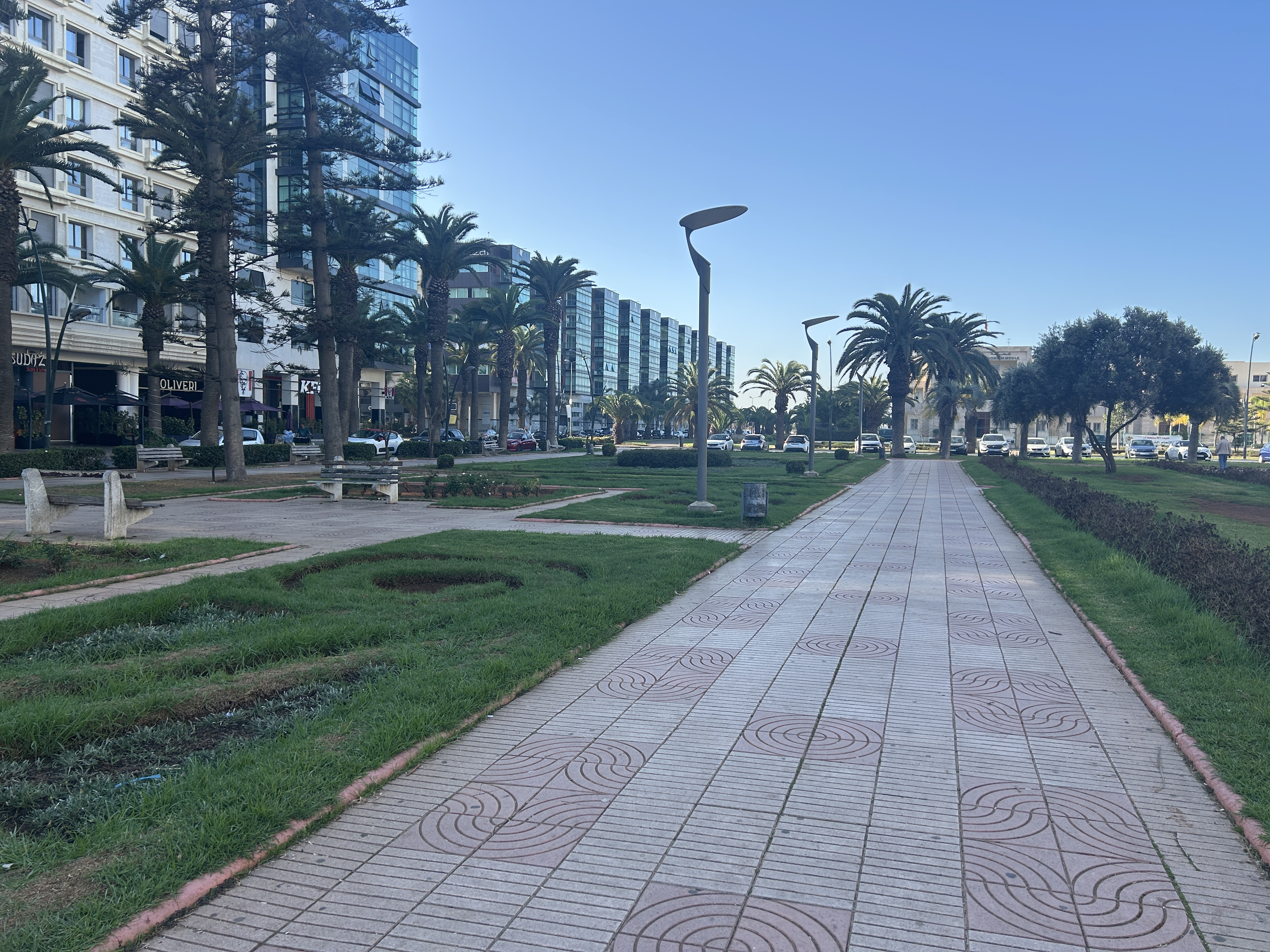
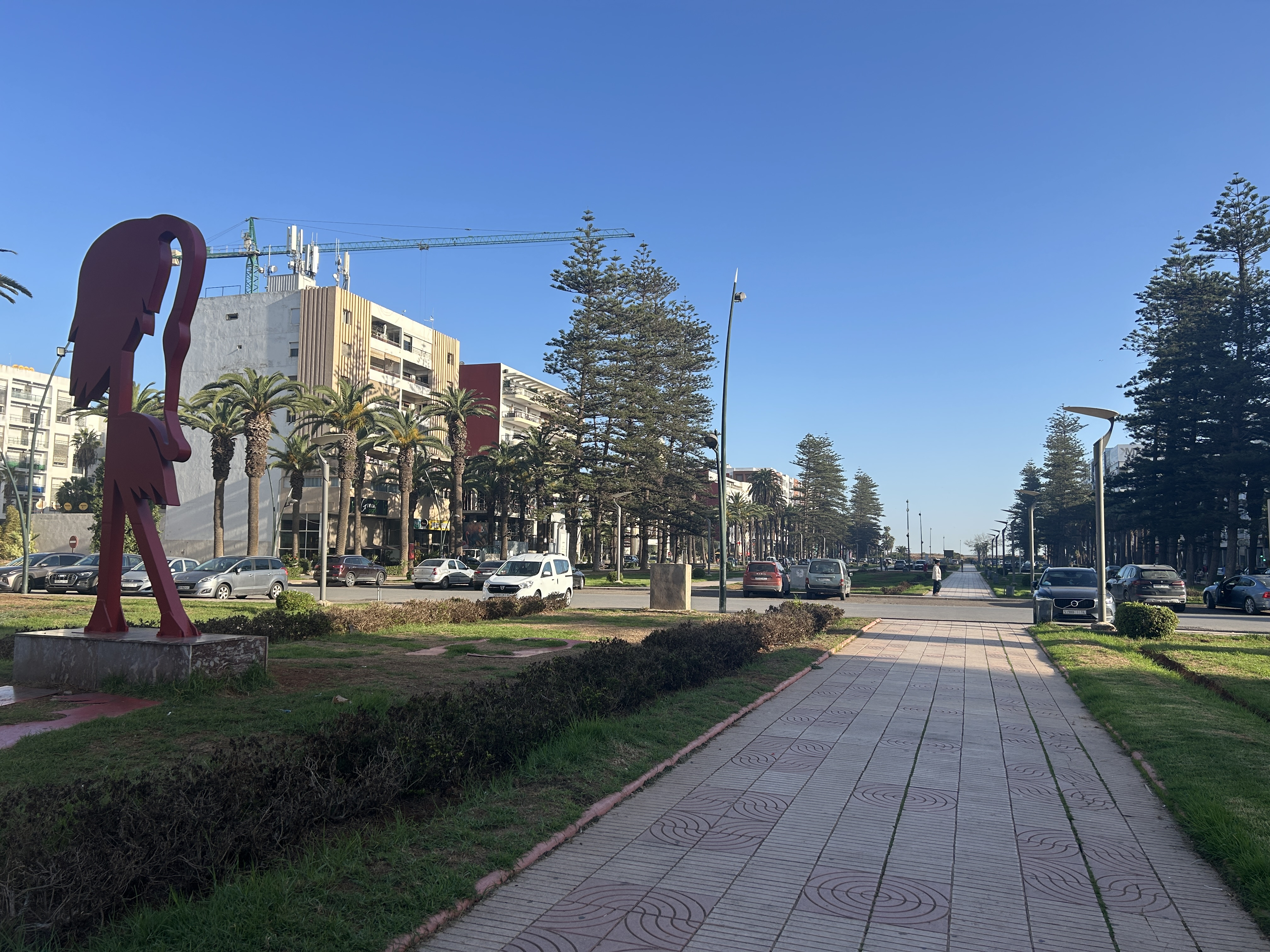
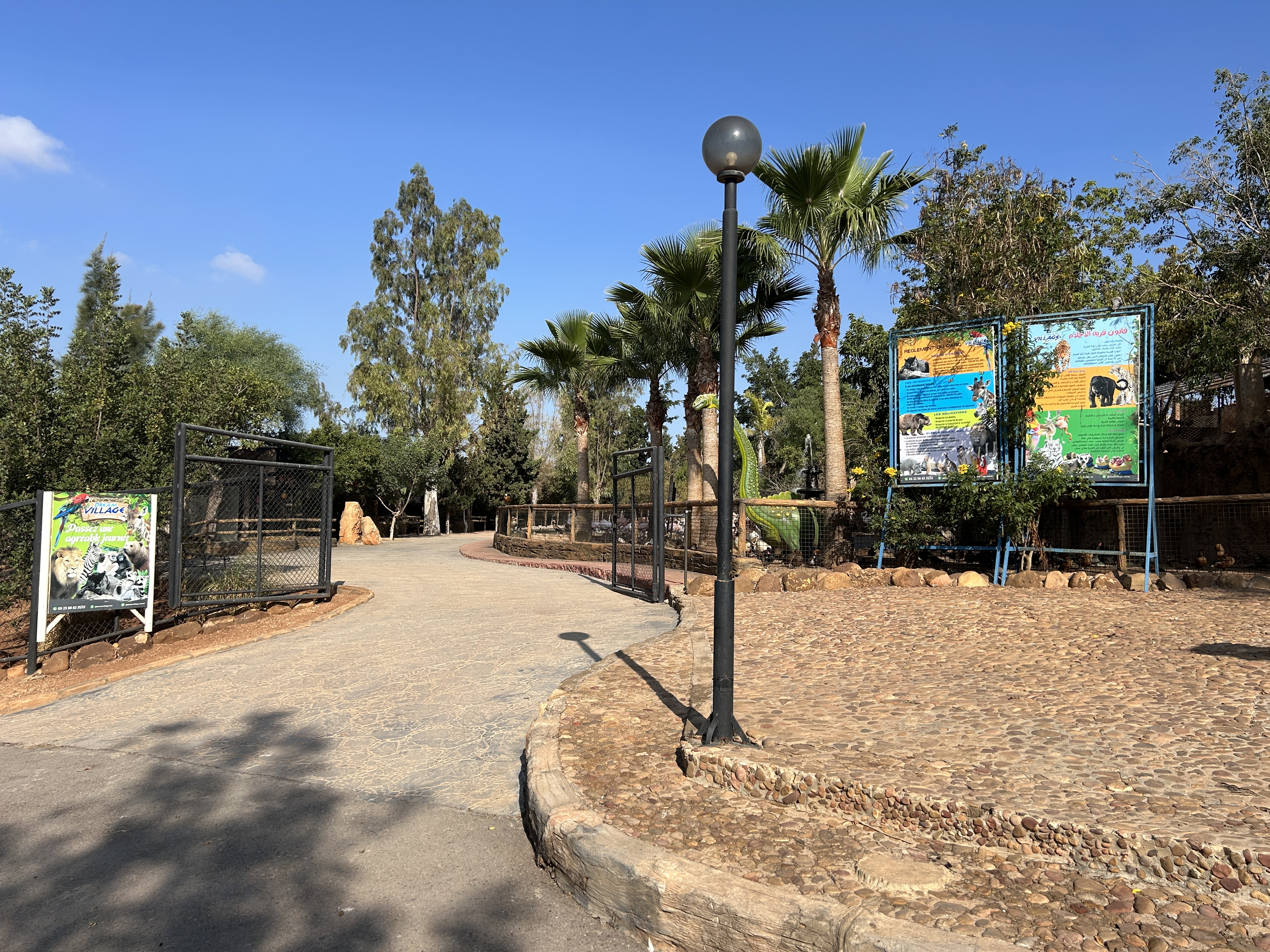
- Interactive map of Mohammedia
- Coordinates: 33°41′N 7°23′W
- Country: Morocco
- Region: Casablanca-Settat
- Prefecture: Mohammedia Prefecture

Government
  - Mayor: Hicham Aït Manna (RNI)

Population (2024)
  - Total: 194,358 (Commune); 514,057 (Prefecture)
- Time zone: UTC+0 (GMT)

Mohammedia (Arabic: المحمدية, romanized: al-Muḥammadiyya), known until 1960 as Fedala (Arabic: فضالة, romanized: Faḍāla), is a major port city on the west coast of Morocco between Casablanca and Rabat in the region of Casablanca-Settat.

The prefecture has a population of 514,057 while the city has a population of 194,358 as of the 2024 census.

The city hosts three large industrial zones covering an area of about 800 hectares. It used to host the most important oil refinery of Morocco, the Samir Refinery, which made it the center of the Moroccan petroleum industry until its closure in 2015.

== History ==
=== Early history ===
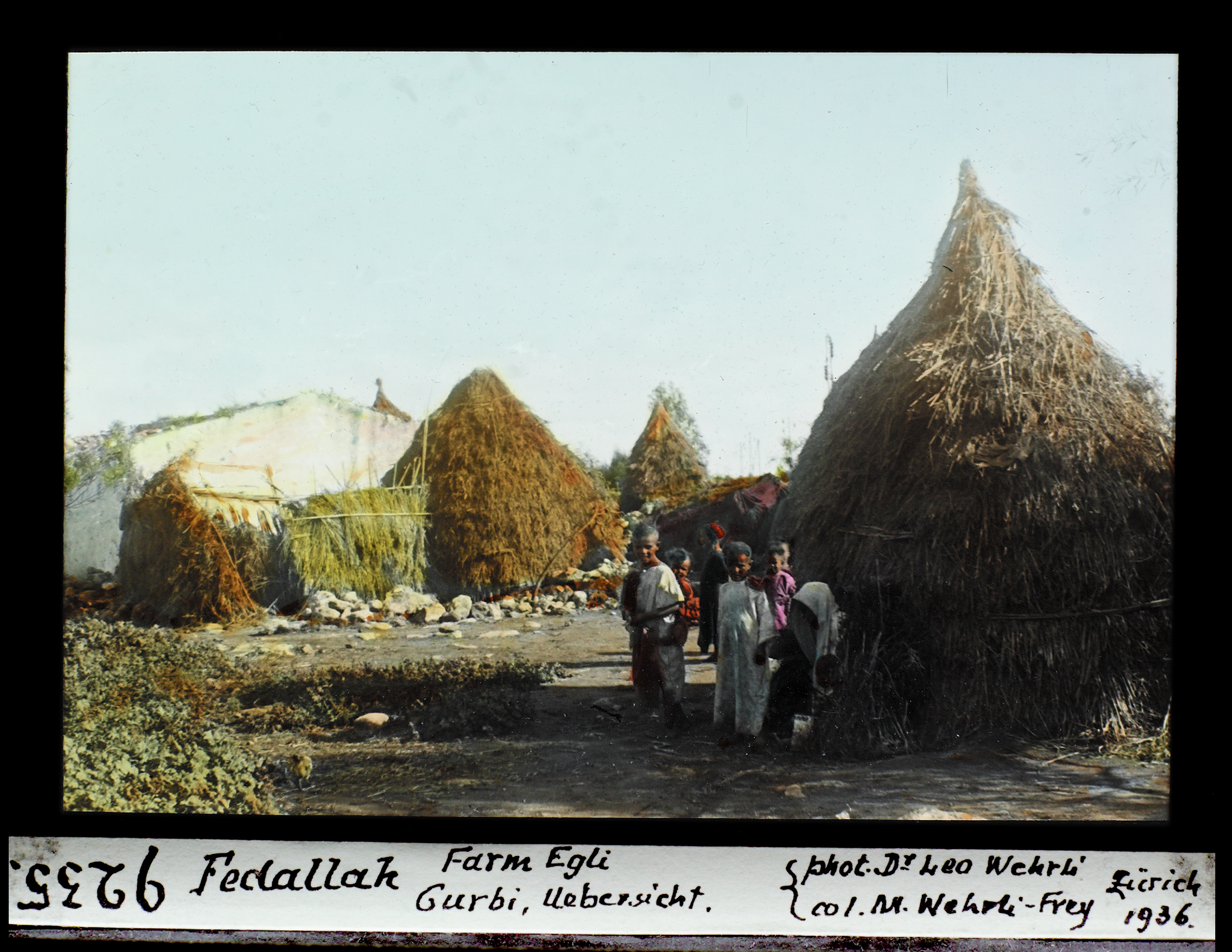
A farm in Fedallah in 1936.

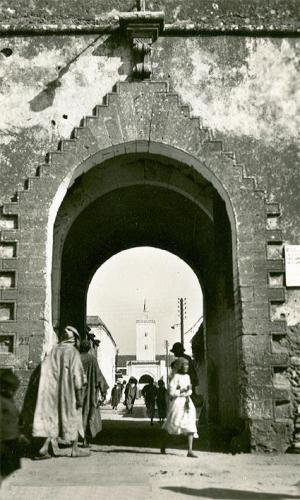
The entry of the Kasbah and the Al Atik Mosque in the background

The harbor, which is now Mohammedia, was originally named Fedala (فضالة). The name comes from the Arabic words Fadl Allah (فضل الله) which means "favor of God". According to Graberg de Hemsö, it comes from Fayḍ Allāh, meaning "bounty of God". Traces still exist of its business role under the Almoravid dynasty. It was frequented in the 14th and 15th centuries by merchant ships from Europe seeking cereals and dried fruits.

In 1773, the Sultan Sidi Mohammed ben Abdallah made of Fédala a grains warehouse of Tamasna province and built the Kasbah to protect the shops for traders. He built the white mosque Al Atik as well.

=== French Protectorate ===
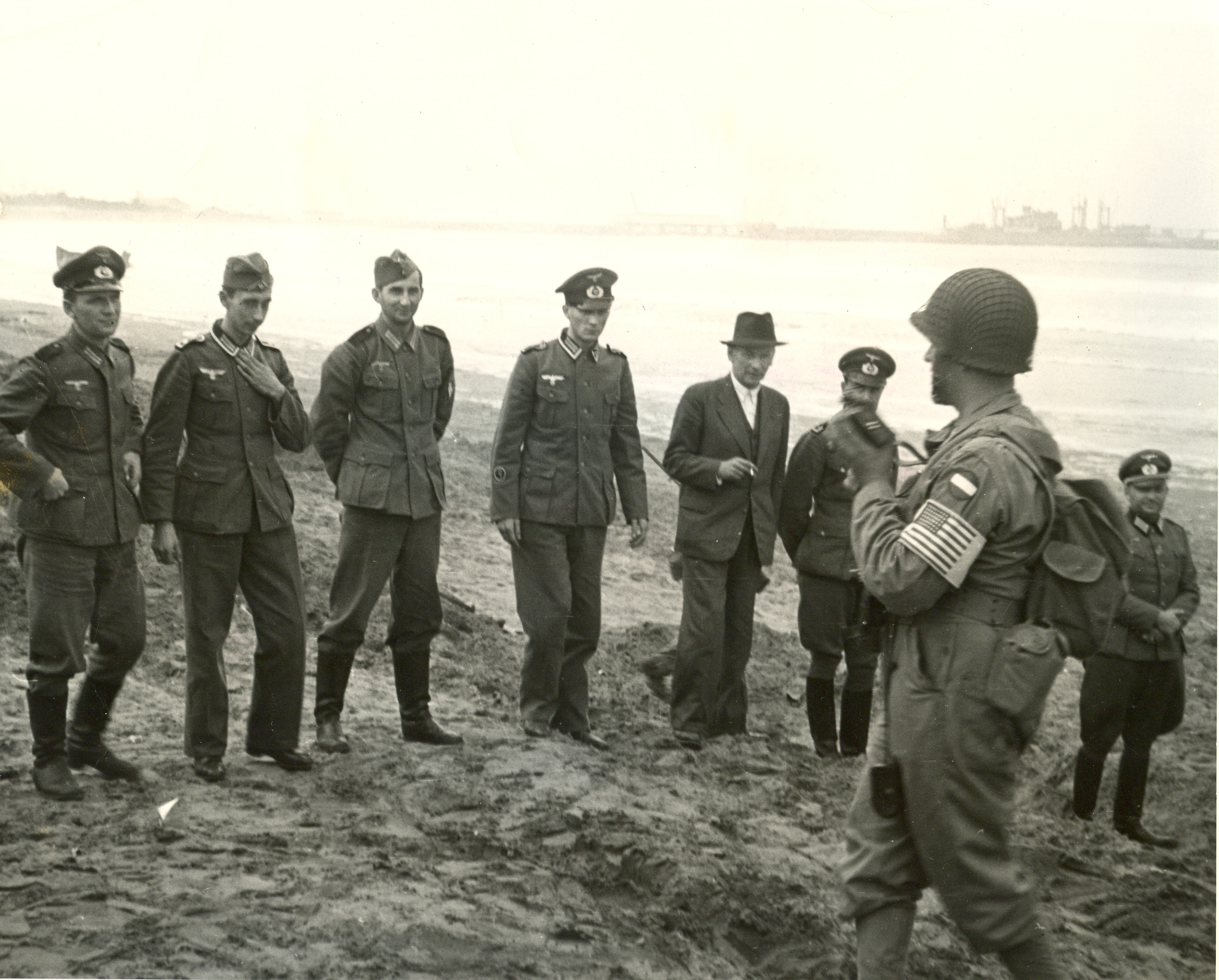
German officers captured at Fedala, 1943

During the precolonial period, competition between the Western powers to ensure the economical exploitation of Africa was behind the merger of Europeans interests in the ports of Morocco. In the region of Fédala, the German family Mannesmann acquired a large area of land.

The Treaty of November 4, 1911 between France and Germany on the partition of Africa forced the Mannesmann family to abandon the lands they held for Georges and Jacques Hersent, two French industrialists, who noticed the existence of a natural bay, valuable for the creation of a large port at low cost.

The group Hersent created the Franco-Moroccan company in 1912 and founded the port company in 1914 that took a leading part in the development of Fédala. The rapid growth of the city started around the port, which allowed the development of various industries such as canning fishery products, agro-industry plants, tannery, textile, etc..

The seaside town took shape in 1925 and the Esplanade was built in 1938. The construction of the sea line in 1951 made of Fédala the first and most modern oil port in North Africa.

The church of Saint James (Saint Jacques), which overlooks the main square, was erected in 1934 by Jean and Georges Hersent, in memory of their son and nephew Jacques (3 February 1893 - 26 July 1917), who died at the Marne during the First World War.

==== Battle of Fedala ====
US Army invaded Fédala from the Atlantic on November 8, 1942, as part of Operation Torch. The invasion was carried out by the Center Attack Group of the Western Task Force which landed on the Atlantic coast of Morocco. The landing began at 4 AM.

=== New city ===
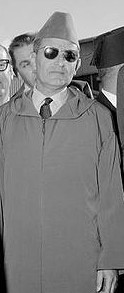
In 1960, the city was renamed after the reigning King of Morocco, Mohammed V

Fédala was renamed Mohammedia on 25 June 1960 in honor of King Mohammed V, the restorer of Moroccan independence, on the occasion of laying the foundation stone of the Samir oil refinery. The new name indicates the modern character of this city. Today, the city serves as both a seaside resort and a manufacturing center.

Mohammedia is also a resort city containing a golf, tennis club and many other recreational activities. In addition, people call it madinat lwurud wa riyada which means "city of flowers and sports".

Within the past decade, Mohammedia's beaches "Sablet & Mimosa" have drawn many people from Casablanca and its nearby cities. Sablet and Mimosa have been under development, building new beach condos and villas as well as investing in small businesses. Summer sees a population increase from tourists, in part due to the range of outdoor activities including basketball, soccer, surfing, and fishing. The night life includes several cafes, restaurants, clubs, and a boardwalk. There are several other projects going on in the city of Mohammedia as well as infrastructure throughout the city.

On 22 December 2022, a huge explosion erupted after a gas storage facility went up in flames. Authorities claimed to have no casualties. Families and citizens living near the facility have evacuated the surroundings. After 2 hours of the incident, local authorities contained the fires caused by the explosion.

== Geography ==
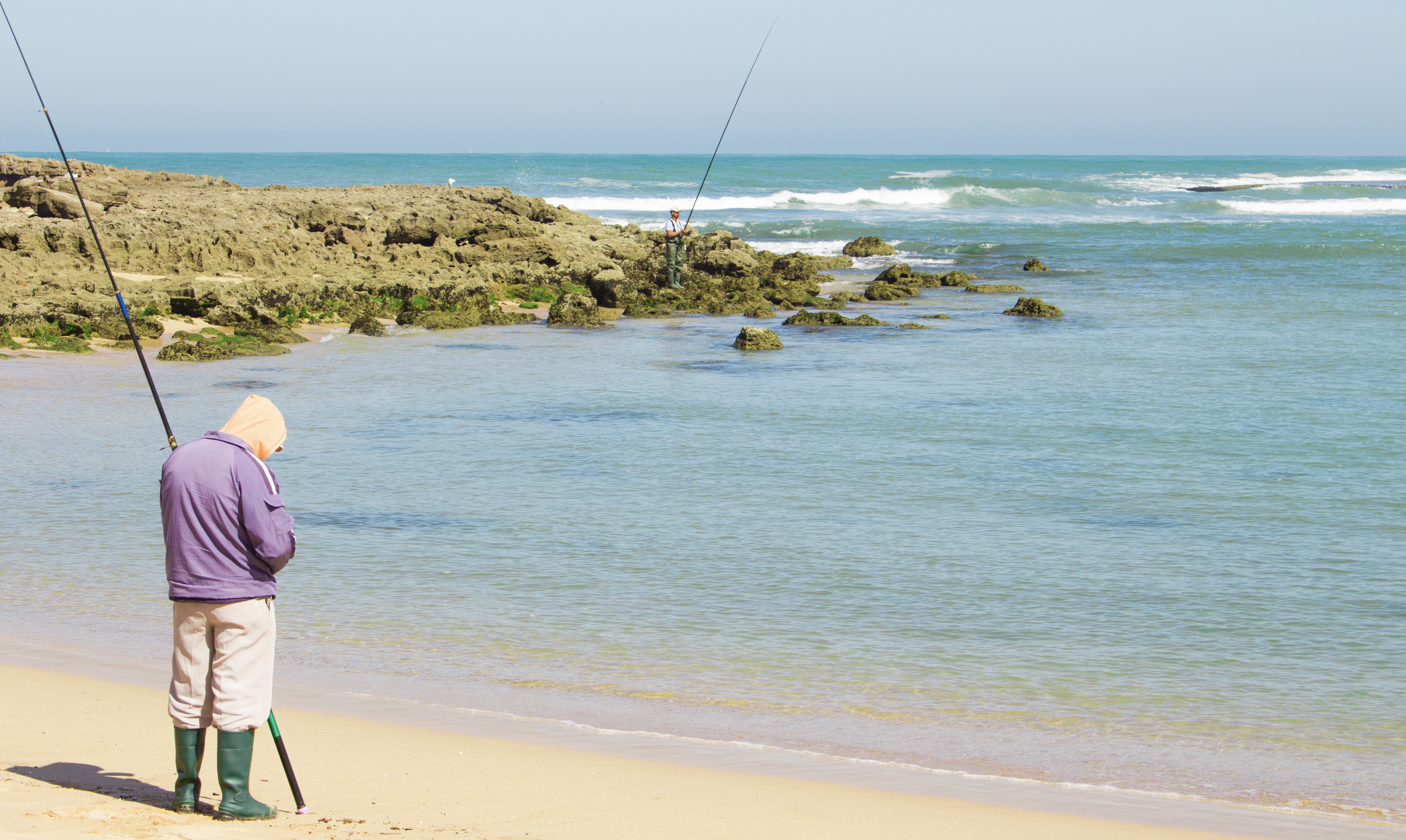
men fishing at Manesmane Beach

=== Location ===
Mohammedia lies along the Atlantic Ocean 24 kilometres (15 miles) Northeast of Casablanca. It is located between the outlets of the Rivers Oued El-Maleh and Oued Nfifikh and is bordered by the Atlantic Ocean to the North, Ben Slimane Province to the East and South, and the prefecture of Sidi Bernoussi-Zenata to the West.

=== Climate ===
Mohammedia has a hot-summer Mediterranean climate (Köppen climate classification Csa). The moderating effect of the Atlantic Ocean influences strongly on the city climate and makes its winter soft and warm, and its summer hot and cool. Mohammedia enjoys plenty of sunshine throughout the year with measurable precipitation annually.

The period of November through April is mild and rainy with average high temperatures of 17 to 21 °C (63 to 70 °F) and lows of 8 to 12 °C (46 to 53 °F), however temperatures can occasionally drop to around 2 °C (36 °F) in the morning, or be as high as 24 °C (75 °F) for a few days during winter.

The period of May through October is warm to hot and dry with average high temperatures of 22 to 26 °C (72 to 79 °F) and lows of 15 to 20 °C (59 to 68 °F), but temperatures can exceed 32 °C (90 °F) and occasionally reach 40 °C (104 °F).

Most rainfall occurs from November to April, and the average annual precipitation is around 432 mm. Precipitation is most commonly in the form of light rain showers, but sometimes there is heavy rainfall and thunderstorms.

Climate data for Mohammedia
Month	Jan	Feb	Mar	Apr	May	Jun	Jul	Aug	Sep	Oct	Nov	Dec	Year
Mean daily maximum °C (°F)	17 (63)	18 (64)	19 (66)	20 (68)	22 (72)	24 (75)	26 (79)	26 (79)	26 (79)	24 (75)	21 (70)	18 (64)	22 (71)
Mean daily minimum °C (°F)	8 (46)	9 (48)	11 (52)	12 (54)	15 (59)	18 (64)	20 (68)	20 (68)	19 (66)	16 (61)	13 (55)	10 (50)	14 (58)
Average precipitation mm (inches)	64 (2.5)	59 (2.3)	52 (2.0)	43 (1.7)	20 (0.8)	6 (0.2)	1 (0.0)	1 (0.0)	4 (0.2)	30 (1.2)	77 (3.0)	75 (3.0)	432 (16.9)
Source: msn Weather

== Subdivisions ==
The province is divided administratively into the following:

Name	Geographic code	Type	Households	Population (2004)	Foreign population	Moroccan population	Notes
Mohammedia	371.01.01.	Municipality	39154	188619	1240	187379	
Aïn Harrouda	371.01.03.	Municipality	8417	41853	56	41797	
Bni Yakhlef	371.03.01.	Rural commune	5975	29723	10	29713	11490 residents live in the center, called Ben Yakhlef; 18233 residents live in rural areas.
Ech-Challalate	371.03.03.	Rural commune	7970	40311	21	40290	
Sidi Moussa Ben Ali	371.03.05.	Rural commune	1666	9368	1	9367	
Sidi Moussa Majdoub	371.03.07.	Rural commune	2502	12412	8	12404	

== Demographics ==
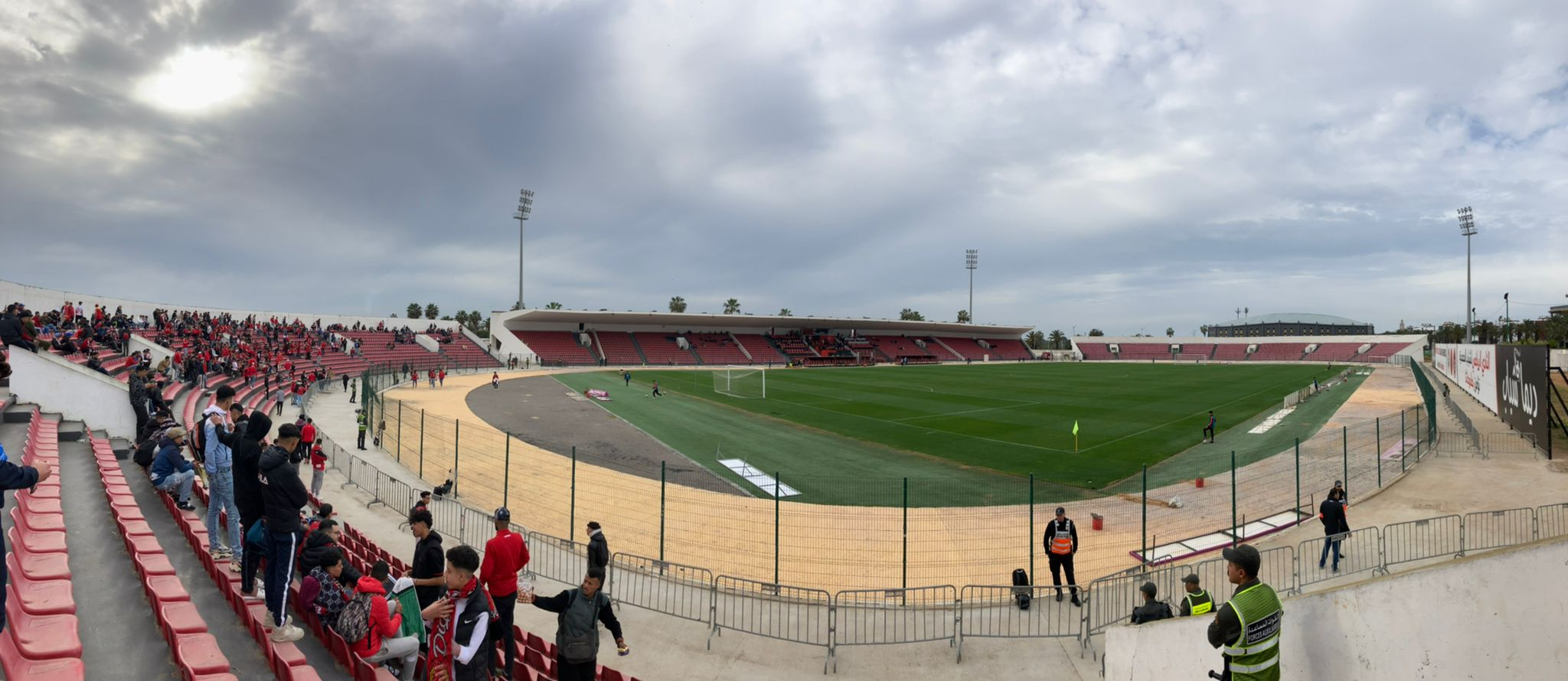
El Bachir stadium

The population of Mohammedia is growing at a fast rate. The city, which had a population of only 500 people in 1914, is currently home to about 204,000 people. The population of the prefecture of Mohammedia is estimated at 336,000 inhabitants with an average population density of 5,000 inhabitants per square kilometre (13,000/sq mi). All population groups of the Moroccan Kingdom are represented in this region. The first inhabitants of the city were the Zenata tribes, of which only few remain, divided territorially between Mohammedia and neighboring prefectures. Another Arab tribe of Mauritania, called Mjedba, settled between Fédala and Mediouna three centuries ago and are now twice as many as Zenata.

Demographic evolution
1994	2004	2010	2014	2024
170,063	188,619	203,748	208.612	194,358 (Urban)
1994, 2004: official census; 2010: 2014, 2024

Sources: --

== Education ==
Since the early 1980s, the city of Mohammedia has attracted university institutions. It has three colleges and two higher institutes, enrolling approximately 25,000 students:

1. College of Arts and Humanities
2. Faculty of Legal, Economic and Social Sciences
3. Faculty of Sciences and Technology of Mohammedia (FSTM)
4. National Higher School of Technical Education (ENSET)
5. Higher Institute of Applied Technology for Tourism and Hotels (ISTAH)

There are also other educational institutions in Mohammedia:

1. Higher Institute of Applied Technology Lacollines (ISTA)
2. Higher Industrial Institute of Mohammedia (ISIM)
3. Yasmina Vocational Rehabilitation Center (CQP)
4. Port Training Centre (CFA)

The city has also a French international school, Groupe Scolaire Claude Monet, serving moyenne section through collège (junior high school).

== Municipality ==
Mohammedia, whose size has increased significantly during the second half of the 20th century, is becoming one of the biggest cities in Morocco. New neighborhoods are built in all the parts of the city and more people live in town.

The city is divided into 2 major distinct areas, the Kasbah area, the Al-Alia district.

=== Kasbah area ===
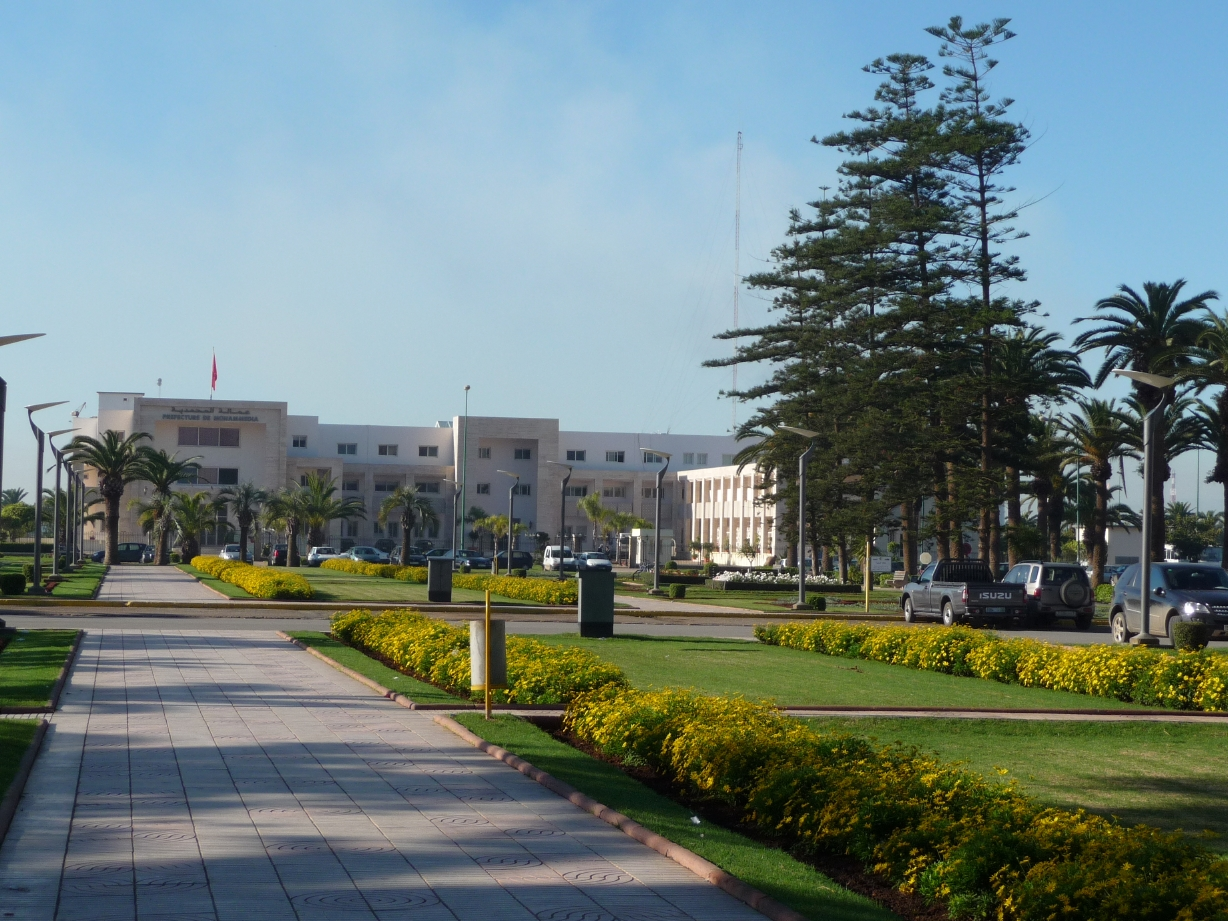
The prefecture of Mohammedia

This area where stands the Kasbah extends from Souss Street to the Al-Wafaa subdivision. It represents the historical heart of the city and has marked a transitional compromise between an urbanism of modern buildings and monuments, and the forms of ancient old Medina. Many commercials and services exist along the narrow streets of the Kasbah and the boulevards of the surrounding area, such as clothing merchants, wool merchants and fruit sellers. This area, which represents the city center, hosts many administrations, mosques, restaurants, hotels and parks as well.

- Subdivisions: The Kasbah, Al-Wafaa, Al-Marsa, Dyour Al-Qraii.
- Famous places: Twin Towns Park, Mohamed V boulevard, the Corniche.
- Infrastructures and mobility: The railway station, Moulay Abdellah Hospital, the Prefecture, Bachir Stadium.

=== Al-Alia ===
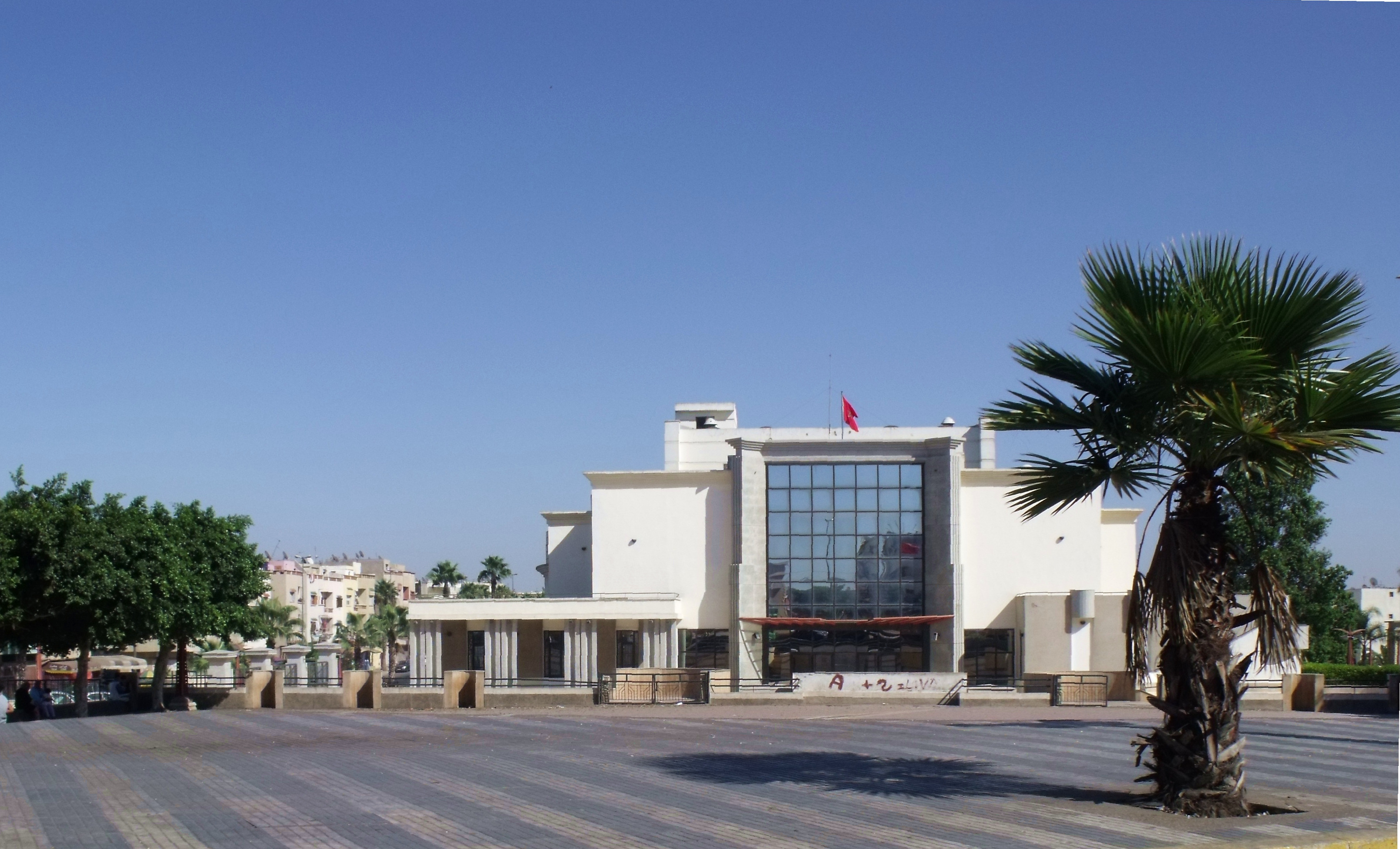
The municipal theater of Mohammedia

This district is located southern in the city on a gentle hill slope, which gives it the name Al-Alia that means the upper side. It was built in 1948 as a solution to the shantytowns problem, where rural population were living, attracted by the industrial development of the city and looking for a job.

Today, the district equals a small city in continuous expansion, equipped by all necessary facilities.

- Ancient subdivisions: El Hassania, Derb Marrakech, Diour Doukkala, Derb Jamila, Derb Ourida, Derb Fath, Derb Douchmane, Riyad Salam, Derb Laâyoune, Hay Al-Houria.
- New subdivisions: Hay El-Falah, Anfa, Rachidia, Hay Reda, Hay Nasr, Hay el-Fajr, La Colline, Hay Al-Wahda.
- Infrastructures and mobility: The Municipal Theater, the Coach Station.

== Economics and transport ==
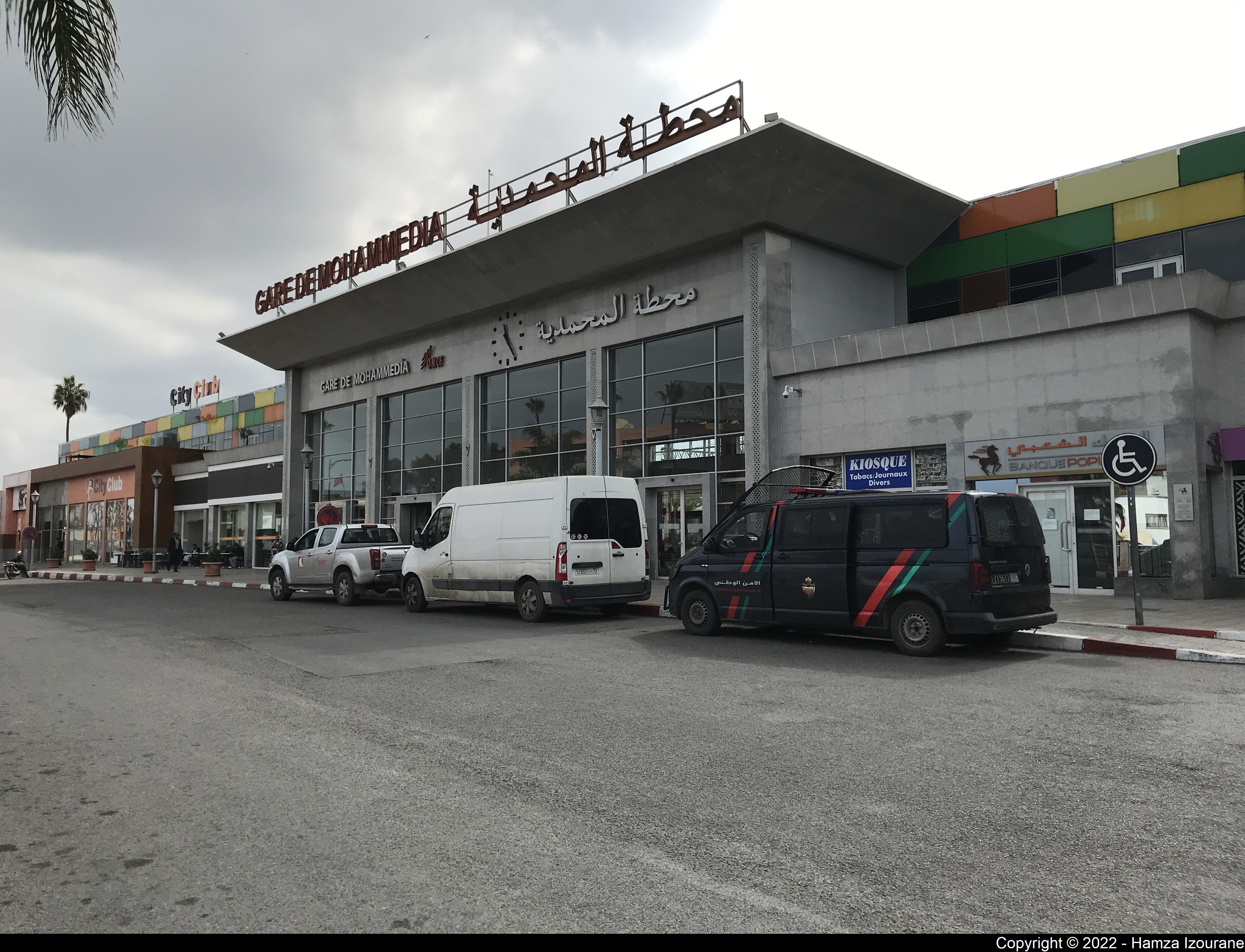
Mohammedia train station

=== Port ===
The port of Mohammedia specialises in liquid bulk and petro-chemicals. Mohammedia imports crude oil and it gets refined upon arrival. The port exports fish, chlorine, and sodium carbonate from large factories within the city.

== Notable people ==
- Abderrahim Achchakir, International footballer
- Abraham Serfaty, Moroccan political activist.
- Eric Besson, French politician.
- Ahmed Faras, Former international Moroccan football footballer.
- Noureddine Ziyati, Moroccan footballer.
- Tarik El Jarmouni, Moroccan football goalkeeper.
- Salaheddine Chihab, Moroccan football goalkeeper.
- Reda El Amrani, Moroccan tennis player.
- Jannat Mahid, Moroccan singer.
- Mohamed Al Hachdadi, international volleyball player.
- Marwane Saâdane, Moroccan footballer.
- Abdelatif Noussir, Moroccan footballer
- Noureddine Kacemi, Former international footballer
- Hassan Amcharrat, Former international footballer.
- Tarik El Jarmouni, Former international goalkeeper.
- Tarik Tnibar, footballer.
- Rachid Rokki, Former international footballer.

== International Relations ==
=== Twin towns - Sister cities ===
Mohammedia is twinned with:

(Belgium); Ghent, Belgium since 1982: (Libya); Zawiya, Libya since 2006: (France); Perpignan, France since 2009: (France); Belfort, France since 2010	(France); Dreux, France since 2010: (Russia); Noginsk, Russia since 2010: (China); Jiangyin, China since 2011
