= Ziaida =

Coordinates: 33°29′N 7°06′W

- Town
- Interactive map of Ziaida
- Country: Morocco
- Region: Casablanca-Settat
- Province: Benslimane

Population (2014)
  - Total: 14,581
- Time zone: UTC+0 (GMT)

Ziaida is a town and rural commune in Ben Slimane Province, Casablanca-Settat, Morocco. According to the 2014 census it had a population of 12,389.

It is also a tribe arab yéménite .
