= Moualine el Ghaba =

- Town
- Interactive map of Moualine el Ghaba
- Coordinates: 33.623°N 7.177°W
- Country: Morocco
- Region: Casablanca-Settat
- Province: Benslimane

Population (2004)
  - Total: 8,185
- Time zone: UTC+0 (GMT)

Moualine el Ghaba is a town in Benslimane Province, Casablanca-Settat, Morocco. According to the 2004 census it had a population of 8,185.

the commune has been merged and is now defunct.
