= Moualine el Oued =

Moualine el Oued موالين الواد
- Town
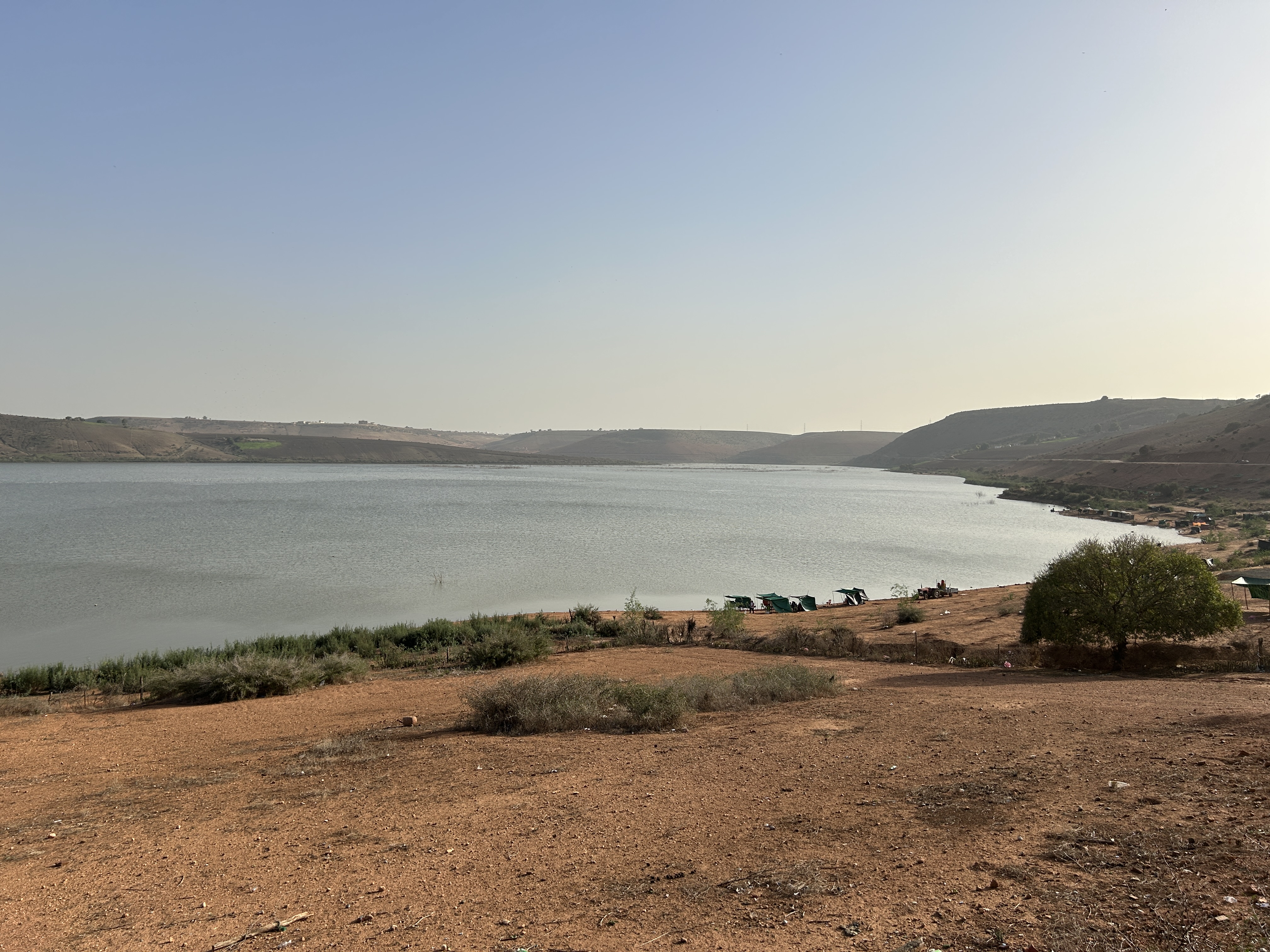

- Location in Morocco
- Coordinates: 33.447°N 7.328°W
- Country: Morocco
- Region: Casablanca-Settat
- Province: Benslimane

Population (2004)
  - Total: 9,066
- Time zone: UTC+0 (GMT)

Moualine el Oued is a town in Benslimane Province, Casablanca-Settat, Morocco. According to the 2004 census it has a population of 9,066.
