= Fdalate =

Coordinates: 33°35′28″N 7°16′45″W

- Town
- Interactive map of Fdalate
- Country: Morocco
- Region: Casablanca-Settat
- Province: Benslimane

Population (2014)
  - Total: 11,966
- Time zone: UTC+0 (GMT)

Fdalate is a town and rural commune in Benslimane Province, Casablanca-Settat, Morocco. According to the 2004 census it has a population of 9,796.
