= Mellila, Morocco =

Coordinates: 33°23′N 7°08′W

- Town
- Mellila in 2023
- Interactive map of Mellila, Morocco
- Country: Morocco
- Region: Casablanca-Settat
- Province: Benslimane

Population (2014)
  - Total: 15,081
- Time zone: UTC+0 (GMT)

Mellila, Morocco is a town and rural commune in Benslimane Province, Casablanca-Settat, Morocco. According to the 2004 census it had a population of 14,257.
