= Tarik Tnibar =

Moroccan footballer

Personal information
- Full name: Tarik Tnibar
- Date of birth: June 17, 1986 (age 40)
- Place of birth: Mohammedia, Morocco
- Position: Forward

Youth career
- ?–2005: Chabab Mohammedia

Senior career*
Years	Team	Apps	(Gls)
2005–2009	Chabab Mohammedia	-	(-)
2009–	Raja Casablanca	1	(0)
- * Club domestic league appearances and goals as of January 15, 2010 ‡ National team caps and goals as of October 17, 2008

Tarik Tnibar (Arabic: طارق الطنيبر) is a Moroccan footballer. He usually plays as forward.

Tnibar previously played for Chabab Mohammedia and signed a five-year contract with Raja in July 2009.
