= Oulad Yahya Louta =

- Town
- Location in Morocco
- Coordinates: 33.536°N 7.197°W
- Country: Morocco
- Region: Casablanca-Settat
- Province: Benslimane

Population (2014)
  - Total: 9,430
- Time zone: UTC+0 (GMT)

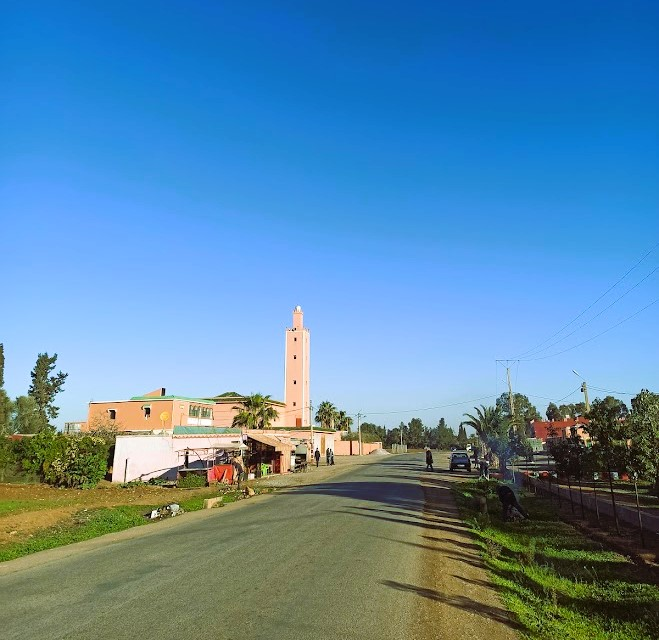
Oulad Yahya Louta

Oulad Yahya Louta is a town and rural commune in Benslimane Province, Casablanca-Settat, Morocco. According to the 2004 census it had a population of 9,642.
