= Ain Tizgha =

Rural commune in Morocco

Ain Tizgha عين تيزغة
- Town
- Coordinates: 33°39′58″N 7°04′17″W
- Country: Morocco
- Region: Casablanca-Settat
- Province: Benslimane

Population (2014)
  - Total: 15,692
- Time zone: UTC+0 (GMT)

Ain Tizgha (Arabic: عين تيزغة) is a town and rural municipality in Morocco located in the province of Benslimane, Casablanca-Settat region. It has a population of 15 692 inhabitants (2014 census).
