= Bir Ennasr =

- Town
- Location in Morocco
- Coordinates: 33.340°N 6.916°W
- Country: Morocco
- Region: Casablanca-Settat
- Province: Benslimane

Population (2014)
  - Total: 4,855
- Time zone: UTC+0 (GMT)

Bir Ennasr is a town and rural commune in Benslimane Province, Casablanca-Settat, Morocco. According to the 2004 census it has a population of 5,195.
