= Bouznika =

Bouznika بوزنيقة (Arabic) ⴱⵓⵣⵏⵉⵇⴰ (Standard Moroccan Tamazight)
- Municipality
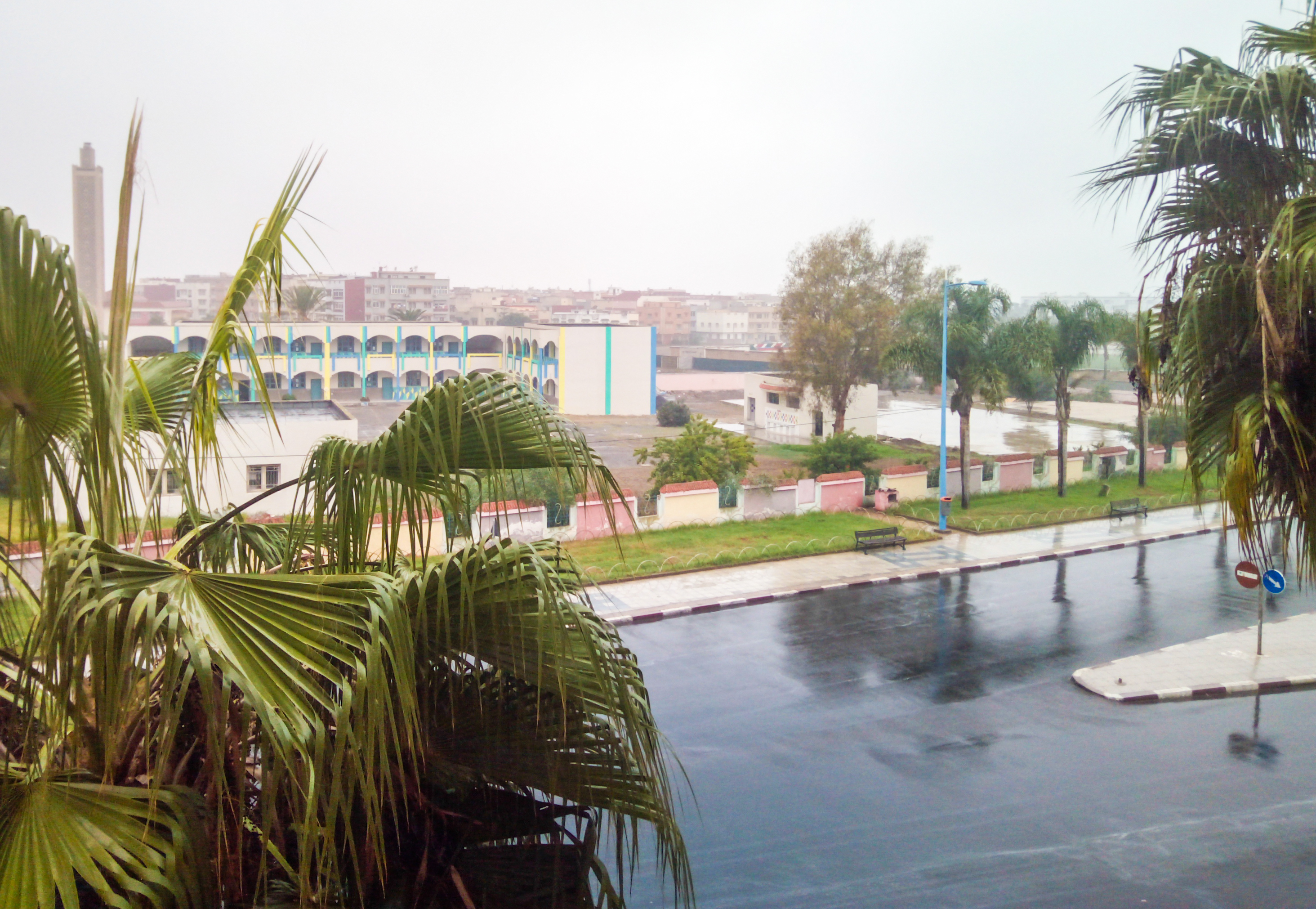
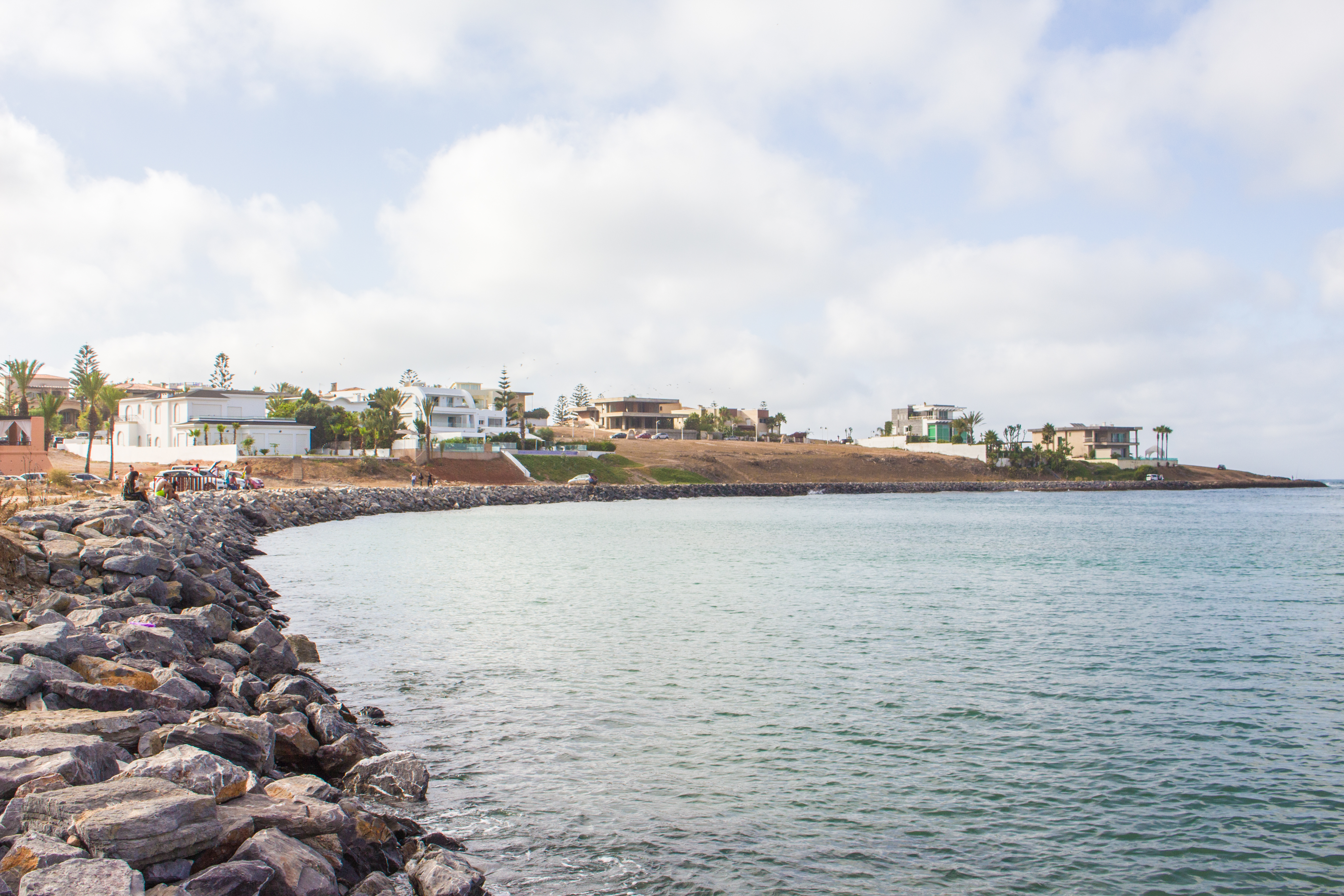
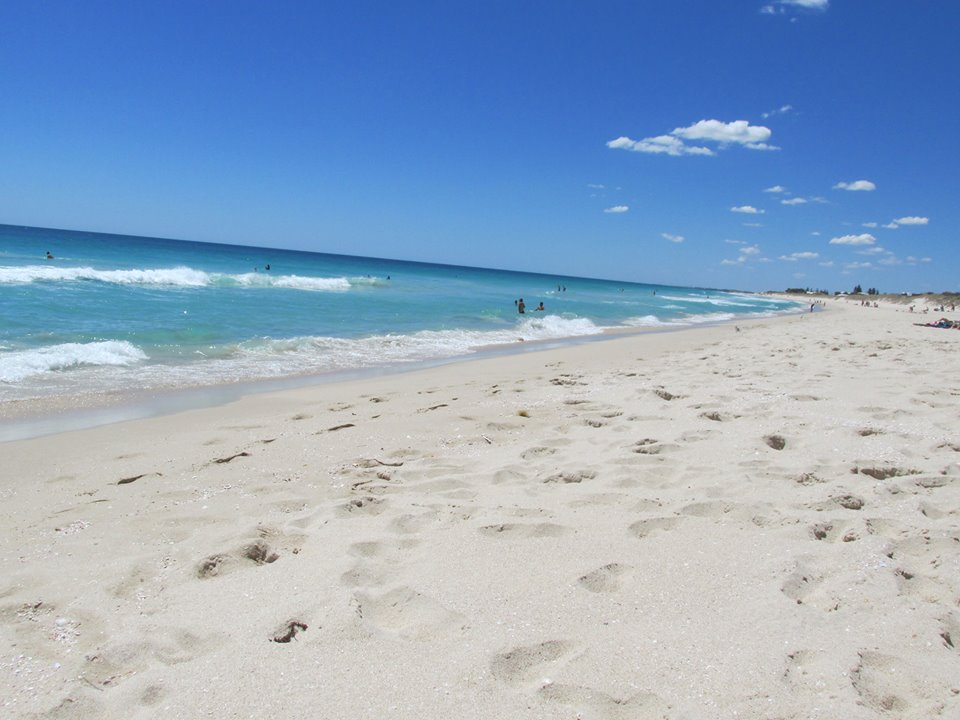
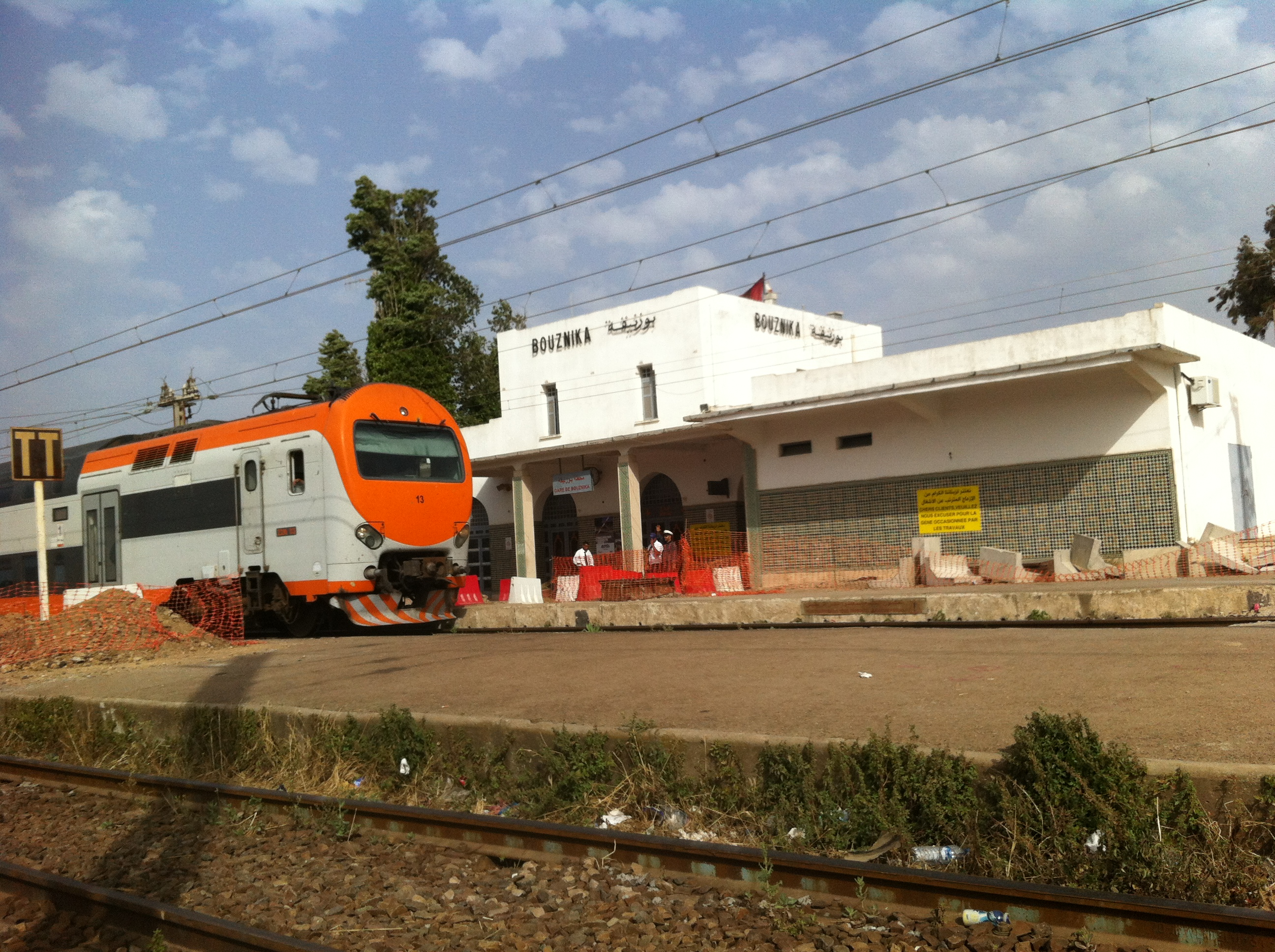
- Interactive map of Bouznika
- Coordinates: 33°47′23″N 7°9′27″W
- Country: Morocco
- Region: Casablanca-Settat
- Province: Benslimane

Population (2024)
  - Total: 55,722
- Time zone: UTC+0 (GMT)

Bouznika (Arabic: بوزنيقة, romanized: būznīqa) is a city in Benslimane Province, Casablanca-Settat, Morocco, in the historical region of Chaouia.

== Etymology ==
The city's name means "Owner of the small alley" in Arabic, coming from bou (owner), and zniqa (the diminutive of zanqa, meaning street).

== History ==
The city was built in casbah located in the North-West of the agglomeration founded by Moulay Abderrahman in 1858 because it was represented as an exchange crossroads and an important crossing point.

== Economy ==
Located between Casablanca and Rabat, the town of Bouznika was only a stopover, a relay point for motorists and coaches a few decades ago. Its position has made this small town a place to eat for travelers between Rabat and Casablanca. Renowned for its grills, its tagines and the quality of its meat, the culinary reputation is maintained despite the development of other economic sectors. With the redevelopment of small restaurants that had become dilapidated, Bouznika has regained its clientele and its culinary art. Agriculture, processing industry, tourism, town planning and restoration are assets.
