= El Mansouria, Morocco =

Coordinates: 33°45′N 7°18′W

El Mansouria المنصورية
- Town
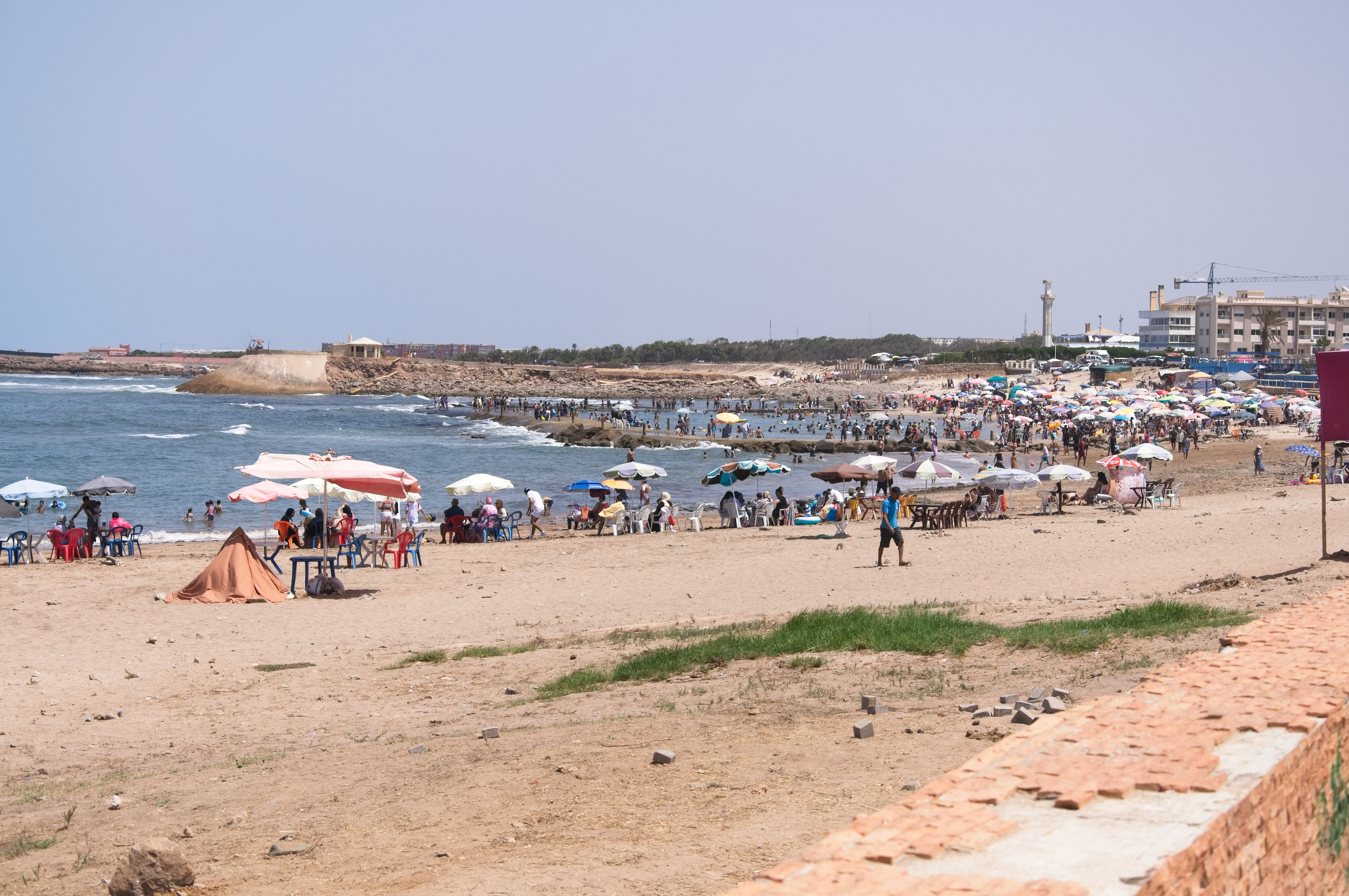
- El Mansouria beach
- Interactive map of El Mansouria
- Country: Morocco
- Region: Casablanca-Settat
- Province: Benslimane

Population (2014)
  - Total: 19,853
- Time zone: UTC+0 (GMT)

El Mansouria is a town in Ben Slimane Province, Casablanca-Settat, Morocco. According to the 2004 census it had a population of 12,955.
