= VinFast – Trong Dong Stadium =

Proposed stadium in Hanoi, Vietnam

VinFast – Trống Đồng Stadium
- Sân vận động VinFast - Trống Đồng
- The Bronze Drum
- Construction site as of October 2026
- Interactive map of VinFast – Trống Đồng Stadium
- Former names: Lạc Việt Stadium; Hùng Vương Stadium; Trống Đồng Stadium; VinFast Stadium
- Address: Zone B, Hanoi International Sports Urban Area, Thượng Phúc Commune, Hanoi, Vietnam
- Location: Hung Vuong International Sports Complex
- Coordinates: 20°50′31″N 105°49′55″E
- Owner: Vingroup
- Capacity: 135,000
- Roof: Retractable
- Surface: Natural grass (planned)

Construction
- Groundbreaking: 19 December 2025
- Opened: July 2027
- Builder: Vingroup

VinFast – Trống Đồng Stadium (Vietnamese: Sân vận động VinFast – Trống Đồng, lit. 'VinFast - Bronze Drum Stadium'), originally and colloquially known the Bronze Drum Stadium (Sân vận động Trống Đồng), is an under-construction association football stadium in Hanoi, Vietnam. Being a core component of Vingroup's Hùng Vương International Sports Complex, when completed, it will be the largest by capacity in the world.

The stadium is named after VinFast Auto, a Vingroup company, and the Dong Son drum, a traditional Vietnamese decoration and the stadium's inspiration of design.

== Plan ==
VinFast Stadium was originally launched as the Lạc Việt Stadium. The groundbreaking for the stadium later renamed as the Trống Đồng Stadium took place on 19 December 2025, before becoming Hùng Vương Stadium in April 2026. It is part of a larger sports complex in Hanoi by Vingroup.

In July 2026, the stadium adopted its a new name, the VinFast Stadium, before being revised to the VinFast – Trống Đồng Stadium in August.

== Facilities ==
Sitting on a 73.3 hectares (181 acres) land, VinFast Stadium will have a seating capacity of 135,000 and is expected to be the largest association football stadium in the world. It will have a retractable roof. The facility's facade is patterned after the Đông Sơn drum and has elements inspired from the Lạc bird.
