= Ahlaf =

- Town
- Location in Morocco
- Country: Morocco
- Region: Casablanca-Settat
- Province: Benslimane

Population (2014)
  - Total: 11,451
- Time zone: UTC+0 (GMT)

Ahlaf is a town in Benslimane Province, Casablanca-Settat, Morocco. According to the 2004 census it had a population of 12,841.
