= Benslimane Province =

Province of Morocco

Coordinates: 33°37′28″N 7°7′46″W

Benslimane Province إقليم بنسليمان
- Province
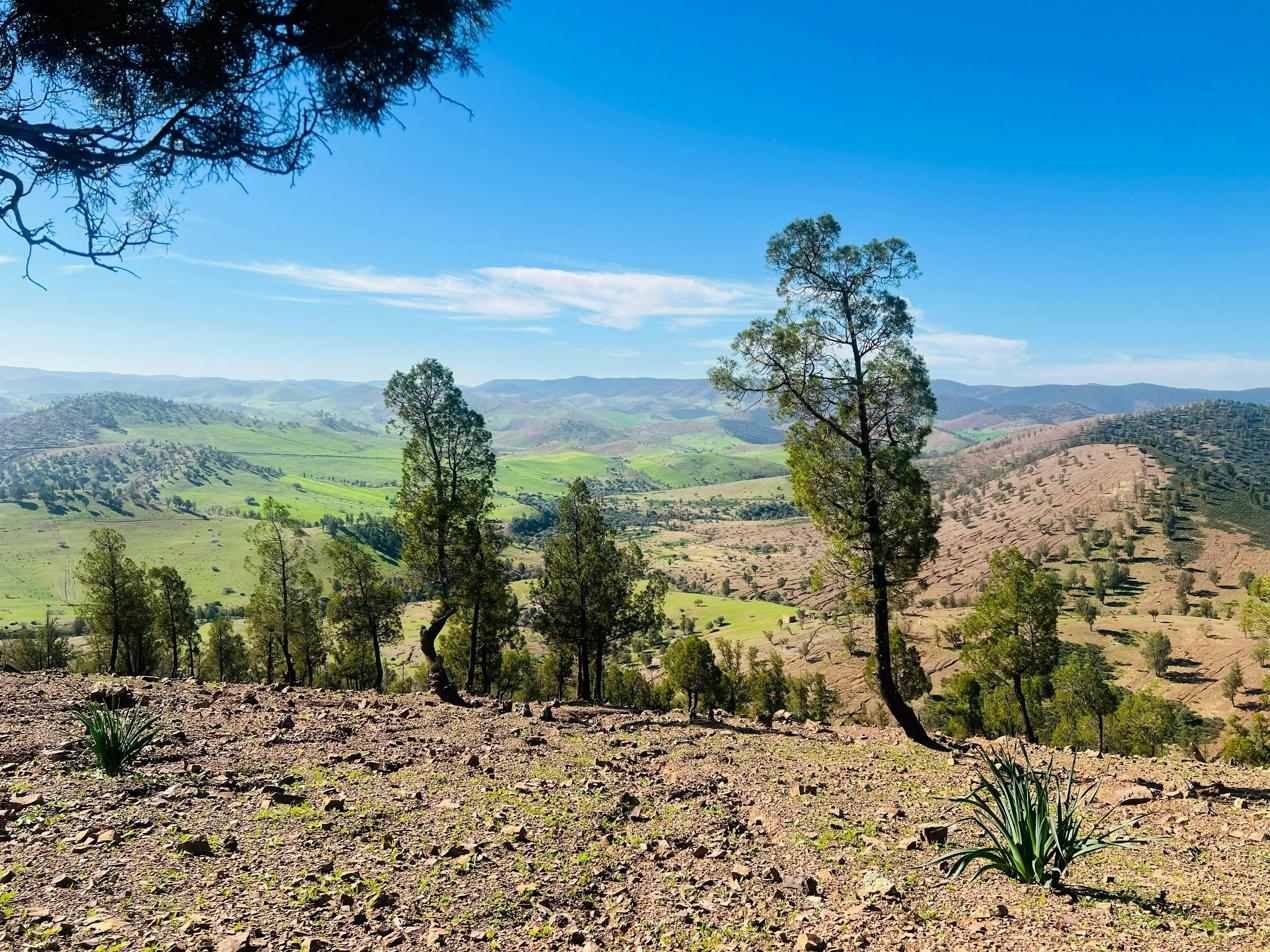
- Interactive map of Benslimane Province
- Country: Morocco
- Region: Casablanca-Settat
- Capital: Benslimane

Area
  - Total: 2,760 km^{2} (1,070 sq mi)

Population (2024)
  - Total: 279,517
  - Density: 101/km^{2} (262/sq mi)

Benslimane (Arabic: بنسليمان) is a province of Morocco in the Casablanca-Settat Region. The province had a population of 279,517 people in 2024 and covers an area of around 2,760 km^{2}.

The major cities are :

- Benslimane
- Bouznika
- El Mansouria

== Subdivisions ==
The province is divided administratively into the following:

Name	Geographic code	Type	Households	Population (2004)	Foreign population	Moroccan population	Notes
Benslimane	111.01.01.	Municipality	9430	46478	37	46441	
Bouznika	111.01.03.	Municipality	5305	27028	49	26979	
Ahlaf	111.03.01.	Rural commune	2220	12841	0	12841	
Ain Tizgha	111.03.03.	Rural commune	1264	7741	3	7738	
Fdalate	111.03.05.	Rural commune	1800	9796	1	9795	
Mellila	111.03.07.	Rural commune	2432	14257	0	14257	
Moualine el Ghaba	111.03.09.	Rural commune	1412	8185	2	8183	
Moualine el Oued	111.03.11.	Rural commune	1657	9066	0	9066	
Oulad Ali Toualaa	111.03.13.	Rural commune	860	5056	0	5056	
Oulad Yahya Louta	111.03.15.	Rural commune	1670	9642	1	9641	
Rdadna Oulad Malek	111.03.17.	Rural commune	826	4348	0	4348	
Ziaida	111.03.19.	Rural commune	2003	12389	3	12386	
Bir Ennasar	111.05.01.	Rural commune	775	5195	0	5195	
El Mansouria	111.05.03.	Rural commune	2787	12955	133	12822	
Sidi Bettache	111.05.04.	Rural commune	1215	6370	1	6369	
Cherrat	111.05.05.	Rural commune	1254	8265	1	8264	
