= 2015 FIFA U-17 World Cup =

Copa Mundial de Fútbol Sub-17 de 2015

Tournament details
- Host country: Chile
- Dates: 17 October – 8 November
- Teams: 24 (from 6 confederations)
- Venues: 8 (in 8 host cities)

Final positions
- Champions: Nigeria (5th title)
- Runners-up: Mali
- Third place: Belgium
- Fourth place: Mexico

Tournament statistics
- Matches played: 52
- Goals scored: 151 (2.9 per match)
- Attendance: 482,490 (9,279 per match)
- Top scorer: (Nigeria) Victor Osimhen (10 goals)
- Best player: (Nigeria) Kelechi Nwakali
- Best goalkeeper: (Mali) Samuel Diarra
- Fair play award: Ecuador

The 2015 FIFA U-17 World Cup was the sixteenth tournament of the FIFA U-17 World Cup, held in Chile from 17 October to 8 November 2015.

== Host selection ==
The following four countries bid to host the tournament:

- Chile
- Russia
- Tunisia
- Wales

== Venues ==
Along with proposing ten venues for Chile's hosting of the 2015 Copa América, the Chilean Football Federation also announced its plans for hosting of the U-17 World Cup in the same year. On 8 April 2014, 8 cities were confirmed as hosts of the competition, with Copiapó and Quillota being dropped.

The local organising committee also said that the capital city (Santiago) would not host the final.

| La Serena | Location of the host cities of the 2015 FIFA U-17 World Cup. | Coquimbo |
|---|---|---|
| Estadio La Portada | Location of the host cities of the 2015 FIFA U-17 World Cup. | Estadio Municipal Francisco Sánchez Rumoroso |
| Capacity: 18,243 | Location of the host cities of the 2015 FIFA U-17 World Cup. | Capacity: 18,750 |
| Viña del Mar | Location of the host cities of the 2015 FIFA U-17 World Cup. | Santiago |
| Estadio Sausalito | Location of the host cities of the 2015 FIFA U-17 World Cup. | Estadio Nacional Julio Martínez Prádanos |
| Capacity: 22,340 | Location of the host cities of the 2015 FIFA U-17 World Cup. | Capacity: 48,665 |
| Talca | Location of the host cities of the 2015 FIFA U-17 World Cup. | Chillán |
| Estadio Fiscal de Talca | Location of the host cities of the 2015 FIFA U-17 World Cup. | Estadio Municipal de Chillán Nelson Oyarzún Arenas |
| Capacity: 8,200 | Location of the host cities of the 2015 FIFA U-17 World Cup. | Capacity: 12,000 |
| Concepción | Location of the host cities of the 2015 FIFA U-17 World Cup. | Puerto Montt |
| Estadio Municipal de Concepción | Location of the host cities of the 2015 FIFA U-17 World Cup. | Estadio Regional de Chinquihue |
| Capacity: 30,448 | Location of the host cities of the 2015 FIFA U-17 World Cup. | Capacity: 10,000 |

== Qualified teams ==
In addition to host nation Chile, 23 nations qualified from 6 separate continental competitions.

| Confederation | Qualifying Tournament | Qualifier(s) |
|---|---|---|
| AFC (Asia) | 2014 AFC U-16 Championship | Australia; North Korea; South Korea; Syria |
| CAF (Africa) | 2015 African U-17 Championship | Guinea; Mali; Nigeria; South Africa^{1} |
| CONCACAF (Central, North America and Caribbean) | 2015 CONCACAF U-17 Championship | Costa Rica; Honduras; Mexico; United States |
| CONMEBOL (South America) | Host nation | Chile |
| CONMEBOL (South America) | 2015 South American Under-17 Championship | Argentina; Brazil; Ecuador; Paraguay |
| OFC (Oceania) | 2015 OFC U-17 Championship | New Zealand |
| UEFA (Europe) | 2015 UEFA European Under-17 Championship | Belgium; Croatia; England; France; Germany; Russia |

1.Teams that made their debut.

== Schedule and draw ==
The schedule of the tournament was unveiled on 5 May 2015.

The final draw was held on 6 August 2015, 20:00 local time, at the Centro de las Artes 660 art gallery in Santiago. For the draw, the 24 teams were divided into four seeding pots:

- Pot 1: Hosts and continental champions of five confederations (except UEFA)
- Pot 2: Remaining teams from CONCACAF and AFC
- Pot 3: Remaining teams from CAF and CONMEBOL
- Pot 4: Teams from UEFA

As a basic principle, teams from the same confederation could not be drawn against each other at the group stage.

| Pot 1 | Pot 2 | Pot 3 | Pot 4 |
|---|---|---|---|
| Chile (A1); Brazil; North Korea; Mali; Mexico; New Zealand | Costa Rica; Honduras; United States; Australia; South Korea; Syria | Guinea; Nigeria; South Africa; Argentina; Ecuador; Paraguay | Belgium; Croatia; England; France; Germany; Russia |

== Match officials ==
A total of 21 referees, 6 support referees, and 42 assistant referees were selected for the tournament.

| Confederation | Referee | Assistant referees | Support referee |
|---|---|---|---|
| AFC | (Qatar) Abdulrahman Al-Jassim | (Qatar) Taleb Al-Marri (Qatar) Saud Al-Maqaleh | (Sri Lanka) Hettikamkanamge Perera |
| AFC | (Malaysia) Mohd Amirul Izwan | (Malaysia) Mohd Yusri Mohamad (Malaysia) Azman Ismail | (Sri Lanka) Hettikamkanamge Perera |
| AFC | (United Arab Emirates) Abdulla Hassan Mohamed | (United Arab Emirates) Mohamed Al-Hammadi (United Arab Emirates) Hasan Al-Mahri | (Sri Lanka) Hettikamkanamge Perera |
| CAF | (Algeria) Mehdi Abid Charef | (Tunisia) Anouar Hmila (Rwanda) Theogene Ndagijimana | (Ethiopia) Bamlak Tessema Weyesa |
| CAF | (Senegal) Malang Diedhiou | (Senegal) Djibril Camara (Guinea) Aboubacar Doumbouya | (Ethiopia) Bamlak Tessema Weyesa |
| CAF | (Zambia) Janny Sikazwe | (Mozambique) Arsenio Marengula (Angola) Jerson Emiliano Dos Santos | (Ethiopia) Bamlak Tessema Weyesa |
| CONCACAF | (Jamaica) Valdin Legister | (Jamaica) Kedlee Powell (Jamaica) Richard Washington | (Guatemala) Óscar Reyna |
| CONCACAF | (Costa Rica) Ricardo Montero | (Costa Rica) Juan Mora (Costa Rica) Warner Castro | (Guatemala) Óscar Reyna |
| CONCACAF | (Honduras) Héctor Rodríguez | (Honduras) Cristian Ramírez (Honduras) Walter López Ramos | (Guatemala) Óscar Reyna |
| CONMEBOL | (Paraguay) Enrique Cáceres | (Paraguay) Eduardo Cardozo (Paraguay) Juan Zorrilla | (Bolivia) Gery Vargas |
| CONMEBOL | (Peru) Diego Haro | (Peru) Raúl López Cruz (Peru) Víctor Ráez | (Bolivia) Gery Vargas |
| CONMEBOL | (Colombia) Wilson Lamouroux | (Colombia) Alexander Guzman (Colombia) Wilmar Navarro | (Bolivia) Gery Vargas |
| CONMEBOL | (Chile) Roberto Tobar | (Chile) Marcelo Barraza (Chile) Christian Schiemann | (Bolivia) Gery Vargas |
| OFC | (New Zealand) Nick Waldron | (New Zealand) Glen Lochrie (Fiji) Ravinesh Kumar | (French Polynesia) Kader Zitouni |
| UEFA | (Ukraine) Yevhen Aranovskiy | (Ukraine) Ihor Alokhin (Ukraine) Oleksandr Korniyko | (Switzerland) Stephan Klossner |
| UEFA | (Germany) Deniz Aytekin | (Germany) Guido Kleve (Germany) Markus Häcker | (Switzerland) Stephan Klossner |
| UEFA | (France) Ruddy Buquet | (France) Guillaume Debart (France) Cyril Gringore | (Switzerland) Stephan Klossner |
| UEFA | (Slovenia) Matej Jug | (Slovenia) Matej Žunič (Slovenia) Gregor Rojko | (Switzerland) Stephan Klossner |
| UEFA | (Netherlands) Danny Makkelie | (Netherlands) Mario Diks (Netherlands) Hessel Steegstra | (Switzerland) Stephan Klossner |
| UEFA | (England) Michael Oliver | (England) Stuart Burt (England) Gary Beswick | (Switzerland) Stephan Klossner |
| UEFA | (Sweden) Martin Strömbergsson | (Sweden) Daniel Gustavsson (Sweden) Mehmet Culum | (Switzerland) Stephan Klossner |

== Emblem and slogan ==
The emblem and slogan ("Una fiesta en nuestra cancha", a party on our pitch) of the tournament was unveiled on 7 October 2014.

== Squads ==
Each team named a squad of 21 players (three of whom must be goalkeepers) by the FIFA deadline. The squads were announced on 8 October 2015.

All players of its representative team must have been born on or after 1 January 1998.

== Group stage ==
The winners and runners-up of each group and the best four third-placed teams advance to the round of 16. The rankings of teams in each group are determined as follows:

1. points obtained in all group matches;
2. goal difference in all group matches;
3. number of goals scored in all group matches;

If two or more teams are equal on the basis of the above three criteria, their rankings are determined as follows:

4. points obtained in the group matches between the teams concerned;
5. goal difference in the group matches between the teams concerned;
6. number of goals scored in the group matches between the teams concerned;
7. fair play points (first yellow card: minus 1 point; second yellow/indirect red card: minus 3 points; direct red card: minus 3 points; yellow card & direct red card: minus 4 points);
8. drawing of lots by the FIFA Organising Committee.

All times are local, Chile Standard Time (UTC−3).

=== Group A ===
| Pos | Team | Pld | W | D | L | GF | GA | GD | Pts | Group stage result |
|---|---|---|---|---|---|---|---|---|---|---|
| 1 | Nigeria | 3 | 2 | 0 | 1 | 8 | 3 | +5 | 6 | Advanced to knockout stage |
| 2 | Croatia | 3 | 1 | 2 | 0 | 5 | 4 | +1 | 5 | Advanced to knockout stage |
| 3 | Chile (H) | 3 | 1 | 1 | 1 | 6 | 7 | −1 | 4 | Advanced to knockout stage |
| 4 | United States | 3 | 0 | 1 | 2 | 3 | 8 | −5 | 1 | |

Source: FIFA
(H) Hosts
17 October 2015
17:00

| Nigeria | 2–0 | United States |
|---|---|---|
| Agor 50'; Osimhen 61' | Report |

Estadio Nacional Julio Martínez Prádanos, Santiago
Attendance: 20,637
Referee: Deniz Aytekin (Germany)
17 October 2015
20:00

| Chile | 1–1 | Croatia |
|---|---|---|
| Y. Leiva 33' | Report | Moro 8' |

Estadio Nacional Julio Martínez Prádanos, Santiago
Attendance: 20,637
Referee: Abdulrahman Al-Jassim (Qatar)

20 October 2015
17:00

| United States | 2–2 | Croatia |
|---|---|---|
| Pulisic 20'; Vazquez 40' | Report | Majić 65'; Ivanušec 77' |

Estadio Sausalito, Viña del Mar
Attendance: 21,893
Referee: Enrique Cáceres (Paraguay)
20 October 2015
20:00

| Chile | 1–5 | Nigeria |
|---|---|---|
| Allende 81' | Report | Chukwueze 1', 61'; Nwakali 17' (pen.); Osimhen 66' (pen.), 86' |

Estadio Sausalito, Viña del Mar
Attendance: 21,893
Referee: Ruddy Buquet (France)

23 October 2015
20:00

| United States | 1–4 | Chile |
|---|---|---|
| Vazquez 10' | Report | Allende 20'; Mazuela 52'; Jara 86'; Moya 90+3' |

Estadio Sausalito, Viña del Mar
Attendance: 19,321
Referee: Matej Jug (Slovenia)
23 October 2015
20:00

| Croatia | 2–1 | Nigeria |
|---|---|---|
| Brekalo 50'; Majić 54' | Report | Osimhen 20' |

Estadio Municipal Francisco Sánchez Rumoroso, Coquimbo
Attendance: 5,606
Referee: Wilson Lamouroux (Colombia)

=== Group B ===
| Pos | Team | Pld | W | D | L | GF | GA | GD | Pts | Group stage result |
|---|---|---|---|---|---|---|---|---|---|---|
| 1 | South Korea | 3 | 2 | 1 | 0 | 2 | 0 | +2 | 7 | Advanced to knockout stage |
| 2 | Brazil | 3 | 2 | 0 | 1 | 4 | 2 | +2 | 6 | Advanced to knockout stage |
| 3 | England | 3 | 0 | 2 | 1 | 1 | 2 | −1 | 2 | |
| 4 | Guinea | 3 | 0 | 1 | 2 | 2 | 5 | −3 | 1 | |

Source: FIFA
17 October 2015
16:00

| England | 1–1 | Guinea |
|---|---|---|
| Hinds 61' | Report | N. Bangoura 76' |

Estadio Municipal Francisco Sánchez Rumoroso, Coquimbo
Attendance: 5,333
Referee: Roberto Tobar (Chile)
17 October 2015
19:00

| Brazil | 0–1 | South Korea |
|---|---|---|
| | Report | Jang Jae-won 79' |

Estadio Municipal Francisco Sánchez Rumoroso, Coquimbo
Attendance: 5,333
Referee: Ricardo Montero (Costa Rica)

20 October 2015
17:00

| England | 0–1 | Brazil |
|---|---|---|
| | Report | Leandrinho 67' |

Estadio La Portada, La Serena
Attendance: 8,225
Referee: Abdulla Hassan Mohamed (United Arab Emirates)
20 October 2015
20:00

| South Korea | 1–0 | Guinea |
|---|---|---|
| Oh Se-hun 90+2' | Report |

Estadio La Portada, La Serena
Attendance: 8,225
Referee: Héctor Rodríguez (Honduras)

23 October 2015
17:00

| Guinea | 1–3 | Brazil |
|---|---|---|
| Morlaye 83' | Report | Lincoln 15' (pen.); Leandrinho 33'; Arthur 67' |

Estadio Sausalito, Viña del Mar
Attendance: 19,321
Referee: Deniz Aytekin (Germany)
23 October 2015
17:00

| South Korea | 0–0 | England |
|---|---|---|
| | Report |

Estadio Municipal Francisco Sánchez Rumoroso, Coquimbo
Attendance: 5,606
Referee: Valdin Legister (Jamaica)

=== Group C ===
| Pos | Team | Pld | W | D | L | GF | GA | GD | Pts | Group stage result |
|---|---|---|---|---|---|---|---|---|---|---|
| 1 | Mexico | 3 | 2 | 1 | 0 | 4 | 1 | +3 | 7 | Advanced to knockout stage |
| 2 | Germany | 3 | 2 | 0 | 1 | 9 | 3 | +6 | 6 | Advanced to knockout stage |
| 3 | Australia | 3 | 1 | 1 | 1 | 3 | 5 | −2 | 4 | Advanced to knockout stage |
| 4 | Argentina | 3 | 0 | 0 | 3 | 1 | 8 | −7 | 0 | |

Source: FIFA
18 October 2015
16:00

| Australia | 1–4 | Germany |
|---|---|---|
| Waring 54' | Report | Passlack 14'; Eggestein 25', 39'; Janelt 65' |

Estadio Municipal Nelson Oyarzún Arenas, Chillán
Attendance: 7,366
Referee: Mehdi Abid Charef (Algeria)
18 October 2015
19:00

| Mexico | 2–0 | Argentina |
|---|---|---|
| Magaña 10'; Venegas 77' (pen.) | Report |

Estadio Municipal Nelson Oyarzún Arenas, Chillán
Attendance: 7,366
Referee: Danny Makkelie (Netherlands)

21 October 2015
17:00

| Australia | 0–0 | Mexico |
|---|---|---|
| | Report |

Estadio Municipal Nelson Oyarzún Arenas, Chillán
Attendance: 8,469
Referee: Janny Sikazwe (Zambia)
21 October 2015
20:00

| Argentina | 0–4 | Germany |
|---|---|---|
| | Report | Janelt 5'; Eggestein 32'; Passlack 45+2' (pen.); Schmidt 67' |

Estadio Municipal Nelson Oyarzún Arenas, Chillán
Attendance: 8,469
Referee: Ricardo Montero (Costa Rica)

24 October 2015
19:00

| Argentina | 1–2 | Australia |
|---|---|---|
| Conechny 67' (pen.) | Report | Panetta 25', 52' |

Estadio Municipal Nelson Oyarzún Arenas, Chillán
Attendance: 4,409
Referee: Ruddy Buquet (France)
24 October 2015
19:00

| Germany | 1–2 | Mexico |
|---|---|---|
| Eggestein 68' | Report | López 59'; Venegas 65' |

Estadio Fiscal de Talca, Talca
Attendance: 6,229
Referee: Enrique Cáceres (Paraguay)

=== Group D ===
| Pos | Team | Pld | W | D | L | GF | GA | GD | Pts | Group stage result |
|---|---|---|---|---|---|---|---|---|---|---|
| 1 | Mali | 3 | 2 | 1 | 0 | 5 | 1 | +4 | 7 | Advanced to knockout stage |
| 2 | Ecuador | 3 | 2 | 0 | 1 | 6 | 3 | +3 | 6 | Advanced to knockout stage |
| 3 | Belgium | 3 | 1 | 1 | 1 | 2 | 3 | −1 | 4 | Advanced to knockout stage |
| 4 | Honduras | 3 | 0 | 0 | 3 | 2 | 8 | −6 | 0 | |

Source: FIFA
18 October 2015
16:00

| Belgium | 0–0 | Mali |
|---|---|---|
| | Report |

Estadio Fiscal de Talca, Talca
Attendance: 3,509
Referee: Nick Waldron (New Zealand)
18 October 2015
19:00

| Honduras | 1–3 | Ecuador |
|---|---|---|
| Grant 83' | Report | Guerrero 7'; Estupiñán 19' (pen.); Cortez 76' |

Estadio Fiscal de Talca, Talca
Attendance: 3,509
Referee: Michael Oliver (England)

21 October 2015
17:00

| Belgium | 2–1 | Honduras |
|---|---|---|
| Vancamp 21'; Rigo 78' | Report | Leiva 49' |

Estadio Fiscal de Talca, Talca
Attendance: 4,721
Referee: Diego Haro (Peru)
21 October 2015
20:00

| Ecuador | 1–2 | Mali |
|---|---|---|
| Estupiñán 70' (pen.) | Report | B. Traoré 9'; Malle 61' |

Estadio Fiscal de Talca, Talca
Attendance: 4,721
Referee: Martin Strömbergsson (Sweden)

24 October 2015
16:00

| Mali | 3–0 | Honduras |
|---|---|---|
| A. Haidara 7'; Danté 34'; Malle 56' | Report |

Estadio Municipal Nelson Oyarzún Arenas, Chillán
Attendance: 4,409
Referee: Nick Waldron (New Zealand)
24 October 2015
16:00

| Ecuador | 2–0 | Belgium |
|---|---|---|
| Corozo 40'; Guerrero 73' | Report |

Estadio Fiscal de Talca, Talca
Attendance: 6,229
Referee: Abdulrahman Al-Jassim (Qatar)

=== Group E ===
| Pos | Team | Pld | W | D | L | GF | GA | GD | Pts | Group stage result |
|---|---|---|---|---|---|---|---|---|---|---|
| 1 | Russia | 3 | 2 | 1 | 0 | 5 | 1 | +4 | 7 | Advanced to knockout stage |
| 2 | Costa Rica | 3 | 1 | 1 | 1 | 4 | 4 | 0 | 4 | Advanced to knockout stage |
| 3 | North Korea | 3 | 1 | 1 | 1 | 3 | 4 | −1 | 4 | Advanced to knockout stage |
| 4 | South Africa | 3 | 0 | 1 | 2 | 2 | 5 | −3 | 1 | |

Source: FIFA
19 October 2015
17:00

| South Africa | 1–2 | Costa Rica |
|---|---|---|
| Mayo 90' | Report | Masís 7'; Reyes 63' (pen.) |

Estadio Municipal de Concepción, Concepción
Attendance: 7,572
Referee: Mohd Amirul Izwan Yaacob (Malaysia)
19 October 2015
20:00

| North Korea | 0–2 | Russia |
|---|---|---|
| | Report | Galanin 3'; Chalov 52' |

Estadio Municipal de Concepción, Concepción
Attendance: 7,572
Referee: Wilson Lamouroux (Colombia)

22 October 2015
17:00

| South Africa | 1–1 | North Korea |
|---|---|---|
| Mukumela 10' (pen.) | Report | Kim Wi-song 17' (pen.) |

Estadio Municipal de Concepción, Concepción
Attendance: 9,322
Referee: Yevhen Aranovskiy (Ukraine)
22 October 2015
20:00

| Russia | 1–1 | Costa Rica |
|---|---|---|
| Chalov 82' | Report | Ramírez 71' |

Estadio Municipal de Concepción, Concepción
Attendance: 9,322
Referee: Roberto Tobar (Chile)

25 October 2015
19:00

| Russia | 2–0 | South Africa |
|---|---|---|
| Makhatadze 5' (pen.), 89' | Report |

Estadio Municipal de Concepción, Concepción
Attendance: 13,759
Referee: Diego Haro (Peru)
25 October 2015
19:00

| Costa Rica | 1–2 | North Korea |
|---|---|---|
| Mesén 84' | Report | Pak Yong-gwan 14'; Jong Chang-bom 90+3' |

Estadio Regional de Chinquihue, Puerto Montt
Attendance: 6,571
Referee: Danny Makkelie (Netherlands)

=== Group F ===
| Pos | Team | Pld | W | D | L | GF | GA | GD | Pts | Group stage result |
|---|---|---|---|---|---|---|---|---|---|---|
| 1 | France | 3 | 3 | 0 | 0 | 14 | 4 | +10 | 9 | Advanced to knockout stage |
| 2 | New Zealand | 3 | 1 | 1 | 1 | 3 | 7 | −4 | 4 | Advanced to knockout stage |
| 3 | Paraguay | 3 | 1 | 0 | 2 | 8 | 7 | +1 | 3 | |
| 4 | Syria | 3 | 0 | 1 | 2 | 1 | 8 | −7 | 1 | |

Source: FIFA
19 October 2015
17:00

| New Zealand | 1–6 | France |
|---|---|---|
| McGarry 76' | Report | McGarry 15' (o.g.); Boutobba 32'; Maouassa 34'; Doucouré 42'; Georgen 45'; Édouard 90+2' |

Estadio Regional de Chinquihue, Puerto Montt
Attendance: 8,134
Referee: Valdin Legister (Jamaica)
19 October 2015
20:00

| Syria | 1–4 | Paraguay |
|---|---|---|
| Al-Aji 62' | Report | Morel 30'; Villalba 34'; Colmán 65'; Ferreira 90' |

Estadio Regional de Chinquihue, Puerto Montt
Attendance: 8,134
Referee: Matej Jug (Slovenia)

22 October 2015
17:00

| New Zealand | 0–0 | Syria |
|---|---|---|
| | Report |

Estadio Regional de Chinquihue, Puerto Montt
Attendance: 8,955
Referee: Malang Diedhiou (Senegal)
22 October 2015
20:00

| Paraguay | 3–4 | France |
|---|---|---|
| Aranda 45' (pen.); Villalba 57'; Paredes 62' | Report | Boutobba 3'; Ikoné 22', 71'; Upamecano 59' |

Estadio Regional de Chinquihue, Puerto Montt
Attendance: 8,955
Referee: Mehdi Abid Charef (Algeria)

25 October 2015
16:00

| France | 4–0 | Syria |
|---|---|---|
| Janvier 22', 46'; Édouard 32'; Claude-Maurice 66' | Report |

Estadio Municipal de Concepción, Concepción
Attendance: 13,759
Referee: Janny Sikazwe (Zambia)
25 October 2015
16:00

| Paraguay | 1–2 | New Zealand |
|---|---|---|
| Ñamandú 43' | Report | Ashworth 11'; Imrie 90+1' |

Estadio Regional de Chinquihue, Puerto Montt
Attendance: 6,571
Referee: Yevhen Aranovskiy (Ukraine)

=== Ranking of third-placed teams ===
The four best ranked third-placed teams also advance to the round of 16. They are paired with the winners of groups A, B, C and D, according to a table published in Section 18 of the tournament regulations.

| Pos | Grp | Team | Pld | W | D | L | GF | GA | GD | Pts | Group stage result |
|---|---|---|---|---|---|---|---|---|---|---|---|
| 1 | A | Chile | 3 | 1 | 1 | 1 | 6 | 7 | −1 | 4 | Advanced to knockout stage |
| 2 | E | North Korea | 3 | 1 | 1 | 1 | 3 | 4 | −1 | 4 | Advanced to knockout stage |
| 3 | D | Belgium | 3 | 1 | 1 | 1 | 2 | 3 | −1 | 4 | Advanced to knockout stage |
| 4 | C | Australia | 3 | 1 | 1 | 1 | 3 | 5 | −2 | 4 | Advanced to knockout stage |
| 5 | F | Paraguay | 3 | 1 | 0 | 2 | 8 | 7 | +1 | 3 | |
| 6 | B | England | 3 | 0 | 2 | 1 | 1 | 2 | −1 | 2 | |

Source: FIFA
Rules for classification: 1) points; 2) goal difference; 3) number of goals scored; 4) Fair play points; 5) lots drawn by FIFA.

== Knockout stage ==
In the knockout stages, if a match is level at the end of normal playing time, the match is determined by a penalty shoot-out (no extra time is played).

=== Bracket ===
Round of 16
29 October — Concepción
Croatia | 2
Germany | 0
29 October — Talca
Mali | 3
North Korea | 0
28 October — Coquimbo
South Korea | 0
Belgium | 2
29 October — Puerto Montt
France | 0 (3)
Costa Rica (pen.) | 0 (5)
29 October — Concepción
Russia | 1
Ecuador | 4
28 October — Chillán
Mexico | 4
Chile | 1
28 October — Viña del Mar
Brazil | 1
New Zealand | 0
28 October — Viña del Mar
Nigeria | 6
Australia | 0

Quarter-finals
1 November — Chillán
Croatia | 0
Mali | 1
2 November — Concepción
Belgium | 1
Costa Rica | 0
2 November — Coquimbo
Ecuador | 0
Mexico | 2
1 November — Viña del Mar
Brazil | 0
Nigeria | 3

Semi-finals
5 November — La Serena
Mali | 3
Belgium | 1
5 November — Concepción
Mexico | 2
Nigeria | 4

Final
8 November — Viña del Mar
Mali | 0
Nigeria | 2
Third place
8 November — Viña del Mar
Belgium | 3
Mexico | 2

=== Combinations of matches in the Round of 16 ===
The third-placed teams advanced to the round of 16 were placed with the winners of groups A, B, C and D according to a table published in Section 18 of the tournament regulations.

Combination according to the four qualified teams

| Third teams qualify from groups: | 1A plays against: | 1B plays against: | 1C plays against: | 1D plays against: |
|---|---|---|---|---|
| A B C D | 3C | 3D | 3A | 3B |
| A B C E | 3C | 3A | 3B | 3E |
| A B C F | 3C | 3A | 3B | 3F |
| A B D E | 3D | 3A | 3B | 3E |
| A B D F | 3D | 3A | 3B | 3F |
| A B E F | 3E | 3A | 3B | 3F |
| A C D E | 3C | 3D | 3A | 3E |
| A C D F | 3C | 3D | 3A | 3F |
| A C E F | 3C | 3A | 3F | 3E |
| A D E F | 3D | 3A | 3F | 3E |
| B C D E | 3C | 3D | 3B | 3E |
| B C D F | 3C | 3D | 3B | 3F |
| B C E F | 3E | 3C | 3B | 3F |
| B D E F | 3E | 3D | 3B | 3F |
| C D E F | 3C | 3D | 3F | 3E |

=== Round of 16 ===
28 October 2015
17:00

| Brazil | 1–0 | New Zealand |
|---|---|---|
| Luís Henrique 90+6' (pen.) | Report |

Estadio Sausalito, Viña del Mar
Attendance: 4,265
Referee: Mohd Amirul Izwan Yaacob (Malaysia)

28 October 2015
17:00

| Mexico | 4–1 | Chile |
|---|---|---|
| Zamudio 42'; López 61'; Aguirre 69'; Cortés 90+3' | Report | B. Leiva 40' |

Estadio Municipal Nelson Oyarzún Arenas, Chillán
Attendance: 10,700
Referee: Michael Oliver (England)

28 October 2015
20:00

| Nigeria | 6–0 | Australia |
|---|---|---|
| Osimhen 22', 73', 79'; Nwakali 25' (pen.); Essien 86'; Chukwueze 88' | Report |

Estadio Sausalito, Viña del Mar
Attendance: 4,265
Referee: Roberto Tobar (Chile)

28 October 2015
20:00

| South Korea | 0–2 | Belgium |
|---|---|---|
| | Report | Vancamp 11'; Verreth 67' |

Estadio La Portada, La Serena
Attendance: 6,388
Referee: Malang Diedhiou (Senegal)

29 October 2015
17:00

| Croatia | 2–0 | Germany |
|---|---|---|
| Moro 18'; Lovren 90+1' | Report |

Estadio Municipal de Concepción, Concepción
Attendance: 10,705
Referee: Martin Strömbergsson (Sweden)

29 October 2015
17:00

| Mali | 3–0 | North Korea |
|---|---|---|
| A. Haidara 8'; Maïga 37', 48' | Report |

Estadio Fiscal de Talca, Talca
Attendance: 5,123
Referee: Héctor Rodríguez (Honduras)

29 October 2015
20:00

| Russia | 1–4 | Ecuador |
|---|---|---|
| Chalov 16' | Report | Pereira 3', 65'; Corozo 17'; Nazareno 78' |

Estadio Municipal de Concepción, Concepción
Attendance: 10,705
Referee: Abdulla Hassan Mohamed (United Arab Emirates)

29 October 2015
20:00

| France | 0–0 | Costa Rica |
|---|---|---|
| | Report |
Penalties
| Édouard (penalty scored); Cognat (penalty missed); Reine-Adélaïde (penalty scored); Boutobba (penalty scored) | 3–5 | (penalty scored) Córdoba; (penalty scored) Juárez; (penalty scored) Arboine; (penalty scored) Villegas; (penalty scored) Reyes |

Estadio Regional de Chinquihue, Puerto Montt
Attendance: 8,691
Referee: Wilson Lamouroux (Colombia)

=== Quarter-finals ===
1 November 2015
16:00

| Brazil | 0–3 | Nigeria |
|---|---|---|
| | Report | Osimhen 29'; Michael 30'; Anumudu 34' |

Estadio Sausalito, Viña del Mar
Attendance: 5,880
Referee: Matej Jug (Slovenia)

1 November 2015
19:00

| Croatia | 0–1 | Mali |
|---|---|---|
| | Report | Koita 20' |

Estadio Municipal Nelson Oyarzún Arenas, Chillán
Attendance: 5,222
Referee: Enrique Cáceres (Paraguay)

2 November 2015
17:00

| Ecuador | 0–2 | Mexico |
|---|---|---|
| | Report | Zamudio 41'; Salazar 55' (pen.) |

Estadio Municipal Francisco Sánchez Rumoroso, Coquimbo
Attendance: 3,127
Referee: Ruddy Buquet (France)

2 November 2015
20:00

| Belgium | 1–0 | Costa Rica |
|---|---|---|
| Rigo 27' | Report |

Estadio Municipal de Concepción, Concepción
Attendance: 8,874
Referee: Janny Sikazwe (Zambia)

=== Semi-finals ===
5 November 2015
17:00

| Mali | 3–1 | Belgium |
|---|---|---|
| B. Traoré 22'; Maïga 55'; Koita 85' | Report | Rigo 16' |

Estadio La Portada, La Serena
Attendance: 6,395
Referee: Roberto Tobar (Chile)

5 November 2015
20:00

| Mexico | 2–4 | Nigeria |
|---|---|---|
| Magaña 7'; Cortés 59' | Report | Nwakali 35'; Okwonkwo 43'; Ebere 67'; Osimhen 83' (pen.) |

Estadio Municipal de Concepción, Concepción
Attendance: 21,618
Referee: Abdulla Hassan Mohamed (United Arab Emirates)

=== Third place match ===
8 November 2015
16:00

| Belgium | 3–2 | Mexico |
|---|---|---|
| Van Vaerenbergh 54'; Vanzeir 73', 90+3' | Report | Marín 58' (pen.); Venegas 88' |

Estadio Sausalito, Viña del Mar
Attendance: 15,235
Referee: Abdulrahman Al-Jassim (Qatar)

=== Final ===
8 November 2015
19:00

| Mali | 0–2 | Nigeria |
|---|---|---|
| | Report | Osimhen 56'; Bamgboye 59' |

Estadio Sausalito, Viña del Mar
Attendance: 15,235
Referee: Michael Oliver (England)

== Awards ==
The following awards were given at the conclusion of the tournament. They were all sponsored by Adidas.

| Golden Ball | Silver Ball | Bronze Ball |
|---|---|---|
| (Nigeria) Kelechi Nwakali | (Nigeria) Victor Osimhen | (Mali) Aly Malle |
| Golden Boot | Silver Boot | Bronze Boot |
| (Nigeria) Victor Osimhen | (Germany) Johannes Eggestein | (Nigeria) Samuel Chukwueze |
| 10 goals (2 assists) | 4 goals (0 assists) | 3 goals (3 assists) |
Golden Glove
(Mali) Samuel Diarra
FIFA Fair Play Award
Ecuador

In December 2015, Nigerian Samuel Chukwueze was retroactively awarded the Bronze boot award. Kelechi Nwakali had erroneously been awarded the award immediately following the tournament but as he had played more minutes (630) than Chukwueze (535) in the tournament the award was re-allocated.

== Final ranking ==
As per statistical convention in football, matches decided in extra time are counted as wins and losses, while matches decided by penalty shoot-outs are counted as draws.

| Pos | Team | Pld | W | D | L | GF | GA | GD | Pts | Final result |
|---|---|---|---|---|---|---|---|---|---|---|
| 1 | Nigeria | 7 | 6 | 0 | 1 | 23 | 5 | +18 | 18 | Champions |
| 2 | Mali | 7 | 5 | 1 | 1 | 12 | 4 | +8 | 16 | Runners-up |
| 3 | Belgium | 7 | 4 | 1 | 2 | 9 | 8 | +1 | 13 | Third place |
| 4 | Mexico | 7 | 4 | 1 | 2 | 14 | 9 | +5 | 13 | Fourth place |
| 5 | Ecuador | 5 | 3 | 0 | 2 | 10 | 6 | +4 | 9 | Eliminated in Quarter-finals |
| 6 | Brazil | 5 | 3 | 0 | 2 | 5 | 5 | 0 | 9 | Eliminated in Quarter-finals |
| 7 | Croatia | 5 | 2 | 2 | 1 | 7 | 5 | +2 | 8 | Eliminated in Quarter-finals |
| 8 | Costa Rica | 5 | 1 | 2 | 2 | 4 | 5 | −1 | 5 | Eliminated in Quarter-finals |
| 9 | France | 4 | 3 | 1 | 0 | 14 | 4 | +10 | 10 | Eliminated in Round of 16 |
| 10 | Russia | 4 | 2 | 1 | 1 | 6 | 5 | +1 | 7 | Eliminated in Round of 16 |
| 11 | South Korea | 4 | 2 | 1 | 1 | 2 | 2 | 0 | 7 | Eliminated in Round of 16 |
| 12 | Germany | 4 | 2 | 0 | 2 | 9 | 5 | +4 | 6 | Eliminated in Round of 16 |
| 13 | Chile (H) | 4 | 1 | 1 | 2 | 7 | 11 | −4 | 4 | Eliminated in Round of 16 |
| 14 | North Korea | 4 | 1 | 1 | 2 | 3 | 7 | −4 | 4 | Eliminated in Round of 16 |
| 15 | New Zealand | 4 | 1 | 1 | 2 | 3 | 8 | −5 | 4 | Eliminated in Round of 16 |
| 16 | Australia | 4 | 1 | 1 | 2 | 3 | 11 | −8 | 4 | Eliminated in Round of 16 |
| 17 | Paraguay | 3 | 1 | 0 | 2 | 8 | 7 | +1 | 3 | Eliminated in Group stage |
| 18 | England | 3 | 0 | 2 | 1 | 1 | 2 | −1 | 2 | Eliminated in Group stage |
| 19 | South Africa | 3 | 0 | 1 | 2 | 2 | 5 | −3 | 1 | Eliminated in Group stage |
| 19 | Guinea | 3 | 0 | 1 | 2 | 2 | 5 | −3 | 1 | Eliminated in Group stage |
| 21 | United States | 3 | 0 | 1 | 2 | 3 | 8 | −5 | 1 | Eliminated in Group stage |
| 22 | Syria | 3 | 0 | 1 | 2 | 1 | 8 | −7 | 1 | Eliminated in Group stage |
| 23 | Honduras | 3 | 0 | 0 | 3 | 2 | 8 | −6 | 0 | Eliminated in Group stage |
| 24 | Argentina | 3 | 0 | 0 | 3 | 1 | 8 | −7 | 0 | Eliminated in Group stage |

Source: Techn Report p. 81
(H) Hosts

== Goalscorers ==
10 goals

- (Nigeria) Victor Osimhen

4 goals

- (Germany) Johannes Eggestein

3 goals

- (Belgium) Dante Rigo
- (Mali) Sidiki Maïga
- (Mexico) Francisco Venegas
- (Nigeria) Kelechi Nwakali
- (Nigeria) Samuel Chukwueze
- (Russia) Fyodor Chalov

2 goals

- (Australia) Nicholas Panetta
- (Belgium) Jorn Vancamp
- (Belgium) Dante Vanzeir
- (Brazil) Leandro
- (Chile) Marcelo Allende
- (Croatia) Karlo Majić
- (Croatia) Nikola Moro
- (Ecuador) Washington Corozo
- (Ecuador) Pervis Estupiñán
- (Ecuador) Yeison Guerrero
- (Ecuador) Jhon Pereira
- (France) Bilal Boutobba
- (France) Odsonne Edouard
- (France) Jonathan Ikoné
- (France) Nicolas Janvier
- (Germany) Vitaly Janelt
- (Germany) Felix Passlack
- (Mali) Amadou Haidara
- (Mali) Sekou Koita
- (Mali) Aly Malle
- (Mali) Boubacar Traoré
- (Mexico) Pablo López
- (Mexico) Claudio Zamudio
- (Mexico) Diego Cortés
- (Mexico) Kevin Magaña
- (Paraguay) Julio Villalba
- (Russia) Georgi Makhatadze
- (United States) Brandon Vazquez

1 goal

- (Argentina) Tomás Conechny
- (Australia) Pierce Waring
- (Belgium) Dennis Van Vaerenbergh
- (Belgium) Matthias Verreth
- (Brazil) Arthur
- (Brazil) Lincoln
- (Brazil) Luís Henrique
- (Chile) Gonzalo Jara
- (Chile) Brian Leiva
- (Chile) Yerko Leiva
- (Chile) Gabriel Mazuela
- (Chile) Camilo Moya
- (Costa Rica) Kevin Masís
- (Costa Rica) Diego Mesén
- (Costa Rica) Sergio Ramírez
- (Costa Rica) Andy Reyes
- (Croatia) Josip Brekalo
- (Croatia) Luka Ivanušec
- (Croatia) Davor Lovren
- (Ecuador) Joan Cortez
- (Ecuador) Juan Nazareno
- (England) Kaylen Hinds
- (France) Alexis Claude-Maurice
- (France) Mamadou Doucoure
- (France) Alec Georgen
- (France) Faitout Maouassa
- (France) Dayot Upamecano
- (Germany) Niklas Schmidt
- (Guinea) Naby Bangoura
- (Guinea) Morlaye Sylla
- (Honduras) Foslyn Grant
- (Honduras) Jafeth Leiva
- (Mali) Abdoul Karim Danté
- (Mexico) Eduardo Aguirre
- (Mexico) Ricardo Marín
- (Mexico) Bryan Salazar
- (New Zealand) Hunter Ashworth
- (New Zealand) Lucas Imrie
- (New Zealand) James McGarry
- (Nigeria) Udochukwu Anumudu
- (Nigeria) Chukwudi Agor
- (Nigeria) Funsho Bamgboye
- (Nigeria) Christian Ebere
- (Nigeria) Edidiong Essien
- (Nigeria) Kingsley Michael
- (Nigeria) Orji Okwonkwo
- (North Korea) Jong Chang-bom
- (North Korea) Kim Wi-song
- (North Korea) Pak Yong-gwan
- (Paraguay) Arturo Aranda
- (Paraguay) David Colmán
- (Paraguay) Sebastián Ferreira
- (Paraguay) Jorge Morel
- (Paraguay) Marcelino Ñamandú
- (Paraguay) Cristian Paredes
- (Russia) Ivan Galanin
- (South Korea) Jang Jae-won
- (South Korea) Oh Se-hun
- (South Africa) Khanyisa Mayo
- (South Africa) Thendo Mukumela
- (Syria) Anas Al-Aji
- (United States) Christian Pulisic

1 own goal

- (New Zealand) James McGarry (playing against France)

== Marketing ==
=== Sponsorship ===
FIFA partners

- Adidas
- Coca-Cola
- Gazprom
- Visa
- Hyundai

National suppliers

- Clinica MEDS
- Movistar Chile
- Pullman Bus
- Universidad Santo Tomás
- VTR

=== Mascot and anthem ===
The official mascot, a young boy named Brochico, and anthem, composed by DJ Méndez, were unveiled on 9 July 2015.

== Broadcasting ==
=== United States ===
Fox Sports: English language, Telemundo: Spanish language

=== Bulgaria ===
BNT

=== Canada ===
TSN.

=== Germany ===
ARD and ZDF.

=== Indonesia ===
Rajawali Televisi

=== Laos ===
TVLAO

=== United Kingdom ===
BBC, ITV, Eurosport.

=== New Zealand ===
Sky Sport

=== South Africa, Sub Sahara Africa and Nigeria ===
Startimes Sports

=== South Korea ===
SBS, KBS, and MBC
