= 2018–19 TFF 1. Lig =

TFF 1. Lig
- Season: 2018–19
- Champions: Denizlispor
- Promoted: Denizlispor; Gençlerbirliği; Gaziantep
- Relegated: Afjet Afyonspor; Elazığspor; Kardemir Karabükspor
- Matches played: 306
- Goals scored: 804 (2.63 per match)
- Top goalscorer: Marco Paixão (29 goals)
- Biggest home win: G. Birliği 6–0 Karabük (1 December 2018); Altınordu 6–0 Karabük (2 February 2019); Balıkesir 7–1 Karabük (22 April 2019); Denizli 6–0 Karabük (12 May 2019)
- Biggest away win: İstanbul 0–5 Altay (25 August 2018); Karabük 1–6 Gazişehir (18 May 2019)
- Highest scoring: Balıkesir 7–1 Karabük (22 April 2019)
- Longest winning run: Osmanlıspor (10 matches)
- Longest unbeaten run: Altınordu; Denizlispor (14 matches)
- Longest winless run: Kardemir Karabükspor (13 matches)
- Longest losing run: Kardemir Karabükspor (34 matches)

The 2018–19 TFF 1. Lig is the 18th season since the league was established in 2001 and 56th season of the second-level football league of Turkey since its establishment in 1963–64.

== Teams ==
- Osmanlıspor, Gençlerbirliği and Kardemir Karabükspor relegated from 2017–18 Süper Lig.
- Rizespor, Ankaragücü and Erzurum BB promoted to 2018–19 Süper Lig.
- Altay, Hatayspor and Afjet Afyonspor promoted from 2017–18 TFF Second League.
- Samsunspor, Manisaspor and Gaziantepspor relegated to 2018–19 TFF Second League.

=== Stadiums and locations ===
Location of teams in TFF First Lig 2018–19

| Team | Home city | Stadium | Capacity |
|---|---|---|---|
| Adana Demirspor | Adana (Yüreğir) | Adana 5 Ocak Stadium | 14,805 |
| Adanaspor | Adana (Çukurova) | Adana 5 Ocak Stadium | 14,805 |
| Afjet Afyonspor | Afyonkarahisar | Afyonkarahisar Stadi | 15,450 |
| Altay | İzmir (Gaziemir) | İzmir Atatürk Stadium | 51,295 |
| Altınordu | İzmir (Karabağlar) | Doğanlar Stadium | 12,500 |
| Balıkesirspor | Balıkesir | Balıkesir Atatürk Stadium | 15,800 |
| Boluspor | Bolu | Bolu Atatürk Stadium | 9,000 |
| Denizlispor | Denizli | Denizli Atatürk Stadium | 15,500 |
| Elazığspor | Elazığ | Elazığ Atatürk Stadium | 13,923 |
| Eskişehirspor | Eskişehir | New Eskişehir Stadium | 34,930 |
| Gazişehir Gaziantep | Gaziantep | Kalyon Stadium | 35,558 |
| Gençlerbirliği | Ankara (Yenimahalle) | Eryaman Stadium | 20,000 |
| Giresunspor | Giresun | Giresun Atatürk Stadium | 12,191 |
| Hatayspor | Hatay | Antakya Atatürk Stadium | 6,015 |
| İstanbulspor | Istanbul (Büyükçekmece) | Necmi Kadıoğlu Stadium | 4,491 |
| Kardemir Karabükspor | Karabük | Necmettin Şeyhoğlu Stadium | 15,000 |
| Osmanlıspor | Ankara (Sincan) | Osmanlı Stadium | 20,000 |
| Ümraniyespor | Istanbul (Ümraniye) | Ümraniye Belediyesi Şehir Stadium | 1,601 |

=== Foreign players ===
| Club | Player 1 | Player 2 | Player 3 | Player 4 | Player 5 | Player 6 | Player 7 | Player 8 | Player 9 | Player 10 | Former Players |
|---|---|---|---|---|---|---|---|---|---|---|---|
| Adana Demirspor | (Belgium) Jonathan Legear | (Benin) Mickaël Poté | (Brazil) Anderson | (Democratic Republic of the Congo) Hervé Kage | (Mali) Hamidou Traoré | (Poland) Jakub Kosecki | (Senegal) Joher Rassoul | (Serbia) Milan Mitrović | (Ukraine) Oleksandr Hladkyi | | (Mali) Boubacar Traoré (Mali) Djemoussa Traore |
| Adanaspor | (Bosnia and Herzegovina) Goran Karačić | (Brazil) Digão | (Brazil) Renan Diniz | (Hungary) Róbert Feczesin | (Mali) Famoussa Koné | (Mali) Moussa Bagayoko | (Romania) Claudiu Bumba | | | | (Brazil) Didi (Brazil) Renan Foguinho |
| Afjet Afyonspor | (Kosovo) Bajram Ajeti | (Senegal) Théo Mendy | | | | | | | | | (Albania) Renato Arapi (Brazil) Danilo Alves (Ukraine) Oleksandr Rybka |
| Altay | (Belarus) Anton Putsila | (Bulgaria) Ivan Ivanov | (Cape Verde) Hélder Tavares | (Greece) Andreas Tatos | (Netherlands) Leandro Kappel | (Portugal) Marco Paixão | | | | | (Croatia) Adnan Aganović (Portugal) Pedro Eugénio (Senegal) Mohamed Daf |
| Altınordu | | | | | | | | | | | |
| Balıkesirspor | (Cameroon) Steve Beleck | (Central African Republic) Foxi Kéthévoama | (Croatia) Andrija Vuković | (Croatia) Tomislav Glumac | (Ghana) Mahatma Otoo | | | | | | |
| Boluspor | (Algeria) Billal Sebaihi | (Bulgaria) Daniel Dimov | (Nigeria) Chukwuma Akabueze | (Senegal) Mamadou Diarra | (Serbia) Vukadin Vukadinović | (Slovenia) Matic Fink | | | | | (Cameroon) Franck Etoundi |
| Denizlispor | (Cameroon) Marc Mbamba | (Morocco) Bilal Ould-Chikh | (Morocco) Ismaïl Aissati | (Nigeria) Lanre Kehinde | (Poland) Adam Stachowiak | | | | | | (Liberia) Tonia Tisdell |
| Elazığspor | (Cameroon) Bekamenga | (Greece) Georgios Georgiadis | (Guinea-Bissau) Abel Camará | (Mali) Boubacar Traoré | (Mali) Idrissa Diarra | (Mauritania) Diallo Guidileye | (Senegal) Lamine Diarra | (Togo) Serge Akakpo | | | (Greece) Andreas Tatos (Iceland) Elmar Bjarnason (Mali) Moussa Bagayoko |
| Eskişehirspor | (Ghana) Bennett Ofori | (Ghana) Kamal Issah | (Ivory Coast) Ibrahim Sissoko | (Nigeria) Jesse Sekidika | (Serbia) Marko Milinković | | | | | | (Brazil) Bruno Mezenga (North Macedonia) Erdon Daci (Romania) Cristian Tănase |
| Gazişehir Gaziantep | (Austria) Seifedin Chabbi | (Brazil) Igor | (Brazil) Jefferson | (Iceland) Elmar Bjarnason | (Netherlands) Rydell Poepon | (Senegal) Moussa Sow | (Togo) Prince Segbefia | (Venezuela) Yonathan Del Valle | | | (Nigeria) Femi Balogun |
| Gençlerbirliği | (Benin) Stéphane Sessègnon | (Brazil) Bady | (Brazil) Jaílton Paraíba | (Brazil) Luccas Claro | (Iceland) Kári Árnason | (Romania) Bogdan Stancu | (Romania) Cosmin Matei | | | | (Serbia) Marko Milinković |
| Giresunspor | (Brazil) Renan Foguinho | (France) Ibrahim Sangaré | (Guinea) Guy-Michel Landel | (Ivory Coast) Cyriac | (Mali) Djemoussa Traore | (Martinique) Guy-Michel Landel | (Mauritania) Adama Ba | (Nigeria) Abiola Dauda | (Romania) Cristian Tănase | (Serbia) Miljan Škrbić | (Morocco) Saïd Idazza (North Macedonia) Zeni Husmani |
| Hatayspor | (Brazil) Tom | (Ghana) Joseph Akomadi | (Mali) Bakary Nimaga | (Mali) Hamidou Maiga | (Senegal) Sadio Diallo | (Senegal) Samb El-Hadji | (Ukraine) Dmytro Korkishko | | | | (Mali) Oumar Sidibé |
| İstanbulspor | (Bosnia and Herzegovina) Aldin Čajić | (Brazil) Wellington | (Cameroon) Patrick Etoga | (Ghana) Mohamed Sammmed | (Mozambique) Clésio | (Serbia) Slavko Perović | | | | | (Ghana) Jerry Akaminko |
| Kardemir Karabükspor | | | | | | | | | | | (France) Mohamadou Sissoko (Ghana) Francis Narh (Romania) Marius Alexe (Ukraine) Andriy Bliznichenko |
| Osmanlıspor | (Belgium) Tortol Lumanza | (Bosnia and Herzegovina) Ognjen Todorović | (Cameroon) Eric Ayuk | (France) Magaye Gueye | (French Guiana) Sloan Privat | (Lithuania) Žydrūnas Karčemarskas | (Nigeria) Ifeanyi Mathew | (Senegal) Ousmane N'Diaye | (Serbia) Jovan Blagojević | (Uruguay) Santiago Mele | (Albania) Sokol Cikalleshi (Iran) Payam Sadeghian (Mali) Cheick Diabaté (Morocco) Adrien Regattin |
| Ümraniyespor | (Brazil) Leandrinho | (Gabon) Aaron Appindangoyé | (Gabon) Lévy Madinda | (Greece) Andreas Vasilogiannis | (Senegal) Boubacar Dialiba | | | | | | |

== League table ==
| Pos | Team | Pld | W | D | L | GF | GA | GD | Pts | Qualification or relegation |
|---|---|---|---|---|---|---|---|---|---|---|
| 1 | Denizlispor (C, P) | 34 | 21 | 9 | 4 | 67 | 32 | +35 | 72 | Promotion to the Süper Lig |
| 2 | Gençlerbirliği (P) | 34 | 22 | 4 | 8 | 50 | 28 | +22 | 70 | Promotion to the Süper Lig |
| 3 | Hatayspor | 34 | 19 | 10 | 5 | 57 | 22 | +35 | 67 | Qualification for the Süper Lig Playoffs |
| 4 | Osmanlıspor | 34 | 19 | 5 | 10 | 49 | 26 | +23 | 62 | Qualification for the Süper Lig Playoffs |
| 5 | Gazişehir Gaziantep (P) | 34 | 17 | 8 | 9 | 60 | 31 | +29 | 59 | Qualification for the Süper Lig Playoffs |
| 6 | Adana Demirspor | 34 | 17 | 7 | 10 | 50 | 36 | +14 | 58 | Qualification for the Süper Lig Playoffs |
| 7 | Altınordu | 34 | 16 | 9 | 9 | 50 | 33 | +17 | 57 | |
| 8 | Ümraniyespor | 34 | 14 | 11 | 9 | 44 | 37 | +7 | 53 | |
| 9 | Boluspor | 34 | 14 | 7 | 13 | 41 | 41 | 0 | 49 | |
| 10 | Altay | 34 | 12 | 11 | 11 | 52 | 40 | +12 | 47 | |
| 11 | İstanbulspor | 34 | 10 | 13 | 11 | 45 | 46 | −1 | 43 | |
| 12 | Adanaspor | 34 | 9 | 10 | 15 | 41 | 49 | −8 | 37 | |
| 13 | Giresunspor | 34 | 8 | 12 | 14 | 32 | 41 | −9 | 36 | |
| 14 | Eskişehirspor | 34 | 9 | 8 | 17 | 44 | 66 | −22 | 35 | |
| 15 | Balıkesirspor (Note: Balıkesirspor have been deducted 6 points.) | 34 | 11 | 7 | 16 | 36 | 45 | −9 | 34 | |
| 16 | Afjet Afyonspor (R) | 34 | 7 | 9 | 18 | 38 | 55 | −17 | 30 | Relegation to the TFF Second League |
| 17 | Elazığspor (R) | 34 | 6 | 7 | 21 | 38 | 64 | −26 | 25 | Relegation to the TFF Second League |
| 18 | Kardemir Karabükspor (Note: Kardemir Karabükspor have been deducted 3 points.) (R) | 34 | 0 | 3 | 31 | 10 | 112 | −102 | 0 | Relegation to the TFF Second League |

Source: TFF
Rules for classification: 1) Points; 2) Head-to-head points; 3) Head-to-head goal difference; 4) Head-to-head goals scored; 5) Goal difference; 6) Goals scored
(C) Champions; (P) Promoted; (R) Relegated

=== Positions by round ===
The table lists the positions of teams after each week of matches. In order to preserve chronological evolvements, any postponed matches are not included to the round at which they were originally scheduled, but added to the full round they were played immediately afterwards.

| Team ╲ Round | 1 | 2 | 3 | 4 | 5 | 6 | 7 | 8 | 9 | 10 | 11 | 12 | 13 | 14 | 15 | 16 | 17 | 18 | 19 | 20 | 21 | 22 | 23 | 24 | 25 | 26 | 27 | 28 | 29 | 30 | 31 | 32 | 33 | 34 |
|---|---|---|---|---|---|---|---|---|---|---|---|---|---|---|---|---|---|---|---|---|---|---|---|---|---|---|---|---|---|---|---|---|---|---|
| Denizlispor | 13 | 10 | 9 | 13 | 9 | 6 | 4 | 7 | 4 | 3 | 3 | 3 | 2 | 2 | 2 | 2 | 2 | 2 | 1 | 1 | 1 | 1 | 2 | 1 | 1 | 1 | 1 | 1 | 2 | 2 | 2 | 2 | 2 | 1 |
| Gençlerbirliği | 7 | 3 | 1 | 1 | 1 | 1 | 1 | 1 | 1 | 1 | 1 | 1 | 1 | 1 | 1 | 1 | 1 | 1 | 2 | 2 | 3 | 3 | 3 | 2 | 2 | 2 | 2 | 2 | 1 | 1 | 1 | 1 | 1 | 2 |
| Hatayspor | 14 | 7 | 7 | 12 | 14 | 10 | 12 | 10 | 10 | 7 | 8 | 7 | 7 | 9 | 9 | 6 | 5 | 3 | 3 | 5 | 5 | 6 | 5 | 5 | 5 | 4 | 4 | 3 | 3 | 3 | 3 | 3 | 3 | 3 |
| Osmanlıspor | 16 | 17 | 11 | 15 | 10 | 11 | 9 | 8 | 7 | 10 | 10 | 10 | 9 | 8 | 8 | 7 | 6 | 4 | 4 | 3 | 2 | 2 | 1 | 3 | 3 | 3 | 3 | 4 | 5 | 4 | 4 | 5 | 4 | 4 |
| Gazişehir Gaziantep | 6 | 6 | 8 | 6 | 4 | 5 | 7 | 5 | 6 | 5 | 5 | 5 | 4 | 3 | 3 | 3 | 3 | 5 | 6 | 7 | 6 | 7 | 7 | 6 | 6 | 5 | 5 | 5 | 4 | 5 | 5 | 4 | 6 | 5 |
| Adana Demirspor | 3 | 9 | 5 | 5 | 3 | 3 | 3 | 3 | 3 | 6 | 6 | 6 | 6 | 6 | 7 | 9 | 9 | 9 | 9 | 9 | 9 | 9 | 8 | 8 | 8 | 8 | 8 | 6 | 7 | 7 | 6 | 7 | 7 | 6 |
| Altınordu | 10 | 15 | 13 | 8 | 12 | 14 | 13 | 14 | 12 | 9 | 7 | 8 | 8 | 7 | 6 | 8 | 8 | 7 | 7 | 6 | 7 | 5 | 6 | 7 | 7 | 6 | 6 | 8 | 8 | 8 | 7 | 6 | 5 | 7 |
| Ümraniyespor | 17 | 8 | 12 | 7 | 7 | 8 | 6 | 4 | 5 | 4 | 4 | 4 | 5 | 5 | 4 | 4 | 4 | 6 | 5 | 4 | 4 | 4 | 4 | 4 | 4 | 7 | 7 | 7 | 6 | 6 | 8 | 8 | 8 | 8 |
| Boluspor | 5 | 2 | 3 | 2 | 2 | 2 | 2 | 2 | 2 | 2 | 2 | 2 | 3 | 4 | 5 | 5 | 7 | 8 | 8 | 8 | 8 | 8 | 9 | 9 | 9 | 9 | 9 | 9 | 9 | 9 | 9 | 9 | 9 | 9 |
| Altay | 4 | 5 | 4 | 4 | 5 | 7 | 8 | 11 | 9 | 12 | 13 | 11 | 11 | 13 | 13 | 14 | 14 | 12 | 12 | 12 | 11 | 11 | 11 | 10 | 11 | 10 | 10 | 10 | 10 | 10 | 10 | 10 | 10 | 10 |
| İstanbulspor | 2 | 4 | 10 | 10 | 11 | 13 | 15 | 15 | 14 | 15 | 12 | 13 | 12 | 10 | 11 | 12 | 12 | 13 | 13 | 13 | 13 | 13 | 13 | 13 | 13 | 13 | 13 | 12 | 11 | 12 | 12 | 11 | 11 | 11 |
| Adanaspor | 8 | 13 | 15 | 16 | 16 | 17 | 14 | 12 | 13 | 11 | 11 | 12 | 14 | 14 | 14 | 11 | 11 | 11 | 11 | 11 | 12 | 12 | 12 | 12 | 12 | 12 | 12 | 13 | 13 | 13 | 14 | 14 | 12 | 12 |
| Giresunspor | 1 | 1 | 2 | 3 | 6 | 4 | 5 | 6 | 8 | 8 | 9 | 9 | 10 | 11 | 12 | 13 | 13 | 14 | 14 | 14 | 15 | 15 | 15 | 15 | 14 | 14 | 14 | 14 | 15 | 15 | 15 | 15 | 15 | 13 |
| Eskişehirspor | 18 | 16 | 18 | 14 | 15 | 15 | 16 | 16 | 17 | 16 | 15 | 16 | 16 | 17 | 16 | 17 | 16 | 15 | 16 | 15 | 14 | 14 | 14 | 14 | 16 | 16 | 16 | 15 | 14 | 14 | 13 | 13 | 13 | 14 |
| Balıkesirspor | 11 | 11 | 14 | 9 | 13 | 12 | 10 | 13 | 15 | 14 | 16 | 14 | 13 | 12 | 10 | 10 | 10 | 10 | 10 | 10 | 10 | 10 | 10 | 11 | 10 | 11 | 11 | 11 | 12 | 11 | 11 | 12 | 14 | 15 |
| Afjet Afyonspor | 12 | 12 | 6 | 11 | 8 | 9 | 11 | 9 | 11 | 13 | 14 | 15 | 15 | 15 | 15 | 16 | 17 | 16 | 15 | 16 | 16 | 16 | 16 | 16 | 15 | 15 | 15 | 16 | 16 | 16 | 16 | 16 | 16 | 16 |
| Elazığspor | 9 | 14 | 16 | 17 | 17 | 16 | 17 | 17 | 16 | 17 | 17 | 17 | 17 | 16 | 17 | 15 | 15 | 17 | 17 | 17 | 17 | 17 | 17 | 17 | 17 | 17 | 17 | 17 | 17 | 17 | 17 | 17 | 17 | 17 |
| Kardemir Karabükspor | 15 | 18 | 17 | 18 | 18 | 18 | 18 | 18 | 18 | 18 | 18 | 18 | 18 | 18 | 18 | 18 | 18 | 18 | 18 | 18 | 18 | 18 | 18 | 18 | 18 | 18 | 18 | 18 | 18 | 18 | 18 | 18 | 18 | 18 |

| Champion, Promotion to Süper Lig |
| Promotion to Süper Lig |
| Play-off |
| TFF Second League |

Source: TFF

== Results ==
| Home \ Away | ADS | ADA | AFY | ALT | ATO | BAL | BOL | DEN | ELA | ESK | GFK | GEN | GRS | HAT | İST | KRB | OSM | ÜMR |
|---|---|---|---|---|---|---|---|---|---|---|---|---|---|---|---|---|---|---|
| Adana Demirspor | — | 1–1 | 1–0 | 2–2 | 3–0 | 2–0 | 4–1 | 0–1 | 0–1 | 4–0 | 3–2 | 2–3 | 1–1 | 3–0 | 2–2 | 1–0 | 0–0 | 3–1 |
| Adanaspor | | — | 0–2 | 2–3 | 1–2 | 2–1 | 1–2 | 3–4 | 1–1 | 2–0 | 1–1 | 0–1 | 1–1 | 0–0 | 1–1 | 4–0 | 1–4 | 1–2 |
| Afjet Afyonspor | 0–2 | 0–3 | — | 1–1 | 1–3 | 1–1 | 0–1 | 1–3 | 0–4 | 2–1 | 1–4 | 0–0 | 3–2 | 1–2 | 1–1 | 5–0 | 0–0 | 2–2 |
| Altay | 3–0 | 2–2 | 1–1 | — | 1–2 | 1–0 | 1–0 | 1–3 | 4–0 | 2–1 | 1–1 | 0–1 | 0–1 | 1–1 | 1–1 | 4–0 | 0–1 | 1–0 |
| Altınordu | 0–1 | 2–0 | 1–1 | 2–1 | — | 1–0 | | 4–0 | 3–2 | 2–0 | 1–0 | 1–2 | 0–0 | 2–2 | 1–1 | 6–0 | 0–3 | 1–2 |
| Balıkesirspor | 2–1 | 1–0 | 2–1 | 2–1 | 0–0 | — | 0–1 | 0–0 | 3–1 | 3–1 | 1–2 | 3–1 | 1–1 | 0–3 | 1–5 | 7–1 | 0–3 | 0–1 |
| Boluspor | 2–3 | 0–1 | 1–1 | 0–0 | 1–1 | 1–0 | — | 1–2 | 3–0 | 3–2 | 1–0 | 0–1 | 1–1 | 1–4 | 2–1 | 4–0 | 1–0 | 3–1 |
| Denizlispor | 5–1 | 4–2 | 3–0 | 3–3 | 1–0 | 0–0 | 0–0 | — | 3–0 | 4–1 | 0–1 | 0–0 | 3–2 | 0–0 | 1–0 | 6–0 | 0–2 | 0–0 |
| Elazığspor | 0–2 | 0–1 | 0–1 | 1–1 | 2–1 | 1–2 | 1–2 | 1–2 | — | 3–2 | 0–5 | 1–2 | 0–0 | 0–1 | 1–1 | 4–0 | 1–2 | 3–3 |
| Eskişehirspor | 1–2 | 0–3 | 3–1 | 1–0 | 2–4 | 2–2 | 1–1 | 1–1 | 3–1 | — | 0–0 | 3–2 | 0–0 | 0–3 | 1–0 | 2–0 | 1–0 | 2–2 |
| Gazişehir Gaziantep | 0–1 | 4–1 | 1–0 | 3–0 | 1–0 | 0–2 | 1–0 | 0–1 | 2–0 | 1–1 | — | | 2–2 | 2–0 | 1–1 | 6–1 | 2–3 | 0–0 |
| Gençlerbirliği | 1–2 | 0–0 | 1–0 | 1–0 | 0–2 | 1–0 | 1–1 | 0–3 | 3–1 | 5–0 | 2–1 | — | 1–0 | 1–0 | 1–0 | 6–0 | 0–2 | 2–1 |
| Giresunspor | 1–0 | 0–1 | 0–1 | 1–2 | 3–1 | 0–0 | 3–1 | 0–3 | 2–0 | 3–1 | 1–5 | 0–1 | — | 0–3 | 0–0 | 4–0 | 0–2 | 1–1 |
| Hatayspor | 1–1 | 4–1 | 2–0 | 1–1 | 1–1 | 3–0 | 2–0 | 1–1 | 3–1 | 4–0 | 0–1 | 3–1 | | — | 1–0 | 3–1 | 0–0 | 0–1 |
| İstanbulspor | 2–0 | 1–1 | 4–3 | 0–5 | 0–1 | 3–0 | 1–3 | 2–5 | 2–2 | 2–1 | 2–2 | 2–0 | 3–1 | 0–3 | — | 1–0 | 1–0 | 1–1 |
| Kardemir Karabükspor | 0–1 | 0–1 | 0–4 | 0–4 | 1–1 | 1–2 | 0–2 | 2–3 | 1–3 | 0–4 | 1–6 | 0–4 | 0–0 | 0–2 | 1–1 | — | 0–4 | 0–1 |
| Osmanlıspor | 1–0 | 3–1 | 3–2 | 3–1 | 0–1 | 1–0 | 3–1 | 0–2 | 1–1 | 2–4 | 0–1 | 0–1 | 0–1 | 1–3 | 1–0 | 3–0 | — | 0–0 |
| Ümraniyespor | 2–1 | 2–1 | 2–1 | 2–3 | 0–0 | 2–0 | 1–0 | 3–0 | 2–1 | 2–2 | 1–2 | 0–2 | 2–0 | 0–0 | 1–3 | 3–0 | 0–1 | — |

Source: TFF (in Turkish)
Legend: Blue = home team win; Yellow = draw; Red = away team win.
For upcoming matches, an "a" indicates there is an article about the rivalry between the two participants.

== Promotion play-offs ==
=== Semi-finals ===
| Team 1 | Agg. | Team 2 | 1st leg | 2nd leg |
|---|---|---|---|---|
| Adana Demirspor | 2–3 | Hatayspor | 0–0 | 2–3 |
| Gaziantep | 2–2 (9–8 p) | Osmanlıspor | 2–0 | 0–2 |

=== Final ===
| Team 1 | Score | Team 2 |
|---|---|---|
| Hatayspor | 1–1 (3–5 p) | Gaziantep |

== Statistics ==
=== Top goalscorers ===
"TFF 1. Lig Top scorers". TFF.

| Pos. | Player | Team | Goals |
|---|---|---|---|
| 1 | (Portugal) Marco Paixão | Altay | 29 |
| 2 | (Benin) Mickaël Poté | Adana Demirspor | 16 |
| 3 | (Turkey) Mehmet Akyüz | Denizlispor | 15 |
| 4 | (Turkey) Oltan Karakullukçu | Afjet Afyonspor | 14 |
| 5 | (Turkey) Recep Niyaz | Denizlispor | 12 |
| 6 | (Nigeria) Abiola Dauda | Giresunspor | 11 |
| 6 | (Turkey) Nadir Çiftçi | Gençlerbirliği | 11 |
| 6 | (Turkey) İbrahim Yılmaz | İstanbulspor | 11 |
| 9 | (Nigeria) Lanre Kehinde | Denizlispor | 10 |
| 9 | (Turkey) Ziya Alkurt | Denizlispor | 10 |

== See also ==
- 2018–19 Turkish Cup
- 2018–19 Süper Lig
- 2018–19 TFF Second League
- 2018–19 TFF Third League
