= 2014–15 in Croatian football =

Football in Croatia
- Season: 2014–15

Men's football
- Prva HNL: Dinamo Zagreb
- Druga HNL: Inter Zaprešić
- Treća HNL: Dinamo Zagreb II (West); Šibenik (South); Slavija Pleternica (East)
- Croatian Cup: Dinamo Zagreb
- Croatian Supercup: Rijeka

The following article presents a summary of the 2014–15 football season in Croatia, which is the 24th season of competitive football in the country.

== National teams ==
=== Croatia ===
Date	Venue	Opponents	Score	Croatia scorer(s)	Report
UEFA Euro 2016 qualifying - Group stage
9 September 2014	Stadion Maksimir, Zagreb	Malta	2–0	Modrić, Kramarić	UEFA.com
10 October 2014	Vasil Levski National Stadium, Sofia	Bulgaria	1–0	Bodurov (o.g.)	UEFA.com
13 October 2014	Stadion Gradski vrt, Osijek	Azerbaijan	6–0	Kramarić, Perišić (2), Brozović, Modrić, Sadygov (o.g.)	UEFA.com
16 November 2014	San Siro, Milan	Italy	1–1	Perišić	UEFA.com
28 March 2015	Stadion Maksimir, Zagreb	Norway	5–1	Brozović, Perišić, Olić, Schildenfeld, Pranjić	UEFA.com
12 June 2015	Stadion Poljud, Split	Italy	1–1	Mandžukić	UEFA.com
Friendly fixtures
4 September 2014	Stadion Aldo Drosina, Pula	Cyprus	2–0	Mandžukić (2)	HNS-CFF.hr
12 November 2014	Boleyn Ground, London	Argentina	1–2	Sharbini	HNS-CFF.hr
7 June 2015	Stadion Varteks, Varaždin	Gibraltar	4–0	Sharbini, Kovačić, Mandžukić, Kramarić	

=== Croatia U21 ===
Date	Venue	Opponents	Score	Croatia scorer(s)	Report
2015 UEFA European Under-21 Championship qualification - Group stage
3 September 2014	Zemgales Olympic Centre, Jelgava	Latvia	3–1	Bagarić, Rebić, Župarić	UEFA.com
2015 UEFA European Under-21 Championship qualification - Play-offs
10 October 2014	Molineux Stadium, Wolverhampton	England	1–2	Livaja	UEFA.com
14 October 2014	Stadion HNK Cibalia, Vinkovci	England	1–2	Livaja	UEFA.com
Friendly fixtures
13 August 2014	Gradski stadion, Sinj	Montenegro	0–0		HNS-CFF.hr
13 November 2014	Stadion Šubićevac, Šibenik	Norway	3–0	Pašalić, Ćaleta-Car, Šimunović	HNS-CFF.hr
26 March 2015	Stadion Sv. Josip Radnik, Sesvete	Montenegro	3–1	Perić, Mišić, Krovinović	HNS-CFF.hr
30 March 2015	Peristeri Stadium, Athens	Greece	2–0	Rog, Pašalić	HNS-CFF.hr

=== Croatia U19 ===
Date	Venue	Opponents	Score	Croatia scorer(s)	Report
2015 UEFA European Under-19 Championship qualification - Qualifying round
7 October 2014	Gradski stadion, Sinj	Estonia	1–0	Roguljić	UEFA.com
9 October 2014	Stadion Hrvatski vitezovi, Dugopolje	Iceland	4–1	Ćaleta-Car, Šunjić, Benković, Džalto	UEFA.com
12 October 2014	Stadion Šubićevac, Šibenik	Turkey	0–0		UEFA.com
2015 UEFA European Under-19 Championship qualification - Elite round
26 March 2015	Lindabrunn Stadium, Enzesfeld-Lindabrunn	Italy	2–2	Roguljić (2)	UEFA.com
28 March 2015	Stadion Wiener Neustadt, Wiener Neustadt	Austria	0–2		UEFA.com
31 March 2015	Lindabrunn Stadium, Enzesfeld-Lindabrunn	Scotland	1–1	Bašić	UEFA.com
Friendly fixtures
2 August 2014		Azerbaijan	0–1		HNS-CFF.hr
5 August 2014		Albania	0–1		HNS-CFF.hr
13 August 2014	Campo Comunale di Manzano, Manzano	Italy	2–1	Brodić, Roguljić	HNS-CFF.hr
10 September 2014	ŠRC Stanko Vlainić - Dida, Slavonski Brod	Bosnia and Herzegovina	1–1	Maloku	HNS-CFF.hr
12 September 2014	Stadion Goal, Orašje	Bosnia and Herzegovina	1–1	Klarić	HNS-CFF.hr
24 February 2015	Sportski centar NS Srbije, Stara Pazova	Serbia	2–4	Šunjić, Lulić	HNS-CFF.hr
26 February 2015	Sportski centar NS Srbije, Stara Pazova	Serbia	1–2	Šunjić	HNS-CFF.hr
26 May 2015	Aspire Dome, Doha	New Zealand	4–1	Matić (2), Mudražija, Džalto	HNS-CFF.hr

=== Croatia U17 ===
Date	Venue	Opponents	Score	Croatia scorer(s)	Report
2015 UEFA European Under-17 Championship qualification - Qualifying round
21 October 2014	Grosics Gyula Stadion, Tatabánya	Kazakhstan	8–1	Moro, Lovren (2), Brekalo (2), Sosa, Crnički (2)	UEFA.com
23 October 2014	Grosics Gyula Stadion, Tatabánya	Israel	0–0		UEFA.com
26 October 2014	Globall Football Park, Telki	Hungary	2–1	Lovren, Pasariček	UEFA.com
2015 UEFA European Under-17 Championship qualification - Elite round
17 March 2015	Bakcell Arena, Baku	Azerbaijan	4–0	Majić (2), Erlić, Blečić	UEFA.com
19 March 2015	Ismet Qaibov Stadium, Baku	Serbia	3–0	Moro, Brekalo, Blečić	UEFA.com
22 March 2015	Baku FC Stadium, Baku	Portugal	1–0	Moro	UEFA.com
2015 UEFA European Under-17 Championship - Group stage
6 May 2015	Beroe Stadium, Stara Zagora	Bulgaria	2–0	Babić, Blečić	UEFA.com
9 May 2015	Arena Sozopol, Sozopol	Austria	1–0	Lovren	UEFA.com
12 May 2015	Hadzhi Dimitar Stadium, Sliven	Spain	0–0		UEFA.com
2015 UEFA European Under-17 Championship - Knockout stage
15 May 2015	Lazur Stadium, Burgas	Belgium	1–1 (3–5 p)	Majić	UEFA.com
19 May 2015	Arena Sozopol, Sozopol	Italy	1–0	Moro	UEFA.com
Friendly fixtures
16 September 2014	Dinamovo igralište br. 3, Zagreb	Armenia	4–0	Soldo, Brekalo (2), Majić	HNS-CFF.hr
18 September 2014	Stadion Lučko, Zagreb	Armenia	4–1	Markota, Olujić, Kotlar, Brekalo	HNS-CFF.hr
24 February 2015	Dinamovo igralište br. 3, Zagreb	Republic of Ireland	4–3	Markota, Brekalo, Moro, Blečić	HNS-CFF.hr
26 February 2015	Dinamovo igralište br. 3, Zagreb	Republic of Ireland	2–1	Brekalo, Blečić	HNS-CFF.hr

== League tables ==
=== Prva HNL ===
Pos	Team	Pld	W	D	L	GF	GA	GD	Pts	Qualification or relegation
1	Dinamo Zagreb (C)	36	26	10	0	85	21	+64	88	Qualification to Champions League second qualifying round
2	Rijeka	36	22	9	5	76	29	+47	75	Qualification to Europa League second qualifying round
3	Hajduk Split (Note: Hajduk Split were deducted 3 points for not showing up for the match against Dinamo Zagreb in the 16th round.)	36	15	8	13	59	56	+3	50	Qualification to Europa League first qualifying round
4	Lokomotiva	36	13	7	16	59	68	−9	46	Qualification to Europa League first qualifying round
5	NK Zagreb	36	13	7	16	45	54	−9	46	
6	Slaven Belupo	36	11	9	16	38	49	−11	42	
7	RNK Split	36	9	14	13	42	49	−7	41	
8	Osijek	36	10	6	20	42	59	−17	36	
9	Istra 1961	36	7	14	15	36	59	−23	35	Qualification to relegation play-off
10	Zadar (R)	36	8	8	20	37	75	−38	32	Relegation to Croatian Second Football League

Source: Sportnet.hr
Rules for classification: 1) points; 2) goal difference; 3) number of goals scored.
For deciding champions, qualification to UEFA Europa League and relegation: 1st points; 2nd head-to-head points; 3rd head-to-head goal difference; 4th head-to-head away goals scored
(C) Champions; (R) Relegated

=== Druga HNL ===
Pos	Team	Pld	W	D	L	GF	GA	GD	Pts	Qualification or relegation
1	Inter Zaprešić (C, P)	30	17	7	6	48	25	+23	58	Promotion to Croatian First Football League
2	Sesvete	30	15	8	7	53	30	+23	53	Qualification to promotion play-off
3	Gorica	30	13	12	5	46	26	+20	51	
4	Rudeš	30	10	12	8	36	28	+8	42	
5	Imotski	30	9	11	10	31	38	−7	38	
6	Cibalia	30	10	8	12	36	44	−8	38	
7	Dugopolje	30	7	13	10	27	32	−5	34	
8	Segesta	30	9	7	14	31	42	−11	34	
9	Lučko	30	8	9	13	24	35	−11	33	
10	Hrvatski Dragovoljac	30	8	9	13	30	42	−12	33	Relegation to Croatian Third Football League (Note: Hrvatski Dragovoljac were kept in the division despite getting relegated.)
11	Bistra (R)	30	5	12	13	18	38	−20	27	Relegation to Croatian Third Football League
12	Pomorac (D, R)	0	0	0	0	0	0	0	0	Withdraw from the league

Source: Druga-HNL.com, Sportnet.hr (in Croatian)
Rules for classification: 1st points; 2nd goal difference; 3rd goals scored
For deciding champion, promotion and relegation: 1st points; 2nd head-to-head points; 3rd head-to-head goal difference; 4th head-to-head away goals scored.
(C) Champions; (D) Disqualified; (P) Promoted; (R) Relegated

== Croatian clubs in Europe ==
=== Summary ===
Club	Competition	Starting round	Final round	Matches played
Dinamo Zagreb	Champions League	2nd qualifying round	Europa League - Group stage	12
Rijeka	Europa League	2nd qualifying round	Group stage	12
Hajduk Split	Europa League	2nd qualifying round	Play-off round	6
RNK Split	Europa League	1st qualifying round	Play-off round	8

=== Dinamo Zagreb ===
Date	Venue	Opponents	Score	Dinamo Zagreb scorer(s)	Report
2014–15 Champions League - Second qualifying round
15 July 2014	Stadion Maksimir, Zagreb	(Lithuania) Žalgiris Vilnius	2–0	Soudani, Antolić	UEFA.com
22 July 2014	LFF Stadium, Vilnius	(Lithuania) Žalgiris Vilnius	2–0	Soudani, Šimunić	UEFA.com
2014–15 Champions League - Third qualifying round
30 July 2014	Nordjyske Arena, Aalborg	(Denmark) AaB	1–0	Brozović	UEFA.com
6 August 2014	Stadion Maksimir, Zagreb	(Denmark) AaB	0–2		UEFA.com
2014–15 Europa League - Play-off round
21 August 2014	Ilie Oană Stadium, Ploiești	(Romania) Petrolul Ploiești	3–1	Čop (2), Machado	UEFA.com
28 August 2014	Stadion Maksimir, Zagreb	(Romania) Petrolul Ploiești	2–1	Čop, Antolić	UEFA.com
2014–15 Europa League - Group stage
18 September 2014	Stadion Maksimir, Zagreb	(Romania) Astra Giurgiu	5–1	Soudani (3), Henríquez, Ćorić	UEFA.com
2 October 2014	Celtic Park, Glasgow	(Scotland) Celtic	0–1		UEFA.com
23 October 2014	Red Bull Arena, Wals-Siezenheim	(Austria) Red Bull Salzburg	2–4	Ademi, Henríquez	UEFA.com
6 November 2014	Stadion Maksimir, Zagreb	(Austria) Red Bull Salzburg	1–5	Henríquez	UEFA.com
27 November 2014	Stadionul Marin Anastasovici, Giurgiu	(Romania) Astra Giurgiu	0–1		UEFA.com
11 December 2014	Stadion Maksimir, Zagreb	(Scotland) Celtic	4–3	Pjaca (3), Brozović	UEFA.com

=== Rijeka ===
Date	Venue	Opponents	Score	Rijeka scorer(s)	Report
2014–15 Europa League - Second qualifying round
17 July 2014	Stadion Kantrida, Rijeka	(Hungary) Ferencváros	1–0	Krstanović	UEFA.com
24 July 2014	Ferenc Puskás Stadium, Budapest	(Hungary) Ferencváros	2–1	Krstanović, Samardžić	UEFA.com
2014–15 Europa League - Third qualifying round
31 July 2014	Tórsvøllur, Tórshavn	(Faroe Islands) Víkingur	5–1	Lešković, Kvržić (2), Jahović, Kramarić	UEFA.com
7 August 2014	Stadion Kantrida, Rijeka	(Faroe Islands) Víkingur	4–0	Jahović (3), Jacobsen (o.g.)	UEFA.com
2014–15 Europa League - Play-off round
21 August 2014	Stadion Kantrida, Rijeka	(Moldova) Sheriff Tiraspol	1–0	Leovac	UEFA.com
28 August 2014	Sheriff Stadium, Tiraspol	(Moldova) Sheriff Tiraspol	3–0	Ligger (o.g.), Kramarić, Moisés	UEFA.com
2014–15 Europa League - Group stage
18 September 2014	Stade Maurice Dufrasne, Liège	(Belgium) Standard Liège	0–2		UEFA.com
2 October 2014	Stadion Kantrida, Rijeka	(Spain) Sevilla	2–2	Kramarić, Kvržić	UEFA.com
23 October 2014	Stadion Kantrida, Rijeka	(Netherlands) Feyenoord	3–1	Kramarić (3)	UEFA.com
6 November 2014	De Kuip, Rotterdam	(Netherlands) Feyenoord	0–2		UEFA.com
27 November 2014	Stadion Kantrida, Rijeka	(Belgium) Standard Liège	2–0	Moisés, Kramarić	UEFA.com
11 December 2014	Ramón Sánchez Pizjuán Stadium, Seville	(Spain) Sevilla	0–1		UEFA.com

=== Hajduk Split ===
Date	Venue	Opponents	Score	Hajduk Split scorer(s)	Report
2014–15 Europa League - Second qualifying round
17 July 2014	Oriel Park, Dundalk	(Republic of Ireland) Dundalk	2–0	Caktaš, Vlašić	UEFA.com
24 July 2014	Stadion Poljud, Split	(Republic of Ireland) Dundalk	1–2	Kouassi	UEFA.com
2014–15 Europa League - Third qualifying round
31 July 2014	Shakhter Stadium, Karagandy	(Kazakhstan) Shakhter Karagandy	2–4	Gotal, Caktaš	UEFA.com
7 August 2014	Stadion Poljud, Split	(Kazakhstan) Shakhter Karagandy	3–0	Sušić, Maglica, Gotal	UEFA.com
2014–15 Europa League - Play-off round
20 August 2014	Olympic Stadium, Kyiv	(Ukraine) Dnipro Dnipropetrovsk	1–2	Sušić	UEFA.com
28 August 2014	Stadion Poljud, Split	(Ukraine) Dnipro Dnipropetrovsk	0–0		UEFA.com

=== RNK Split ===
Date	Venue	Opponents	Score	RNK Split scorer(s)	Report
2014–15 Europa League - First qualifying round
3 July 2014	Stadion Park Mladeži, Split	(Armenia) Mika	2–0	Glumac, Vojnović	UEFA.com
10 July 2014	Mika Stadium, Yerevan	(Armenia) Mika	1–1	Bilić	UEFA.com
2014–15 Europa League - Second qualifying round
17 July 2014	Stadion Park Mladeži, Split	(Israel) Hapoel Be'er Sheva	2–1	Dujmović, Bilić	UEFA.com
24 July 2014	GSZ Stadium, Larnaca	(Israel) Hapoel Be'er Sheva	0–0		UEFA.com
2014–15 Europa League - Third qualifying round
31 July 2014	Stadion Park Mladeži, Split	(Ukraine) Chornomorets Odesa	2–0	Rog, Belle	UEFA.com
7 August 2014	Chornomorets Stadium, Odesa	(Ukraine) Chornomorets Odesa	0–0		UEFA.com
2014–15 Europa League - Play-off round
21 August 2014	Stadion Hrvatski vitezovi, Dugopolje	(Italy) Torino	0–0		UEFA.com
28 August 2014	Stadio Olimpico di Torino, Turin	(Italy) Torino	0–1		UEFA.com

== See also ==
- List of Croatian football transfers summer 2014
