= Abdoul Karim Danté =

Malian footballer (born 1998)

Personal information
- Date of birth: 29 October 1998 (age 28)
- Place of birth: Bamako, Mali
- Height: 1.86 m (6 ft 1 in)
- Position: Centre back

Team information
- Current team: Drita
- Number: 21

Youth career
- 2014–2016: Jeanne d'Arc
- 2016–2018: Anderlecht

Senior career*
Years	Team	Apps	(Gls)
2018–2019	Anderlecht	4	(0)
2019–2020	Virton	3	(0)
2020–2022	RWDM	30	(3)
2022–2024	Swift Hesperange	21	(1)
2025–2026	Panevėžys	31	(2)
2026–	Drita	8	(2)

International career^{‡}
2015	Mali U17	6	(1)
2017	Mali U20	3	(1)
2016–2018	Mali	7	(0)
- * Club domestic league appearances and goals as of 22 June 2026 ‡ National team caps and goals as of 17 January 2025

Abdoul Karim Danté (born 29 October 1998) is a Malian professional footballer who plays as a centre back for Kosovar club Drita.

== Professional career ==
On 29 October 2016, Danté signed with Anderlecht and joined their academy after impressing with the Malian club Jeanne d'Arc FC. He made his Belgian First Division A debut for R.S.C. Anderlecht on 6 April 2018 in a 2–1 win against R. Charleroi S.C. coming on as a substitute on the 89th minute.

On 6 August 2019, Danté joined R.E. Virton on a contract until June 2022.

In September 2020, Danté signed with RWDM.

On 16 January 2025 Danté signed with lithuanian Panevėžys Club.

== International career ==
Danté captained the Mali national under-17 football team at the 2015 African U-17 Championship, and helped lead them to victory as they won the tournament. Danté also captained the Mali national U-17 football team at the 2015 FIFA U-17 World Cup (October–November 2015, in Chile). He helped Mali achieve the vice-champion result out of 24 national teams.

He made his senior debut with the Mali national football team in a 2-2 2016 African Nations Championship with Uganda on 19 January 2016. Danté played the Mali-Japan senior match (1-1, in Liège Belgique, on 26 March 2018), wearing the number 2.

== Honours ==
FK Panevėžys

- Lithuanian Cup: 2025

FC Drita

- Kosovo Super League 2025-26

Mali U17:

- Winner and captain in African U-17 Championship: 2015
- Vice champion and captain: 2015 FIFA U-17 World Cup
