= Yeison Guerrero =

Ecuadorian footballer (born 1998)

Personal information
- Full name: Yeison Guerrero Perea
- Date of birth: 21 April 1998 (age 28)
- Place of birth: San Lorenzo, Esmeraldas, Ecuador
- Height: 1.65 m (5 ft 5 in)
- Position: Forward

Youth career
- 2011: CS Norte América
- 2012–2016: Independiente

Senior career*
Years	Team	Apps	(Gls)
2016–2018	Independiente	1	(0)
2018	Independiente Juniors		
2019	Veracruz	1	(0)
2020	América de Quito		
2020	Delfín	1	(0)
2022–2023	Leones		
2023–2026	Miguel Iturralde		
2026	Gualaceo	0	(0)
2026	Miguel Iturralde		

International career^{‡}
2015	Ecuador U17	5	(2)
2016–2017	Ecuador U20	6	(0)
- * Club domestic league appearances and goals as of 18:44, 15 October 2026 (UTC) ‡ National team caps and goals as of 18:44, 16 April 2019 (UTC)

Yeison Guerrero Perea (born 21 April 1998) is an Ecuadorian footballer.

== Early and personal life ==
Guerrero was born in San Lorenzo in the Esmeraldas Province of Ecuador to Guillermo Guerrero and Elsa Perea. He has a brother, Joan.

== Club career ==
Guerrero took an interest in football at a young age, with his father stating that he would pretend to kick a ball before he could even walk. A noted goal-scorer in local competitions growing up, he moved from San Lorenzo to Guayaquil to join CS Norte América in 2011. After just a year, he transferred to Quito-based Independiente, where he was coached by Juan Carlos León, who criticised Guerrero for his poor attitude, as he would constantly miss classes.

After his attendances improved, he continued to progress through the academy, and made his professional debut in the 2016 season, starting in a 5–2 loss to El Nacional on 20 July. After no appearances in the following season, he dropped down to play for Independiente's reserve team, Independiente Juniors, helping them achieve promotion to the Ecuadorian Serie B from the 2018 Segunda Categoría.

In January 2019, Veracruz manager Robert Siboldi stated that Guerrero had trialled with the Mexican club, and was close to signing. The move was confirmed at the end of the month, with Guerrero signing a three-year deal. Despite this, he returned to Ecuador the following year, joining América de Quito before ending the year with Delfín, where he made one Ecuadorian Serie A appearance.

== International career ==
Continually overlooked in favour of Mateo Tello, Guerrero was called up to the Ecuador national under-17 football team for microcycles after age-related document tampering meant several members of the squad faced suspensions. Included in the squad for the 2015 FIFA U-17 World Cup, Guerrero scored in Ecuador's opening game against Honduras in their 3–0 win—a goal later nominated for Goal of the Tournament. He would score again, in a 2–0 win against Belgium, to secure a place in the Round of 16. He was called up to represent his nation again for the 2017 FIFA U-20 World Cup, but only featured once as Ecuador were knocked out in the group stage.

== Career statistics ==
=== Club ===
As of 11 June 2025.

Appearances and goals by club, season and competition
Club	Season	League			Cup (Note: Includes Copa Ecuador and Copa MX)		Other		Total	
Club	Season	Division	Apps	Goals	Apps	Goals	Apps	Goals	Apps	Goals
Independiente	2016	Ecuadorian Serie A	1	0	0	0	0	0	1	0
Independiente Juniors	2018	Segunda Categoría	–		2	0	0	0	2	0
Veracruz	2018–19	Liga MX	1	0	0	0	0	0	1	0
Delfín	2020	Ecuadorian Serie A	1	0	0	0	0	0	1	0
Gualaceo	2026	Ecuadorian Serie B	0	0	0	0	0	0	0	0
Career total			3	0	2	0	0	0	5	0
