= South Africa national under-17 soccer team =

South Africa under-17
- Nickname: Amajimbos
- Association: South African; Football Association
- Confederation: CAF (Africa)
- Sub-confederation: COSAFA
- Head coach: (South Africa) Vela Khumalo
- Captain: Lwandiso Radebe
- Most caps: Emile Witbooi (37 caps)
- Top scorer: Neo Bohloko (16 goals)
- Home stadium: FNB Stadium
- FIFA code: RSA
First colours	Second colours

First international
- South Africa 3–1 Zimbabwe (1995)

Biggest win
- South Africa 7–0 Comoros (18 September 2025)

Biggest defeat
- Senegal 5–0 South Africa (10 May 2023)

U-17 Africa Cup of Nations
- Appearances: 5 (first in 2005)
- Best result: (silver) Runners-Up (2015)

COSAFA U-17 Youth Championship
- Appearances: 12 (first in 1994)
- Best result: (gold) Champions (1994), (2002), (2020), and (2025)

FIFA U-17 World Cup
- Appearances: 2 (first in 2015)
- Best result: Round of 32 (2025)
- Website: https://www.safa.net/

The South Africa national under-17 football team, nicknamed Amajimbos, is a youth football (soccer) team, which represents South Africa at under-17 level and is controlled by the South African Football Association, the governing body for football in South Africa. The team's main objectives are to qualify and play at the U-17 Africa Cup of Nations and FIFA U-17 World Cup and develop the players for South Africa national soccer team.

== History ==
=== FIFA U-17 World Cup ===
The team's greatest achievement to date include a second-place finish at the 2015 African U-17 Championship, hosted in Niger and qualifying for the 2015 FIFA U-17 World Cup in Chile.

In 2025, ten years after they made their FIFA U-17 World Cup debut, they qualified for the 2025 FIFA U-17 World Cup in Qatar after reaching the quarterfinals of the 2025 U-17 Africa Cup of Nations. The team became the first South African team to win their first match at the world cup when they won 3–1 against Bolivia despite being a man down. They made it past the group stages for the first team reaching the round of 32 where they lost 3–0 to Japan.

=== U-17 Africa Cup of Nations ===
At the 2025 U-17 Africa Cup of Nations they exited in the quarterfinals with a 3–1 loss to hosts Morocco after finishing as runners-up in Group B (1 loss, 1 win, and a draw). The team qualified for their second FIFA U-17 World Cup in Qatar.

=== FIFA U/16 Talent Development Scheme Tournament ===
In 2024, they were invited to play at the FIFA U/16 Talent Development Scheme Tournament held in Ivory Coast. The team finished with 2 wins and 1 loss.

=== COSAFA U-17 Cup ===
They won the 2020 COSAFA U-17 Cup 4–2 via penalties after the match ended in a 1–1 draw against Zambia. At the 2022 COSAFA U-17 Challenge Cup, they lost 1–0 in the final to Zambia. They won their fourth COSAFA title in 2025 defeating Angola 2–1 in the final.

== Current squad ==
The following 21 players were selected for the 2025 FIFA U-17 World Cup held in Qatar between 3-21 November 2025:

No.	Pos.	Player	Date of birth (age)	Club
1	GK	Lwandiso Radebe	25 March 2009 (aged 16)	(South African Football Association) Mamelodi Sundowns
3	DF	Lunje Noqobo	16 March 2008 (aged 17)	(South African Football Association) Kaizer Chiefs
4	DF	Liam Marithinus	27 February 2008 (aged 17)	(South African Football Association) Mamelodi Sundowns
5	FW	Luke Hendricks	23 March 2008 (aged 17)	(South African Football Association) Ubuntu Cape Town
6	MF	Kamohelo Maraletse	21 September 2008 (aged 17)	(South African Football Association) Mamelodi Sundowns
7	FW	Selwyn Stevens	15 February 2008 (aged 17)	(South African Football Association) Mamelodi Sundowns
8	MF	Teboho Mlangeni	19 January 2008 (aged 17)	(South African Football Association) Kaizer Chiefs
9	FW	Shaun Els	11 May 2008 (aged 17)	(South African Football Association) Kaizer Chiefs
10	FW	Emile Witbooi	29 August 2008 (aged 17)	(South African Football Association) Cape Town City
11	DF	Alwande Booysen	6 May 2008 (aged 17)	(South African Football Association) Lamontville Golden Arrows
12	FW	Tumi Mothapo-Bowes	15 May 2008 (aged 17)	(South African Football Association) Orlando Pirates
13	DF	Omphemetse Sekgoto	11 March 2010 (aged 15)	(South African Football Association) Mamelodi Sundowns
14	DF	Abulele Dlekedla	15 July 2008 (aged 17)	(South African Football Association) Cape Town City
15	FW	Neo Bohloko	1 April 2008 (aged 17)	(South African Football Association) Kaizer Chiefs
16	GK	Keabetswe Morake	19 January 2009 (aged 16)	(South African Football Association) Kaizer Chiefs
17	MF	Joshua Taylor	28 July 2008 (aged 17)	(South African Football Association) Cape Town City
18	FW	Will Henson	3 April 2008 (aged 17)	(South African Football Association) SuperSport United
19	FW	Lebo Dhlamini	11 April 2008 (aged 17)	(South African Football Association) Kaizer Chiefs
20	GK	Sello Mokhobo	3 January 2008 (aged 17)	(South African Football Association) Virginia Sports Academy
21	FW	Lebogang Mswane	21 March 2008 (aged 17)	(South African Football Association) Mamelodi Sundowns

== Results and fixtures ==
The following is a list of match results in the last 12 months, as well as any future matches that have been scheduled.

Legend

Win Draw Loss Fixture

=== 2025 ===
3 November FIFA U-17 World Cup	South Africa	3–1	Bolivia	Al Rayyan, Qatar
	Witbooi 38' Bohloko 50' Els 90+5'		Maraude 72' (p)	Stadium: Aspire Zone

6 November FIFA U-17 World Cup	Qatar	1–1	South Africa	Al Rayyan, Qatar
	Mohamed 3'		Witbooi 16'	Stadium: Aspire Zone

9 November FIFA U-17 World Cup	Italy	3–1	South Africa	Al Rayyan, Qatar
	Inacio 4', 58' Arena 55'		Els 38'	Stadium: Aspire Zone

15 November FIFA U-17 World Cup	Japan	3–0	South Africa	Al Rayyan, Qatar
	Asada 48'; Yoshida 59'; Fujii 72'			Stadium: Aspire Zone

=== 2026 ===
5 April UEFA U-16 Development Tournament	Georgia	3–0	South Africa	Boyana, Bulgaria
				Stadium: National Football Base

5 April UEFA U-16 Development Tournament	Kosovo	1–5	South Africa	Boyana, Bulgaria
				Stadium: National Football Base

5 April UEFA U-16 Development Tournament	Bulgaria	2–2 (3-4 p)	South Africa	Boyana, Bulgaria
				Stadium: National Football Base
	Penalties
	3		4

14 May AFCON U-17	Senegal	v	South Africa	Sale, Morocco
17:00				Stadium: Complexe Mohammed VI de Football

17 May AFCON U-17	South Africa	v	Algeria	Sale, Morocco
17:00				Stadium: Complexe Mohammed VI de Football

20 May AFCON U-17	South Africa	v	Ghana	Sale, Morocco
20:00				Stadium: Complexe Mohammed VI de Football

== Competitive record ==
=== FIFA U-17 World Cup ===
Hosts/Year	Round	GP	W	D	L	GS	GA
(China) 1985	Banned						
(Canada) 1987	Banned						
(Scotland) 1989	Banned						
(Italy) 1991	Banned						
(Japan) 1993	Banned						
(Ecuador) 1995	Did not qualify						
(Egypt) 1997	Did not qualify						
(New Zealand) 1999	Did not qualify						
(Trinidad and Tobago) 2001	Did not qualify						
(Finland) 2003	Did not qualify						
(Peru) 2005	Did not qualify						
(South Korea) 2007	Did not qualify						
(Nigeria) 2009	Did not qualify						
(Mexico) 2011	Did not qualify						
(United Arab Emirates) 2013	Did not qualify						
(Chile) 2015	Group Stage	3	0	1	2	2	5
(India) 2017	Did not qualify						
(Brazil) 2019	Did not qualify						
(Indonesia) 2023	Did not qualify						
(Qatar) 2025	Round 32	4	1	1	2	5	8
Total	2/20	7	1	2	4	7	13

=== U-17 Africa Cup of Nations record ===
U-17 Africa Cup of Nations
Hosts/Year	Round	GP	W	D	L	GS	GA
(Mali) 1995	Did not qualify						
(Botswana) 1997	Did not qualify						
(Guinea) 1999	Did not qualify						
(Seychelles) 2001	Did not qualify						
(Eswatini) 2003	Did not qualify						
(The Gambia) 2005	Fourth Place	5	2	1	2	8	6
(Togo) 2007	Group Stage	3	1	1	1	5	5
(Algeria) 2009	Did not qualify						
(Rwanda) 2011	Did not qualify						
(Morocco) 2013	Did not qualify						
(Niger) 2015	Runners-up	5	2	2	1	8	7
(Gabon) 2017	Did not qualify						
(Tanzania) 2019	Did not qualify						
(Morocco) ~~2021~~	Cancelled						
(Algeria) 2023	Quarter-finals	4	1	0	3	5	12
(Morocco) 2025	Quarter-finals	4	1	1	2	5	8
(Morocco) 2026	Qualified						
Total	Runners-up	21	7	5	9	31	38

=== COSAFA U-17 Championship ===
COSAFA U-17 Challenge Cup record
Year	Round	Pld	W	D*	L	GS	GA	GD
(Mauritius) 2016	Runners-Up	5	4	0	1	11	1	+10
(Mauritius) 2017	Fourth place	5	3	0	1	11	11	0
(Mauritius) 2018	Runners-Up	5	3	1	1	8	3	+5
(Malawi) 2019	Group Stage	3	0	1	2	1	11	+19
(South Africa) 2020	Champions	5	3	1	1	7	6	+1
(Lesotho) 2021	Did not participate							
(Malawi) 2022	Runners-Up	5	3	0	2	17	3	+14
(South Africa) 2024	Semi-finalist	4	3	0	1	11	4	+7
(Zimbabwe) 2025	Champions	5	5	0	0	22	3	+19
Total		37	24	3	9	88	41	

== Head-to-head record ==
The following table shows South Africa's head-to-head record in the FIFA U-17 World Cup.

Opponent	Pld	W	D	L	GF	GA	GD	Win %
Costa Rica	1	0	0	1	1	2	−1	0.00
North Korea	1	0	1	0	1	1	+0	0.00
Russia	1	0	0	1	0	2	−2	0.00
Total	3	0	1	2	2	5	−3	0.00

== See also ==
- Bafana Bafana (South Africa national football team)
- Amajita (South Africa national under-20 football team)
- Amaglug-glug (South Africa national under-23 football team)
- Amabinneplaas (South Africa national development football team)
- Africa U-17 Cup of Nations
