= Sidiki Maiga =

Malian footballer (born 1998)

Personal information
- Date of birth: 18 January 1999 (age 27)
- Positions: Forward; winger

Senior career*
Years	Team	Apps	(Gls)
- Real Bamako
2017–2019	Alcorcón B		
2019–2021	Toledo		
2021–?	Azuqueca		

International career
- Mali U17
- Mali U20
- * Club domestic league appearances and goals

Sidiki Maiga (born 28 December 1998) is a Malian footballer who most recently played as a forward or winger for Azuqueca. Besides Mali, he has played in Spain.

== Career ==
As of November 2015, aged 16, Maiga was playing for Real Bamako.

In June 2015 he won the 2015 African U-17 Championship with the Mali under-17 national team. British newspaper The Guardian listed Maiga in its "Next Generation 2015" list of "50 of the best young talents in world football" in early October 2015.

Maiga represented Mali at the 2015 FIFA U-17 World Cup, helping them finish second place.

In 2016, Maiga was one of five nominees for the Golden Boy award for the best young player in Africa.

In January 2017, Maiga joined Spanish club Alcorcón along with Mali U20 teammate Moussa Diakite, being initially assigned to the side's B team. In July 2019, while contracted to Alcorcón, he trialled with Betis Deportivo, the reserves of La Liga side Real Betis, and scored two goals in a friendly against Écija Balompié.

In October 2019 Maiga was expected to make his debut for Spanish club Toledo under manager Manu Calleja. He was competing for Toledo's best player of the season award in December 2020, being placed fifth in the rankings. He had scored four goals in nine appearances by early January 2020, averaging a goal every 90 minutes. In late January 2020, he underwent surgery on a scaphoid fracture in his wrist. In April, while the season was interrupted by the COVID-19 pandemic, he was living with his Mali teammate and friend Samu Diarrá, who played as a goalkeeper for Villarrubia in Segunda División B.

Maiga extended his contract for a season with Azuqueca in June 2022, having scored 15 goals in 28 appearances in the previous season.

== Style of play ==
At the 2015 African U-17 Championship, Maiga was deployed at the right side of a three-man attack. At the time, The Guardian's Nick Ames described him as a "pacy, tricky menace of a winger with set-piece prowess".
