= Dante Rigo =

Belgian footballer (born 1998)

Personal information
- Full name: Dante Rigo
- Date of birth: 11 December 1998 (age 27)
- Place of birth: Tremelo, Belgium
- Height: 1.80 m (5 ft 11 in)
- Position: Midfielder

Youth career
- 2003–2005: KSK Heist
- 2005–2006: SC Aarschot
- 2006–2007: Lierse
- 2007–2016: PSV

Senior career*
Years	Team	Apps	(Gls)
2016–2021	Jong PSV	74	(3)
2017–2022	PSV	7	(1)
2019–2020	→ Sparta Rotterdam (loan)	16	(0)
2020–2021	→ ADO Den Haag (loan)	11	(0)
2022–2023	Beerschot	37	(2)
2023–2025	Grenoble	61	(1)
2025–2026	SK Beveren	25	(0)

International career
2013	Belgium U15	3	(0)
2014	Belgium U16	4	(0)
2014–2015	Belgium U17	17	(3)
2016–2017	Belgium U19	8	(1)
2019	Belgium U21	1	(0)
- * Club domestic league appearances and goals as of 28 August 2026

Dante Rigo (born 11 December 1998) is a Belgian professional footballer who plays as a midfielder.

== Career ==
He formerly played for Sparta Rotterdam.

Rigo made his professional debut as a Jong PSV player in the Eerste Divisie on 12 August 2016 against SC Cambuur. He played the full game. Rigo played his first game for PSV in September 2017, when PSV played a domestic cup match against SDC Putten.

In June 2019, Rigo signed a new contract with the club until summer 2022 and joined Eredivisie club Sparta Rotterdam on loan.

In August 2020, Rigo joined ADO Den Haag on a season-long loan.

On 4 January 2022, Rigo left PSV and signed for Beerschot on a contract until the end of the season, with the option of a further year.

On 26 June 2023, Rigo signed for Ligue 2 club Grenoble on a three-year deal, having rejected a new contract with Beerschot.

On 10 September 2025, Rigo signed for SK Beveren on a two-year deal. On 3 September 2026, the contract with Beveren was mutually terminated.

== Career statistics ==
As of 4 January 2022

Appearances and goals by club, season and competition
Club	Season	League			National cup		Other		Total	
Club	Season	Division	Apps	Goals	Apps	Goals	Apps	Goals	Apps	Goals
Jong PSV	2016–17	Eerste Divisie	23	0	—		0	0	23	0
Jong PSV	2017–18	Eerste Divisie	27	2	—		0	0	27	2
Jong PSV	2018–19	Eerste Divisie	13	1	—		0	0	13	1
Jong PSV	2019–20	Eerste Divisie	0	0	—		0	0	0	0
Jong PSV	2020–21	Eerste Divisie	11	0	—		0	0	11	0
Jong PSV	Total		74	3	0	0	0	0	74	3
PSV	2017–18	Eredivisie	2	0	1	0	0	0	3	0
PSV	2018–19	Eredivisie	5	1	1	0	0	0	6	1
PSV	2019–20	Eredivisie	0	0	0	0	0	0	0	0
PSV	2020–21	Eredivisie	0	0	0	0	0	0	0	0
PSV	2021–22	Eredivisie	0	0	0	0	0	0	0	0
PSV	Total		7	1	2	0	0	0	9	1
Sparta Rotterdam (loan)	2019–20	Eredivisie	16	0	2	0	0	0	18	0
ADO Den Haag (loan)	2020–21	Eredivisie	11	0	1	0	0	0	12	0
Beerschot	2021–22	Belgian First Division A	0	0	0	0	0	0	0	0
Career total			108	4	5	0	0	0	113	4

== Honours ==
PSV

- Eredivisie: 2017–18
- Johan Cruyff Shield: 2016

Belgium U17

- FIFA U-17 World Cup third place: 2015
