= Jefferson Júnior =

Brazilian footballer (born 1994)

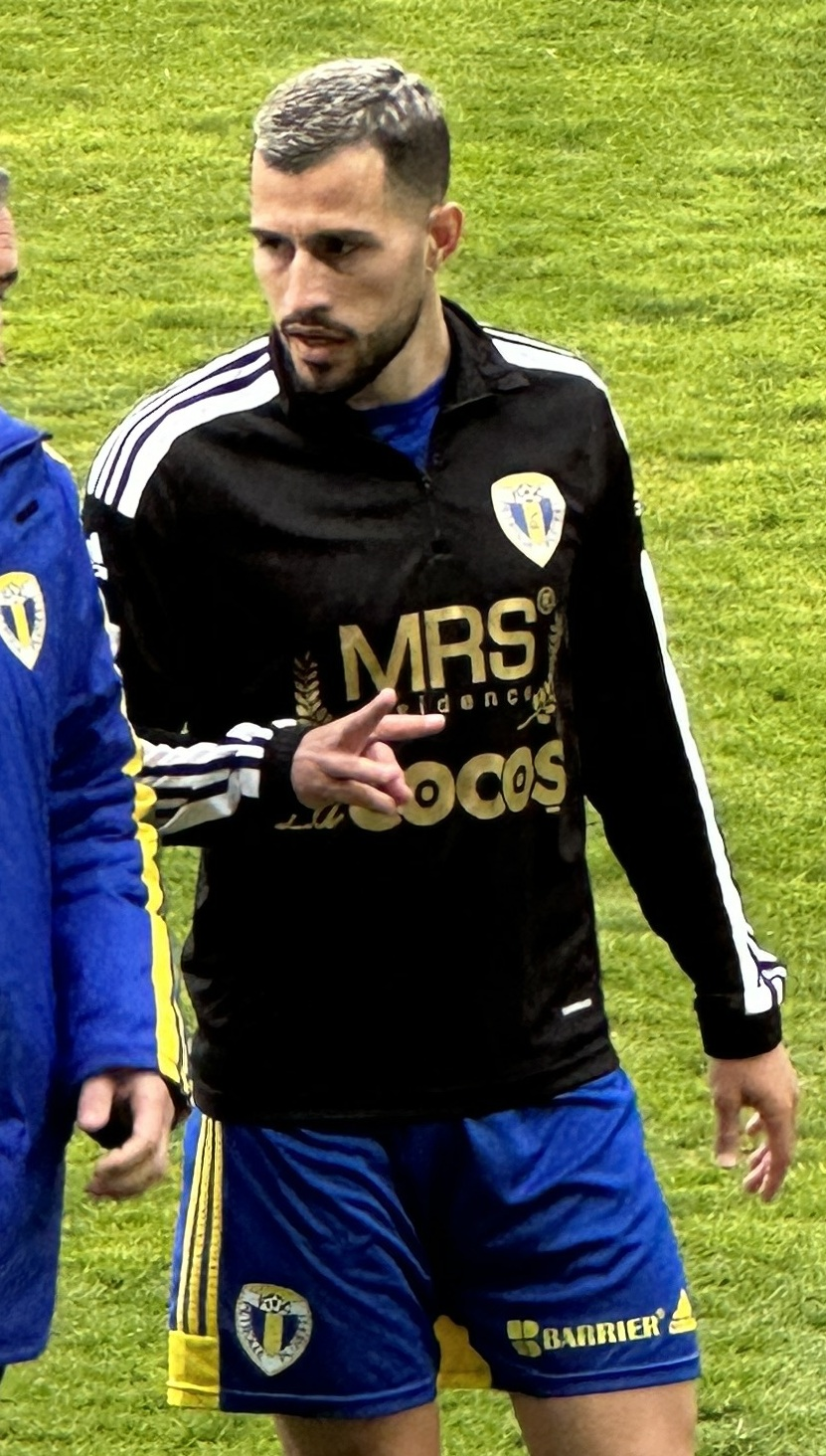
- Jefferson with Petrolul Ploiești in 2023

Personal information
- Full name: Jefferson Nogueira Júnior
- Date of birth: 22 January 1994 (age 32)
- Place of birth: Campinas, Brazil
- Height: 1.84 m (6 ft 0 in)
- Position: Midfielder

Team information
- Current team: Ankara Keçiörengücü
- Number: 10

Youth career
- 2005–2010: Paulínia
- 2010–2012: Grêmio
- 2012: Figueirense

Senior career*
Years	Team	Apps	(Gls)
2012–2017	Figueirense	41	(1)
2013	→ Paulínia (loan)		
2017	→ Fortaleza (loan)	4	(0)
2018–2022	Gaziantep	84	(8)
2022	Moreirense	14	(2)
2023–2024	Petrolul Ploiești	23	(0)
2024–2025	Boluspor	47	(12)
2025–2026	Vanspor	36	(5)
2026–	Ankara Keçiörengücü	0	(0)
- * Club domestic league appearances and goals as of 6 May 2026

Jefferson Nogueira Júnior (born 22 January 1994) is a Brazilian professional footballer who plays as a midfielder for Turkish TFF 1. Lig club Ankara Keçiörengücü.

After starting his senior career at Figueirense in 2012, Jefferson went on to compete professionally in Turkey, Portugal, and Romania.

== Career ==
=== Early career and Figueirense ===
Born in Campinas, São Paulo, Jefferson started out in the academies of Paulínia and Grêmio, before joining Figueirense's youth setup in 2012. He made his senior debut on 2 December that year, aged 18, coming on as a second-half substitute in a 3–0 Série A away loss to Coritiba.

After a loan stint back to Paulínia, Jefferson was definitely promoted to the main squad in 2014. On 16 November 2014, he scored his first professional goal in a 1–1 draw at Atlético Mineiro.

=== Gaziantep ===
In January 2018, Jefferson moved abroad for the first time to TFF First League team Gazişehir Gaziantep. He made his debut on the 22nd in a 3–0 league defeat of Samsunspor, and scored for the first time on 14 April in a 3–2 win over Altınordu.

During his second season in Turkey, Jefferson contributed with one goal from 15 appearances as the club achieved promotion to the Süper Lig. On 19 October 2019, he registered his first goal in the top division in a 1–4 away loss to Trabzonspor.

=== Moreirense ===
On 27 January 2022, Jefferson agreed to a contract until the end of the season with Portuguese club Moreirense. He scored his first goals in a 2–1 Primeira Liga win over Gil Vicente, on 8 April.

Jefferson amassed 16 appearances in all competitions, as Moreirense lost the relegation play-offs against Chaves 1–2 on aggregate.

=== Petrolul Ploiești ===
After being linked to Romanian team Universitatea Craiova in the summer of 2022, Jefferson agreed a deal for an undisclosed period with fellow Liga I club Petrolul Ploiești on 10 March 2023.

During his 11-month spell, Jefferson played 26 matches without scoring, of which 23 in the Romanian top flight.

=== Boluspor ===
On 2 February 2024, Jefferson returned to Turkey by signing for TFF First League side Boluspor.

== Career statistics ==
As of match played 11 May 2024

Appearances and goals by club, season and competition
Club	Season	League			State League		National cup		League cup		Continental		Other		Total	
Club	Season	Division	Apps	Goals	Apps	Goals	Apps	Goals	Apps	Goals	Apps	Goals	Apps	Goals	Apps	Goals
Figueirense	2012	Série A	1	0	—		—		—		—		—		1	0
Figueirense	2014	Série A	15	1	1 (Note: Appearance(s) in Campeonato Catarinense)	0	2	0	—		—		2 (Note: Appearances in Primeira Liga (Brazil))	0	20	1
Figueirense	2015	Série A	6	0	4	0	5	0	—		—		—		15	0
Figueirense	2016	Série A	19	0	10	0	4	0	—		1 (Note: Appearance in Copa Sudamericana)	0	—		34	0
Figueirense	Total		41	1	15	0	11	0	—		1	0	2	0	70	1
Fortaleza (loan)	2017	Série C	4	0	12 (Note: Appearances in Campeonato Cearense)	1	1	0	—		—		5 (Note: Appearances in Copa do Nordeste)	0	22	1
Gaziantep	2017–18	TFF First League	14	2	—		—		—		—		—		14	2
Gaziantep	2018–19	TFF First League	13	1	—		1	0	—		—		2 (Note: Appearances in TFF First League promotion play-offs)	0	16	1
Gaziantep	2019–20	Süper Lig	20	1	—		4	1	—		—		—		24	2
Gaziantep	2020–21	Süper Lig	30	4	—		2	0	—		—		—		32	4
Gaziantep	2021–22	Süper Lig	7	0	—		0	0	—		—		—		7	0
Gaziantep	Total		84	8	—		7	1	—		—		2	0	93	9
Moreirense	2021–22	Primeira Liga	14	2	—		—		—		—		2 (Note: Appearances in Primeira Liga relegation play-offs)	0	16	2
Petrolul Ploiești	2022–23	Liga I	6	0	—		—		—		—		—		6	0
Petrolul Ploiești	2023–24	Liga I	17	0	—		3	0	—		—		—		20	0
Petrolul Ploiești	Total		23	0	—		3	0	—		—		—		26	0
Boluspor	2023–24	TFF First League	14	2	—		—		—		—		—		14	2
Career total			180	13	27	1	22	1	0	0	1	0	11	0	243	15

== Honours ==
Figueirense

- Campeonato Catarinense: 2014, 2015

Fortaleza

- Copa Fares Lopes runner-up: 2017
