= Aly Mallé =

Malian footballer

Personal information
- Date of birth: 3 April 1998 (age 28)
- Place of birth: Bamako, Mali
- Height: 1.75 m (5 ft 9 in)
- Position: Winger

Youth career
- Black Stars

Senior career*
Years	Team	Apps	(Gls)
2014–2016	Black Stars		
2016–2017	Watford	0	(0)
2016–2017	→ Granada B (loan)	20	(6)
2017	→ Granada (loan)	10	(0)
2017–2020	Udinese	0	(0)
2018	→ Lorca (loan)	12	(1)
2019	→ Grasshoppers (loan)	6	(0)
2019–2020	→ Balıkesirspor (loan)	26	(6)
2020–2021	Ascoli	1	(0)
2021–2023	Yeni Malatyaspor	28	(0)
2021–2022	→ Erzurumspor (loan)	23	(2)
2023	Eyüpspor	0	(0)
2023	→ Keçiörengücü (loan)	11	(2)
2024	Oțelul Galați	13	(0)
2024–2025	Şanlıurfaspor	15	(5)
2025	Iğdır	11	(0)
2025–2026	Sivasspor	25	(0)

International career
2015	Mali U17	12	(4)
2019	Mali U23	4	(0)
Medal record
Men's football
Representing Mali
FIFA U-17 World Cup
Runner-up	2015 Chile
- * Club domestic league appearances and goals as of 6 May 2026

Aly Mallé (born 3 April 1998) is a Malian professional footballer who plays as a left winger.

== Club career ==
Born in Bamako, Mallé began his senior career with AS Black Stars. In July 2015 he went on a trial at 1. FC Köln, but nothing came of it.

Mallé agreed to a contract with Watford F.C. late in February 2016, and officially joined the Hornets on 29 July.

Immediately after joining Watford Mallé was loaned to Granada CF, being initially assigned to the reserves in Segunda División B. He made his debut for the B-side on 4 September, coming on as a late substitute in a 2–1 home win against La Roda CF.

Mallé scored his first goal in Spain on 1 October 2016, but in a 2–1 away loss against Real Murcia. He made his first team – and La Liga – debut on 21 January 2017, starting in a 1–3 defeat at RCD Espanyol.

On 2 June 2017, following Granada's relegation, Mallé signed a five-year contract with Udinese. The following 6 January, after making no appearances for the club, he was loaned to Segunda División side Lorca FC until June.

Mallé scored his first professional goal on 20 January 2018, netting the first after 18 seconds in a 3–2 home loss against SD Huesca.

On 16 January 2019, Mallé joined to Grasshoppers on loan with an option to buy. In September 2019, udinese agreed on a loan with Balikesirspor for one year.

On 19 September 2020, he signed a multi-year contract with Ascoli. His contract with Ascoli was terminated by mutual consent on 27 January 2021.

On 1 February 2021, he signed for Yeni Malatyaspor for two and half years.

== International career ==
Mallé was included in Mali under-17 squad for the 2015 FIFA U-17 World Cup hosted in Chile. He was elected the Bronze Ball of the tournament, after being an undisputed starter and scoring two goals and providing two assists.

Mallé was also included in the 30-man list ahead of the 2016 African Nations Championship, but was cut from the final squad.

== Honours ==
Oțelul Galați

- Cupa României runner-up: 2023–24

Mali U17

- African U-17 Championship: 2015
- FIFA U-17 World Cup runner-up: 2015

Individual

- FIFA U-17 World Cup Bronze Ball: 2015
