= 2015 African U-17 Championship =

Coupe d'Afrique des nations des moins de 17 ans 2015

Tournament details
- Host country: Niger
- Dates: 15 February – 1 March
- Teams: 8 (from 1 confederation)
- Venue: 2 (in 1 host city)

Final positions
- Champions: Mali (1st title)
- Runners-up: South Africa
- Third place: Guinea
- Fourth place: Nigeria

Tournament statistics
- Matches played: 16
- Goals scored: 45 (2.81 per match)
- Top scorer(s): (Nigeria) Victor Osimhen (4 goals)

The 2015 African U-17 Championship was the 11th edition of the biennial international youth football tournament organized by the Confederation of African Football (CAF) for players aged 17 and below. The tournament took place in Niamey, Niger, and was originally scheduled to be held between 2 and 16 May. However, the date of the opening match was pushed forward to 15 February, with the tournament scheduled to conclude with the final on 1 March.

The semi-finalists of the tournament qualified for the 2015 FIFA U-17 World Cup in Chile. Mali won the tournament, and were joined by South Africa, Guinea, and Nigeria as CAF qualifiers for the 2015 FIFA U-17 World Cup.

== Qualification ==
The qualifiers were played between June and September 2014. At the end of the qualification phase, seven teams joined the hosts Niger.

=== Player eligibility ===
During CAF Executive Committee meetings held on 21 and 22 September 2013, the CAF Medical Committee was instructed to continue the use of magnetic resonance imaging (MRI) scans to determine the ages of players and consequently their eligibility to participate in the qualifying stages of the tournament. It was also directed to ensure the authenticity of the process as well as the identity of the players involved.

=== Qualified teams ===
- Cameroon
- Guinea
- Ivory Coast
- Mali
- Niger (hosts)
- Nigeria
- South Africa
- Zambia

=== Disqualified ===
- Team Ghana was disqualified on 26 October, after medical test provided by the African Confederation after their first leg play off victory against Cameroon found that one of their players failed age eligibility confirmations. Ghana appealed but failed.

== Venues ==
Cities	Venues	Capacity
Niamey	Stade Général Seyni Kountché	35,000
Niamey	Stade Municipal	10,000

== Match officials ==
The referees were:

Referees

- (Algeria) Mustapha Ghorbal
- (Angola) Helder Martins de Carvalho
- (Cameroon) Antoine Max Depadoux Effa Essouma
- (Comoros) Ali Mohamed Adelaid
- (Republic of the Congo) Lazard Tsiba Kamba
- (Democratic Republic of the Congo) Jean-Jacques Ndala
- (Equatorial Guinea) Joaquin Esono Eyang
- (Morocco) Noureddine El Jaafari
- (Niger) Gomno Daouda
- (Nigeria) Ferdinand Anietie Udoh
- (Senegal) Daouda Kebe
- (Togo) Kokou Hougnimon Fagla
- (Uganda) Denis Batte

Assistant referees

- (Benin) Babadjide Bienvenu Dina
- (Comoros) Soulaimane Amaldine
- (Egypt) Ahmed Hossam Taha
- (Ethiopia) Temesgin Samuel Atango
- (Ivory Coast) Marius Donatien Tan
- (Guinea) Abdoulaye Sylla
- (Kenya) Gilbert Cheruiyot
- (Lesotho) Souru Phatsoane
- (Mozambique) Arsénio Chadreque Marengula
- (Niger) Abdourahamane Diarra Soumana
- (Senegal) Ababacar Sene
- (Senegal) Serigne Cheikh Toure
- (Somalia) Hamza Hagi Abdi
- (Sudan) Mohammed Abdallah Ibrahim
- (Tunisia) Majed Rhouma
- (Zimbabwe) Tapfumanei Mutengwa

== Draw ==
The draw for the final tournament was held on 21 December 2014, 11:00 UTC+02:00, at the CAF Headquarters in Cairo, Egypt. Niger and Ivory Coast were seeded and placed into Groups A and B respectively.

== Squads ==
Each team can register a squad of 21 players (three of whom must be goalkeepers).

== Group stage ==
The group winners and runners-up advanced to the semi-finals and qualified for the 2015 FIFA U-17 World Cup.

Tiebreakers

The teams are ranked according to points (3 points for a win, 1 point for a draw, 0 points for a loss). If tied on points, tiebreakers are applied in the following order:

1. Number of points obtained in games between the teams concerned;
2. Goal difference in games between the teams concerned;
3. Goals scored in games between the teams concerned;
4. Goal difference in all games;
5. Goals scored in all games;
6. Fair Play point system in which the number of yellow and red cards are evaluated;
7. Drawing of lots.

All times UTC+01:00.

=== Group A ===
Pos	Team	Pld	W	D	L	GF	GA	GD	Pts	Qualification
1	Nigeria	3	2	1	0	6	2	+4	7	Knockout stage and 2015 FIFA U-17 World Cup
2	Guinea	3	1	1	1	3	3	0	4	Knockout stage and 2015 FIFA U-17 World Cup
3	Zambia	3	1	0	2	3	5	−2	3	
4	Niger (H)	3	1	0	2	3	5	−2	3	

Source: CAF
(H) Hosts
15 February 2015
15:00

Niger	0–2	Nigeria
	Report	Osimhen 17'; Nwakali 28'

Stade Général Seyni Kountché, Niamey
Referee: Helder Martins de Carvalho (Angola)
15 February 2015
18:00

Guinea	1–0	Zambia
A. Touré 25'	Report

Stade Général Seyni Kountché, Niamey
Referee: Ali Mohamed Adelaïd (Comoros)

18 February 2015
16:00

Nigeria	1–1	Guinea
Nwakali 85' (pen.)	Report	Diallo 14' (pen.)

Stade Général Seyni Kountché, Niamey
Referee: Jean-Jacques Ndala (DR Congo)
18 February 2015
19:00

Zambia	2–1	Niger
Daka 6'; Museba 17'	Report	Gonda 66'

Stade Général Seyni Kountché, Niamey
Referee: Joaquin Esono Eyang (Equatorial Guinea)

21 February 2015
18:30

Niger	2–1	Guinea
Boubabcar 3'; Lara 40'	Report	Bangoura 28'

Stade Général Seyni Kountché, Niamey
Referee: Antoine Effa Essouma (Cameroon)
21 February 2015
18:30

Nigeria	3–1	Zambia
Osimhen 36', 48'; Nwakali 45+1'	Report	Daka 61'

Stade Municipal, Niamey
Referee: Mustapha Ghorbal (Algeria)

=== Group B ===
Pos	Team	Pld	W	D	L	GF	GA	GD	Pts	Qualification
1	Mali	3	2	1	0	6	3	+3	7	Knockout stage and 2015 FIFA U-17 World Cup
2	South Africa	3	1	2	0	7	5	+2	5	Knockout stage and 2015 FIFA U-17 World Cup
3	Ivory Coast	3	1	1	1	4	4	0	4	
4	Cameroon	3	0	0	3	3	8	−5	0	

Source: CAF
16 February 2015
16:00

Ivory Coast	2–2	South Africa
Kouao 75'; Doumbia 83'	Report	Mbatha 37'; Mayo 61'

Stade Municipal, Niamey
Referee: Denis Batte (Uganda)
16 February 2015
19:00

Mali	3–1	Cameroon
Sangaré 49'; Koita 79'; B. Traoré 89'	Report	Hongla 62'

Stade Municipal, Niamey
Referee: Mustapha Ghorbal (Algeria)

19 February 2015
16:00

South Africa	2–2	Mali
Mkatshana 74'; Mohamme 81'	Report	Maiga 18'; B. Traoré 60'

Stade Municipal, Niamey
Referee: Kokou Fagla (Togo)
19 February 2015
19:00

Cameroon	1–2	Ivory Coast
Bayemi 3'	Report	Kouadio 79'; Doumbia 85' (pen.)

Stade Municipal, Niamey
Referee: Noureddine El Jaafari (Morocco)

22 February 2015
16:30

Ivory Coast	0–1	Mali
	Report	B. Traoré 35'

Stade Municipal, Niamey
Referee: Helder Martins de Carvalho (Angola)
22 February 2015
16:30

South Africa	3–1	Cameroon
Achille 3' (o.g.); Maluleke 45' (pen.), 58'	Report	Bayemi 49'

Stade Général Seyni Kountché, Niamey
Referee: Ferdinand Udoh Aniete (Nigeria)

== Knockout stage ==
In the knockout stages, if a match is level at the end of normal playing time, kicks from the penalty mark are used to determine the winner (no extra time shall be played).

Semi-finals
25 February
Nigeria	0
South Africa	1
26 February
Mali	2
Guinea	1

Final
1 March
South Africa	0
Mali	2
Third place
1 March
Nigeria	1
Guinea	3

=== Semi-finals ===
25 February 2015
16:00

Nigeria	0–1	South Africa
	Report	Mayo 27'

Stade Général Seyni Kountché, Niamey
Referee: Noureddine El Jaafari (Morocco)

26 February 2015
16:00

Mali	2–1	Guinea
Koita 25'; Malle 53'	Report	A. Touré 51'

Stade Général Seyni Kountché, Niamey
Referee: Mustapha Ghorbal (Algeria)

=== Third place match ===
1 March 2015
16:00

Nigeria	1–3	Guinea
Osimhen 30'	Report	A. Touré 35'; Keita 40', 53'

Stade Général Seyni Kountché, Niamey
Referee: Gomno Daouda (Niger)

=== Final ===
1 March 2015
19:00

South Africa	0–2	Mali
	Report	Bagayoko 67'; Malle 79'

Stade Général Seyni Kountché, Niamey
Referee: Noureddine El Jaafari (Morocco)

== Goalscorers ==
4 goals

- (Nigeria) Victor Osimhen

3 goals

- (Guinea) Aboubacar Touré
- (Mali) Boubacar Traoré
- (Nigeria) Kelechi Nwakali

2 goals

- (Cameroon) Christian Bayemi
- (Guinea) Abdoulaye Jules Keita
- (Ivory Coast) Idrissa Doumbia
- (Mali) Sekou Koita
- (Mali) Aly Malle
- (South Africa) Nelson Maluleke
- (South Africa) Eric Mayo
- (Zambia) Patson Daka

1 goal

- (Cameroon) Martin Hongla
- (Ivory Coast) N'guessan Jonas Kouadio
- (Ivory Coast) Koffi Kouao
- (Guinea) Naby Bangoura
- (Guinea) Sam Diallo
- (Mali) Siaka Bagayoko
- (Mali) Sidiki Maiga
- (Mali) Mamadou Sangaré
- (Niger) Issoufou Boubabcar
- (Niger) Malick Saidou Gonda
- (Niger) Ismael Rabiou Lara
- (South Africa) Sibongakonke Mbatha
- (South Africa) Luvuyo Katlego Mkatshana
- (South Africa) Katlego Mohamme
- (Zambia) Wayne Museba

Own goal

- (Cameroon) Fokem Achille (against South Africa)

== See also ==
- 2015 African U-20 Championship
