= Marcelino Ñamandú =

Paraguayan footballer (born 1999)

Personal information
- Full name: Marcelino Nicolás Ñamandú Ojeda
- Date of birth: 28 July 1999 (age 27)
- Place of birth: Caacupé, Paraguay
- Height: 1.76 m (5 ft 9 in)
- Position: Midfielder

Team information
- Current team: Rubio Ñu

Youth career
- Rubio Ñu

Senior career*
| Years | Team | Apps | (Gls) |
| 2015–2018 | Rubio Ñu | 3 | (0) |
| 2018–2022 | Cerro Porteño | 9 | (1) |
| 2022 | → Deportivo Maldonado (loan) | 0 | (0) |
| 2022 | → General Caballero JLM (loan) | | |
| 2023 | Tacuary | 2 | (0) |
| 2024– | Rubio Ñu | 4 | (0) |

International career^{‡}
| 2015 | Paraguay U17 | 3 | (1) |
- * Club domestic league appearances and goals as of 27 June 2024 ‡ National team caps and goals as of 26 October 2015

Marcelino Nicolás Ñamandú Ojeda (born 28 July 1999) is a Paraguayan professional footballer who plays as a midfielder for Rubio Ñu.
