= Renan Foguinho =

Brazilian footballer

Personal information
- Full name: Renan Rodrigues da Silva
- Date of birth: 9 October 1989 (age 37)
- Place of birth: Londrina, Brazil
- Height: 1.81 m (5 ft 11 in)
- Position: Defensive midfielder

Youth career
- 2001–2004: Londrina
- 2004–2009: Atlético Paranaense

Senior career*
Years	Team	Apps	(Gls)
2009–2015	Atlético Paranaense	38	(0)
2010	→ Dinamo Minsk (loan)	10	(0)
2013–2014	→ Atlético Goianiense (loan)	23	(0)
2015	→ XV de Piracicaba (loan)	8	(1)
2015–2018	Adanaspor	79	(9)
2019–2020	Giresunspor	38	(0)
2020–2021	Náutico	7	(0)

International career
2009	Brazil U20	5	(0)
- * Club domestic league appearances and goals as of 30 January 2021

Renan Rodrigues da Silva, known as Renan Foguinho (born 9 October 1989) is a Brazilian former professional footballer who played as a defensive midfielder.

== Career statistics ==
(Correct as of 16 October 2010)

Club	Season	State League		Brazilian Série A		Copa do Brasil		Copa Libertadores		Copa Sudamericana		Total	
Club	Season	Apps	Goals	Apps	Goals	Apps	Goals	Apps	Goals	Apps	Goals	Apps	Goals
Atlético Paranaense	2008	-	-	14	0	-	-	-	-	3	0	17	0
Atlético Paranaense	2009	-	-	8	0	-	-	-	-	-	-	8	0
Atlético Paranaense	2011	0	0	4	0	-	-	-	-	2	0	6	0
Total		0	0	26	0	-	-	-	-	5	0	31	0
