= Hunter Ashworth =

American-born New Zealand footballer

Personal information
- Full name: Hunter Kelly Ashworth
- Date of birth: 8 January 1998 (age 28)
- Place of birth: Laguna Beach, California, United States
- Height: 1.95 m (6 ft 5 in)
- Position: Defender

Youth career
- 2011–2013: LA Galaxy
- 2013–2015: Pateadores

College career
Years	Team	Apps	(Gls)
2015–2017	San Francisco Dons	13	(0)
2018–2019	UC Santa Barbara Gauchos	34	(3)

Senior career*
Years	Team	Apps	(Gls)
2020	Pittsburgh Riverhounds	4	(0)
2021	San Diego Loyal	2	(0)

International career^{‡}
2015	New Zealand U17	3	(1)
2016–2017	New Zealand U20	9	(2)
2019–2020	New Zealand U23	3	(0)
- * Club domestic league appearances and goals as of 10 July 2021 ‡ National team caps and goals as of 12 July 2020

Hunter Kelly Ashworth (born 8 January 1998) is an American-born New Zealand footballer who plays as a defender.

== Career ==
=== Pittsburgh Riverhounds ===
Before the 2020 season, Ashworth was signed by the Pittsburgh Riverhounds of the USL Championship. He made his league debut for the club on 12 July 2020, starting in an away match against Louisville City.

=== San Diego Loyal ===
On 13 May 2021, Ashworth joined San Diego Loyal SC. He made his debut for the club the following day in a 3–1 defeat to the Tacoma Defiance.
