= List of Croatian football transfers summer 2014 =

This list includes all the transfers that took place in Croatian football in the summer of 2014.

For the transfers which took place before 1 July 2014, the player would join his new club in the said date. But for transfers after or on the date, the player will immediately join his new club.

== Prva HNL ==
=== Dinamo Zagreb ===
In: Note: Flags indicate national team as defined under FIFA eligibility rules; some limited exceptions apply. Players may hold more than one non-FIFA nationality.

No.	Pos.	Nation	Player
—	MF	BIH	Amer Gojak (from (Bosnia and Herzegovina) FK Olimpic)
14	FW	BIH	Armin Hodžić (from (Bosnia and Herzegovina) Željezničar Sarajevo)
—	FW	CRO	Dejan Radonjić (from Istra 1961)
—	MF	CRO	Tibor Halilović (promoted from Academy)
—	DF	CRO	Hrvoje Džijan (promoted from Academy)
22	MF	ARG	Leonardo Sigali (from (Argentina) Godoy Cruz)
10	MF	POR	Paulo Machado (from (Greece) Olympiacos)
—	MF	CRO	Marko Pjaca (from Lokomotiva)
34	GK	POR	Eduardo Carvalho (from (Italy) Genoa)
—	FW	ESP	Dani Olmo (from (Spain) FC Barcelona)
28	FW	POR	Wilson Eduardo (on loan from (Portugal) Sporting CP)

Out: Note: Flags indicate national team as defined under FIFA eligibility rules; some limited exceptions apply. Players may hold more than one non-FIFA nationality.

No.	Pos.	Nation	Player

=== Istra 1961 ===
In: Note: Flags indicate national team as defined under FIFA eligibility rules; some limited exceptions apply. Players may hold more than one non-FIFA nationality.

No.	Pos.	Nation	Player

Out: Note: Flags indicate national team as defined under FIFA eligibility rules; some limited exceptions apply. Players may hold more than one non-FIFA nationality.

No.	Pos.	Nation	Player
—	FW	CRO	Dejan Radonjić (to Dinamo Zagreb)

=== Lokomotiva Zagreb ===
In: Note: Flags indicate national team as defined under FIFA eligibility rules; some limited exceptions apply. Players may hold more than one non-FIFA nationality.

No.	Pos.	Nation	Player
—	MF	CMR	Mathias Chago (from (Iran) Foolad)

Out: Note: Flags indicate national team as defined under FIFA eligibility rules; some limited exceptions apply. Players may hold more than one non-FIFA nationality.

No.	Pos.	Nation	Player
