= Bennett Ofori =

Ghanaian footballer

Bennett Ofori Ansu
Personal information
- Full name: Bennett Ofori Ansu
- Date of birth: 11 September 1995 (age 31)
- Place of birth: Accra, Ghana
- Height: 1.84 m (6 ft 1/2 in)
- Position: Winger

Youth career
- 2011: Berekum Chelsea

Senior career*
Years	Team	Apps	(Gls)
2012	Berekum Arsenal		
2013	Berekum Chelsea		
2016	Asante Kotoko	23	(2)
2017	Medeama		
2019	Apolonia		

International career
	Ghana U-17		(2)
- * Club domestic league appearances and goals

Bennett Ofori Ansu (born 11 September 1995), is a Ghanaian footballer who plays as an attacking midfielder.

== Club career ==
Ofori joined Asante Kotoko on a three-year contract in 2016. He scored goals during the 2016 Ghanaian Premier League in 2–2 and 1–1 draws with Medeama and Inter-Allies, respectively.

After leaving Asante Kotoko, Ofori signed with Medeama in February 2017.
