= Boubacar Traoré (footballer, born 1998) =

Malian professional football player

Personal information
- Date of birth: 24 May 1998 (age 28)
- Place of birth: Bamako, Mali
- Height: 1.80 m (5 ft 11 in)
- Position: Forward

Team information
- Current team: AS Vita Club

Youth career
- 2017: Pyramids
- 2018: Wadi Degla

Senior career*
Years	Team	Apps	(Gls)
2016	Jeanne d'Arc		
2016–2017	Bakaridjan		
2018–2019	Adana Demirspor	3	(0)
2019	→ Elazığspor (loan)	5	(1)
2019–2020	Zimbru Chișinău	13	(2)
2020–2021	Naft Maysan		
2021–2022	Salitas FC		
2022–2023	Rayon Sports F.C.		
2024	Teungueth FC		
2024–	AS Vita Club		

International career
2015	Mali U17	7	(2)
2017	Mali U20	3	(0)
- * Club domestic league appearances and goals as of 12 April 2021

Boubacar Traoré (born 24 May 1998) is a Malian footballer who plays as a forward for DR Congolese club AS Vita Club.

== Club career ==
On the last day of the January transfer market 2019, Traoré was one of 22 players on two hours, that signed for Turkish club Elazığspor. The club had been placed under a transfer embargo but managed to negotiate it with the Turkish FA, leading to them going on a mad spree of signing and registering a load of players despite not even having a permanent manager in place. In just two hours, they managed to snap up a record 22 players - 12 coming in on permanent contracts and a further 10 joining on loan deals until the end of the season. He arrived on loan for the rest of the season.

In August 2019, Traoré signed for Moldovan National Division club Zimbru Chișinău.

In March 2021, he signed for Iraqi Premier League club Naft Maysan.

== Career statistics ==
=== Club ===
As of 12 April 2021

Club	Season	League			Cup		Continental		Other		Total	
Club	Season	Division	Apps	Goals	Apps	Goals	Apps	Goals	Apps	Goals	Apps	Goals
Adana Demirspor	2018–19	TFF First League	3	0	4	1	–		–		7	1
Elazığspor (loan)	2018–19	TFF First League	5	1	0	0	–		–		5	1
Zimbru Chișinău	2019	Moldovan National Division	8	2	0	0	–		–		8	2
Zimbru Chișinău	2020–21	Moldovan National Division	5	0	0	0	–		–		5	0
Zimbru Chișinău	Total		13	2	0	0	–		–		13	2
Career total			21	3	4	1	0	0	0	0	25	4
