= Karlo Majić =

Croatian footballer (born 1998)

Personal information
- Full name: Karlo Igor Majić
- Date of birth: 3 March 1998 (age 28)
- Place of birth: Zagreb, Croatia
- Height: 1.81 m (5 ft 11 in)
- Position: Centre-forward

Team information
- Current team: Trnje
- Number: 28

Youth career
- 2005-2008: Radnik Velika Gorica
- 2008: Zagreb
- 2009: Radnik Velika Gorica
- 2009–2012: Gorica
- 2012–2016: Dinamo Zagreb
- 2016–2017: Fortuna Düsseldorf

Senior career*
Years	Team	Apps	(Gls)
2016	Dinamo Zagreb II	7	(1)
2016–2019	Fortuna Düsseldorf II	30	(2)
2019	→ Krško (loan)	3	(0)
2019–2021	Sesvete	42	(7)
2021–2022	Rudeš	29	(3)
2022–2023	Croatia Zmijavci	32	(7)
2023	Kustošija	12	(3)
2024–	Trnje	13	(3)

International career^{‡}
2013–2014	Croatia U16	8	(0)
2014–2015	Croatia U17	19	(6)
2015	Croatia U18	6	(1)
2016–2017	Croatia U19	8	(2)
2018	Croatia U20	3	(0)
- * Club domestic league appearances and goals as of 6 June 2024 ‡ National team caps and goals as of 10:33, 13 September 2020 (UTC)

Karlo Igor Majić (born 3 March 1998) is a Croatian footballer who plays as a centre-forward for NK Trnje.

== Club career ==
Majić started practicing football at the age of 7 at the now-defunct Radnik in his hometown of Velika Gorica, where he played, apart from a short stint in 2008 at NK Zagreb, until the club was disbanded and merged with HNK Gorica, which he joined in 2009. At the age of 14, he was scouted by GNK Dinamo Zagreb and joined their academy. In 2016, he joined the U-19 team of Fortuna Düsseldorf, earning a three-year professional contract with the club in July 2017, having scored 16 goals in 25 games.

After a year and a half playing for Fortuna's reserve team, Majić was loaned out to Krško in the Slovenian PrvaLiga. He made his professional debut for the club on 24 February 2019, coming on as a substitute in the 73rd minute for Sandi Ogrinec in the home match against Olimpija Ljubljana, which finished as a 1–4 loss.
