= 2015 FIFA U-17 World Cup squads =

The following is a list of all the squads of the national teams participating in the 2015 FIFA U-17 World Cup.

Each team had to name a squad of 21 players (three of whom must be goalkeepers) by the FIFA deadline. The squads were announced on 8 October 2015.

All players of its representative team must have been born on or after 1 January 1998. Players in boldface have been capped at full international level at some point in their career.

== Group A ==
=== Chile ===
Head coach: (Chile) Miguel Ponce

No.	Pos.	Player	Date of birth (age)	Caps	Goals	Club
1	GK	Luis Ureta	8 March 1999 (aged 16)			(Football Federation of Chile) O'Higgins
2	DF	Simón Ramírez	3 November 1998 (aged 16)			(Football Federation of Chile) Huachipato
3	DF	Fabián Monilla	20 May 1998 (aged 17)			(Football Federation of Chile) Universidad Católica
4	MF	Manuel Reyes	8 January 1998 (aged 17)			(Football Federation of Chile) Universidad Católica
5	DF	Diego González	29 April 1998 (aged 17)			(Football Federation of Chile) O'Higgins
6	MF	**Ignacio Saavedra**	12 January 1999 (aged 16)			(Football Federation of Chile) Universidad Católica
7	MF	Gonzalo Jara	1 December 1998 (aged 16)			(Football Federation of Chile) Universidad Católica
8	MF	**Yerko Leiva**	14 June 1998 (aged 17)			(Football Federation of Chile) Universidad de Chile
9	FW	Gabriel Mazuela	30 January 1999 (aged 16)			(Football Federation of Chile) Universidad de Chile
10	MF	**Marcelo Allende**	7 April 1999 (aged 16)			(Football Federation of Chile) Cobreloa
11	FW	Mathías Pinto	13 July 1998 (aged 17)			(Football Federation of Chile) Universidad de Chile
12	GK	Ignacio Azúa	23 June 1998 (aged 17)			(Football Federation of Chile) Universidad de Chile
13	DF	Camilo Moya	19 February 1998 (aged 17)			(Football Federation of Chile) Universidad de Chile
14	MF	Luciano Díaz	8 May 1998 (aged 17)			(Football Federation of Chile) Colo-Colo
15	MF	René Meléndez	19 November 1998 (aged 16)			(Football Federation of Chile) Audax Italiano
16	MF	Brian Leiva	21 February 1998 (aged 17)			(Football Federation of Chile) Universidad Católica
17	DF	Diego Soto	22 October 1998 (aged 16)			(Football Federation of Chile) Universidad de Concepción
18	FW	Walter Ponce	4 March 1998 (aged 17)			(Football Federation of Chile) Palestino
19	FW	Luis Salas	30 March 1998 (aged 17)			(Football Federation of Chile) Colo-Colo
20	DF	Juan José Soriano	12 January 1998 (aged 17)			(Football Federation of Chile) Universidad Católica
21	GK	**Zacarías López**	30 June 1998 (aged 17)			(Football Federation of Chile) San Marcos

=== Croatia ===
Head coach: (Croatia) Dario Bašić

No.	Pos.	Player	Date of birth (age)	Caps	Goals	Club
1	GK	Adrian Šemper	12 January 1998 (aged 17)			(Croatian Football Federation) Dinamo Zagreb
2	DF	Matej Hudećek	27 December 1998 (aged 16)			(Croatian Football Federation) Dinamo Zagreb
3	DF	**Borna Sosa**	21 January 1998 (aged 17)			(Croatian Football Federation) Dinamo Zagreb
4	DF	**Martin Erlić**	24 January 1998 (aged 17)			(Italian Football Federation) Sassuolo
5	DF	Branimir Kalaica	1 June 1998 (aged 17)			(Croatian Football Federation) Dinamo Zagreb
6	DF	Vinko Soldo	15 February 1998 (aged 17)			(Croatian Football Federation) Dinamo Zagreb
7	MF	**Josip Brekalo**	23 June 1998 (aged 17)			(Croatian Football Federation) Dinamo Zagreb
8	MF	Neven Đurasek	15 August 1998 (aged 17)			(Croatian Football Federation) Dinamo Zagreb
9	FW	Karlo Majić	3 March 1998 (aged 17)			(Croatian Football Federation) Dinamo Zagreb
10	MF	**Nikola Moro**	12 March 1998 (aged 17)			(Croatian Football Federation) Dinamo Zagreb
11	MF	Davor Lovren	3 October 1998 (aged 17)			(Croatian Football Federation) Dinamo Zagreb
12	GK	Bruno Šutalo	23 May 1998 (aged 17)			(Croatian Football Federation) Hajduk Split
13	MF	**Luka Ivanušec**	26 November 1998 (aged 16)			(Croatian Football Federation) Lokomotiva
14	DF	Marin Karamarko	14 April 1998 (aged 17)			(Croatian Football Federation) OSK Otok
15	DF	Marin Šverko	4 February 1998 (aged 17)			(German Football Association) Karlsruher SC
16	DF	Marko Đira	5 May 1999 (aged 16)			(Croatian Football Federation) Dinamo Zagreb
17	FW	Matko Babić	28 July 1998 (aged 17)			(Croatian Football Federation) Lokomotiva
18	DF	Luka Pasariček	12 March 1998 (aged 17)			(Croatian Football Federation) Dinamo Zagreb
19	FW	Ivan Delić	29 September 1998 (aged 17)			(Croatian Football Federation) Hajduk Split
20	MF	Dino Halilović	8 February 1998 (aged 17)			(Italian Football Federation) Udinese
21	GK	Ivan Nevistić	31 July 1998 (aged 17)			(Croatian Football Federation) Rijeka

=== Nigeria ===
Head coach: (Nigeria) Emmanuel Amunike

No.	Pos.	Player	Date of birth (age)	Caps	Goals	Club
1	GK	**Akpan David Udoh** (Note: Capped for Uganda)	18 July 1999 (aged 16)			(Nigeria Football Federation) Remo Academy
2	DF	Lazarus John	6 June 1998 (aged 17)			(Nigeria Football Federation) Fosla Academy
3	DF	Tobechukwu Ibe	17 June 1998 (aged 17)			(Nigeria Football Federation) Siaone Academy
4	MF	David Enogela	4 February 1998 (aged 17)			(Nigeria Football Federation) Young Stars FC
5	DF	Lukman Zakari	23 December 1998 (aged 16)			(Nigeria Football Federation) Unity Academy
6	MF	**Kingsley Michael**	26 August 1999 (aged 16)			(Nigeria Football Federation) Abuja
7	FW	Funsho Bamgboye	9 January 1999 (aged 16)			(Qatar Football Association) Aspire Academy
8	MF	**Samuel Chukwueze**	22 May 1999 (aged 16)			(Nigeria Football Federation) Diamond Academy
9	FW	**Victor Osimhen**	29 December 1998 (aged 16)			(Nigeria Football Federation) Ultimate Strikers Academy
10	MF	**Kelechi Nwakali**	5 June 1998 (aged 17)			(Nigeria Football Federation) Diamond Academy
11	MF	Chinedu Madueke	5 August 1998 (aged 17)			(Nigeria Football Federation) Virgin Kids FC
12	MF	Chukwudi Agor	26 November 1998 (aged 16)			(Nigeria Football Federation) ASJ Academy
13	MF	Joel Osikel	17 June 1998 (aged 17)			(Nigeria Football Federation) Young Eleven FC
14	DF	Ejike Ikwu	15 February 1999 (aged 16)			(Nigeria Football Federation) Starplus FC
15	FW	Udochukwu Anumudu	9 October 1998 (aged 17)			(Nigeria Football Federation) Enyi Academy
16	GK	Amos Innocent Benjamin	22 December 1998 (aged 16)			(Nigeria Football Federation) Abuja
17	FW	Christian Ebere	4 April 1998 (aged 17)			(Nigeria Football Federation) ASJ Academy
18	MF	Edidiong Essien	26 November 1999 (aged 15)			(Nigeria Football Federation) Rapture Academy
19	FW	Sunday Alimi	7 October 1999 (aged 16)			(Nigeria Football Federation) Topworld FC
20	FW	Orji Okwonkwo	19 January 1998 (aged 17)			(Nigeria Football Federation) Abuja
21	GK	Chisom Chiaha	2 February 1998 (aged 17)			(Nigeria Football Federation) Apapa Golden Stars

=== United States ===
Head coach: (United States) Richie Williams

No.	Pos.	Player	Date of birth (age)	Caps	Goals	Club
1	GK	Will Pulisic	16 April 1998 (aged 17)			(United States Soccer Federation) Richmond United
2	DF	**Matthew Olosunde**	7 March 1998 (aged 17)			(United States Soccer Federation) New York Red Bulls
3	DF	John Nelson	11 July 1998 (aged 17)			(United States Soccer Federation) Internationals
4	DF	**Auston Trusty**	12 August 1998 (aged 17)			(United States Soccer Federation) Philadelphia Union
5	DF	Hugo Arellano	5 March 1998 (aged 17)			(United States Soccer Federation) LA Galaxy
6	MF	**Eric Calvillo** (Note: Capped for El Salvador)	2 January 1998 (aged 17)			(United States Soccer Federation) Real So Cal
7	FW	**Haji Wright**	27 March 1998 (aged 17)			(United States Soccer Federation) New York Cosmos
8	MF	**Luca de la Torre**	23 May 1998 (aged 17)			(The Football Association) Fulham
9	FW	Joe Gallardo	1 January 1998 (aged 17)			(Mexican Football Federation) Monterrey
10	MF	**Christian Pulisic**	18 September 1998 (aged 17)			(German Football Association) Borussia Dortmund
11	FW	**Joshua Pérez**	21 January 1998 (aged 17)			(Italian Football Federation) Fiorentina
12	GK	Kevin Silva	5 January 1998 (aged 17)			(United States Soccer Federation) Players Development Academy
13	DF	Alexis Velela	17 April 1998 (aged 17)			(United States Soccer Federation) San Diego Surf
14	DF	Tanner Dieterich	4 May 1998 (aged 17)			(United States Soccer Federation) Real Salt Lake
15	DF	Danny Barbir	31 January 1998 (aged 17)			(The Football Association) West Bromwich Albion
16	MF	Tommy McCabe	4 April 1998 (aged 17)			(United States Soccer Federation) Players Development Academy
17	FW	Pierre da Silva	28 July 1998 (aged 17)			(United States Soccer Federation) Orlando City
18	DF	**Tyler Adams**	14 February 1999 (aged 16)			(United States Soccer Federation) New York Red Bulls II
19	FW	**Brandon Vázquez**	14 October 1998 (aged 17)			(Mexican Football Federation) Tijuana
20	MF	**Alejandro Zendejas** (Note: Also capped for Mexico)	7 February 1998 (aged 17)			(United States Soccer Federation) FC Dallas
21	GK	Eric Lopez	5 March 1999 (aged 16)			(United States Soccer Federation) LA Galaxy

== Group B ==
=== Brazil ===
Head coach: (Brazil) Carlos Amadeu

No.	Pos.	Player	Date of birth (age)	Caps	Goals	Club
1	GK	Juliano	14 March 1998 (aged 17)			(Brazilian Football Confederation) Atlético Paranaense
2	DF	Kléber	2 August 1998 (aged 17)			(Brazilian Football Confederation) Flamengo
3	DF	Ronaldo	12 January 1998 (aged 17)			(Brazilian Football Confederation) Cruzeiro
4	DF	Léo Santos	9 December 1998 (aged 16)			(Brazilian Football Confederation) Corinthians
5	MF	Liziero	7 February 1998 (aged 17)			(Brazilian Football Confederation) São Paulo
6	DF	Rogério	13 January 1998 (aged 17)			(Brazilian Football Confederation) Internacional
7	FW	Leandrinho	11 October 1998 (aged 17)			(Brazilian Football Confederation) Ponte Preta
8	MF	Andrey	15 February 1998 (aged 17)			(Brazilian Football Confederation) Vasco da Gama
9	FW	Luís Henrique	17 March 1998 (aged 17)			(Brazilian Football Confederation) Botafogo
10	FW	Evander	9 June 1998 (aged 17)			(Brazilian Football Confederation) Vasco da Gama
11	MF	Lincoln	7 November 1998 (aged 16)			(Brazilian Football Confederation) Grêmio
12	GK	Lucas Romão	29 January 1998 (aged 17)			(Brazilian Football Confederation) Cruzeiro
13	DF	Dodô	17 November 1998 (aged 16)			(Brazilian Football Confederation) Coritiba
14	DF	**Éder Militão**	18 January 1998 (aged 17)			(Brazilian Football Confederation) São Paulo
15	DF	Zé Marcos	1 February 1998 (aged 17)			(Brazilian Football Confederation) Atlético Paranaense
16	MF	Guilherme	12 July 1998 (aged 17)			(Brazilian Football Confederation) Santos
17	MF	Geovane	15 May 1998 (aged 17)			(Brazilian Football Confederation) Vitória
18	MF	Matheusinho	11 February 1998 (aged 17)			(Brazilian Football Confederation) América-MG
19	FW	Arthur	3 July 1998 (aged 17)			(Brazilian Football Confederation) Santos
20	FW	Eron	16 July 1998 (aged 17)			(Brazilian Football Confederation) Vitória
21	GK	Gabriel Batista	3 June 1998 (aged 17)			(Brazilian Football Confederation) Flamengo

=== England ===
Head coach: (England) Neil Dewsnip

No.	Pos.	Player	Date of birth (age)	Caps	Goals	Club
1	GK	Paul Woolston	14 August 1998 (aged 17)			(The Football Association) Newcastle United
2	DF	James Yates	3 April 1998 (aged 17)			(The Football Association) Everton
3	DF	**Jay Dasilva**	22 April 1998 (aged 17)			(The Football Association) Chelsea
4	MF	Tom Davies	30 June 1998 (aged 17)			(The Football Association) Everton
5	DF	Danny Collinge	9 April 1998 (aged 17)			(German Football Association) VfB Stuttgart
6	DF	Ro-Shaun Williams	3 September 1998 (aged 17)			(The Football Association) Manchester United
7	MF	Will Patching	18 October 1998 (aged 16)			(The Football Association) Manchester City
8	MF	Marcus Wood	12 February 1998 (aged 17)			(The Football Association) Manchester City
9	FW	Kaylen Hinds	28 January 1998 (aged 17)			(The Football Association) Arsenal
10	MF	Marcus Edwards	20 December 1998 (aged 16)			(The Football Association) Tottenham Hotspur
11	MF	Chris Willock	31 January 1998 (aged 17)			(The Football Association) Arsenal
12	DF	Tayo Edun	14 May 1998 (aged 17)			(The Football Association) Fulham
13	GK	Will Huffer	30 October 1998 (aged 16)			(The Football Association) Leeds United
14	MF	**Trent Alexander-Arnold**	7 October 1998 (aged 17)			(The Football Association) Liverpool
15	DF	**Easah Suliman** (Note: Capped for Pakistan)	26 January 1998 (aged 17)			(The Football Association) Aston Villa
16	FW	Stephy Mavididi	31 May 1998 (aged 17)			(The Football Association) Arsenal
17	FW	Kazaiah Sterling	9 November 1998 (aged 16)			(The Football Association) Tottenham Hotspur
18	MF	Herbie Kane	23 November 1998 (aged 16)			(The Football Association) Liverpool
19	FW	**Iké Ugbo** (Note: Capped for Canada)	12 September 1998 (aged 17)			(The Football Association) Chelsea
20	FW	Rushian Hepburn-Murphy	24 August 1998 (aged 17)			(The Football Association) Aston Villa
21	GK	Alfie Whiteman	2 October 1998 (aged 17)			(The Football Association) Tottenham Hotspur

=== Guinea ===
Head coach: (Guinea) Hamidou Camara

No.	Pos.	Player	Date of birth (age)	Caps	Goals	Club
1	GK	**Moussa Camara**	27 November 1998 (aged 16)			(Guinean Football Federation) Milo FC
2	DF	Mohamed Kourouma	8 March 1998 (aged 17)			(Guinean Football Federation) Alde & Action
3	DF	Fodé Camara	17 April 1998 (aged 17)			(Guinean Football Federation) Cefomig
4	DF	Moussa Soumah	1 January 1998 (aged 17)			(Guinean Football Federation) Cefomig
5	DF	Mohamed Camara	1 November 1998 (aged 16)			(Guinean Football Federation) Fello Star
6	MF	Alseny Soumah	16 May 1998 (aged 17)			(Guinean Football Federation) FC Attouga
7	MF	**Morlaye Sylla**	27 July 1998 (aged 17)			(Guinean Football Federation) Espoirs Tanene
8	MF	Augustin Bangoura	13 June 1998 (aged 17)			(French Football Federation) AS Saint-Etienne
9	FW	Karim Conté	25 August 1999 (aged 16)			(Qatar Football Association) Aspire Academy
10	FW	Naby Bangoura	19 March 1998 (aged 17)			(Guinean Football Federation) Falessade
11	MF	**Jules Keita**	20 July 1998 (aged 17)			(Guinean Football Federation) FC Attouga
12	DF	Amine Traoré	15 January 1999 (aged 16)			(Guinean Football Federation) FC Yaya
13	MF	Ives Camara	17 May 1999 (aged 16)			(Guinean Football Federation) FC Attouga
14	FW	Yamadou Touré	5 August 1998 (aged 17)			(Guinean Football Federation) Alde & Action
15	MF	Alhassane Soumah	23 October 1999 (aged 15)			(Qatar Football Association) Aspire Academy
16	GK	Djibril Yattara	10 March 1998 (aged 17)			(Guinean Football Federation) Athlético de Coléah
17	DF	Aboubacar Touré	14 June 1998 (aged 17)			(Guinean Football Federation) Academie Kabassan
18	MF	Junior Doumbouya	16 February 1999 (aged 16)			(Guinean Football Federation) Horoya AC
19	FW	Sam Diallo	28 April 1998 (aged 17)			(Guinean Football Federation) FC Attouga
20	FW	**Ousmane Camara**	28 December 1998 (aged 16)			(Guinean Football Federation) FC Attouga
21	GK	Fodé Conté	15 March 1998 (aged 17)			(Guinean Football Federation) AS Bora

=== South Korea ===
Head coach: (South Korea) Choi Jin-cheul

No.	Pos.	Player	Date of birth (age)	Caps	Goals	Club
1	GK	Ahn Joon-soo	28 January 1998 (aged 17)			(Korea Football Association) Uijeongbu FC
2	DF	Park Myeong-su	11 January 1998 (aged 17)			(Korea Football Association) Incheon United
3	DF	Park Dae-won	25 February 1998 (aged 17)			(Korea Football Association) Suwon Samsung Bluewings
4	DF	Lee Sang-min	1 January 1998 (aged 17)			(Korea Football Association) Ulsan Hyundai
5	DF	Choi Jae-young	18 March 1998 (aged 17)			(Korea Football Association) Pohang Steelers
6	MF	Jang Jae-won	21 April 1998 (aged 17)			(Korea Football Association) Ulsan Hyundai
7	MF	Park Sang-hyeok	20 April 1998 (aged 17)			(Korea Football Association) Suwon Samsung Bluewings
8	FW	Lee Sang-heon	26 February 1998 (aged 17)			(Korea Football Association) Ulsan Hyundai
9	FW	You Ju-an	1 October 1998 (aged 17)			(Korea Football Association) Suwon Samsung Bluewings
10	FW	**Lee Seung-woo**	6 January 1998 (aged 17)			(Royal Spanish Football Federation) Barcelona B
11	MF	Cha Oh-yeon	15 April 1998 (aged 17)			(Korea Football Association) FC Seoul
12	DF	Hwang Tae-hyeon	29 January 1999 (aged 16)			(Korea Football Association) Jeonnam Dragons
13	MF	Yu Seung-min	24 September 1998 (aged 17)			(Korea Football Association) Jeonbuk Hyundai Motors
14	MF	Kim Jin-ya	30 June 1998 (aged 17)			(Korea Football Association) Incheon United
15	DF	Kim Seung-woo	25 March 1998 (aged 17)			(Korea Football Association) Boin High School
16	DF	**Yoon Jong-gyu**	20 March 1998 (aged 17)			(Korea Football Association) Shingal High School
17	MF	**Kim Jung-min**	13 November 1999 (aged 15)			(Korea Football Association) Gwangju FC
18	GK	Lee Joon-seo	7 March 1998 (aged 17)			(Korea Football Association) FC Seoul
19	DF	Lee Seung-mo	30 March 1998 (aged 17)			(Korea Football Association) Pohang Steelers
20	FW	**Oh Se-hun**	15 January 1999 (aged 16)			(Korea Football Association) Ulsan Hyundai
21	GK	Lee Ju-hyun	6 December 1998 (aged 16)			(Korea Football Association) Tongjin High School

== Group C ==
=== Argentina ===
Head coach: (Argentina) Miguel Lemme

No.	Pos.	Player	Date of birth (age)	Caps	Goals	Club
1	GK	Franco Petroli	11 June 1998 (aged 17)			(Argentine Football Association) River Plate
2	DF	Julián Ferreyra	22 April 1998 (aged 17)			(Argentine Football Association) Argentinos Juniors
3	DF	Luis Olivera	24 October 1998 (aged 16)			(Argentine Football Association) River Plate
4	DF	Matías Escudero	27 December 1998 (aged 16)			(Argentine Football Association) Racing Club
5	MF	Julián Chicco	13 January 1998 (aged 17)			(Argentine Football Association) Boca Juniors
6	DF	Facundo Pardo	12 August 1998 (aged 17)			(Argentine Football Association) Newell's Old Boys
7	MF	Gianluca Mancuso	3 February 1998 (aged 17)			(Argentine Football Association) Vélez Sarsfield
8	MF	Pablo Ruiz	20 December 1998 (aged 16)			(Argentine Football Association) San Lorenzo
9	FW	Federico Vietto	30 March 1998 (aged 17)			(Argentine Football Association) Racing Club
10	MF	**Exequiel Palacios**	5 October 1998 (aged 17)			(Argentine Football Association) River Plate
11	FW	Lucas Ferraz	18 February 1998 (aged 17)			(Argentine Football Association) River Plate
12	GK	Federico Bonansea	13 March 1998 (aged 17)			(Argentine Football Association) Belgrano
13	DF	**David Martínez**	21 January 1998 (aged 17)			(Argentine Football Association) River Plate
14	DF	Tiago Ruíz Díaz	24 July 1998 (aged 17)			(Argentine Football Association) Newell's Old Boys
15	DF	Juan Antonio Di Lorenzo	6 July 1998 (aged 17)			(Argentine Football Association) Independiente
16	MF	Lucas Pizzatti	13 September 1998 (aged 17)			(Argentine Football Association) Argentinos Juniors
17	FW	**Germán Berterame**	13 November 1998 (aged 16)			(Argentine Football Association) San Lorenzo
18	FW	Tomás Conechny	30 March 1998 (aged 17)			(Argentine Football Association) San Lorenzo
19	FW	Matías Roskopf	14 January 1998 (aged 17)			(Argentine Football Association) Boca Juniors
20	FW	Ricardo Rodríguez	10 May 1998 (aged 17)			(Football Federation of Chile) Universidad Católica
21	GK	Marcos Peano	15 October 1998 (aged 17)			(Argentine Football Association) Unión de Santa Fe

=== Australia ===
Head coach: Tony Vidmar

No.	Pos.	Player	Date of birth (age)	Caps	Goals	Club
1	GK	Duro Dragicevic	7 July 1999 (aged 16)			(Football Australia) FFA COE
2	DF	Malcolm Ward	26 August 1999 (aged 16)			(Football Australia) FFA COE
3	DF	Aaron Reardon	11 March 1999 (aged 16)			(Football Australia) FFA COE
4	DF	**Kye Rowles**	19 May 1998 (aged 17)			(Football Australia) FFA COE
5	MF	Jackson Bandiera	16 April 1998 (aged 17)			(Football Australia) FFA COE
6	MF	Joe Caletti	14 September 1998 (aged 17)			(Football Australia) FFA COE
7	MF	Panos Armenakas	5 August 1998 (aged 17)			(Italian Football Federation) Udinese
8	MF	Jake Brimmer	3 April 1998 (aged 17)			(The Football Association) Liverpool
9	FW	Pierce Waring	18 November 1998 (aged 16)			(Football Australia) Melbourne Victory
10	MF	Josh Hope	7 January 1998 (aged 17)			(Football Australia) FFA COE
11	FW	Lucas Derrick	3 November 1998 (aged 16)			(Football Australia) Melbourne Victory
12	GK	Nicholas Sorras	15 June 1998 (aged 17)			(Football Australia) Central Coast Mariners
13	FW	Thomas Prinsen	1 May 1999 (aged 16)			(Royal Dutch Football Association) PEC Zwolle
14	MF	Joshua Laws	26 February 1998 (aged 17)			(German Football Association) Fortuna Düsseldorf
15	FW	Cameron Joice	21 September 1998 (aged 17)			(Football Australia) FFA COE
16	DF	Jonathan Vakirtzis	12 April 1998 (aged 17)			(Football Australia) Melbourne Victory
17	MF	Nicholas Panetta	22 April 1998 (aged 17)			(Football Australia) FFA COE
18	GK	James Delianov	20 October 1999 (aged 15)			(Football Australia) FFA COE
19	MF	Charlie Devereux	31 March 1998 (aged 17)			(Football Australia) FFA COE
20	DF	Perry Fotakopoulos	6 September 1998 (aged 17)			(Football Australia) FFA COE
21	FW	**Daniel Arzani**	4 January 1999 (aged 16)			(Football Australia) FFA COE

=== Germany ===
Head coach: (Germany) Christian Wück

No.	Pos.	Player	Date of birth (age)	Caps	Goals	Club
1	GK	Constantin Frommann	27 May 1998 (aged 17)			(German Football Association) SC Freiburg
2	MF	Felix Passlack	29 May 1998 (aged 17)			(German Football Association) Borussia Dortmund
3	DF	**Dženis Burnić**	22 May 1998 (aged 17)			(German Football Association) Borussia Dortmund
4	MF	Gökhan Gül	17 July 1998 (aged 17)			(German Football Association) VfL Bochum
5	DF	Erdinc Karakas	23 March 1998 (aged 17)			(German Football Association) VfL Bochum
6	DF	**Joel Abu Hanna** (Note: Capped for Israel)	22 January 1998 (aged 17)			(German Football Association) Bayer Leverkusen
7	MF	Dennis Geiger	10 June 1998 (aged 17)			(German Football Association) 1899 Hoffenheim
8	MF	Niklas Dorsch	15 January 1998 (aged 17)			(German Football Association) Bayern Munich
9	FW	Johannes Eggestein	8 May 1998 (aged 17)			(German Football Association) Werder Bremen
10	MF	Niklas Schmidt	1 March 1998 (aged 17)			(German Football Association) Werder Bremen
11	FW	Mats Köhlert	2 May 1998 (aged 17)			(German Football Association) Hamburger SV
12	GK	Markus Schubert	12 June 1998 (aged 17)			(German Football Association) Dynamo Dresden
13	DF	Daniel Nesseler	15 March 1998 (aged 17)			(German Football Association) Bayer Leverkusen
14	MF	Görkem Sağlam	11 April 1998 (aged 17)			(German Football Association) VfL Bochum
15	MF	**Salih Özcan** (Note: Capped for Turkey)	11 January 1998 (aged 17)			(German Football Association) 1. FC Köln
16	DF	Dominik Franke	5 October 1998 (aged 17)			(German Football Association) RB Leipzig
17	DF	Enes Akyol	16 February 1998 (aged 17)			(German Football Association) Hertha BSC
18	DF	Jonas Busam	3 May 1998 (aged 17)			(German Football Association) SC Freiburg
19	FW	Meris Skenderović	28 March 1998 (aged 17)			(German Football Association) 1899 Hoffenheim
20	MF	Vitaly Janelt	10 May 1998 (aged 17)			(German Football Association) RB Leipzig
21	GK	Finn Dahmen	27 March 1998 (aged 17)			(German Football Association) Mainz 05

=== Mexico ===
Head coach: (Mexico) Mario Arteaga

No.	Pos.	Player	Date of birth (age)	Caps	Goals	Club
1	GK	Joel García	12 April 1998 (aged 17)			(Mexican Football Federation) Santos Laguna
2	DF	Diego Cortés	18 June 1998 (aged 17)			(Mexican Football Federation) Guadalajara
3	DF	**Joaquín Esquivel**	7 January 1998 (aged 17)			(Mexican Football Federation) Zacatecas
4	DF	**Francisco Venegas**	16 July 1998 (aged 17)			(Mexican Football Federation) Pachuca
5	DF	Ulises Torres	17 February 1998 (aged 17)			(Mexican Football Federation) América
6	MF	**Alan Cervantes**	17 January 1998 (aged 17)			(Mexican Football Federation) Guadalajara
7	DF	Edwin Lara	8 September 1999 (aged 16)			(Mexican Football Federation) Pachuca
8	MF	Pablo López	7 January 1998 (aged 17)			(Mexican Football Federation) Pachuca
9	FW	**Eduardo Aguirre**	3 August 1998 (aged 17)			(Mexican Football Federation) Santos Laguna
10	FW	Claudio Zamudio	30 March 1998 (aged 17)			(Mexican Football Federation) Morelia
11	MF	Kevin Magaña	1 February 1998 (aged 17)			(Mexican Football Federation) Guadalajara
12	GK	Fernando Hernández	2 January 1998 (aged 17)			(Mexican Football Federation) Monterrey
13	DF	Bryan Salazar	25 February 1998 (aged 17)			(Mexican Football Federation) Guadalajara
14	DF	Brayton Vázquez	5 March 1998 (aged 17)			(Mexican Football Federation) Atlas
15	MF	Kevin Lara	18 April 1998 (aged 17)			(Mexican Football Federation) Santos Laguna
16	MF	Javier Ibarra	6 February 1998 (aged 17)			(Mexican Football Federation) Monterrey
17	MF	Nahum Gómez	19 January 1998 (aged 17)			(Mexican Football Federation) Pachuca
18	MF	Fernando Escalante	6 January 1998 (aged 17)			(Mexican Football Federation) Pachuca
19	FW	Ricardo Marín	18 March 1998 (aged 17)			(Mexican Football Federation) América
20	FW	José Gurrola	15 April 1998 (aged 17)			(Mexican Football Federation) Guadalajara
21	GK	Abraham Romero	18 February 1998 (aged 17)			(United States Soccer Federation) LA Galaxy

== Group D ==
=== Belgium ===
Head coach: (Belgium) Bob Browaeys

No.	Pos.	Player	Date of birth (age)	Caps	Goals	Club
1	GK	Jens Teunckens	30 January 1998 (aged 17)			(Royal Belgian Football Association) Club Brugge
2	DF	Kino Delorge	5 January 1998 (aged 17)			(Royal Belgian Football Association) Genk
3	DF	Rubin Seigers	11 January 1998 (aged 17)			(Royal Belgian Football Association) Genk
4	DF	**Wout Faes**	3 April 1998 (aged 17)			(Royal Belgian Football Association) Anderlecht
5	DF	Christophe Janssens	9 March 1998 (aged 17)			(Royal Belgian Football Association) Club Brugge
6	MF	Matisse Thuys	24 January 1998 (aged 17)			(Royal Belgian Football Association) Genk
7	FW	**Dante Vanzeir**	16 April 1998 (aged 17)			(Royal Belgian Football Association) Genk
8	MF	Dante Rigo	11 December 1998 (aged 16)			(Royal Dutch Football Association) PSV Eindhoven
9	FW	Dennis Van Vaerenbergh	26 June 1998 (aged 17)			(Royal Belgian Football Association) Club Brugge
10	MF	Alper Ademoğlu	10 April 1998 (aged 17)			(Royal Belgian Football Association) Anderlecht
11	MF	Ismail Azzaoui	6 January 1998 (aged 17)			(German Football Association) VfL Wolfsburg
12	GK	Gaëtan Coucke	3 November 1998 (aged 16)			(Royal Belgian Football Association) Genk
13	DF	Dries Caignau	8 January 1998 (aged 17)			(Royal Belgian Football Association) Gent
14	DF	Laurent Lemoine	24 April 1998 (aged 17)			(Royal Belgian Football Association) Club Brugge
15	DF	Steve Ryckaert	29 June 1998 (aged 17)			(Royal Belgian Football Association) Gent
16	MF	**Orel Mangala**	18 March 1998 (aged 17)			(Royal Belgian Football Association) Anderlecht
17	MF	Lennerd Daneels	10 April 1998 (aged 17)			(Royal Dutch Football Association) PSV Eindhoven
18	MF	Matthias Verreth	20 February 1998 (aged 17)			(Royal Dutch Football Association) PSV Eindhoven
19	FW	Jorn Vancamp	28 October 1998 (aged 16)			(Royal Belgian Football Association) Anderlecht
20	FW	Terry Osei-Berkoe	9 January 1998 (aged 17)			(Royal Belgian Football Association) Club Brugge
21	GK	Steph Van Cauwenberge	19 May 1998 (aged 17)			(Royal Belgian Football Association) Club Brugge

=== Ecuador ===
Head coach: (Ecuador) José Rodríguez

No.	Pos.	Player	Date of birth (age)	Caps	Goals	Club
1	GK	José Cevallos	19 March 1998 (aged 17)			(Ecuadorian Football Federation) LDU Quito
2	DF	Joan Cortez	13 January 1998 (aged 17)			(Ecuadorian Football Federation) Norte América
3	DF	Joel Quintero	25 September 1998 (aged 17)			(Ecuadorian Football Federation) Emelec
4	DF	Kevin Minda	21 November 1998 (aged 16)			(Ecuadorian Football Federation) LDU Quito
5	MF	Juan Nazareno	18 August 1998 (aged 17)			(Ecuadorian Football Federation) Independiente del Valle
6	DF	Jhonner Montezuma	11 January 1998 (aged 17)			(Ecuadorian Football Federation) Norte América
7	FW	**Washington Corozo**	9 July 1998 (aged 17)			(Ecuadorian Football Federation) Independiente del Valle
8	MF	Janus Vivar	7 September 1998 (aged 17)			(Ecuadorian Football Federation) Norte América
9	FW	Angel Vasquez	12 March 1998 (aged 17)			(Ecuadorian Football Federation) Barcelona
10	MF	Yeison Guerrero	21 April 1998 (aged 17)			(Ecuadorian Football Federation) Independiente del Valle
11	FW	Jhon Pereira	3 September 1998 (aged 17)			(Ecuadorian Football Federation) Norte América
12	GK	Gian Terreros	14 May 1998 (aged 17)			(Ecuadorian Football Federation) Barcelona
13	MF	**Byron Castillo**	10 November 1998 (aged 16)			(Ecuadorian Football Federation) Norte América
14	MF	Renny Jaramillo	12 June 1998 (aged 17)			(Ecuadorian Football Federation) Independiente del Valle
15	MF	**Alan Franco**	21 August 1998 (aged 17)			(Ecuadorian Football Federation) Independiente del Valle
16	DF	José Flor	5 April 1998 (aged 17)			(Ecuadorian Football Federation) El Nacional
17	DF	**Pervis Estupiñán**	21 January 1998 (aged 17)			(Ecuadorian Football Federation) LDU Quito
18	MF	Peter Valencia	27 January 1998 (aged 17)			(Ecuadorian Football Federation) River Plate
19	FW	Anderson Naula	22 June 1998 (aged 17)			(Ecuadorian Football Federation) LDU Loja
20	DF	Jean Peña	5 March 1998 (aged 17)			(Ecuadorian Football Federation) El Nacional
21	GK	Leodán Chala	25 January 1998 (aged 17)			(Ecuadorian Football Federation) El Nacional

=== Honduras ===
Head coach: José Valladares

No.	Pos.	Player	Date of birth (age)	Caps	Goals	Club
1	GK	Michael Perelló	11 July 1998 (aged 17)			(National Autonomous Federation of Football of Honduras) Platense
2	DF	Víctor Matamoros	8 October 1999 (aged 16)			(National Autonomous Federation of Football of Honduras) Olimpia
3	DF	**Wesly Decas**	11 August 1999 (aged 16)			(National Autonomous Federation of Football of Honduras) Pumas
4	DF	**Denil Maldonado**	26 March 1998 (aged 17)			(National Autonomous Federation of Football of Honduras) Motagua
5	DF	Dylan Andrade	8 March 1998 (aged 17)			(National Autonomous Federation of Football of Honduras) Platense
6	MF	Jorge Álvarez	28 January 1998 (aged 17)			(National Autonomous Federation of Football of Honduras) Olimpia
7	FW	Foslyn Grant	4 October 1998 (aged 17)			(National Autonomous Federation of Football of Honduras) Motagua
8	MF	Erick Arias	30 January 1998 (aged 17)			(National Autonomous Federation of Football of Honduras) Comayagua
9	FW	**Darixon Vuelto**	15 January 1998 (aged 17)			(National Autonomous Federation of Football of Honduras) Victoria
10	MF	Jafeth Leiva	12 March 1999 (aged 16)			(National Autonomous Federation of Football of Honduras) Olimpia
11	MF	Jancarlo Vargas	16 May 1998 (aged 17)			(National Autonomous Federation of Football of Honduras) Platense
12	GK	Javier Delgado	6 November 1998 (aged 16)			(National Autonomous Federation of Football of Honduras) Honduras Progreso
13	FW	Óscar Castro	16 February 1998 (aged 17)			(National Autonomous Federation of Football of Honduras) Real España
14	DF	Allan Rivera	23 March 1998 (aged 17)			(National Autonomous Federation of Football of Honduras) Real España
15	MF	Kevin Castro	9 October 1998 (aged 17)			(National Autonomous Federation of Football of Honduras) Motagua
16	DF	Gabriel Ortiz	9 February 1998 (aged 17)			(National Autonomous Federation of Football of Honduras) Olimpia
17	MF	José Galeano	22 February 1998 (aged 17)			(National Autonomous Federation of Football of Honduras) Parrillas One
18	FW	David Sánchez	19 March 1998 (aged 17)			(National Autonomous Federation of Football of Honduras) Olimpia
19	MF	**Wisdom Quaye**	8 April 1998 (aged 17)			(National Autonomous Federation of Football of Honduras) Vida
20	DF	Darwin Diego	14 July 1999 (aged 16)			(National Autonomous Federation of Football of Honduras) Vida
21	GK	Henry Mashburn	8 February 1999 (aged 16)			(United States Soccer Federation) Weston

=== Mali ===
Head coach: (Mali) Baye Ba

No.	Pos.	Player	Date of birth (age)	Caps	Goals	Club
1	GK	Samuel Diarra	11 August 1998 (aged 17)			(Malian Football Federation) ASKO
2	DF	**Abdoul Karim Danté**	29 October 1998 (aged 16)			(Malian Football Federation) Jeanne d'Arc FC
3	DF	**Siaka Bagayoko**	4 July 1998 (aged 17)			(Malian Football Federation) Djoliba AC
4	MF	Dramane Simpara	5 May 1998 (aged 17)			(Malian Football Federation) CS Duguwolofila
5	MF	Mamadou Sangaré	19 February 1998 (aged 17)			(Malian Football Federation) Cercle Olympique de Bamako
6	DF	Ismaël Traoré	2 January 1998 (aged 17)			(Malian Football Federation) Centre Salif Keita
7	FW	Sidiki Maïga	28 December 1998 (aged 16)			(Malian Football Federation) AS Real Bamako
8	MF	Moussa Diakité	17 December 1998 (aged 16)			(Malian Football Federation) ASKO
9	FW	Aly Mallé	3 April 1998 (aged 17)			(Malian Football Federation) Black Star FC
10	FW	Mohamed Haidara	31 December 1998 (aged 16)			(Malian Football Federation) Djoliba AC
11	FW	Boubacar Traoré	24 May 1998 (aged 17)			(Malian Football Federation) Jeanne d'Arc FC
12	MF	Sory Ibrahim Keïta	5 February 1998 (aged 17)			(Malian Football Federation) Danaya AC
13	MF	Bourama Diallo	8 February 1999 (aged 16)			(Malian Football Federation) ASKO
14	FW	Mamady Diarra	26 June 2000 (aged 15)			(Malian Football Federation) Yeelen FC
15	DF	**Mamadou Fofana**	21 January 1998 (aged 17)			(Malian Football Federation) Stade Malien
16	GK	Alou Traoré	23 January 1998 (aged 17)			(Malian Football Federation) Djoliba AC
17	FW	**Ousmane Diakité**	25 June 2000 (aged 15)			(Malian Football Federation) Yeelen FC
18	MF	**Amadou Haidara**	31 January 1998 (aged 17)			(Malian Football Federation) Guidars FC
19	MF	Zoumana Simpara	22 February 1998 (aged 17)			(Malian Football Federation) ASKO
20	FW	**Sékou Koïta**	28 November 1999 (aged 15)			(Malian Football Federation) USC Kita
21	GK	Drissa Kouyaté	17 December 1998 (aged 16)			(Malian Football Federation) Black Star FC

== Group E ==
=== Costa Rica ===
Head coach: (Argentina) Marcelo Herrera

No.	Pos.	Player	Date of birth (age)	Caps	Goals	Club
1	GK	Alejandro Barrientos	11 February 1998 (aged 17)			(Costa Rican Football Federation) Saprissa
2	DF	Diego Mesén	28 March 1999 (aged 16)			(Costa Rican Football Federation) Alajuelense
3	DF	**Pablo Arboine**	3 April 1998 (aged 17)			(Costa Rican Football Federation) Santos de Guápiles
4	DF	**Ian Smith**	6 March 1998 (aged 17)			(Costa Rican Football Federation) Santos de Guápiles
5	DF	Esteban González	30 January 1998 (aged 17)			(Costa Rican Football Federation) Saprissa
6	DF	Luis Hernández	7 February 1998 (aged 17)			(Costa Rican Football Federation) Saprissa
7	FW	Javier Camareno	5 January 1998 (aged 17)			(Costa Rican Football Federation) Municipal Liberia
8	MF	Aarón Murillo	2 March 1998 (aged 17)			(Costa Rican Football Federation) Alajuelense
9	FW	Andy Reyes	6 April 1999 (aged 16)			(Costa Rican Football Federation) Carmelita
10	MF	Jonathan Martínez	19 March 1998 (aged 17)			(Costa Rican Football Federation) Carmelita
11	MF	**Barlon Sequeira**	25 May 1998 (aged 17)			(Costa Rican Football Federation) Alajuelense
12	FW	Sergio Ramírez	13 March 1998 (aged 17)			(Costa Rican Football Federation) Academia Monteverde
13	GK	Miguel Ajú	8 November 1999 (aged 15)			(Costa Rican Football Federation) Alajuelense
14	MF	Roberto Córdoba	16 July 1998 (aged 17)			(Costa Rican Football Federation) San Carlos
15	FW	Kevin Masís	5 January 1998 (aged 17)			(Costa Rican Football Federation) Santos de Guápiles
16	DF	Daniel Villegas	6 January 1998 (aged 17)			(Costa Rican Football Federation) Alajuelense
17	MF	Brandon Salazar	13 March 1998 (aged 17)			(Costa Rican Football Federation) Carmelita
18	GK	**Patrick Sequeira**	1 March 1999 (aged 16)			(Costa Rican Football Federation) Limón
19	DF	**Yostin Salinas**	14 September 1998 (aged 17)			(Costa Rican Football Federation) Limón
20	MF	Eduardo Juárez	22 September 1998 (aged 17)			(Costa Rican Football Federation) Alajuelense
21	FW	Alonso Solano	12 February 1998 (aged 17)			(Costa Rican Football Federation) Herediano

=== North Korea ===
Head coach: (North Korea) Yon Kwang-mu

No.	Pos.	Player	Date of birth (age)	Caps	Goals	Club
1	GK	Ri Chol-song	13 March 1998 (aged 17)			(DPR Korea Football Association) Sobaeksu
2	DF	Ri Kuk-hyon	30 October 1998 (aged 16)			(DPR Korea Football Association) Chobyong
3	DF	Kim Wi-song	17 January 1998 (aged 17)			(DPR Korea Football Association) Chobyong
4	DF	Kim Ho-gyong	16 September 1999 (aged 16)			(DPR Korea Football Association) Sobaeksu
5	MF	Kang Song-jin	5 October 1999 (aged 16)			(DPR Korea Football Association) Amrokgang
6	MF	Kim Ye-bom	18 February 1998 (aged 17)			(DPR Korea Football Association) Chobyong
7	MF	Pak Yong-gwan	26 December 1998 (aged 16)			(DPR Korea Football Association) Chobyong
8	MF	Yon Jun-hyok	15 January 1998 (aged 17)			(DPR Korea Football Association) Sobaeksu
9	FW	**Han Kwang-song**	11 September 1998 (aged 17)			(DPR Korea Football Association) Chobyong
10	MF	**Choe Song-hyok**	8 February 1998 (aged 17)			(DPR Korea Football Association) Chobyong
11	FW	Jong Chang-bom	10 August 1998 (aged 17)			(DPR Korea Football Association) Sobaeksu
12	MF	Kim Ji-song	19 February 1999 (aged 16)			(DPR Korea Football Association) Chobyong
13	FW	Jong Se-myong	11 March 1999 (aged 16)			(DPR Korea Football Association) Sonbong
14	DF	Choe Jin-nam	20 November 1998 (aged 16)			(DPR Korea Football Association) Chobyong
15	DF	Kim Yong-saeng	22 September 1998 (aged 17)			(DPR Korea Football Association) 25 April
16	MF	O Chung-guk	6 March 1998 (aged 17)			(DPR Korea Football Association) Chobyong
17	DF	Jang Song-il	21 March 1998 (aged 17)			(DPR Korea Football Association) Sobaeksu
18	GK	Ryu Hyok	18 January 1999 (aged 16)			(DPR Korea Football Association) Wolmido
19	MF	Jo Wi-song	19 December 1998 (aged 16)			(DPR Korea Football Association) Sobaeksu
20	FW	Ryang Hyon-ju	31 May 1998 (aged 17)			(Japan Football Association) Tokyo Korea HS
21	GK	Jong Ju-song	2 January 1998 (aged 17)			(DPR Korea Football Association) Chobyong

=== Russia ===
Head coach: (Russia) Mikhail Galaktionov

No.	Pos.	Player	Date of birth (age)	Caps	Goals	Club
1	GK	**Denis Adamov**	20 February 1998 (aged 17)			(Russian Football Union) Krasnodar
2	DF	Andrei Kudryavtsev	6 November 1998 (aged 16)			(Russian Football Union) Zenit Saint Petersburg
3	DF	Konstantin Kotov	25 June 1998 (aged 17)			(Russian Football Union) Zenit Saint Petersburg
4	DF	**Danil Krugovoy**	28 May 1998 (aged 17)			(Russian Football Union) Zenit Saint Petersburg
5	MF	Aleksei Tatayev	8 October 1998 (aged 17)			(Russian Football Union) Krasnodar
6	MF	Ivan Galanin	5 June 1998 (aged 17)			(Russian Football Union) Lokomotiv Moscow
7	MF	Dmitry Pletnyov	16 January 1998 (aged 17)			(Russian Football Union) Zenit Saint Petersburg
8	MF	Georgi Makhatadze	26 March 1998 (aged 17)			(Russian Football Union) Lokomotiv Moscow
9	FW	**Fyodor Chalov**	10 April 1998 (aged 17)			(Russian Football Union) CSKA Moscow
10	MF	Boris Tsygankov	17 April 1998 (aged 17)			(Russian Football Union) Spartak Moscow
11	FW	Aleksandr Lomovitsky	27 January 1998 (aged 17)			(Russian Football Union) Spartak Moscow
12	GK	**Aleksandr Maksimenko**	19 March 1998 (aged 17)			(Russian Football Union) Spartak Moscow
13	FW	Yegor Denisov	6 February 1998 (aged 17)			(Russian Football Union) Zenit Saint Petersburg
14	DF	Nikolai Prudnikov	1 January 1998 (aged 17)			(Russian Football Union) Chertanovo Moscow
15	DF	Semyon Matviychuk	1 May 1998 (aged 17)			(Russian Football Union) Dynamo Moscow
16	MF	Anatoli Anisimov	23 May 1998 (aged 17)			(Russian Football Union) Rubin Kazan
17	DF	Pavel Lelyukhin	23 April 1998 (aged 17)			(Russian Football Union) Spartak Moscow
18	DF	Amir Gavrilov	13 June 1998 (aged 17)			(Russian Football Union) Rubin Kazan
19	MF	**Konstantin Kuchayev**	18 March 1998 (aged 17)			(Russian Football Union) CSKA Moscow
20	FW	Andrey Zakharov	15 August 1998 (aged 17)			(Russian Football Union) Chertanovo Moscow
21	GK	Ivan Zirikov	6 February 1998 (aged 17)			(Russian Football Union) Dynamo Moscow

=== South Africa ===
Head coach: (South Africa) Molefi Ntseki

No.	Pos.	Player	Date of birth (age)	Caps	Goals	Club
1	GK	Sanele Tshabalala	12 May 1998 (aged 17)			(South African Football Association) Bidvest Wits
2	MF	Simon Nqoi	28 June 1998 (aged 17)			(South African Football Association) SuperSport United
3	DF	Riyaaz Ismail	5 January 1998 (aged 17)			(South African Football Association) Hellenic
4	DF	Kateglo Mohamme	10 March 1998 (aged 17)			(South African Football Association) SuperSport United
5	MF	**Athenkosi Dlala**	6 February 1998 (aged 17)			(South African Football Association) SuperSport United
6	DF	Notha Ngcobo	10 January 1999 (aged 16)			(South African Football Association) Mamelodi Sundowns
7	MF	Vuyo Mantjie	22 June 1998 (aged 17)			(South African Football Association) Harmony Academy
8	MF	Sibongakonke Mbatha	1 January 1998 (aged 17)			(South African Football Association) School of Exellence
9	FW	Luvuyo Mkatshana	20 April 1998 (aged 17)			(South African Football Association) Bidvest Wits
10	MF	Nelson Maluleke	1 April 1998 (aged 17)			(South African Football Association) SuperSport United
11	MF	**Sphephelo Sithole**	3 March 1999 (aged 16)			(South African Football Association) Kwazulu Natal Academy
12	MF	**Wiseman Meyiwa**	27 December 1999 (aged 15)			(South African Football Association) Kaizer Chiefs
13	DF	**Thendo Mukumela**	30 January 1998 (aged 17)			(South African Football Association) Mamelodi Sundowns
14	MF	Tebogo Qinisile	13 May 1998 (aged 17)			(South African Football Association) Bloemfontein Celtic
15	DF	**Keanu Cupido**	15 January 1998 (aged 17)			(South African Football Association) Diambars Academy
16	GK	**Mondli Mpoto**	24 July 1998 (aged 17)			(South African Football Association) SuperSport United
17	FW	**Khanyisa Mayo**	27 August 1998 (aged 17)			(South African Football Association) SuperSport United
18	FW	Dylan Stoffels	18 January 1999 (aged 16)			(South African Football Association) AmaZulu
19	FW	**Kobamelo Kodisang**	28 August 1999 (aged 16)			(South African Football Association) Platinum Stars
20	MF	**Reeve Frosler**	11 January 1998 (aged 17)			(South African Football Association) Bidvest Wits
21	GK	Walter Kubheka	7 January 1999 (aged 16)			(South African Football Association) Mamelodi Sundowns

== Group F ==
=== France ===
Head coach: (France) Jean-Claude Giuntini

No.	Pos.	Player	Date of birth (age)	Caps	Goals	Club
1	GK	**Luca Zidane** (Note: Capped for Algeria)	13 May 1998 (aged 17)			(Royal Spanish Football Federation) Real Madrid
2	DF	Peter Ouaneh	4 April 1998 (aged 17)			(French Football Federation) Lorient
3	DF	Mamadou Doucouré	21 May 1998 (aged 17)			(French Football Federation) Paris Saint-Germain
4	DF	Hugo Mesbah	1 February 1998 (aged 17)			(French Football Federation) Tours
5	DF	**Dayot Upamecano**	27 October 1998 (aged 16)			(Austrian Football Association) Red Bull Salzburg
6	MF	Jean Ruiz	6 April 1998 (aged 17)			(French Football Federation) Sochaux
7	MF	Alexis Claude-Maurice	6 June 1998 (aged 17)			(French Football Federation) Lorient
8	FW	Odsonne Édouard	16 January 1998 (aged 17)			(French Football Federation) Paris Saint-Germain
9	MF	Jeff Reine-Adélaïde	17 January 1998 (aged 17)			(The Football Association) Arsenal
10	MF	Timothé Cognat	25 January 1998 (aged 17)			(French Football Federation) Lyon
11	MF	Nicolas Janvier	11 August 1998 (aged 17)			(French Football Federation) Rennes
12	FW	Bilal Boutobba	29 August 1998 (aged 17)			(French Football Federation) Marseille
13	MF	Lamine Fomba	26 January 1998 (aged 17)			(French Football Federation) Auxerre
14	DF	Faitout Maouassa	6 July 1998 (aged 17)			(French Football Federation) Nancy
15	FW	Maxime Pélican	12 May 1998 (aged 17)			(French Football Federation) Toulouse
16	GK	Numan Bostan	31 January 1998 (aged 17)			(French Football Federation) Toulouse
17	DF	**Issa Samba** (Note: Capped for Mauritania)	29 January 1998 (aged 17)			(French Football Federation) Auxerre
18	FW	**Jonathan Ikoné**	2 May 1998 (aged 17)			(French Football Federation) Paris Saint-Germain
19	MF	Lorenzo Callegari	27 February 1998 (aged 17)			(French Football Federation) Paris Saint-Germain
20	DF	Alec Georgen	17 September 1998 (aged 17)			(French Football Federation) Paris Saint-Germain
21	GK	Loïc Badiashile	5 February 1998 (aged 17)			(French Football Federation) Monaco

=== New Zealand ===
Head coach: (New Zealand) Danny Hay

No.	Pos.	Player	Date of birth (age)	Caps	Goals	Club
1	GK	**Michael Woud**	16 January 1999 (aged 16)			(New Zealand Football) Bay Olympic
2	DF	Jack-Henry Sinclair	23 February 1998 (aged 17)			(New Zealand Football) North Shore United
3	DF	Liam Jones	18 January 1999 (aged 16)			(New Zealand Football) Western Suburbs
4	MF	Oliver Ceci	22 February 1998 (aged 17)			(New Zealand Football) North Shore United
5	DF	Liam Williams	17 July 1998 (aged 17)			(New Zealand Football) Western Springs
6	DF	**Benjamin Mata** (Note: Capped for Cook Islands)	10 August 1998 (aged 17)			(New Zealand Football) Onehunga Sports
7	MF	**Sarpreet Singh**	20 February 1999 (aged 16)			(New Zealand Football) Wellington United
8	MF	Dane Schnell	14 May 1999 (aged 16)			(New Zealand Football) Western Springs
9	FW	Connor Probert	6 April 1998 (aged 17)			(New Zealand Football) Western Springs
10	FW	**Logan Rogerson**	28 May 1998 (aged 17)			(New Zealand Football) Wellington United
11	FW	**James McGarry**	9 April 1998 (aged 17)			(New Zealand Football) Wellington United
12	GK	Reuben Clark	4 August 1998 (aged 17)			(New Zealand Football) Onehunga Sports
13	MF	**Joe Bell**	27 April 1999 (aged 16)			(New Zealand Football) Miramar Rangers
14	MF	**Owen Parker-Price**	10 December 1998 (aged 16)			(New Zealand Football) Western Suburbs
15	DF	Luke Johnson	15 April 1998 (aged 17)			(New Zealand Football) North Shore United
16	DF	Hunter Ashworth	8 January 1998 (aged 17)			(United States Soccer Federation) University of San Francisco
17	MF	**Callum McCowatt**	30 April 1999 (aged 16)			(New Zealand Football) Western Suburbs
18	FW	Wali Mohammadi	21 January 1999 (aged 16)			(New Zealand Football) Western Suburbs
19	FW	Sean Skeens	12 September 1998 (aged 17)			(New Zealand Football) Birkenhead United
20	FW	Lucas Imrie	20 May 1998 (aged 17)			(New Zealand Football) Central United
21	GK	Christian Woodbridge	19 March 1998 (aged 17)			(New Zealand Football) Onehunga Sports

=== Paraguay ===
Head coach: (Paraguay) Carlos Jara Saguier

No.	Pos.	Player	Date of birth (age)	Caps	Goals	Club
1	GK	Gabriel Perrotta	26 December 1998 (aged 16)			(Paraguayan Football Association) Nacional
2	DF	Rodi Ferreira	29 May 1998 (aged 17)			(Paraguayan Football Association) Olimpia
3	DF	Luis Giménez	1 August 1998 (aged 17)			(Paraguayan Football Association) Olimpia
4	DF	**Blás Riveros**	3 February 1998 (aged 17)			(Paraguayan Football Association) Olimpia
5	DF	Marcelo Arce	24 March 1998 (aged 17)			(Paraguayan Football Association) Olimpia
6	MF	Arturo Aranda	20 November 1998 (aged 16)			(Paraguayan Football Association) Olimpia
7	MF	**Jorge Morel**	22 January 1998 (aged 17)			(Paraguayan Football Association) Libertad
8	MF	**Cristhian Paredes**	18 May 1998 (aged 17)			(Paraguayan Football Association) Guarani
9	FW	**Sebastián Ferreira**	13 February 1998 (aged 17)			(Paraguayan Football Association) Sol de América
10	FW	**Sergio Díaz**	5 March 1998 (aged 17)			(Paraguayan Football Association) Cerro Porteño
11	MF	**Josué Colmán**	25 July 1998 (aged 17)			(Paraguayan Football Association) Cerro Porteño
12	GK	Miguel Martínez	29 September 1998 (aged 17)			(Paraguayan Football Association) General Díaz
13	DF	Fernando Lomaquis	5 September 1998 (aged 17)			(Paraguayan Football Association) Rubio Ñu
14	DF	Óscar Rodas	8 February 1998 (aged 17)			(Paraguayan Football Association) Olimpia
15	DF	Juan Ojeda	4 April 1998 (aged 17)			(Paraguayan Football Association) Sportivo Luqueño
16	MF	Nery Balbuena	18 June 1998 (aged 17)			(Paraguayan Football Association) Nacional
17	MF	Marcelino Ñamandú	28 July 1999 (aged 16)			(Paraguayan Football Association) Rubio Ñu
18	MF	Ricardo Gabazza	21 January 1999 (aged 16)			(Paraguayan Football Association) Libertad
19	FW	René Cabrera	16 April 1998 (aged 17)			(Paraguayan Football Association) Nacional
20	FW	Julio Villalba	17 September 1998 (aged 17)			(Paraguayan Football Association) Cerro Porteño
21	GK	Óscar Benítez	10 July 1998 (aged 17)			(Paraguayan Football Association) Rubio Ñu

=== Syria ===
Head coach: (Syria) Mohammad Al-Attar

No.	Pos.	Player	Date of birth (age)	Caps	Goals	Club
1	GK	William Ghannam	1 January 1998 (aged 17)			(Syrian Football Association) Al-Majd
2	DF	Taha Al-Aek	2 January 1998 (aged 17)			(Syrian Football Association) Al-Karamah
3	DF	Omar Lahlah	4 January 1998 (aged 17)			(Syrian Football Association) Taliya
4	DF	Hassan Al-Damen	20 January 1998 (aged 17)			(Syrian Football Association) Al-Ittihad
5	MF	Hassan Al-Nadaf	10 January 1998 (aged 17)			(Syrian Football Association) Al-Kiswah
6	MF	Mohammad Loulou	1 January 1998 (aged 17)			(Syrian Football Association) Baniyas Refinery
7	MF	Basel Kawabi	3 January 1998 (aged 17)			(Syrian Football Association) Al-Ittihad
8	MF	Mohammad Al-Hallak	1 January 1999 (aged 16)			(Syrian Football Association) Al-Kiswah
9	FW	Naem Ghezal Naem	2 May 1998 (aged 17)			(Syrian Football Association) Tishreen
10	MF	Abdulrahman Al-Barakat	1 January 1998 (aged 17)			(Syrian Football Association) Al-Jazeera
11	FW	Anas Al-Aji	7 January 1998 (aged 17)			(Syrian Football Association) Al-Wahda
12	MF	Amin Akil	9 February 1999 (aged 16)			(Syrian Football Association) Hutteen
13	FW	Mohammad Zid Gharir	10 January 1998 (aged 17)			(Syrian Football Association) Al-Karamah
14	DF	Mohammad Khoja	1 January 1998 (aged 17)			(Syrian Football Association) Jableh
15	DF	Mohammad Al-Kadour	4 March 1998 (aged 17)			(Syrian Football Association) Al-Karamah
16	MF	Kamel Koaeh	1 January 1998 (aged 17)			(Syrian Football Association) Al-Shurta
17	DF	Sardar Sulaiman	1 January 1998 (aged 17)			(Syrian Football Association) Al-Jihad
18	FW	Abdulhadi Shalha	19 January 1999 (aged 16)			(Syrian Football Association) Al-Wahda
19	MF	Ahmad Al-Khassi	27 April 1999 (aged 16)			(Syrian Football Association) Al-Jaish
20	GK	Omar Kadije	1 January 1998 (aged 17)			(Syrian Football Association) Hutteen
21	GK	Ghaith Sulaiman	3 January 1998 (aged 17)			(Syrian Football Association) Tishreen
