= Juan Ojeda =

Juan Ojeda may refer to:

- Juan Ojeda (Argentine footballer) (born 1982)
- Juan Ojeda (Paraguayan footballer) (born 1998)

== See also ==
- Juan Manuel Rodríguez Ojeda, Spanish embroiderer and designer
- Juan Battista de Ojeda, Roman Catholic prelate
- Ojeda (surname)
