= Ojeda (surname) =

Ojeda is a Spanish surname.

== Geographical distribution ==
As of 2014, 22.7% of all known bearers of the surname Ojeda were residents of Argentina (frequency 1:458), 20.7% of Mexico (1:1,461), 10.4% of Venezuela (1:705), 7.7% of Paraguay (1:227), 7.1% of Chile (1:602), 6.9% of Colombia (1:1,693), 5.2% of Peru (1:1,482), 5.1% of Spain (1:2,237), 4.7% of the United States (1:18,710), 2.2% of Ecuador (1:1,738), 2.0% of Cuba (1:1,377), 1.3% of Bolivia (1:1,918) and 1.0% of the Philippines (1:24,752).

In Spain, the frequency of the surname was higher than national average (1:2,237) in the following autonomous communities:

1. Canary Islands (1:315)
2. La Rioja (1:1,032)
3. Andalusia (1:1,316)

In Paraguay, the frequency of the surname was higher than national average (1:227) in the following departments:

1. Cordillera (1:155)
2. Paraguarí (1:177)
3. Caaguazú (1:181)
4. Ñeembucú (1:205)
5. Alto Paraguay (1:207)
6. Central (1:209)
7. Alto Paraná (1:217)
8. Amambay (1:226)
9. Concepción (1:227)

== People ==
- Alonso de Ojeda (c. 1465–1515), Spanish explorer
- Augie Ojeda (born 1974), baseball player
- Bob Ojeda (born 1957), baseball player
- César Raúl Ojeda Zubieta (born 1952), Mexican politician
- Eddie Ojeda (born 1955), guitarist, Twisted Sister
- Enrique García Ojeda (born 1972), Spanish rally driver
- Fabricio Ojeda (1929–1966), Venezuelan guerrilla leader, journalist and politician
- Filiberto Ojeda Ríos (1933–2005), Puerto Rican commander-in-chief of the Boricua Popular Army
- J. Enrique Ojeda (1928–2023), Ecuadorian literary critic
- Juan Ojeda (Argentine footballer) (born 1982), Argentine footballer
- Juan Ojeda (Paraguayan footballer) (born 1998), Paraguayan footballer
- León Fidel Ojeda (born 1967), Colombian politician
- Luis Francisco Ojeda (born 1941), Puerto Rican television host
- Manuel Ojeda (1940–2022), Mexican actor
- Mario Ojeda Gómez (1927–2013), Mexican scholar
- Miguel Ojeda (born 1975), Mexican baseball player
- Richard Ojeda (born 1970), American politician from West Virginia
- Rosa María Ojeda (born 1986), Mexican model
- Santos Ojeda (1917–2004), Cuban-American classical pianist
- Wilfred Iván Ojeda (1955–2011), Venezuelan journalist and politician
