= Louis Victor =

Louis Victor may refer to:

- Louis Victor, Prince of Carignano, aristocrat
- Archduke Ludwig Viktor of Austria, aristocrat
- Louis-Victor Sicotte, lawyer
- Louis-Victor Marcé, psychiatrist
- Louis Victor Robert Schwartzkopff, industrialist
- Louis Victor de Blacquetot de Caux, politician
- Louis Victor Dubois, politician
