= Enrique Ojeda =

Enrique Ojeda may refer to:

- Enrique Ojeda (sport shooter)
- Enrique Ojeda (scholar)
