= Dreux =

- Subprefecture and commune
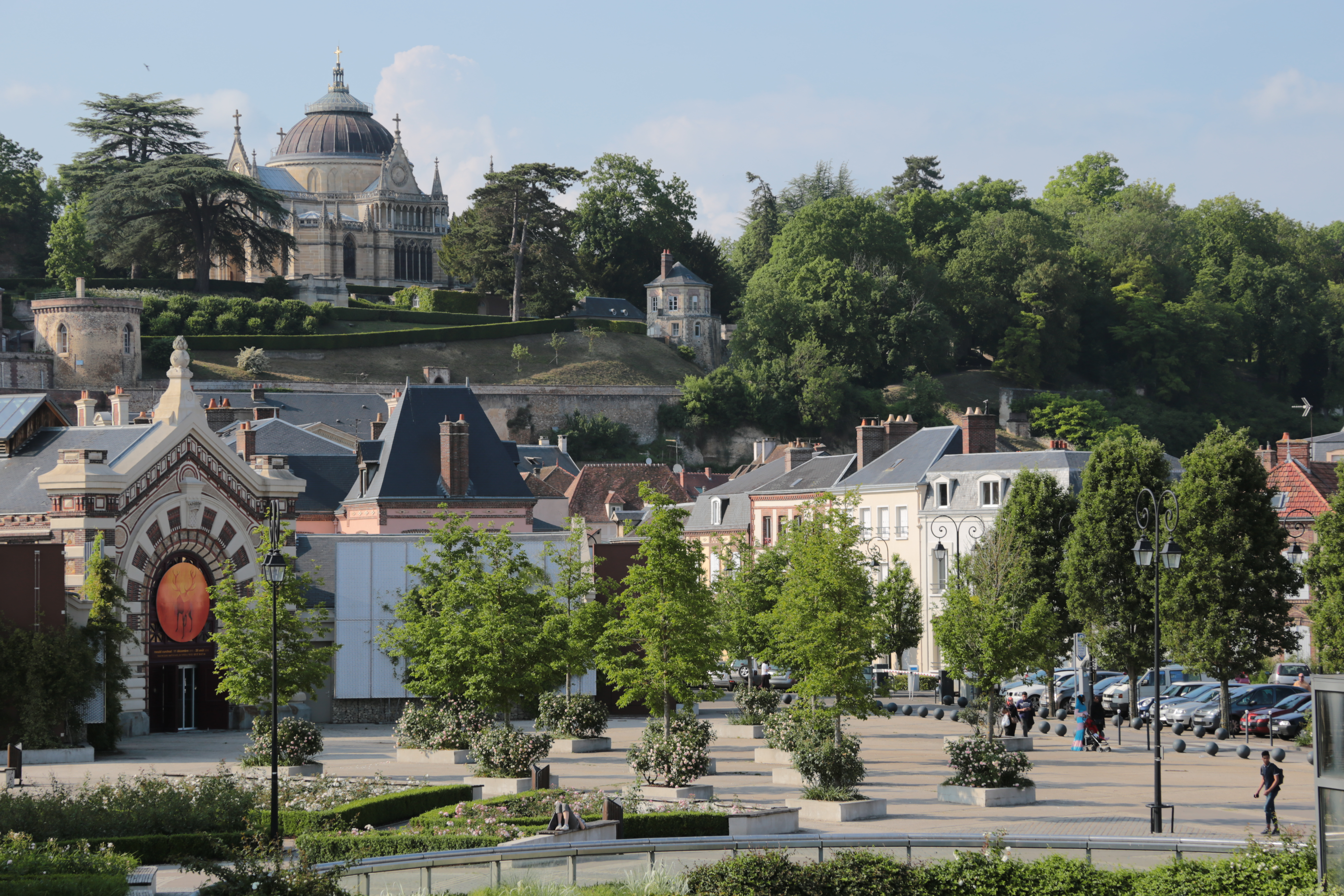
- Place Mésirard with the Chapelle royale de Dreux in the background

- Coat of arms
- Location of Dreux
- Location within France Location within Centre-Val de Loire
- Coordinates: 48°44′14″N 1°21′59″E
- Country: France
- Region: Centre-Val de Loire
- Department: Eure-et-Loir
- Arrondissement: Dreux
- Canton: Dreux-1 and 2
- Intercommunality: CA Pays de Dreux

Government
  - Mayor (2020–2026): Pierre-Frédéric Billet
- Area^{1}: 24.27 km^{2} (9.37 sq mi)
- Highest elevation: 139 m (456 ft)
- Lowest elevation: 75 m (246 ft)
- Population (2023): 31,543
  - Density: 1,300/km^{2} (3,366/sq mi)
- Demonym: Drouais
- Time zone: UTC+01:00 (CET)
  - Summer (DST): UTC+02:00 (CEST)
- INSEE/Postal code: 28134 /28100
- Website: dreux.com
- ^{1} French Land Register data, which excludes lakes, ponds, glaciers > 1 km^{2} (0.386 sq mi or 247 acres) and river estuaries.

Dreux (French pronunciation: [dʁø]) is a subprefecture in the Eure-et-Loir department in Centre-Val de Loire in northern France. It is in the north of Eure-et-Loir, on the departmental border with Eure, which is also the regional border with Normandy. In 2023, it had a population of 31,543.

Dreux is best known for its Chapelle royale (Royal Chapel), the necropolis of the House of Orléans. Dreux station is a terminus of Transilien Line N and offers connections to Versailles and Paris.

== Geography ==
Dreux lies on the small river Blaise, a tributary of the Eure, about 35 km north of Chartres. Dreux station has rail connections to Argentan, Paris and Granville. The Route nationale 12 (Paris–Rennes) passes north of the town.

== History ==
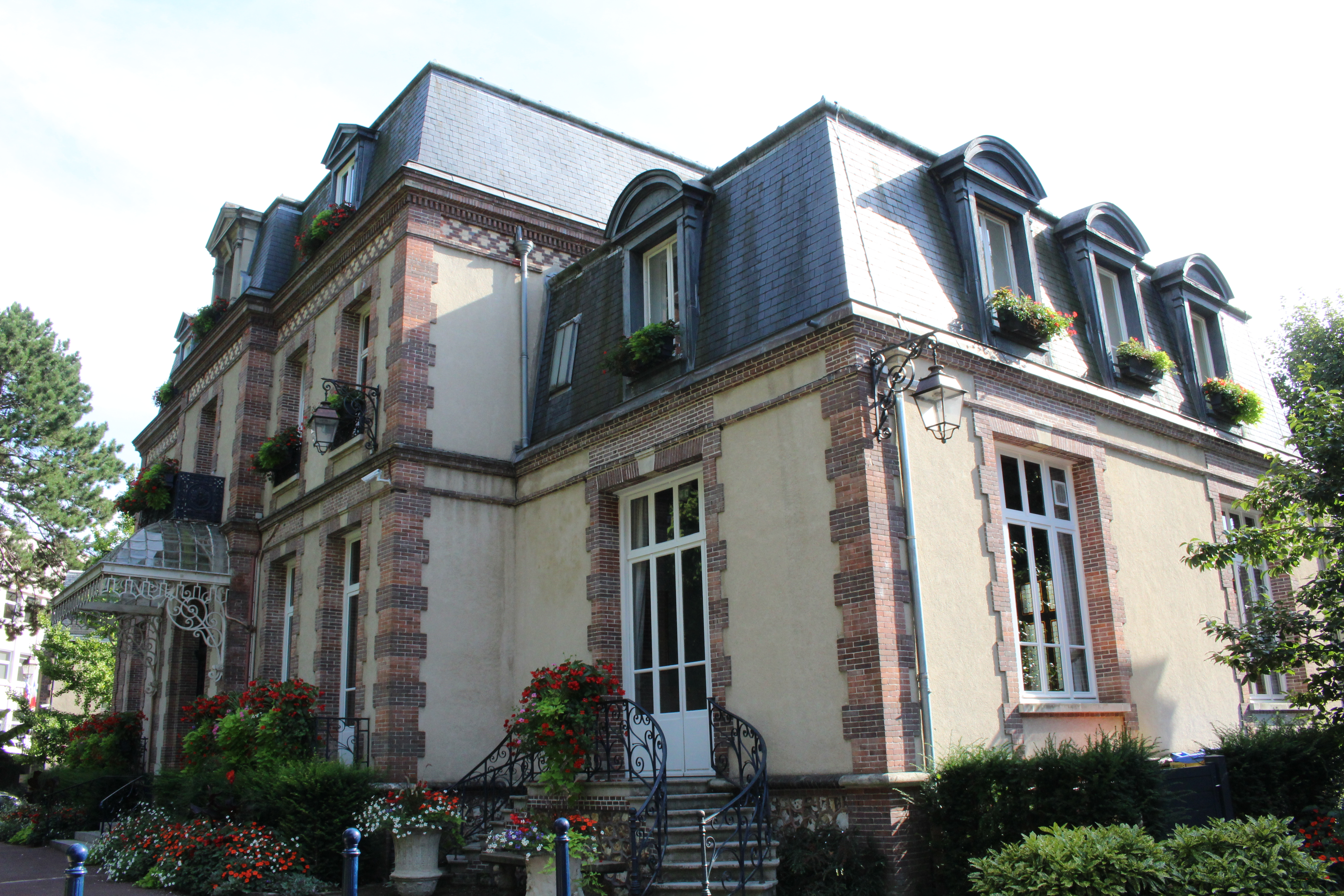
The Hôtel de Ville

Dreux was known in ancient times as Durocassium, the capital of the Durocasses Celtic tribe. Despite the legend, its name was not related with Druids. The Romans established here a fortified camp known as Castrum Drocas.

In the Middle Ages, Dreux was the centre of the County of Dreux. The first count of Dreux was Robert, the son of King Louis the Fat. The first large battle of the French Wars of Religion occurred at Dreux, on 19 December 1562, resulting in a hard-fought victory for the Catholic forces of the duc de Montmorency.

The Hôtel de Ville is a former private residence completed in 1886.

In October 1983, the Front National won 55% of the vote in the second round of elections for the city council of Dreux, in one of its first significant electoral victories.

== Population ==
Historical population

Year	Pop.	±% p.a.
1793	5,383	—
1800	5,437	+0.14%
1806	6,037	+1.76%
1821	6,032	−0.01%
1831	6,249	+0.35%
1836	6,379	+0.41%
1841	6,367	−0.04%
1846	6,774	+1.25%
1851	6,764	−0.03%
1856	6,498	−0.80%
1861	6,940	+1.32%
1866	7,237	+0.84%
1872	7,418	+0.41%
1876	7,922	+1.66%
1881	8,254	+0.82%
1886	8,719	+1.10%
1891	9,364	+1.44%
1896	9,718	+0.74%
1901	9,697	−0.04%

Year	Pop.	±% p.a.
1906	9,928	+0.47%
1911	10,692	+1.49%
1921	10,908	+0.20%
1926	11,313	+0.73%
1931	12,200	+1.52%
1936	13,361	+1.83%
1946	14,184	+0.60%
1954	16,818	+2.15%
1962	21,588	+3.17%
1968	29,408	+5.29%
1975	33,101	+1.70%
1982	33,379	+0.12%
1990	35,230	+0.68%
1999	31,849	−1.11%
2007	32,155	+0.12%
2012	31,195	−0.60%
2017	31,044	−0.10%
2023	31,543	+0.27%

Source: EHESS and INSEE (1968–2023)

Dreux has a significant Muslim population, estimated to be around 35%. Dreux's Muslim population consists mainly of North Africans, Arabs, Turks, and Sub-Saharan Africans. Many Muslims in Dreux experience high levels of poverty and unemployment. One-in-four residents in the town are immigrants.

== Sights ==
=== Chapelle royale de Dreux ===
In 1775, the lands of the comté de Dreux had been given to the Louis Jean Marie de Bourbon, duc de Penthièvre by his cousin Louis XVI. In 1783, the duke sold his domain of Rambouillet to Louis XVI. On 25 November of that year, in a long religious procession, Penthièvre transferred the nine caskets containing the remains of his parents, the Louis-Alexandre de Bourbon, comte de Toulouse and Marie Victoire de Noailles, comtesse de Toulouse, his wife, Marie Thérèse Félicité d'Este, Princess of Modène, and six of their seven children, from the small medieval village church next to the castle in Rambouillet, to the chapel of the Collégiale Saint-Étienne de Dreux. The duc de Penthièvre died in March 1793 and his body was laid to rest in the crypt beside his parents. On 21 November of that same year, in the midst of the French Revolution, a mob desecrated the crypt and threw the ten bodies in a mass grave in the Chanoines cemetery of the Collégiale Saint-Étienne. In 1816, the duc de Penthièvre's daughter, Louise Marie Adélaïde de Bourbon, duchesse d'Orléans, had a new chapel built on the site of the mass grave of the Chanoines cemetery, as the final resting place for her family. In 1830, Louis Philippe I, King of the French, son of the duchesse d'Orléans, embellished the chapel which was renamed Chapelle royale de Dreux, now the necropolis of the Orléans royal family.

=== Other sights ===
- Musée d'Art et d'Histoire de Dreux
- Hôtel de Montulé (16th century)
- Pavilion of Louis XVI
- Hôtel de Salvat-Duhalde (18th century)
- Renaissance Château d'Anet

== Personalities ==
Dreux was the birthplace of:

- Kalifa Cissé, footballer
- Martin Pierre d'Alvimare (1772–1839), composer and harpist
- Charles Delescluze (1809–1871), journalist and military commander of the Paris Commune
- Siraba Dembélé, handball player
- Abdou Dieye, footballer
- Louis Victor Dubois (1837–1914), wine merchant and politician
- Léa Le Garrec, footballer for Fleury and the France national team
- Antoine Godeau (1605–1672), bishop, poet and exegete. He is now known for his work of criticism Discours de la poésie chrétienne from 1633.
- Rémi Gounelle (1967–), Protestant theologian
- Marouan Kechrid, basketball player
- Yannick Lesourd, athlete
- Jean-Louis-Auguste Loiseleur-Deslongchamps (1774–1849), botanist
- Eddie London (1956–), singer
- François-André Danican Philidor (1726–1795), musician and chess player
- Jean Rotrou (1609–1650), poet and tragedian
- Issa Samba, footballer
- Adrien Trebel (1991–), footballer
- Guerschon Yabusele, professional basketball player

== Twin towns and sister cities ==
Dreux is twinned with:

- Todi, Italy, since 1960
- Melsungen, Germany, since 1966
- Koudougou, Burkina Faso, since 1972
- Evesham, England, UK, since 1977
- Bautzen, Germany, since 1992
- Almeirim, Portugal, since 2018

== Climate ==
Climate data for Dreux (1996–2010 normals, extremes 1996–2011)
Month	Jan	Feb	Mar	Apr	May	Jun	Jul	Aug	Sep	Oct	Nov	Dec	Year
Record high °C (°F)	15.2 (59.4)	18.5 (65.3)	22.5 (72.5)	26.6 (79.9)	31.2 (88.2)	34.3 (93.7)	36.0 (96.8)	39.4 (102.9)	31.7 (89.1)	24.7 (76.5)	18.8 (65.8)	16.8 (62.2)	39.4 (102.9)
Mean daily maximum °C (°F)	6.6 (43.9)	8.5 (47.3)	11.8 (53.2)	15.3 (59.5)	19.2 (66.6)	22.3 (72.1)	24.9 (76.8)	25.0 (77.0)	21.4 (70.5)	16.1 (61.0)	10.4 (50.7)	6.6 (43.9)	15.8 (60.4)
Daily mean °C (°F)	4.1 (39.4)	5.2 (41.4)	7.7 (45.9)	10.3 (50.5)	14.0 (57.2)	17.1 (62.8)	19.1 (66.4)	19.3 (66.7)	16.1 (61.0)	12.2 (54.0)	7.5 (45.5)	4.2 (39.6)	11.4 (52.5)
Mean daily minimum °C (°F)	1.6 (34.9)	2.0 (35.6)	3.5 (38.3)	5.2 (41.4)	8.8 (47.8)	11.5 (52.7)	13.3 (55.9)	13.5 (56.3)	10.8 (51.4)	8.3 (46.9)	4.6 (40.3)	1.7 (35.1)	7.1 (44.8)
Record low °C (°F)	−14.0 (6.8)	−9.3 (15.3)	−8.3 (17.1)	−3.4 (25.9)	−1.0 (30.2)	2.4 (36.3)	6.8 (44.2)	4.4 (39.9)	2.0 (35.6)	−4.5 (23.9)	−10.0 (14.0)	−10.6 (12.9)	−14.0 (6.8)
Average precipitation mm (inches)	41.6 (1.64)	38.6 (1.52)	40.6 (1.60)	38.4 (1.51)	47.0 (1.85)	46.9 (1.85)	57.8 (2.28)	39.2 (1.54)	39.2 (1.54)	60.0 (2.36)	48.8 (1.92)	59.2 (2.33)	557.3 (21.94)
Average precipitation days (≥ 1.0 mm)	9.1	9.9	9.3	8.8	8.9	7.6	8.3	7.7	7.1	10.3	11.9	11.9	110.7
Source: Meteociel

== See also ==
- Communes of the Eure-et-Loir department
