= Eddie London =

American singer-songwriter

- Born: Kenneth Edward London; July 31, 1956; Dreux, France
- Died: January 4, 2025 (aged 68) Sebring, Florida, U.S.
- Genres: Country
- Occupation: Singer
- Instruments: Vocals, bass guitar
- Years active: 1978–1991
- Labels: J.C. 100; RCA Nashville

Kenneth Edward "Eddie" London (July 31, 1956 – January 4, 2025) is a country music singer. Signed to RCA Nashville in 1991, he released the album Do It Right that year. This album produced the single "If We Can't Do It Right", which peaked at number 41 on the U.S. country singles charts and is his only chart entry. Eddie is currently a tour bus driver for touring musicians.

== Biography ==
Kenneth Edward London was born in Dreux, France to a military family, but lived in Syracuse, New York. He later moved to Nashville, Tennessee, working as a demo singer and session bass guitarist, playing for Kitty Wells and Red Sovine, among others.

In 1991, London signed to RCA Records Nashville to release his debut album Do It Right and its single, "If We Can't Do It Right", which peaked at number 41 on the Billboard Hot Country Songs charts. Ken Rosenbaum of the Toledo Blade described the album as "30 minutes of mediocrity," and an uncredited review in the Miami Herald called it "sweeter than molasses dripping over a bowl of Fruit Loops [sic]. And just as repugnant." The album was produced by Ronnie Rogers (who also wrote several of the songs on it) and Warren Peterson. Its other singles, "Uninvited Memory" and "I Wouldn't Change a Thing About You but Your Name," did not chart.

Eddie died on January 4, 2025, in Sebring, Florida. He is survived by his only child, Kaitlyn London, of Winter Haven Florida.

== Do It Right (1991) ==
Do It Right

Studio album by Eddie London
- Released: 1991
- Genre: Country
- Label: RCA Nashville
- Producer: Ronnie Rogers, Warren Peterson

1. "Wakin' with the Blues" (Ronnie Rogers) – 2:45
2. "If We Can't Do It Right" (Rogers, Mark Wright) – 3:24
3. "I Wouldn't Change a Thing About You but Your Name" (Rick West, Bob Moulds, David Wills) – 2:50
4. "Uninvited Memory" (Will Robinson, Larry Boone, John Greenebaum) – 3:57
5. "Leave My Country Alone" (Rogers, Ron Peterson) – 2:28
6. "Up on a Stool Feelin' Down" (Rogers) – 3:05
7. "Only a Fool Would Know" (Rogers) – 2:43
8. "Rowdy Road" (Rogers) – 4:07
9. "My Love Belongs to You" (Rogers) – 3:36
10. "Business as Usual" (Dennis Adkins) – 4:59

=== Personnel ===
As listed in liner notes.

- Bobby All – acoustic guitar
- Costo Davis – synthesizer
- Glen Duncan – fiddle
- Sonny Garrish – steel guitar
- Steve Gibson – electric guitar, acoustic guitar
- Owen Hale – drums
- David Hungate – bass guitar
- Jana King – background vocals
- Mike Lawler – synthesizer
- Larrie Londin – drums
- Weldon Myrick – steel guitar
- Donna Rhodes – background vocals
- Perry Rhodes – background vocals
- Hargus "Pig" Robbins – piano, synthesizer
- Brent Rowan – electric guitar
- Lisa Silver – background vocals
- D. Bergen White – background vocals
- Bob Wray – bass guitar
- Reggie Young – electric guitar

Strings performed by the Nashville String Machine, arranged by D. Bergen White, contracted by Carl Gorodetzky.

Additional background vocals on "Business as Usual" by "The Happen-To-Bes": Mary McCarthy, Teddy Gentry, Dale Morris, Jack Weston, Roger Sovine, Harry Warner, Ronnie Rogers, Warren Peterson, Greg Fowler.

== Singles ==
Year	Single	Peak positions	Album
Year	Single	US Country	Album
1989	"Suddenly"	—	Non-album single
1991	"If We Can't Do It Right"	41	Do It Right
1991	"Uninvited Memory"	—	Do It Right
1991	"I Wouldn't Change a Thing About You but Your Name"	—	Do It Right
"—" denotes releases that did not chart
