= Hôtel de Ville, Dreux =

Town hall in Dreux, France

Hôtel de Ville
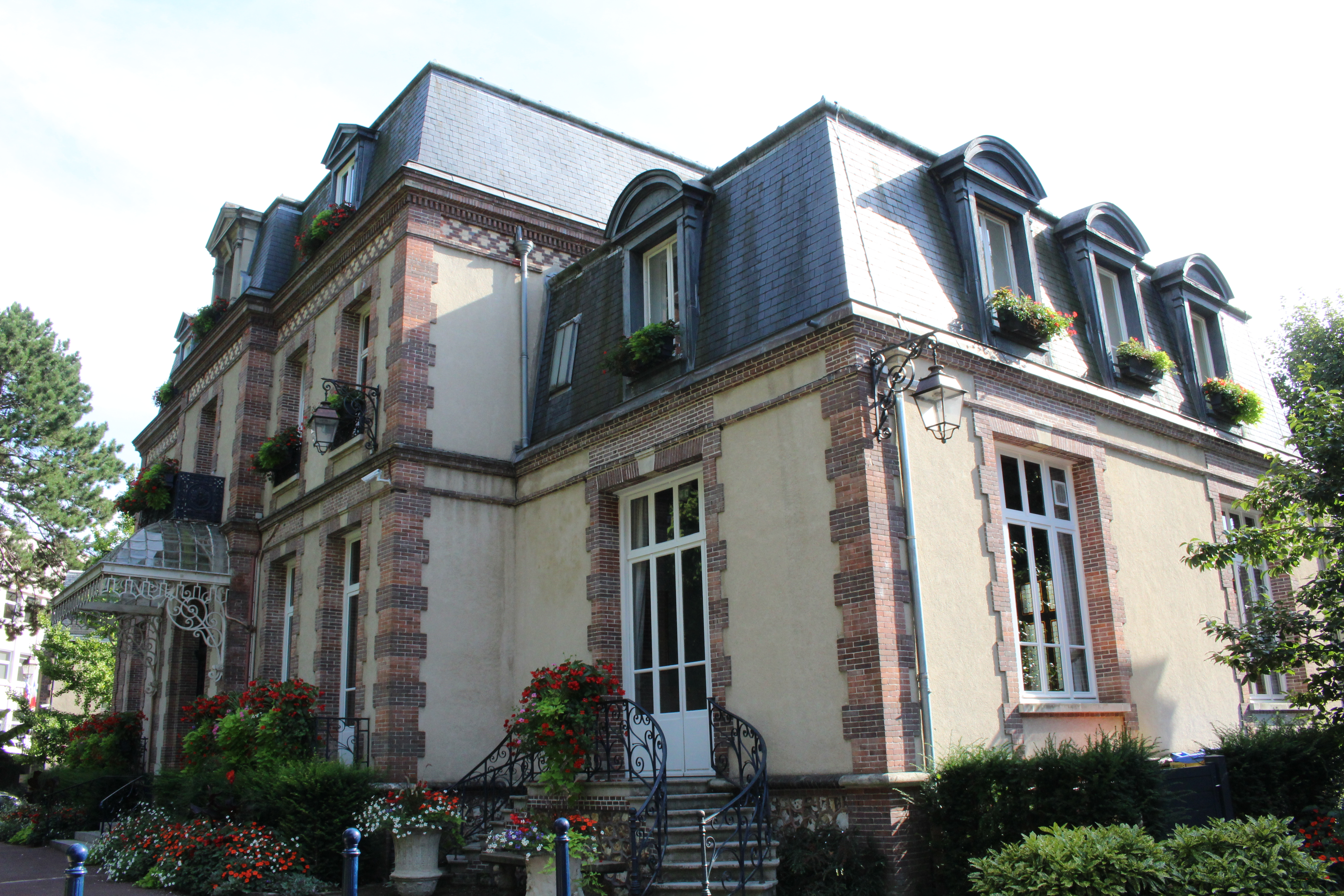
- The main frontage of the Hôtel de Ville in August 2019

General information
- Type: City hall
- Architectural style: Neoclassical style
- Location: Dreux, France
- Coordinates: 48.7360°N 1.3709°E
- Completed: 1886

The Hôtel de Ville (French pronunciation: [otɛl də vil], City Hall) is a municipal building in Dreux, Eure-et-Loir in northern France, standing on Rue de Châteaudun.

== History ==
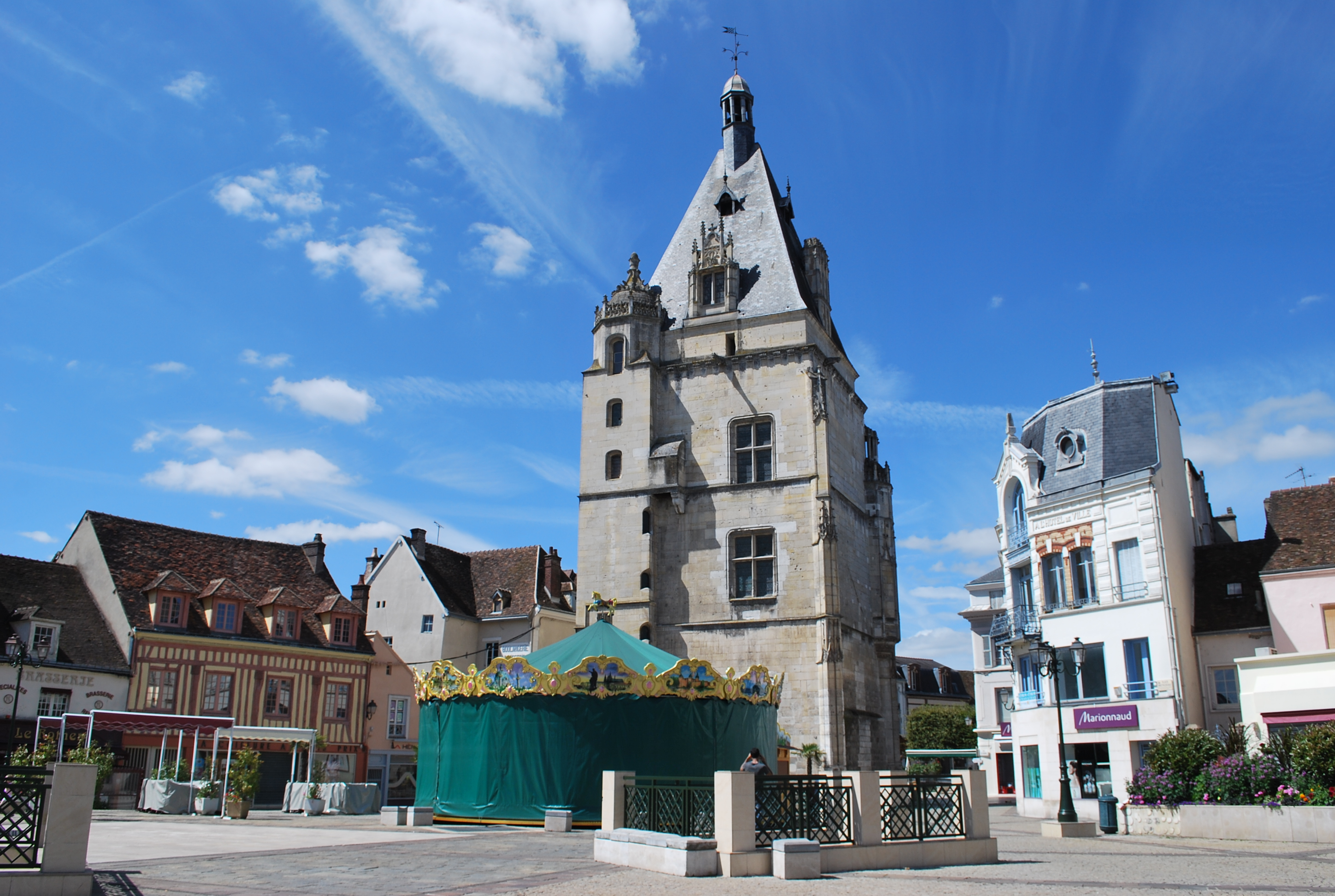
The town hall completed in 1537

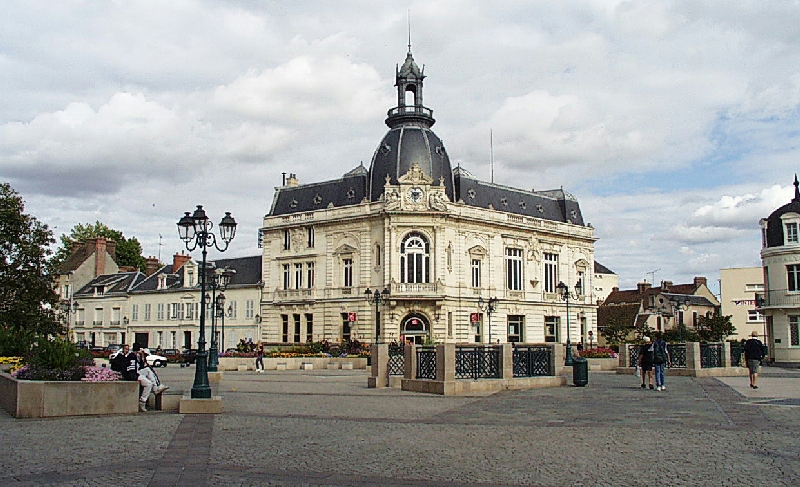
The town hall completed in 1894

Although King Louis VI invited the local people to form a medieval commune in around 1135, and this was confirmed when his son, Robert I, Count of Dreux, in a charter in 1180, it was not until the early 16th century that a town hall was erected on Place Métézeau. The building was struck by lightning a few years later and had to be demolished. The foundation stone for a new building, which was erected on the same site, was laid by the local seigneur, Pierre de Haute-Ville, in 1512. It was designed by three successive architects, Pierre Chéron, Jean des Moulins, Clément Métezeau, in the Louis XII style, built in ashlar stone and was completed in 1537.

The design involved a broadly symmetrical main frontage of just two bays facing onto the square. On the ground floor, there was a mullioned and transomed window in the left-hand bay and an arched doorway in the right-hand bay. The first and second floors were fenestrated by mullioned and transomed windows and there were bartizans spanning the first and second floors. There was a steep roof with dormer windows surmounted by an octagonal bell tower and a weather vane. After the building ceased to be used for municipal purposes in 1897, it was used as a venue for exhibitions and public events.

In the late 19th century, the town council decided to move to larger premises. The site they selected was a new savings bank on the corner of Rue Marquis and Place Métézeau. The foundation stone for the new building had been laid by the mayor, Louis Terrier, on 23 April 1893. It was designed by Sieur Vidière in the Second Empire style, built in ashlar stone and was completed in 1894. The design involved a narrow but prominent main frontage on the corner of the two streets. There was a round headed doorway with voussoirs and an elaborate keystone on the ground floor. On the first floor, there was a round headed French doorway and a balcony, flanked by Ionic order columns supporting an entablature and an open pediment containing a clock. Behind the clock, there was a huge dome. The side elevations were designed in an equally elaborate style. The savings bank occupied the ground floor, and the town council occupied the first floor.

Following the liberation of the town by American troops on 16 August 1944, during the Second World War, the mayor, Maurice Viollette, who had been ousted and placed under house arrest by the Vichy government, gave a speech from the balcony of the town hall.

After the war, the council decided to acquire a suitable building for use as a dedicated town hall. The building they selected was Hôtel d'Arjuzon on Rue de Châteaudun. The building had been commissioned by Georges d'Arjuzon, who was chamberlain to Napoleon III. The building was designed in the neoclassical style, built in brick with a cement render finish and was completed in 1886.

The design involved a symmetrical main frontage of seven bays facing across a large garden towards Rue Loiseleur-Deslongchamps. The central section of three bays was slightly projected forward and the central bay was projected even further forward. The central bay featured a round headed doorway with a glass canopy on the ground floor, a casement window with iron railings and red brick detailing on the first floor and a dormer window at attic level. The other bays were fenestrated in a similar style, including the end bays which were only two-storey. The town council acquired the building from Baroness Coche de la Ferté in 1952.
