= Issa Samba =

Football (born 1998)

Personal information
- Date of birth: 29 January 1998 (age 28)
- Place of birth: Dreux, France
- Height: 1.82 m (6 ft 0 in)
- Position: Defender

Team information
- Current team: Sloboda Novi Grad

Youth career
- 2004–2010: Port SPL Dreux
- 2010–2012: Centre Formation F.Paris
- 2012–2016: Auxerre

Senior career*
Years	Team	Apps	(Gls)
2016–2019	Auxerre II	24	(0)
2016–2019	Auxerre	2	(0)
2019–2020	Gozzano	2	(0)
2021–	Sloboda Novi Grad	0	(0)

International career^{‡}
2015	France U17	7	(1)
2015–2016	France U18	7	(0)
2019–	Mauritania	1	(0)
- * Club domestic league appearances and goals as of 29 December 2020 ‡ National team caps and goals as of 08:46, 19 June 2019 (UTC)

Issa Samba (born 29 January 1998) is a professional footballer who plays as a right-back for First League of the RS club Sloboda Novi Grad . He was born in France and represented it on junior levels, before switching to Mauritania as a senior.

== Club career ==
Samba made his professional debut for AJ Auxerre in a 2–1 loss to Tours FC on 25 November 2016.

On 4 December 2019, he joined Italian Serie C club Gozzano.

== International career ==
Samba was born in France to parents of Mauritanian descent. He is a youth international for France U17 and 18. He made his debut for the Mauritania national team on 26 March 2019 in a friendly against Ghana.

== Honours ==
France U17

- UEFA European Under-17 Championship: 2015
