= Geovane (footballer, born 1998) =

Brazilian footballer

Personal information
- Full name: Geovane Nascimento Silva
- Date of birth: 15 June 1998 (age 28)
- Place of birth: Jacobina, Brazil
- Height: 1.72 m (5 ft 8 in)
- Position: Midfielder

Team information
- Current team: Inter de Limeira

Youth career
- –2015: Vitória
- 2016–2019: São Paulo

Senior career*
| Years | Team | Apps | (Gls) |
| 2017–2019 | São Paulo | 0 | (0) |
| 2019 | → Louletano (loan) | 17 | (5) |
| 2019 | → América Mineiro (loan) | 17 | (1) |
| 2020–2021 | América Mineiro | 38 | (3) |
| 2022– | Inter de Limeira | 3 | (0) |

International career
| 2015 | Brazil U17 | 4 | (0) |
- * Club domestic league appearances and goals as of 02:07, 6 February 2022 (UTC)

Geovane Nascimento Silva (born 15 June 1998), simply known as Geovane, is a Brazilian footballer who plays as a midfielder for Associação Desportiva Confiança.

== Career statistics ==
As of 5 February 2022.

| Club | Season | League | | | State League | | Cup | | Continental | | Other | | Total | |
| Club | Season | Division | Apps | Goals | Apps | Goals | Apps | Goals | Apps | Goals | Apps | Goals | Apps | Goals |
|---|---|---|---|---|---|---|---|---|---|---|---|---|---|---|
| São Paulo | 2017 | Série A | 0 | 0 | 0 | 0 | 0 | 0 | — | | 6 (Note: Appearance(s) in Copa Paulista) | 0 | 6 | 0 |
| Louletano | 2018–19 | Campeonato de Portugal | 17 | 5 | — | | 0 | 0 | — | | 0 | 0 | 17 | 5 |
| América Mineiro | 2019 | Série B | 17 | 1 | — | | 0 | 0 | — | | — | | 17 | 1 |
| América Mineiro | 2020 | Série B | 21 | 1 | 6 (Note: Appearance(s) in Campeonato Mineiro) | 1 | 8 | 0 | — | | — | | 35 | 2 |
| América Mineiro | 2021 | Série A | 10 | 1 | 1 | 0 | 1 | 0 | — | | — | | 12 | 1 |
| América Mineiro | Total | | 48 | 3 | 7 | 1 | 9 | 0 | — | | — | | 64 | 4 |
| Inter de Limeira | 2022 | Série D | 0 | 0 | 3 | 0 | 0 | 0 | — | | — | | 3 | 0 |
| Career total | | | 65 | 8 | 10 | 1 | 9 | 0 | 0 | 0 | 6 | 0 | 90 | 9 |
