= León Fidel Ojeda =

Colombian politician

León Fidel Ojeda (born October 20, 1967) is a Colombian politician, and mayor of the city of Montería.

== Biography ==
Fidel Ojeda was born in Chinú, a small town in Colombia's northern Córdoba Department. He graduated from the University of Sinú in 1989, with a law degree. He continued to study civil processes and rights after his graduation, specializing in civil management.

Fidel Ojeda's first political position was as director of the Department of Transit and Traffic for the department of Córdoba. The next office he held was Secretary of Transit and Transport for the city of Montería. His experience derived from these positions later allowed him to be elected mayor of Montería. As mayor, he has drawn from his previous governmental positions, making the improvement of the city's infrastructure the central element of his mayoral activities. He has also helped to improve the city's cultural and sports scenes, which he has deemed important for a city moving into the 21st century. In addition, Fidel Ojeda has worked to improve the city's education and health systems.
