= Marcelo Arce =

Argentine footballer

Personal information
- Full name: Horacio Marcelo Arce Villarino
- Date of birth: October 20, 1970 (age 56)
- Place of birth: Pehuajó, Buenos Aires, Argentina
- Position: Forward

Youth career
- San Martín Pehuajó
- 1986–1990: Comunicaciones

Senior career*
Years	Team	Apps	(Gls)
1990–1991	Comunicaciones	–	(–)
1992	Argentinos Juniors	3	(0)
1993	SV Oberwart	8	(2)
1993	Deportes Antofagasta	0	(0)
1994–1995	Godoy Cruz	4	(0)
1996	Atlético Bucaramanga	28	(12)
1996–1998	Olimpo	56	(20)
1998–1999	San Martín SJ	23	(4)
1999–2000	Olimpo	28	(10)
2000	Querétaro	33	(18)
Total		183	(66)
Medal record
First place	Categoría Primera A	1996
- * Club domestic league appearances and goals

Horacio Marcelo Arce Villarino (born October 20, 1970), known as Marcelo Arce, is an Argentine former footballer who played for clubs from Argentina, Chile, Mexico, Colombia and Austria. He played as a striker.

== Career ==
Born in Pehuajó, Buenos Aires, Argentina, Arce was with Club Atlético General San Martín de Pehuajó before joining Comunicaciones in the Argentine Primera C, aged 15. In 1992, he switched to Argentinos Juniors.

Abroad, he played for SV Oberwart in the Austrian second level, Deportes Antofagasta in Chile, Atlético Bucaramanga in Colombia and Querétaro in Mexico.

Following his retirement, Arce made his home in Mexico and has developed a career as football coach.
