= Ricardo Rodríguez (footballer, born 1998) =

Argentine footballer (born 1998)

Personal information
- Full name: Ricardo José Rodríguez Marengo
- Date of birth: 10 May 1998 (age 28)
- Place of birth: Buenos Aires, Argentina
- Height: 1.77 m (5 ft 9 1/2 in)
- Position: Striker

Youth career
- 2009–2015: Universidad Católica

Senior career*
Years	Team	Apps	(Gls)
2015–2018	Universidad Católica	1	(0)

International career
2015	Argentina U17	2	(0)
- * Club domestic league appearances and goals

Ricardo José Rodríguez Marengo (born 10 May 1998) is an Argentine former footballer who played as a striker.

== Early life ==
Ricardo was born in Buenos Aires, Argentina, and moved at the age of 9 to Santiago, Chile, after his father was transferred. He would join the inferior of Universidad Católica at the age of 12, after his soccer trainer of school recommended him so.

Ricardo made his professional debut on 17 December 2015 coming on as a substitute in a 2–1 defeat against Palestino.
