= Juan Manuel Rodríguez Ojeda =

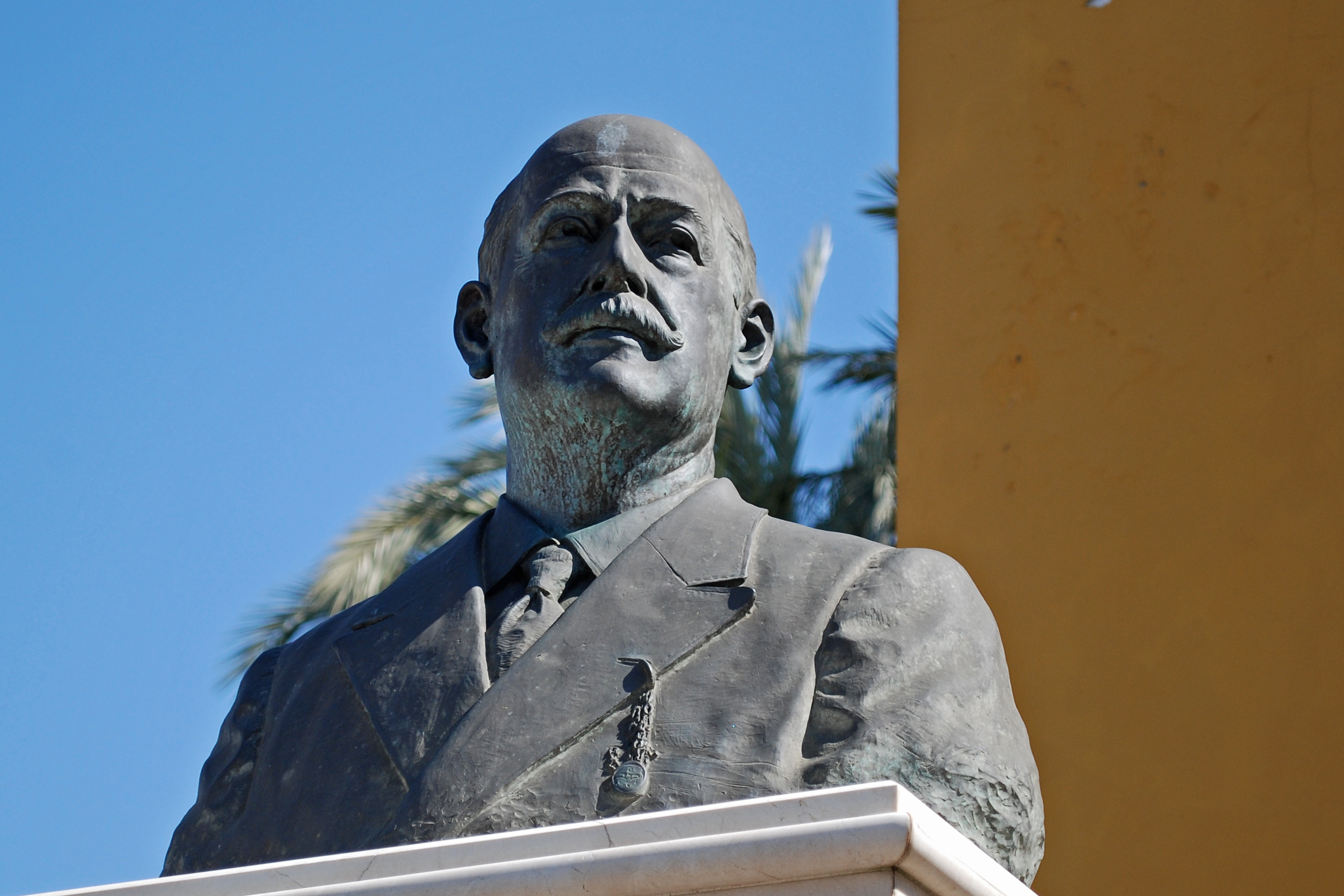
bust of Juan Manuel Rodríguez Ojeda

Juan Manuel Rodríguez Ojeda (1853–1930) was a Spanish embroiderer and designer who contributed his works and innovations to the aesthetic change that occurred in the brotherhoods of Seville's Holy Week in the early years of the twentieth century.

== Biography ==
He began in the art of embroidery in the famous workshop of the Antunz sisters. His work can be divided into two stages, the first of traditional cut that spans from 1879 to 1900.

In 1901 he designed the pallium for the passage of the Virgen de la Amargura of Sevilla which was a major metamorphose in style until then prevailing. It was embroidered in gold thread on blue velvet, instead of the traditional black that was used on the palliums as a sign of mourning. The new shapes of the ensemble also added a series of curved lines in the falls of the skirts that caused a new visual sensation and broke with the predominance of straight lines.

Many of his works were in the design of the Brotherhood of La Esperanza Macarena (Seville) of which he was brother, in addition to holding several internal positions as a mesh mantle that premiered in 1900 and is popularly known as «El Camaronero», or the pallium that premiered in Easter 1908, embroidered on red velvet and mesh, which contributed its novel shapes and embroidery to the popularization of the new artisirc look, creating a new style of dressing the painful ones that was very imitated later. In addition to his embroidery side, he was also a designer of goldsmith works, as well as the clothes of the Roman Century of the Macarena that accompanies the image of Nuestro Padre Jesús de la Sentencia in his annual procession in the early morning of Good Friday

In 1915, he made one of his most accomplished works, formed by the whole pallium and the mantle of the Virgin of the Presentation of the Brotherhood of El Calvario (Seville), this work is framed in the current historicalist as can be seen among other details.

== Bibliography ==
- Andrés Luque Teruel: Juan Manuel Rodríguez Ojeda, diseños y bordados para la Hermandad de la Macarena 1879–1900, Sevilla, 2009, ISBN 978-84-96790-46-9.
