= Park Myeong-su (footballer) =

South Korean footballer

Personal information
- Full name: Park Myeong-su
- Date of birth: 11 January 1998 (age 28)
- Place of birth: South Korea
- Height: 1.74 m (5 ft 9 in)
- Position: Defender

Team information
- Current team: Daejeon Citizen
- Number: 34

Youth career
- 2013–2015: Daegun High School
- 2016: Soongsil University

Senior career*
Years	Team	Apps	(Gls)
2017	Incheon United	0	(0)
2017	→ Gyeongnam FC (loan)	11	(0)
2018–	Daejeon Citizen	4	(0)

International career^{‡}
2013–2015	South Korea U-17	26	(1)
2016	South Korea U-20	1	(0)
- * Club domestic league appearances and goals as of 2 January 2019 ‡ National team caps and goals as of 2 January 2017

- Park Myeong-su
- Hangul: 박명수
- RR: Bak Myeongsu
- MR: Pak Myŏngsu

Park Myeong-su (born 11 January 1998) is a South Korean football defender who plays for Daejeon Citizen in K League 2.
