= Louis Victor Dubois =

French politician

Personal details
- Born: 4 December 1837 Dreux, Eure-et-Loir, France
- Died: 12 November 1914 (aged 76) Dreux, Eure-et-Loir, France
- Occupation: Wine merchant

Louis Victor Dubois (4 December 1837 – 12 November 1914) was a French politician.

== Life ==
Louis Victor Dubois was born on 4 December 1837 in Dreux, Eure-et-Loir, son of wine merchant. On 1 January 1861 he succeeded his father in the business, which he practiced until 1 July 1891. In 1868 he was appointed a deputy judge in the Commercial Court. He was elected to the municipal council in 1870. He was made a judge at the Commercial Court in 1872. In 1877 he became a councilor of the arrondissement of Dreux, and on 31 January 1878 he became mayor of Dreux. He held this office for ten years. He was elected Councillor General of Eure-et-Loir on 6 October 1895.

Dubois ran successfully for election as deputy for Dreux on 3 November 1895 after the death of the incumbent, Jean Terrier, former Minister of Commerce and Industry. He joined the Progressive group. He was reelected in the general elections of 8 May 1898. He was defeated in the general elections of April–May 1902, and did not run for election again. Louis Dubois died on 12 November 1914 in Dreux.

== Sources ==
- Jolly, Jean (1977). "Louis, Victor DUBOIS". Dictionnaire des parlementaires français de 1889 à 1940 (in French).
