= Enrique Ojeda (scholar) =

- Born: 1928; Quito, Ecuador
- Died: June 2023 (aged 94–95); Ponte Vedra Beach, Florida, U.S.
- Education: Pontifical Catholic University of Ecuador (BA, MA); University of Cincinnati (MA); Harvard University (PhD)
- Occupations: Writer, academic
- Writing career
- Notable works: Cuatro obras de Jorge Icaza Coronel; Jorge Carrera Andrade Introducción al estudio de su vida y de su obra
- Literary movement: Indigenismo; Latin American literature

José Enrique Ojeda (1928 – June 2023) was an Ecuadorian-born writer and academic. A professor at Boston College for 30 years, he was the author of several books about Latin American literature, and was called "the world's leading authority" on Ecuadoran poet Jorge Carrera Andrade. Ojeda also wrote extensively on Ecuadoran novelist Jorge Icaza.

Ojeda grew up in Quito, Ecuador, where his father had a dental practice. He attended prep school at Quito's Colegio Loyola, a Jesuit institution, then earned a BA and an MA at the Pontifical Catholic University of Ecuador. Moving to the U.S., Ojeda earned an MA in French Literature at the University of Cincinnati in 1959. In 1966, Ojeda earned a Ph.D. in Romance Languages and Literatures from Harvard University.

Ojeda lived with his wife, Jo Ellen Haynes Ojeda, in Barrington, Rhode Island and Ponte Vedra Beach, Florida. He died at his winter home in Ponte Vedra Beach in June 2023.

photo of Enrique Ojeda

== Books ==
- Cuatro obras de Jorge Icaza, Quito, Casa de la Cultura Ecuatoriana, 1960.
- Jorge Carrera Andrade. Introducción al estudio de su vida y de su obra, cover, Madrid-New York, Torres Library of Literary Studies, 1972
- La ciudad sobre la colina, cover, Quito, Banco Central del Ecuador, 1990
- Ensayos sobre Jorge Icaza, cover, Quito, Casa de la Cultura Ecuatoriana, 1991
- En pos del minero de la noche, cover, Quito, Paradiso Editores, 2010

Ojeda edited, and wrote introductions for, the following books by Jorge Carrera Andrade:

- Poesía última, New York, Las Americas Publishing Company, 1968
- Reflexiones sobre la poesía hispanoamericana, Quito, Casa de la Cultura Ecuatoriana, 1987
- El volcán y el colibri. Autobiografía, Quito, Corporación Editora Nacional, 1989
- Relatos de un gozoso tragaleguas, Quito, Banco Central del Ecuador, 1994
- Poesías desconocidas de Jorge Carrera Andrade, cover, Quito, Paradiso Editores, 2002
- Microgramas, Quito, Orogenia, 2007

Ojeda wrote a chapter called "Jorge Carrera Andrade" for Latin American Writers, Supplement I, New York, Charles Scribner's Sons, 2002

Ojeda wrote many journal articles, including, "Littérature de l' Équateur", "Les années Fastes: de 1920 a 1960", Nuit Blanche, Québec, Février 2004

Jorge Icaza Coronel (left) and Ojeda (right)
