= Juan Ojeda (Paraguayan footballer) =

Paraguayan footballer (born 1998)

Personal information
- Full name: Juan Miguel Ojeda Gauto
- Date of birth: 4 April 1998 (age 28)
- Place of birth: Asunción, Paraguay
- Height: 1.88 m (6 ft 2 in)
- Position: Centre back

Team information
- Current team: Resistencia
- Number: 31

Youth career
- Sportivo Luqueño

Senior career*
Years	Team	Apps	(Gls)
2019–2020	Sportivo Luqueño	25	(2)
2021–2022	12 de Octubre	18	(1)
2022	→ Cuiabá (loan)	0	(0)
2023–	Resistencia	8	(0)

International career^{‡}
2015	Paraguay U17	4	(0)
- * Club domestic league appearances and goals as of 28 April 2023 ‡ National team caps and goals as of 25 October 2015

Juan Miguel Ojeda Gauto (born 4 April 1998) is a Paraguayan footballer who plays as central defender for Resistencia.

== Club career ==
Born in Asunción, Ojeda was a Sportivo Luqueño youth graduate. He made his first team – and Primera División – debut on 31 March 2019, coming on as a second-half substitute in a 3–1 home win over River Plate Asunción.

Ojeda scored his first senior goal on 11 August 2019, netting his team's only in a 1–3 loss at Olimpia. On 19 January 2021, he moved to fellow top tier side 12 de Octubre.

On 30 December 2021, Ojeda was announced at Campeonato Brasileiro Série A club Cuiabá, after signing a one-year loan deal with the club.

== Personal life ==
Ojeda's father, also named Juan, was also a footballer.

== Career statistics ==
As of 17 January 2022

Club	Season	League			Cup		Continental		Other		Total	
Club	Season	Division	Apps	Goals	Apps	Goals	Apps	Goals	Apps	Goals	Apps	Goals
Sportivo Luqueño	2018	Primera División	14	1	—		—		—		14	1
Sportivo Luqueño	2019	Primera División	11	1	—		2 (Note: Appearance(s) in Copa Sudamericana)	0	—		13	1
Sportivo Luqueño	Total		25	2	—		2	0	—		27	2
12 de Octubre	2021	Primera División	18	1	—		3	0	—		21	1
Cuiabá (loan)	2022	Série A	0	0	0	0	0	0	—		0	0
Career total			43	3	0	0	5	0	0	0	48	3
